= Japanese occupation of Attu =

World War II occupation

- Part of the American Theater and the Pacific Theater of World War II
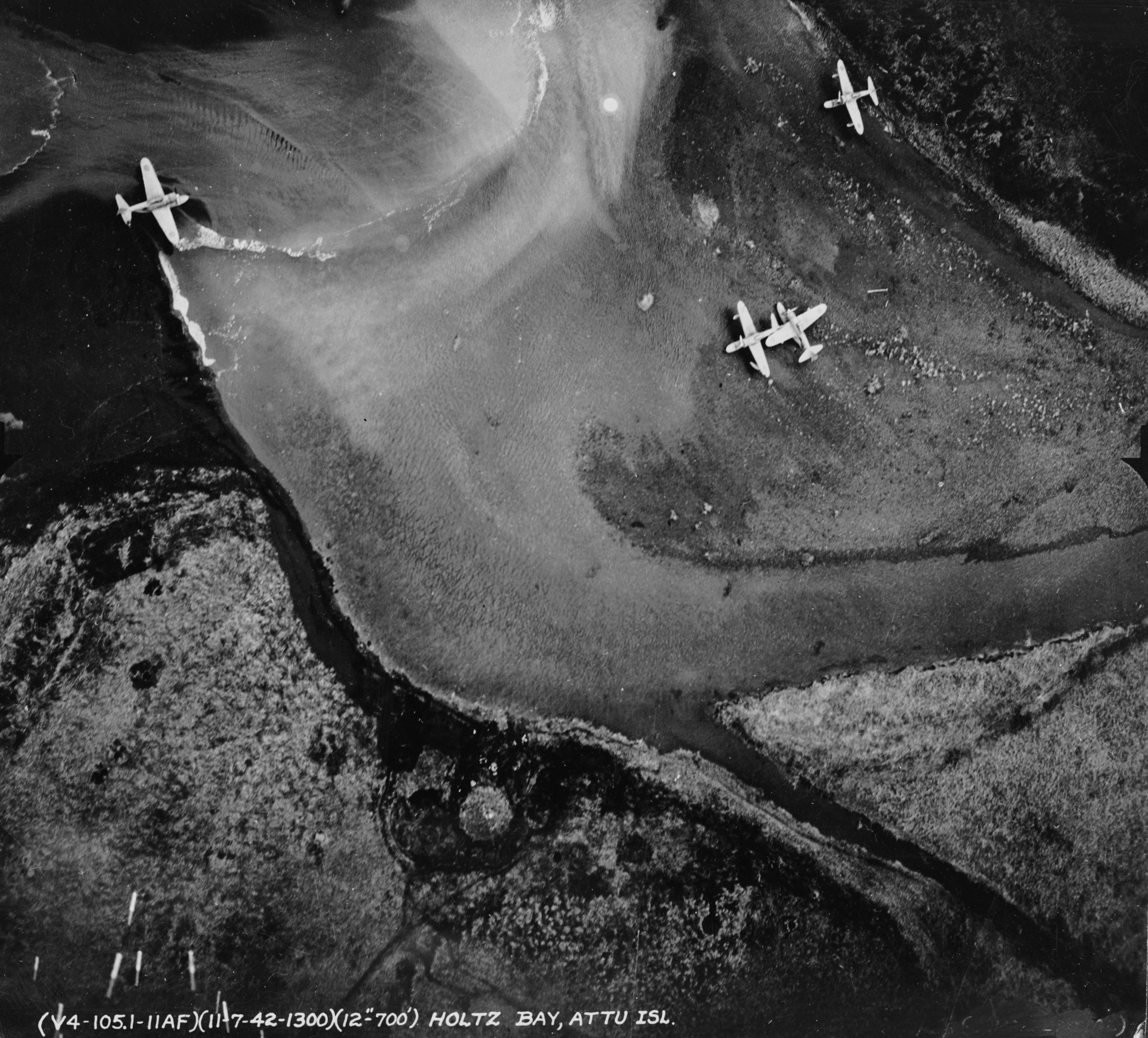
- Four Japanese seaplanes landed at Holtz Bay, Attu Island on 7 November 1942. Photo taken by American surveillance aircraft.
Date	7 June 1942 – 30 May 1943
Location	Attu, Aleutian Islands, Alaska, United States 52.9241°N 173.1568°E
Result	Japanese victory
Territorial changes	Japanese occupation commences

Belligerents
United States	(Empire of Japan) Japan

Commanders and leaders
N/A	(Empire of Japan) Matsutoshi Hosumi (Empire of Japan) Yasuyo Yamasaki † (Empire of Japan) Boshirō Hosogaya

Strength
N/A	1,140 – 2,900

Casualties and losses
1 civilian killed 43 civilians captured	Unknown

The Japanese occupation of Attu (Operation AL) was the result of an invasion of the Aleutian Islands in Alaska during World War II. Imperial Japanese Army troops landed on 7 June 1942, the day after the invasion of nearby Kiska. Along with the Kiska landing, it was the first time that the continental United States was invaded and occupied by a foreign power since the War of 1812. The occupation ended with the Allied victory in the Battle of Attu on 30 May 1943.

== Background ==
=== Operation AL ===
Although it is not clear how the Navy General Staff requested the Combined Fleet Command to plan the Aleutian Operation (Operation AL) to occupy Attu and Kiska Islands, the Navy General Staff seemed to have acknowledged the necessity of Operation AL in response to the proposition of the Fifth Fleet when considering the attempt to overtake Midway (Operation MI).

The plan of Operation AL was consulted with the Imperial General Headquarters army section on 15 April. In early June, the navy would attack Dutch Harbor and Adak Island, and occupy Kiska Island and Attu Island. The Imperial Japanese Army was reluctant to occupy the Aleutian Islands and responded to the navy on 16 April that they would not dispatch troops to the operation. However, the Doolittle Raid on Japan from the North Pacific on 18 April had a great influence on Operation AL. After the air raids on Japan by the Doolittle bombers, the army acknowledged the need to set up patrol bases on the western Aleutian Islands and agreed on 21 April to dispatch troops.

The Navy General Staff promoted Operation MI and Operation AL with the primary purpose of advancing the bases for patrol line, and the Combined Fleet Command also followed it. In other words, the purpose of Operation AL was to build a patrol network in the North Pacific by establishing bases on Midway, Attu, and Kiska to monitor attacks on Japan mainland by US task forces. At the same time, it was intended to prevent advances of US air bases.

Eventually, it was determined that the Imperial Army would invade Attu Island and the Imperial Navy (Navy Maizuru Third Special Naval Landing Force) would invade Kiska Island. The army established the North Sea Detachment (Hokkai-shitai) on 5 May, headed by Major Matsutoshi Hozumi and consisting of approximately 1,000 men.

The order of operation was announced on 5 May. Hozumi was tasked to secure or destroy key points in the western part of the Aleutian Islands, and to make enemy mobility and air power advance in this area difficult. The finalized plan was to destroy Adak's military facilities and then withdraw. Next, the army troops were to invade Attu while the navy invaded Kiska.

Prior to the landings, air raids from carriers were to destroy the air force at Dutch Harbor.

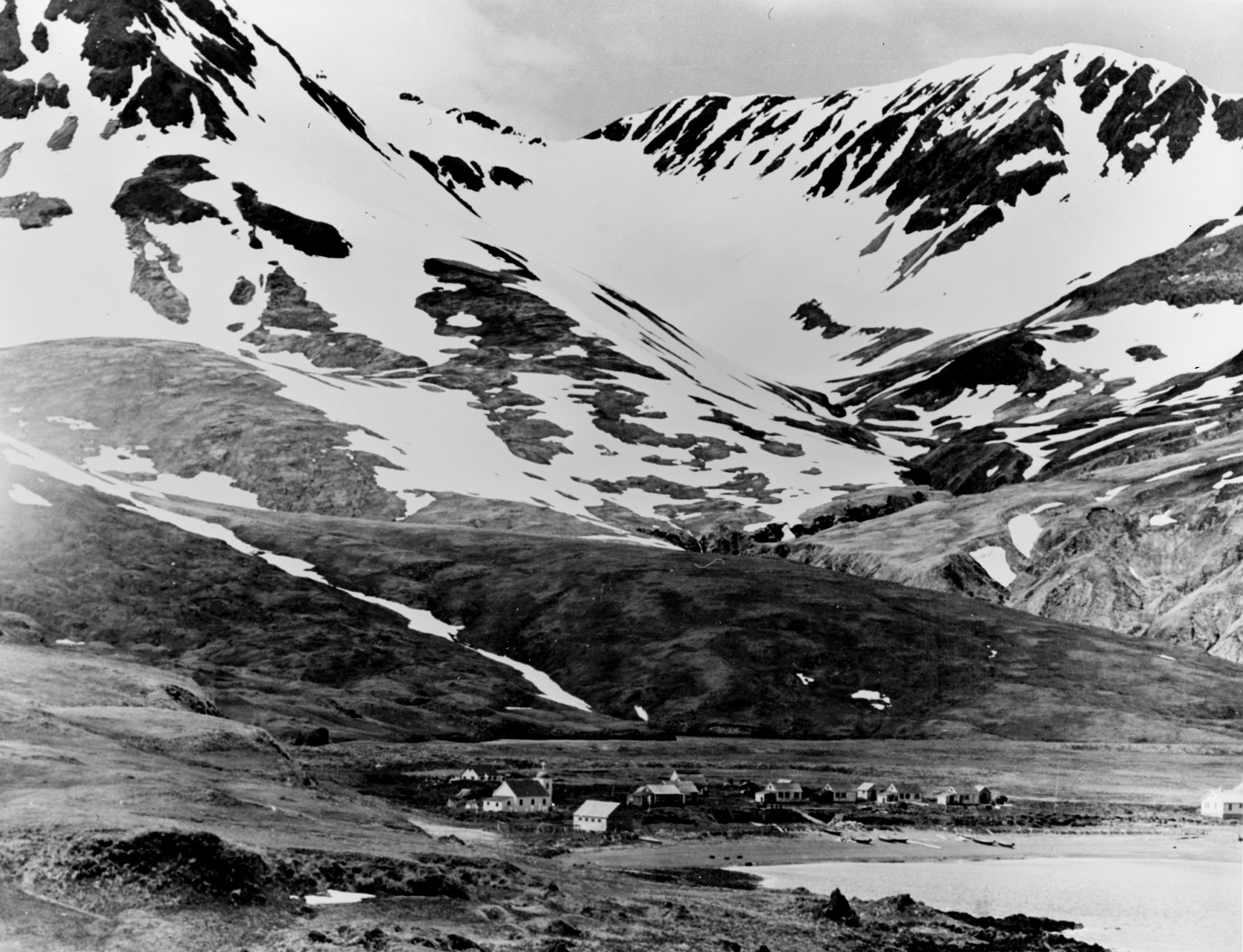
Attu village prior to occupation

== Occupation ==
In May 1942, the Japanese began near-simultaneous campaigns against Midway and the Aleutians, thus beginning the Aleutian Islands campaign. During the Battle of Midway, Japanese forces were repulsed in a decisive action. Meanwhile on 7 June, Japanese naval forces under Boshirō Hosogaya landed troops unopposed at Attu in conjunction with the same forces invading Kiska the previous day. A force consisting of 1,140 infantry under Major Matsutoshi Hosumi took control of the island and captured Attu's population, which consisted of 42 Aleuts and two white Americans, Charles Foster Jones (1879–1942), an amateur radio operator and weather reporter, originally from St. Paris, Ohio, and his wife Etta (1879–1965), a teacher and nurse, originally from Vineland, New Jersey. The village consisted of several houses around Chichagof Harbor on the northeast side of the island. After landing, the Japanese soldiers began constructing an airbase and fortifications. The nearest American forces were on Unalaska Island at Dutch Harbor and at an airbase on Adak Island. Throughout the occupation, American air and naval forces bombarded the island. Initially the Japanese intended to hold the Aleutians only until the winter of 1942; however, the occupation continued into 1943 in order to deny the Americans use of the islands. In August 1942, the garrison at Attu was moved to Kiska to help repel a suspected American attack. From August to October 1942, Attu was unoccupied until a 2,900-man force under Colonel Yasuyo Yamasaki arrived. The new garrison continued constructing the airfield and fortifications.

=== Internment of islanders ===
The 41 Aleut inhabitants who survived the June 1942 invasion were forcefully taken to a prison camp near Otaru, Hokkaido. Sixteen of them died while they were imprisoned, with one dying on the Japanese ship before it arrived in Otaru. The Otaru deaths were caused by the spread of tuberculosis among the imprisoned Aleuts, and starvation/malnutrition, since the Japanese primarily fed them small portions of rice. Aleut chief Mike Hodikoff and his son George died after eating poisoned food from a garbage bin, since they were starving in the prison. The Japanese also forced the imprisoned Aleut children to learn Japanese, threatening to kill them if they didn't. Alex Prossoff, a survivor of the prison camp, later said in 1988, "as long as Americans are fight for my country I'll be on their side. I told them Japs destroy our homes, make us prisoners and put us on a land where we cannot talk his language. So I cannot say Japs are good people."

Charles Jones was killed by the Japanese forces immediately after the invasion because he refused to fix the radio he destroyed to prevent the occupying troops from using it. His wife was subsequently taken to the Bund Hotel in Yokohama, Japan. On July 22, 1942, American publication Yank, the Army Weekly labelled Jones as the first prisoner of war from the Western Hemisphere, although this is incorrect, since Attu is at the far western end of the Aleutian chain, and is one of the islands technically situated in the Eastern Hemisphere. While at the Bund hotel, Jones read of her capture in a Japanese newspaper which was published in English. This hotel also housed Australian nurses from Rabaul in Papua New Guinea (which was then part of Australia), with these nurses having been taken prisoner during the capture of Rabaul in early 1942. Jones arrived at the Bund Hotel three weeks before the Australian nurses from Rabaul, and Jones formed a friendship with them. While at the hotel, the women were addressed by a representative of the Japanese Foreign Office about being exchanged in return for Japanese prisoners in Australia and the United States. However, Australians were still treated as British subjects at this point, and there were no Japanese prisoners in Britain to exchange for the Australians, so the British government had to find prisoners from elsewhere to exchange. The Japanese intentionally treated the women well at the hotel, since it would be standard procedure for the returning internees to make statements about their treatment and conditions. The women were later transferred to the Yokohama Yacht Club and kept there until July 1944 when they were moved to the old Totsuka Hospital in Yokohama. The hospital served as an internment camp until the end of the war in August 1945. Etta Jones died in December 1965 at age 86 in Bradenton, Florida.

== Battle of Attu ==
On 11 May 1943, units from 17th Infantry, of Major General Albert E. Brown's 7th U.S. Infantry Division made amphibious landings on Attu to retake the island. On 12 May, I-31 was forced to surface five miles northeast of Chichagof Harbor, she was then sunk in a surface engagement with USS Edwards.

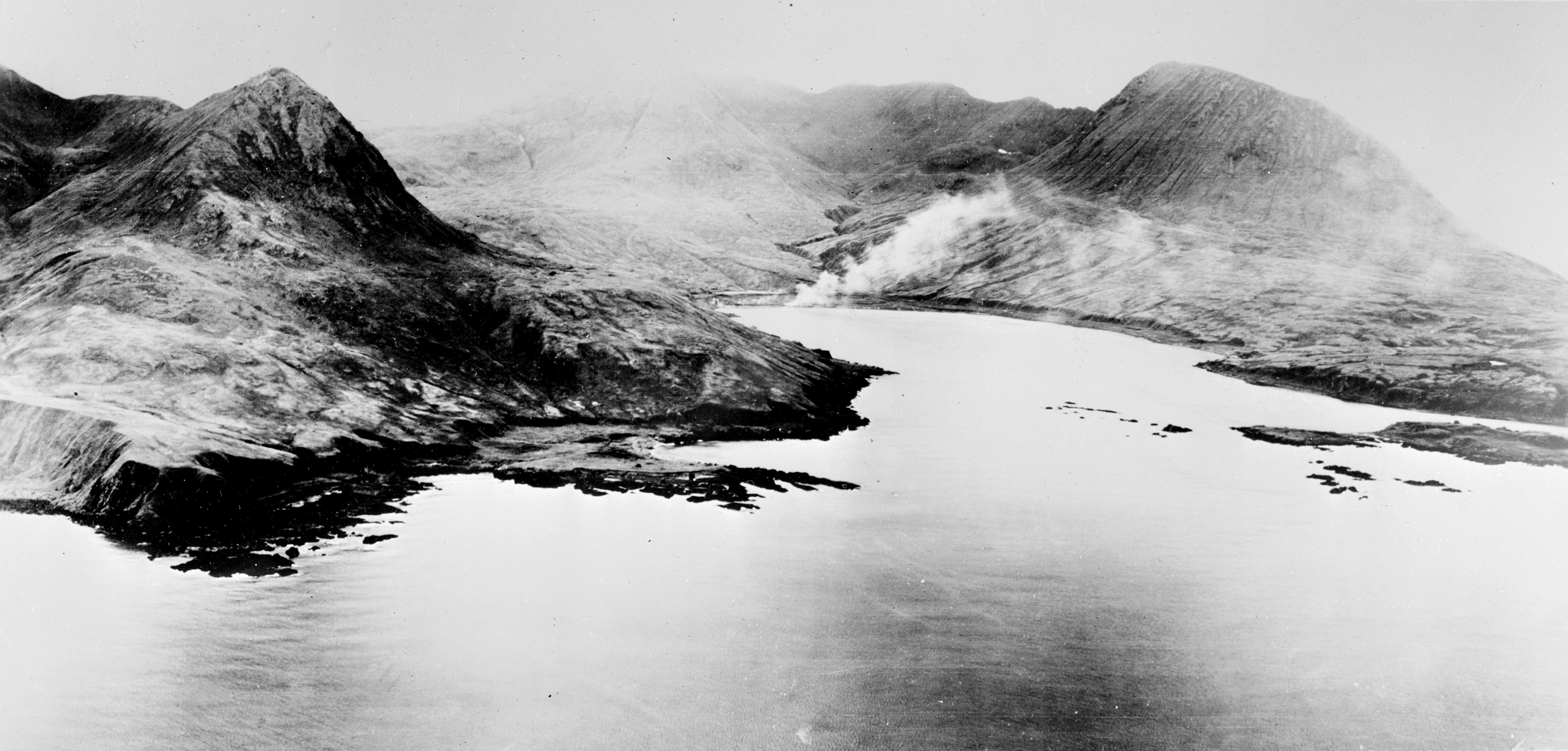
Chichagof Harbor under attack during the Allied liberation of Attu.

Allied forces under General John L. DeWitt took control of the island on 30 May after the remaining Japanese troops conducted a massive banzai charge. American forces lost 549 killed and 1,148 wounded, with another 2,100 evacuated because of weather-related injuries. During the battle all but 29 men of the Japanese garrison were killed.

== Aftermath ==
The occupation ended with an American victory and American forces deemed the half-completed airfield as not ideally situated. After building a new airfield, the Americans launched bomber attacks against the Japanese home islands for the remainder of the war.

Attu village was abandoned after the war, and surviving members of Japanese internment were moved to other islands after the war. Attu and Kiska are no longer safe for habitation, as the Japanese left an extensive amount of booby traps and land mines on the islands, which could still explode. Unlike on Attu, a large number of the booby traps and land mines on Kiska were deliberately placed by the Japanese just before they secretly evacuated the island, rather than being placed there before or during the conflict. In 2012, for the 70th anniversary of the occupation, a memorial to Attu village was dedicated at the former site of the town. In June 2017, the United States government issued a formal apology to the Aleut people, as many from other islands died after being evacuated to squalid Southeast Alaskan camps, following Japan's attacks on the Aleutian Islands. Beginning in 1988, the United States government also gave financial reparations to families. The Japanese government have currently never issued a formal apology for the Aleuts who were taken to the prison camp in Hokkaido.

== See also ==
- Attacks on North America during World War II
- Attacks on the United States
