= Paul Nobuo Tatsuguchi =

Surgeon in the Imperial Japanese Army

- 辰口 信夫
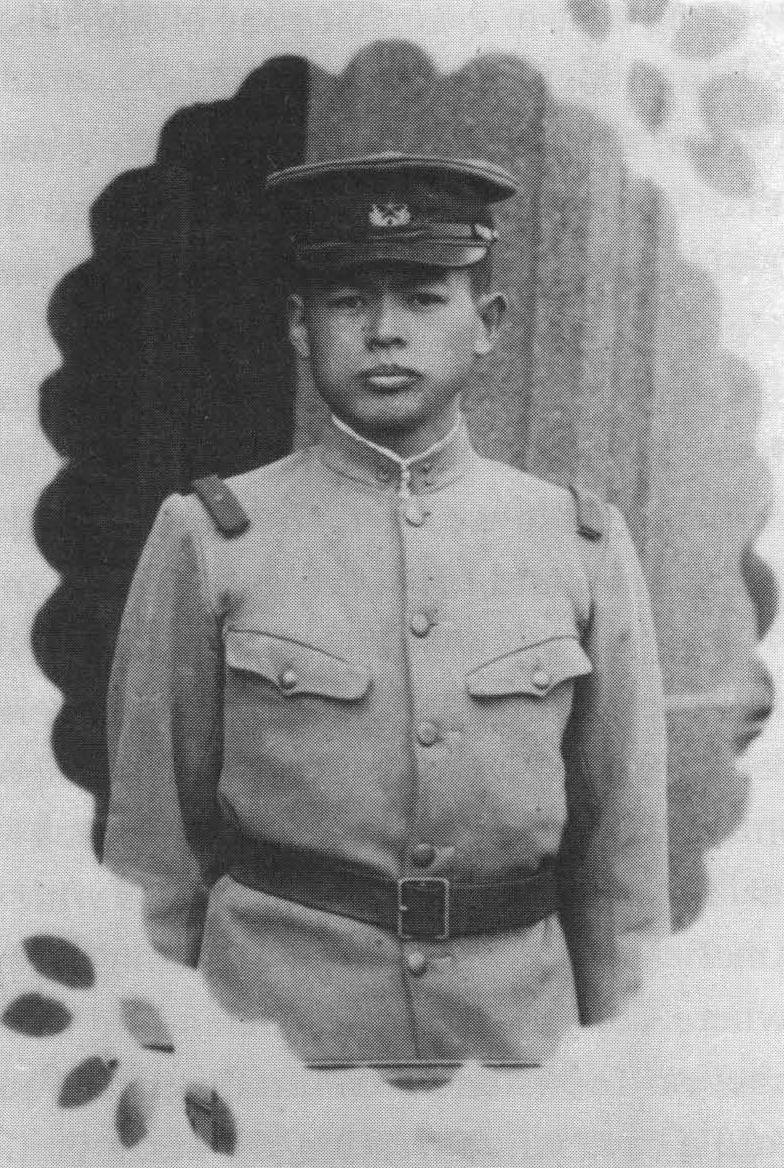
- Tatsuguchi in 1941
- Born: August 31, 1911; Hiroshima, Japan
- Died: May 30, 1943 (aged 31); Attu Island, Alaska, United States
- Military career
- Allegiance: Empire of Japan
- Branch: Imperial Japanese Army
- Service years: 1941–1943
- Rank: Sergeant major
- Conflicts: World War II; Pacific War; Aleutian Islands campaign; Battle of Attu †

Paul Nobuo Tatsuguchi (辰口 信夫, Tatsuguchi Nobuo; August 31, 1911 – May 30, 1943; sometimes mistakenly referred to as Nebu Tatsuguchi), was a Japanese soldier and surgeon who served in the Imperial Japanese Army (IJA) during World War II. He was killed during the Battle of Attu on Attu Island, Alaska, United States, on May 30, 1943.

A devout Seventh-day Adventist, Tatsuguchi studied medicine and was licensed as a physician in the United States (US). He returned to his native Japan to practice medicine at the Tokyo Adventist Sanitarium, where he received further medical training. In 1941, he was ordered to cease his medical practice and conscripted into the IJA as an acting medical officer, although he was given an enlisted rather than officer rank because of his American connections. In late 1942, Tatsuguchi was sent to Attu, which had been occupied by Japanese forces in June 1942. On May 11, 1943, The United States Army landed on the island, intending to retake American soil from the Japanese.

Throughout the ensuing battle, Tatsuguchi kept a diary in which he recorded its events and his struggle to care for the wounded in his field hospital. He was killed on the battle's final day after the remaining Japanese conducted one last, suicidal charge against the American forces.

Tatsuguchi's diary was recovered by American forces and translated into English. Copies of the translation were widely disseminated and publicized in the U.S. after the battle. The American public was intrigued by a Christian, American-trained doctor serving with Japanese forces on the island and by his apparent participation in assisting with the deaths of wounded Japanese soldiers in his field hospital during the battle's final days. Translated excerpts from his diary have been widely quoted in Western historical accounts of the battle, especially his final entry in which he recorded a farewell message to his family.

== Early life ==
Tatsuguchi's father, Shuichi Tatsuguchi, was born and raised in Hiroshima, Japan, before leaving for the US in 1895 to "explore the new world". He attended Healdsburg College, later renamed Pacific Union College, in Angwin, California. While attending the college, he was baptized into the Seventh-day Adventist Church. In 1907, after completing a course of study in dentistry at the College of Physicians and Surgeons in San Francisco, Shuichi Tatsuguchi returned to Hiroshima with plans to serve as a medical missionary.

In Hiroshima, Tatsuguchi established a prosperous dental practice and promoted the establishment of the Hiroshima Adventist church. He married Sadako Shibata who was also familiar with the US and spoke fluent English. Shuichi and Sadako had three sons and three daughters. All three sons would eventually attend school in the US. The middle son, born on August 31, 1911, was given the Christian name of Paul and the Japanese name of Nobuo, although he was called "Joseph" at home.

== Schooling and marriage ==
Paul Nobuo Tatsuguchi graduated from middle school in Hiroshima on March 16, 1919. On March 2, 1923, he graduated from Travier English Academy. Paul traveled to California and entered Pacific Union College in 1926 and graduated in May 1932. When his parents both died unexpectedly in 1932, Paul returned to Japan to help settle the family affairs. He returned to California in 1933 and entered the College of Medical Evangelists at Loma Linda University, completing the course of study in June 1937. Paul Tatsuguchi then accepted a year's internship at White Memorial Hospital in Los Angeles. While studying in America, Tatsuguchi was regarded by his classmates, who called him "Tatsy" or Paul, as a serious student, friendly but not gregarious. Classmate J. Mudry, a year behind Tatsuguchi at Loma Linda University, later said, "I know him well. I always thought Tatsuguchi—we called him Paul—was quite an American."

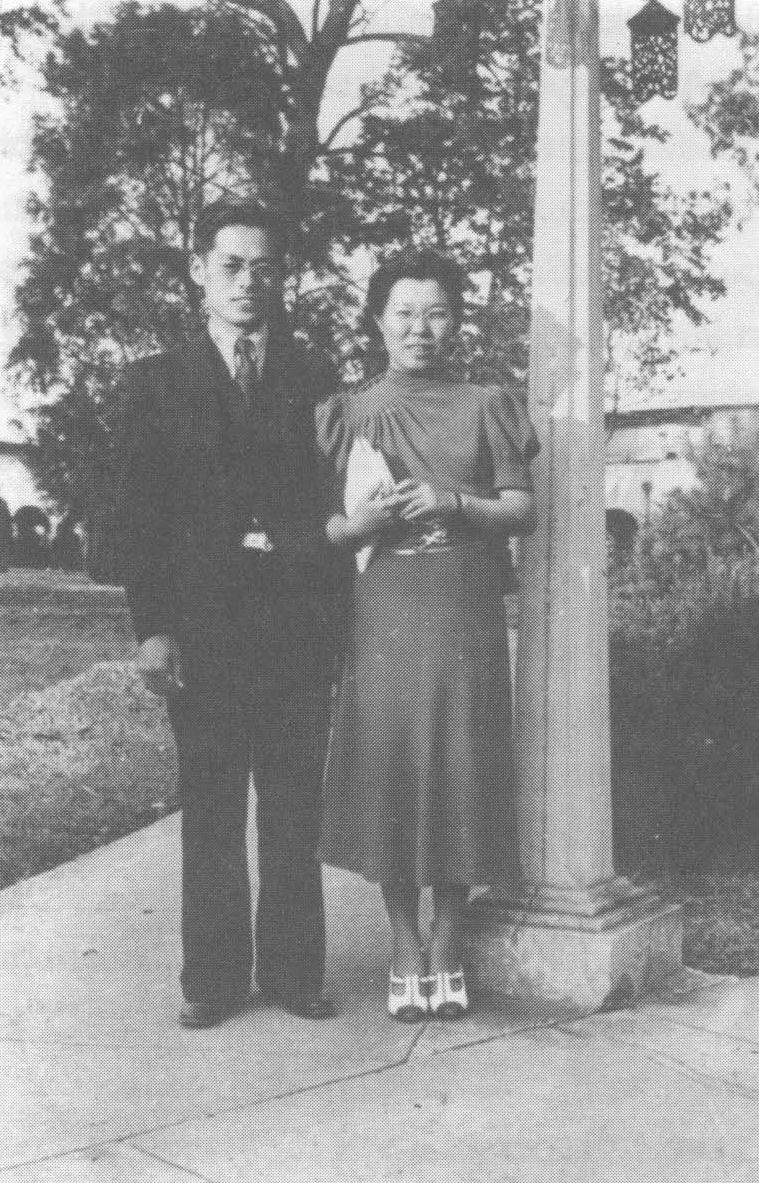
Paul and Taeko soon after their marriage in 1938

On September 8, 1938, Tatsuguchi graduated as a Doctor of Medicine and was awarded a California medical license. That same year, he accepted a position at the Tokyo Adventist Sanitarium, an institution founded in part by his father in 1928. As he would be working with tuberculosis patients in Tokyo, Tatsuguchi spent several more months undergoing postgraduate medical studies in California. Also in 1938, Tatsuguchi married a childhood friend, Taeko Miyake, who he proposed to during a trip to Yosemite National Park. Taeko's parents were serving as Adventist missionaries in Honolulu, Hawaii, while Taeko pursued studies at La Sierra Academy in Riverside, California. After a quick sightseeing trip by bus around the US, Paul and Taeko departed the U.S. for Japan in 1939.

== Early military service ==
In Tokyo, Tatsuguchi was aware of the rising tensions between Japan and the United States. Although he was strongly loyal to his native country, he also shared with Taeko a love of the US, to which they hoped to return to live someday. Tatsuguchi concentrated on his work at the sanitorium, and, with Taeko, supported activities for the Adventist church, of which they were devout members. In September 1940 their first daughter, Joy Misako, was born.

Early the next year, the IJA—the conscription authority in Japan—ordered Tatsuguchi to leave his medical practice and report to the First Imperial Guard Regiment (FIGR) in Tokyo, where he was inducted with the rank of private on January 10, 1941. As he was stationed in Tokyo, Tatsuguchi was occasionally able to visit Taeko and Misako when his duties allowed. Misako said of this time that, "I only have one memory of my father, and that was playing hide and seek with him."

In September 1941, Tatsuguchi entered the IJA's medical school. He graduated in October and was promoted to sergeant major, rejoining the FIGR in January 1942. In the meantime, on December 7, 1941, the Japanese attacked the United States at Pearl Harbor. The next day, Japan declared war on the US and its allies. Suspicious of Tatsuguchi's American background, the IJA never gave him officer status, instead designating him as a non-commissioned acting medical officer.

Over the next several months, Tatsuguchi was deployed to the South Pacific in support of IJA units in the Dutch East Indies. During his service, Tatsuguchi kept a diary, recording his first-hand observations of military service as well as his thoughts and feelings about the events in which he was involved. In September 1942, after learning that he would be reassigned to a combat area in Rabaul, New Britain, he noted in his diary, "I feel very happy and I am determined to do my best", adding that he was "determined to destroy the enemy force to the very last soldier".

Tatsuguchi reached Rabaul on October 4, 1942. His stay there was probably short, for his wife recorded that he joined her in Tokyo that same month prior to being redeployed. Tatsuguchi was unable to tell his wife, now pregnant with their second child, where he would be assigned, but she noticed that he studied maps of the North Pacific area. At one point, he remarked to Taeko that he was going to an area where he might meet some of his former classmates from California.

A few weeks after Tatsuguchi left for his new assignment, the IJA delivered a lock of his hair to Taeko. The IJA did this whenever soldiers were sent to a high-risk combat area in case the soldier was killed and it proved impossible to repatriate the remains for proper funeral rites.

== Attu ==
=== Arrival ===
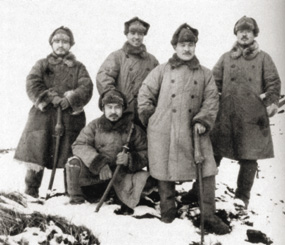
Japanese troops on Attu

Japanese forces had first occupied Attu and Kiska in the Aleutian Islands, Alaska, on June 7, 1942, during the Battle of Midway. They abandoned Attu in September 1942, but then decided to reoccupy it. A regiment of IJA soldiers from the Northern Sea Detachment (北海支隊, Hokkai Shitai), a detachment of Imperial Japanese Navy (IJN) Special Naval Landing Force troops, and support personnel began arriving on Attu in October 1942. The total number of Japanese on the island would eventually be between 2,500 and 2,900 men. Tatsuguchi arrived on Attu on March 10, 1943, on the last full convoy to reach the island. While most of the North Sea Defense Field Hospital located on Kiska, Tatsuguchi was part of a 24-man team who set up a small hospital on Attu.

With an American naval blockade in place, mail between Attu and Japan was infrequent and unscheduled. Tatsuguchi received several small packages from Taeko containing cookies and ointment for his skin, which was chafed by Attu's severe winter winds. Four letters and several postcards from Tatsuguchi reached Taeko. As he was forbidden from discussing his unit's exact location or mission, Tatsuguchi wrote about the weather, the beauty of the snowy and mountainous landscape around him, and his success in catching fish. He was cheered by the news from Taeko that their second daughter, Laura Mutsuko, was born in February. Tatsuguchi reminded Taeko in his letters to play classical music for their daughters.

=== Battle of Attu ===
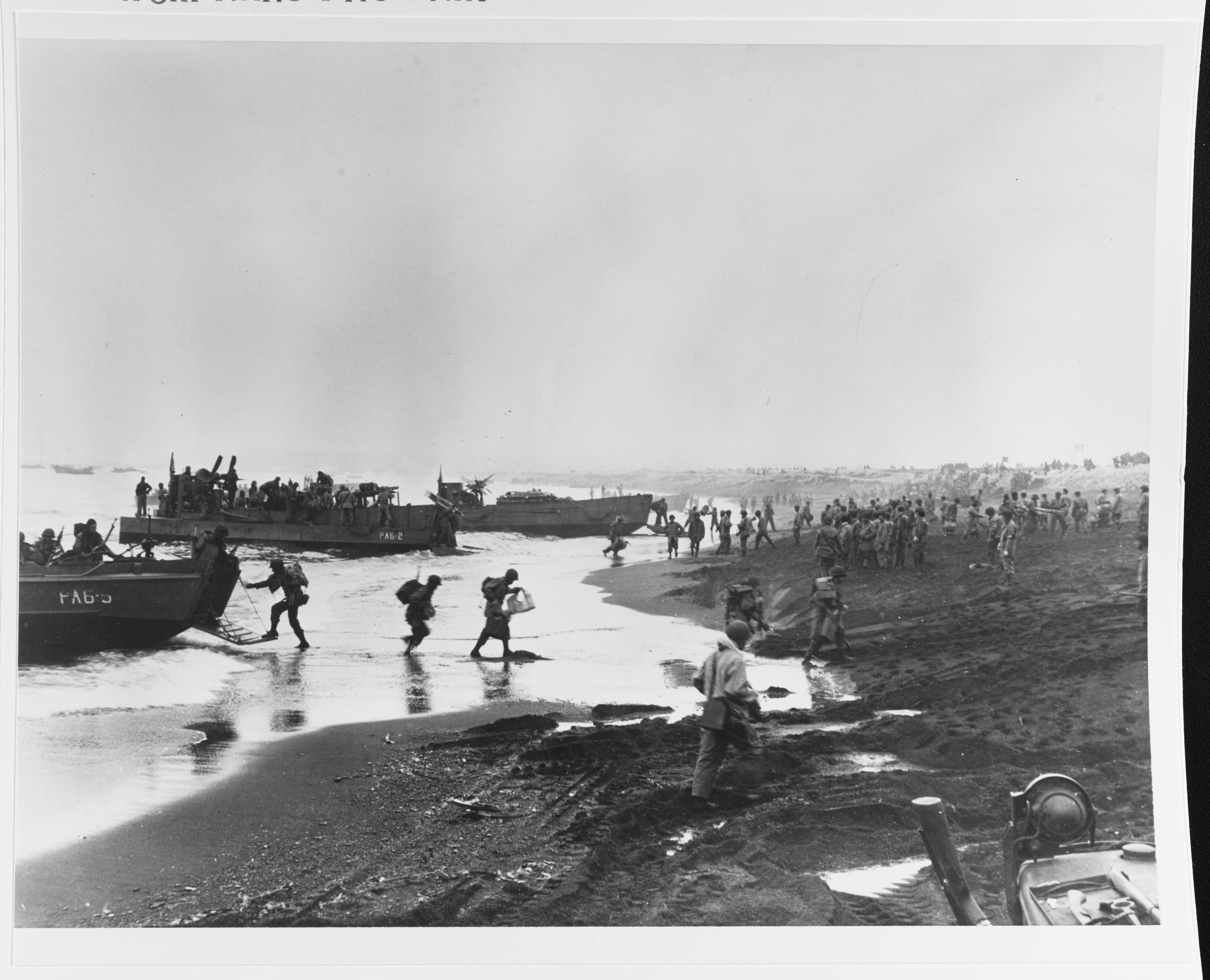
American troops land supplies on Attu on May 12

On May 11, 1943, the American Seventh Infantry Division began landing on Attu to retake the island from the Japanese. The Japanese commander on Attu, Yasuyo Yamasaki, positioned his troops—who were outnumbered five to one—in the mountains from where they temporarily delayed the Americans' advance inland. Tatsuguchi's diary entry on May 12 records the Japanese move into the mountains after the American landings, stating simply "evacuated to the summit. Air raids carried out frequently. Heard loud noise, it is naval gunfire. Prepared battle equipment."

On May 14, American artillery fired phosphorus smoke shells to mark Japanese positions in the mountains. Many Japanese and Americans believed these were poison gas shells. Tatsuguchi noted in his diary that, "In the enemy the U.S. Forces used gas but no damage was done on account of strong wind."

Tatsuguchi recorded in his diary that he was forced to move his field hospital into a cave to escape American naval and aerial bombardment. He relocated the hospital and patients several times as the Japanese forces were pushed back by the Americans. His May 17 entry describes one of the moves:

At night about 11:30 o'clock under cover of darkness I left the cave. Walked over muddy roads and steep hills of no-man's land. No matter how far or how much we went we did not get over the pass. Sat down after 30–40 steps would sleep dream and wake up, same thing over again. We had few wounded and had to carry them on stretchers. They got frost-bitten feet, did not move after all the effort. After struggling all the time, had expended nine hours, for all this without leaving any patients.

Tatsuguchi refers again and again in his diary to the constant, intense attacks by American aircraft and artillery on his comrades' positions. On May 21, he noted that he "was strafed when amputating a patient's arm" and on May 23 that "by naval gun fire a hit was scored on the pillar pole of tents for patients and the tents gave in and killed two instantly. No food for two days." On May 26, Tatsuguchi recorded that "there was a ceremony of granting of the Imperial Edict. The last line of Umanose [Japanese defensive position] was broken through. No hope for reinforcements. We will die for cause of Imperial Edict."

=== Final attack and death ===
By May 28 about a thousand Japanese remained, compressed into a small pocket. Yamasaki, apparently realizing that help from Japan was not forthcoming, decided on one last, desperate measure to try to save his command from destruction. On May 29, Yamasaki organized a surprise attack on American positions. Yamasaki hoped to break through the enemy's front lines and seize the American artillery batteries, which would then be turned on the rest of the American forces and their ships offshore. Tatsuguchi's last diary entry records Yamasaki's order, the disposition of the wounded in his hospital, and a farewell message to his family:

Today at 2 o'clock we assembled at Headquarters, the field hospital took also part. The last assault is to be carried out. All the patients in the hospital were made to commit suicide. I am only 33 years old and I am to die. Have no regrets. Banzai to the Emperor. I am grateful that I have kept the peace in my soul which Enkis [believed to mean either Christ or the Edict] bestowed on me at 8 o'clock. I took care of all patients with a grenade. Goodbye Iaeke [Taeko], my beloved wife, who loved me to the last. Until we meet again grant you God-speed Misaka [Misako], who just became four years old, will grow up unhindered. If I feel sorry for you Takiko [Mutsuko] born February this year and gone before without seeing your father. Well goodbye Mitsue, Brothers Hocan, Sukoshan, Masachan, Mitichan, goodbye. The number participating in this attack is a little over a thousand. Will try to take enemy artillery position. It seems the enemy will probably make an all-out attack tomorrow.

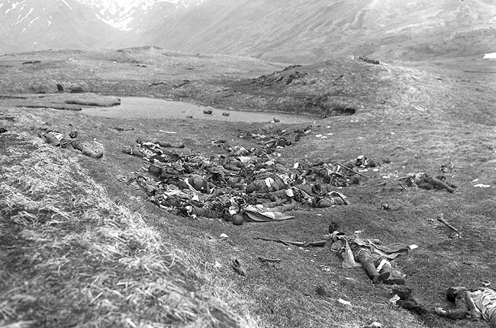
Japanese troops killed during Yamasaki's final attack on May 30

Yamasaki launched his attack early in the morning on May 30. Although the attack succeeded in penetrating the enemy lines, American rear-area personnel rallied and killed Yamasaki and the majority of his attacking troops. Most of the remaining Japanese then committed suicide; only 27 were taken prisoner.

Two versions exist of how Tatsuguchi died. One version is that he did not participate in the attack. Later in the day on May 30, two American soldiers, Charles W. Laird and John Hirn, who were searching for remaining Japanese forces following the defeat of Yamasaki's attack, approached the cave containing Tatsuguchi's field hospital. Tatsuguchi emerged from the cave, waving his Bible in the direction of the Americans and yelling in English, "Don't shoot! I am a Christian!" Laird heard and understood what Tatsuguchi was saying and withheld fire. Hirn, however, shot and killed Tatsuguchi. Hirn later stated that he could not hear what Tatsuguchi was saying over the wind and noise of battle and that he thought that the Bible Tatsuguchi was holding was a weapon.

The other version was told to Taeko and Laura by Laird in 1984. Laird stated that he was sleeping in a tent the morning of May 30 when Yamasaki's troops broke through the American front lines. A man ran into Laird's tent and Laird shot and killed him, only to discover that the man was American. Then he saw eight Japanese soldiers approaching through the fog, so he shot and killed them too. One of them was Tatsuguchi. Laird said that he found Tatsuguchi's diary and an address book in which he was shocked to see American names and addresses.

J. Mudry and another of Tatsuguchi's Loma Linda classmates, J. L. Whitaker, were medical officers with the US Seventh Division on Attu during the battle. Whitaker was in the path of Yamasaki's final attack, but survived without injury. Whitaker and Mudry were stunned to later learn that their former classmate was on the island with Japanese forces and was killed nearby.

== Diary ==
After Tatsuguchi's death his Japanese diary, as well as his Bible, a copy of Gray's Anatomy and an address book, were forwarded to the division intelligence section. There, an American Nisei serviceman named Yasuo Sam Umetani drafted the first translation of the diary.

Word of the diary's contents spread quickly through divisional headquarters to the other American troops on Attu. Americans were intrigued by the news that an American-trained doctor had been with the Japanese forces on the island and that Tatsuguchi had described the battle from a Japanese perspective. Unauthorized copies of both Umetani's version and subsequent translations, some of which contained variations, were passed around among the American troops on Attu and to military installations on other Aleutian islands. Civilian crews of transport ships in the area who obtained copies of the diary translation took their copies with them across the United States, where it drew the attention of the press and gained wide public exposure.

Simon Bolivar Buckner Jr., the US commander of the Alaska Defense Command (ADC), on learning that the diary claimed that the Americans had used poison gas in the Attu battle, ordered that all copies of the translations be confiscated. In transit to Buckner's headquarters, the diary original itself vanished without trace, and its whereabouts are unknown to this day. Japanese versions are translated from the English translation. In early September 1943, the ADC's intelligence section reported that efforts to control the distribution of translated copies of the diary had failed.

Several American newspapers published excerpts from the diary, and most highlighted the possibility that Tatsuguchi, a professed Christian, might have been involved in the killing of wounded patients. The Chicago Tribune on September 9, 1943, published an article headlined "Japs Slew Own Patients on Attu, Diary Discloses". In contrast, the Loma Linda School of Medicine Alumni Journal defended Tatsuguchi as a gentle and caring doctor who was trapped in a situation beyond his control, where his actions violated neither his religious beliefs nor his oaths as a doctor. Most Western historical accounts of the Battle of Attu mention Tatsuguchi and quote from his diary, especially the final entry.

== Family legacy ==
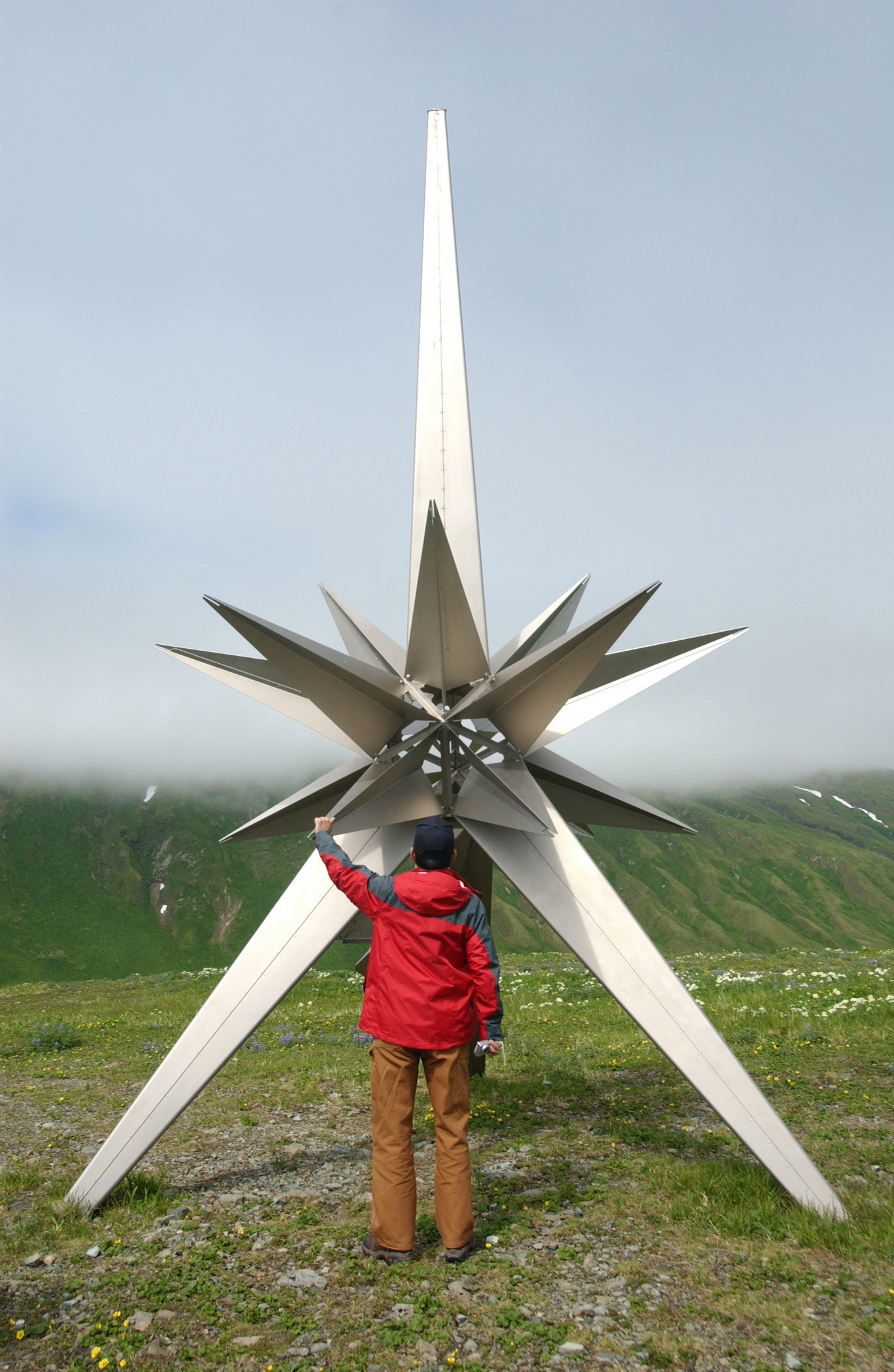
Peace monument on Attu erected by the Japanese government

The Japanese government notified Taeko of her husband's death in August 1943. Taeko and her two daughters survived the remainder of the war on a small widow's pension and with help from relatives. Taeko hoped that her husband was still alive and would return. Just after the war ended, B. P. Hoffman, one of Tatsuguchi's former college instructors and a friend of Taeko's, visited her in Osaka where she was living. Hoffman told her that a Federal Bureau of Investigation agent had visited him during the war because Hoffman's name was in Tatsuguchi's address book found on Attu. The agent told the story of Tatsuguchi's death to Hoffman, who related it to Taeko. Taeko accepted that her husband would not be coming back.

After the war, Taeko worked for the American occupation forces as a secretary and teacher. In 1954, she and her two daughters, Joy and Laura, left Japan and joined Taeko's parents in Hawaii. All three became naturalized citizens of the US. Joy and Laura both attended Pacific Union College and became nurses. Joy later married a Japanese man and returned to Japan to live. Laura married an American and moved to the Los Angeles area, where Taeko later joined her. In 2005, Taeko told Kyodo News of her husband, "He was a faithful Christian doctor and a gentleman who devoted himself to God and communities."

In May 1993, Laura traveled to Attu and spoke at a 50th Anniversary commemorative event of the Battle of Attu. In her speech at the event, Laura stated "How ironic that my father was killed in combat against his beloved America while in loyal service to his Japanese homeland ... Like my father, I too have a great love for Japan and America."
