= Massacre Bay (Alaska) =

Bay in Attu, Alaska

- Interactive map of Massacre Bay
- Coordinates: 52°49′36″N 173°13′12″E

Massacre Bay is an inlet on the southeast coast of Attu Island, the westernmost of the Aleutian Islands of Alaska. It was among the first areas where early Aleut colonists settled. The bay takes its name from a massacre of Aleuts perpetrated by Russian fur traders in 1745. During World War II, in the Battle of Attu in May 1943, it was a landing point for U.S. Army troops who ultimately recaptured the island from Japanese forces.

== History ==
Early Aleut colonists chose Massacre Bay as the location of their first settlement on Attu. It was one of four resource-rich areas in the Aleutian Islands where the colonists settled, the others being Aga Cove and Krugloi Point on Agattu, situated southeast of Attu.

In September 1745, the first Russians – a group of fur traders – arrived in Attu after being driven away by armed men from the more populous Agattu. They kidnapped an Aleut boy and old woman, keeping the former to train as a translator. A few weeks later, another party of Russians arrived at a settlement in Massacre Bay, killing 15 men in order to kidnap the women. This event gave the bay its name. At the end of the 18th century, there was a small community on Attu with about 20 able-bodied men inhabiting two settlements: one in Massacre Bay and another in Chichagof Harbor.

Massacre Bay was among the landing sites of U.S. Army troops in the Battle of Attu in May 1943, which led to the recapture of the island from the Japanese during World War II. A southern force consisting of two battalions from the 17th Infantry Regiment were set to land in Massacre Bay on the morning of May 11. However, heavy fog delayed their arrival until the late afternoon. When they landed, the Americans met no initial resistance, but upon reaching the ridges around upper Massacre Valley, where Japanese defenses had been entrenched, they received heavy machine gun fire. The Americans were able to push past Japanese positions a few days later with the help of reinforcements.
