= Albert E. Brown =

U.S. Army Major General

Albert Eger Brown
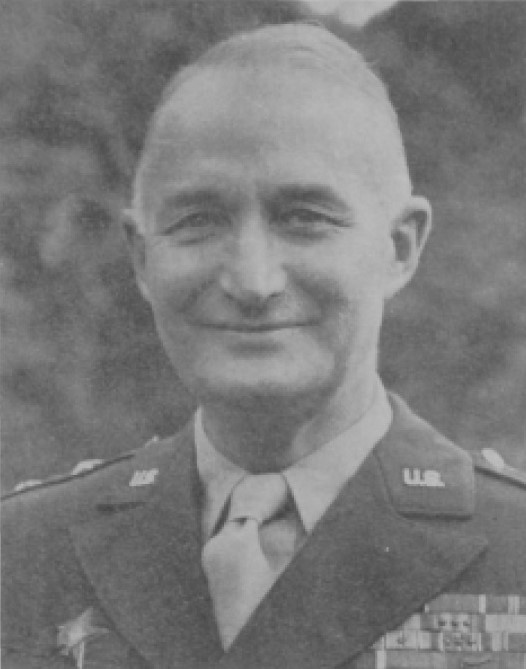
- Born: June 13, 1889; Charleston, South Carolina, U.S.
- Died: October 12, 1984 (aged 95); Nashville, Tennessee, U.S.
- Military career
- Allegiance: United States
- Branch: United States Army
- Service years: 1912–1949
- Rank: Major General
- Nickname: "Burfy"
- Unit: Infantry Branch
- Commands: 6th Infantry Division; 5th Infantry Division; 7th Infantry Division; 1st Battalion, 38th Infantry Regiment; 1st Battalion, 29th Infantry Regiment
- Conflicts: Border War; Banana Wars; Occupation of Veracruz; World War I; Meuse-Argonne Offensive; World War II; Aleutian Islands campaign; Western Allied invasion of Germany; Ruhr pocket; Occupation of Germany; Operation Blacklist Forty
- Awards: Legion of Merit (2); Bronze Star; Legion of Honour; Croix de Guerre; Order of the Red Star (USSR)

Major General Albert Eger Brown (June 13, 1889 – October 12, 1984) was a decorated officer in the United States Army. A graduate of West Point, he was a veteran of Pancho Villa Expedition and both World Wars and is most noted for his service as commanding general (CG) of the 7th Infantry Division during the Aleutian Islands campaign of World War II.

Following the War, Brown served as chairman of the Joint U.S.–USSR Commission on Korea and his main task was to administer South Korea and negotiate with the Soviet delegation. He completed his career in 1949 as commanding general, Northern Military District of Sixth U.S. Army with headquarters at Vancouver Barracks in Washington.

== Early career ==
Albert Eger Brown was born on June 13, 1889, in Charleston, South Carolina, the son of Samuel Claude Brown and Fannie May Hertz. His father, whose family had emigrated to the United States from Scotland, served as part-owner and general manager of Bolton Mining Company, a phosphate rock mining company near Charleston.

Young Albert completed public and private schools in Charleston and graduated from the Charleston High School in summer 1907. He entered the College of Charleston, but left the following year, after he received an appointment to the United States Military Academy (USMA) at West Point, New York. He was active in football squad and shooting team and earned the nickname "Burfy".

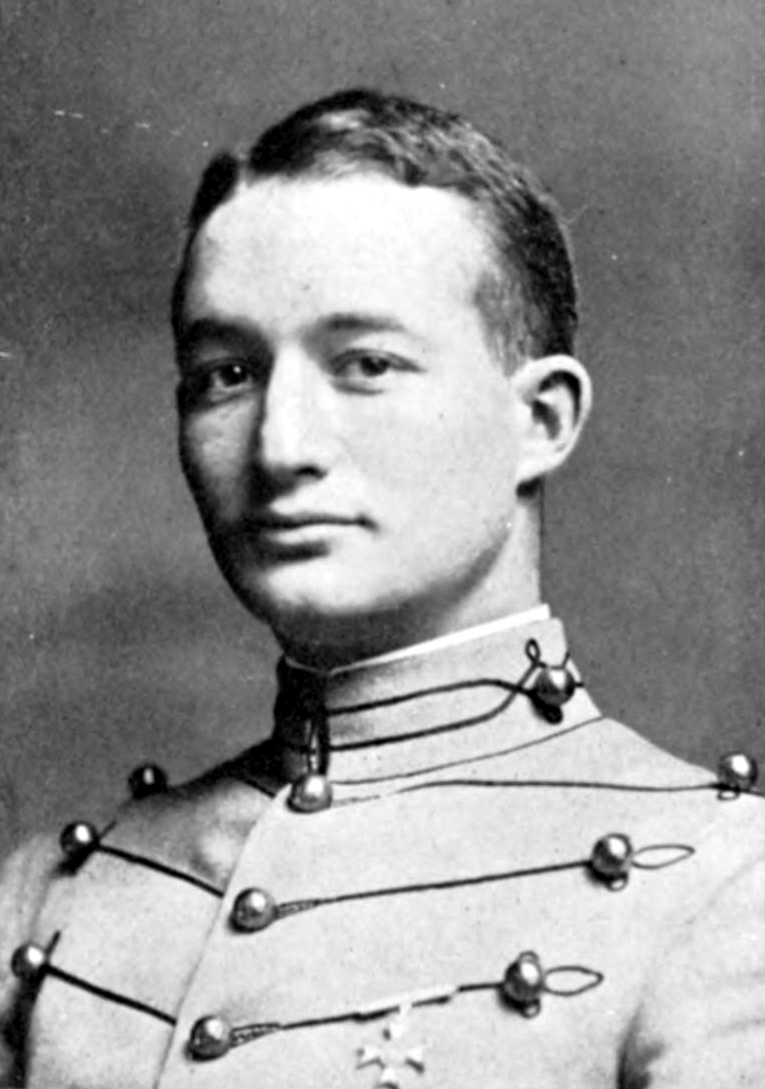
At West Point in 1912

He graduated 78th in a class of 95 on June 12, 1912, with a Bachelor of Science degree and was commissioned second lieutenant in the Infantry Branch. Brown was then assigned to the 4th Infantry Regiment stationed at Fort Crook, Nebraska, and accompanied the regiment to Galveston, Texas, in January 1913 during the Border War with Mexican insurgents under Pancho Villa.

Brown served on the Mexican border at Galveston until April 1914, when he sailed with his regiment to Veracruz, Mexico, for occupation duty following a United States landing. He was promoted to first lieutenant in July 1916 and assumed command of an infantry company of his regiment at Brownsville.

Following the American entry into World War I in April 1917, Brown was promoted to captain on May 15, and was ordered to Gettysburg, Pennsylvania, where he joined the newly activated 59th Infantry Regiment and became the regimental adjutant. He remained with that outfit until November that year, when he was sent to Camp Greene, North Carolina, for service as adjutant of the 8th Brigade, 4th Division, under Brigadier General Samuel W. Miller.

Brown was promoted to the temporary rank of major and embarked for France in June 1918. He participated in the Aisne-Marne Offensive and was named adjutant of the 92nd Division's 183rd Brigade, then commanded by Brigadier General Charles Gerhardt one month later. He took part in the combats in the Vosges Mountains, Argonne Forest and Marbache sector and following the Armistice with Germany on November 11, 1918, he was attached to the headquarters of the 92nd Division under Brigadier General James B. Erwin.

== Between the wars ==
Brown returned with the division to the United States in February 1919 and served for short periods at Camp Upton, New York and Camp Meade, Maryland, before he was appointed Inspector for the 8th District of the Reserve Officers' Training Corps (ROTC) at Kansas City, Missouri, in April 1919. He was also reverted to the peacetime rank of captain.

He spent four years in this capacity and received a permanent rank of major in April 1923, when he was appointed Professor of Military Science and Tactics at the University of North Dakota in Grand Forks. Brown was ordered to the Army Infantry School at Fort Benning, Georgia in September that year and completed Infantry officers course in June 1924.

Another schooling took place shortly thereafter, when he was ordered as a student to the Army Command and General Staff School at Fort Leavenworth, Kansas. Brown graduated in June 1925 and served at Fort Benjamin Harrison, Indiana, for some time, before embarked for Hawaii for staff duties with the Hawaiian Department, then commanded by Major General Edward Mann Lewis.

Brown returned to the United States in June 1929 and enrolled the Army War College in Washington, D.C., where he graduated following June. He then entered the Naval War College at Newport, Rhode Island, in July 1930, graduating in June 1931.

He was then ordered back to Washington and joined the War Department General Staff, where he served under General Douglas MacArthur, the Chief of Staff of the United States Army, until October 1935. While in this capacity, Brown was promoted to lieutenant colonel in August 1935.

His next tour of duty took him back to Fort Benning, where he was attached to the Infantry Board, which supervised the development of all weapons and equipment for the Infantry. He then served as commanding officer (CO) of the 1st Battalion, 29th Infantry Regiment from September 1938 to May 1939, when he was transferred to command of 1st Battalion, 38th Infantry Regiment. While in this capacity as battalion commander, he participated in the demonstration of infantry tactics and operations for student officers at Fort Benning.

Brown returned to Washington in April 1940 and assumed duty as Assistant to Chief of Budget & Legislative Planning Board, War Department General Staff. Following his promotion to colonel in February 1941, he was appointed Chief of the Budget & Legislative Planning Board. While in this capacity, Brown was responsible for the preparation of requests for funds and legislation for Congress and was promoted to the temporary rank of brigadier general in August 1941.

== World War II ==
Following the Japanese attack on Pearl Harbor and the American entry into World War II in December 1941, Brown was ordered to Fort Ord, California, and appointed assistant division commander (ADC) of the 7th Infantry Division under Major General Charles H. White. Brown took part in the amphibious training at the Salinas River in California and following a promotion to the temporary rank of major general in May 1942, he relieved White in command of the 7th Division.

He spent several month with training at Camp San Luis Obispo, California, and participated in the desert training in the Mojave Desert and later in the amphibious training under Major General Holland Smith of the United States Marine Corps (USMC) .

=== Aleutian Islands ===
Following the Japanese landing at Kiska and Attu, Aleutian Islands, Brown was tasked with the command of Task force for the capture of Attu. He landed on Attu on D-Day, May 11, 1943, and began advance inland. The progress of his men was slow due to many machine gun nests and sniper fire and Brown requested additional naval bombardment support and more reinforcements. Admiral Thomas C. Kinkaid, Commander of the North Pacific Force, who held overall command of the operation, feared of Japanese submarines, which attacked his vessels few days earlier. Brown continued requesting reinforcements and large quantities of engineering and road building equipment, but Kinkaid questioned the request and the lack of any positive indications of a speedy breakthrough persuaded him that Brown was bogged down.

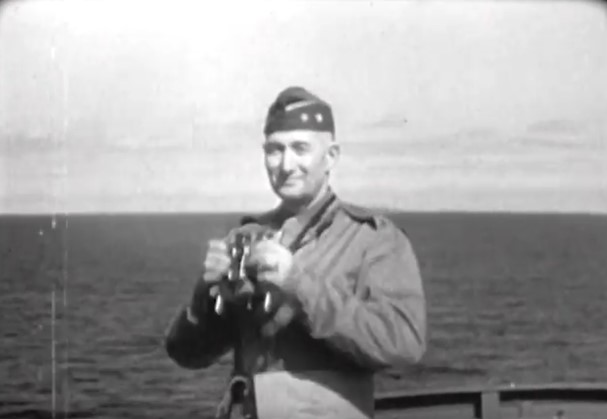
Major General Brown at the invasion of Attu, Alaska, May 1943

Kinkaid consulted the situation with generals DeWitt and Buckner Jr., who recommended that General Brown be relieved of his command. Brown was succeeded by Major general Eugene M. Landrum as Task Force Commander and ordered back to the United States for new assignment.

=== Stateside duty ===
Upon his arrival stateside, Brown was given non-combat duty as Commanding general, Infantry Replacement Training Center at Camp Wheeler, Georgia. It seemed that he would spend the rest of the war stateside, but he received another chance when he was offered assignment of a battlefield command in Europe.

=== European Theater of Operations ===
In December 1944, Brown was ordered to the European Theater of Operations (E.T.O.) and joined the headquarters of the 35th Infantry Division, under Major General Paul W. Baade, in Belgium for a brief period. He was then appointed Commanding general, Ground Force Reinforcement Command, U.S. E.T.O. and was responsible for the supplying of reinforcements to all units in the E.T.O. until the beginning of April 1945, when he assumed command of the 5th Infantry Division, following Major General Stafford LeRoy Irwin's promotion to XII Corps command.

Brown led the division during the clearing of the Ruhr Pocket and then drove the Germans from the Lower Bavaria, Austria, and ultimately crossed the Czechoslovak border on May 1, 1945. The division participated in the combats against retreating German forces until it reached the demarcation line near Vimperk and Volary. When stationed in Czechoslovakia following the surrender of Nazi Germany, divisional troops discovered shallow graves of Jewish death march victims from Helmbrechts concentration camp, who were starved to death by German SS Troops.

Brown ordered German civilians from a nearby town to exhume and rebury them in the cemetery in Volary. He also forced the German civilians to walk past the dead bodies. For his service in Germany, Austria and Czechoslovakia, Brown was decorated with the Legion of Merit and Bronze Star Medal. He also received the Legion of Honour and Croix de Guerre with Palm from France; the War Cross from Czechoslovakia and the Order of the Red Star from the Soviet Red Army.

== Postwar service ==
Brown spent several weeks on occupation duty in southeast Lower Bavaria, where his division was responsible for resettlement of displaced persons, supplying of German civilians with food, medical care and maintaining of civil order. By the end of June, Fifth Division began its redeployment to the United States, where it arrived in late July 1945. The division was subsequently stationed at Fort Campbell, Kentucky, where Brown supervised the preparation for division's redeployment to the Pacific theater.

The surrender of Japan on August 15, changed the situation and Brown was now responsible for the demobilization of his troops until June 1946, when he was himself ordered to the Pacific area for new assignment. Brown assumed command of 6th Infantry Division in Korea, which controlled southern half of the United States occupation zone and remained in that capacity until September that year, when he was appointed Chairman of Joint U.S.-USSR Commission on Korea. His main task was to administer South Korea and negotiate with Soviet delegation under Colonel general Terentii Shtykov, who was then responsible for the administration of North Korea.

Brown remained in this capacity until December 1946, when he was appointed Deputy Commanding general, U.S. Army Forces in Korea under lieutenant general John R. Hodge. He also served as interim commanding general from February to April 1947 during general Hodge's absence and then resumed his duties as Deputy Commanding general. Brown served in Korea until March 1948 and received his second Legion of Merit for service there. The citation for the medal reads:

The President of the United States of America, authorized by Act of Congress, 20 July 1942, takes pleasure in presenting a Bronze Oak Leaf Cluster in lieu of a Second Award of the Legion of Merit to Major General Albert Eger Brown, United States Army, for exceptionally meritorious conduct in the performance of outstanding services to the Government of the United States as Deputy Commanding General and Commanding General, U.S. Army Forces in Korea, from September 1946 to November 1947.

Upon his return stateside in September 1948, Brown was appointed Commanding general, Northern Military District of Sixth U.S. Army with headquarters at Vancouver Barracks, Washington. During the same period, he demanded that his case of relieving at Attu in April 1943 be reviewed and after long and acrimonious series of hearings, Brown was formally cleared of any misconduct in 1949.

Brown retired from the army on June 30, 1949, after 37 years of active service and settled in Asheville, North Carolina. He and his wife then moved to Nashville, Tennessee, where he died on October 12, 1984, aged 95. Major General Albert E. Brown was buried with full military honors at Arlington National Cemetery, Virginia, beside his wife Jesse Sewell Weaver Brown (1889–1982) and his son Albert E. Brown Jr., who died in a traffic accident in 1940, after his graduation from West Point.

== Decorations ==
Major General Albert E. Brown's ribbon bar:

| 1st Row | Legion of Merit with Oak Leaf Cluster | | Bronze Star Medal | |
| 2nd Row | Mexican Service Medal | World War I Victory Medal with three Battle Clasps | American Defense Service Medal | American Campaign Medal |
| 3rd Row | Asiatic–Pacific Campaign Medal with one 3/16 inch service star | European-African-Middle Eastern Campaign Medal with three 3/16 inch service stars | World War II Victory Medal | Army of Occupation Medal |
| 4th Row | Officer of the Legion of Honor (France) | French Croix de guerre 1939-1945 with Palm | Czechoslovak War Cross 1939-1945 | Order of the Red Star (USSR) |

Military offices
| Preceded by Charles H. White | Commanding General 7th Infantry Division; 1942–1943 | Succeeded by Charles H. Corlett |
| Preceded by Stafford LeRoy Irwin | Commanding General 5th Infantry Division; 1945–1946 | Succeeded by Jens A. Doe |
| Preceded by George M. Williamson Jr. | Commanding General 6th Infantry Division; June−September 1946 | Succeeded by John T. Pierce |
