= Battle of Attu =

1943 battle in the Pacific Theatre of World War II

- Part of the Aleutian Islands campaign
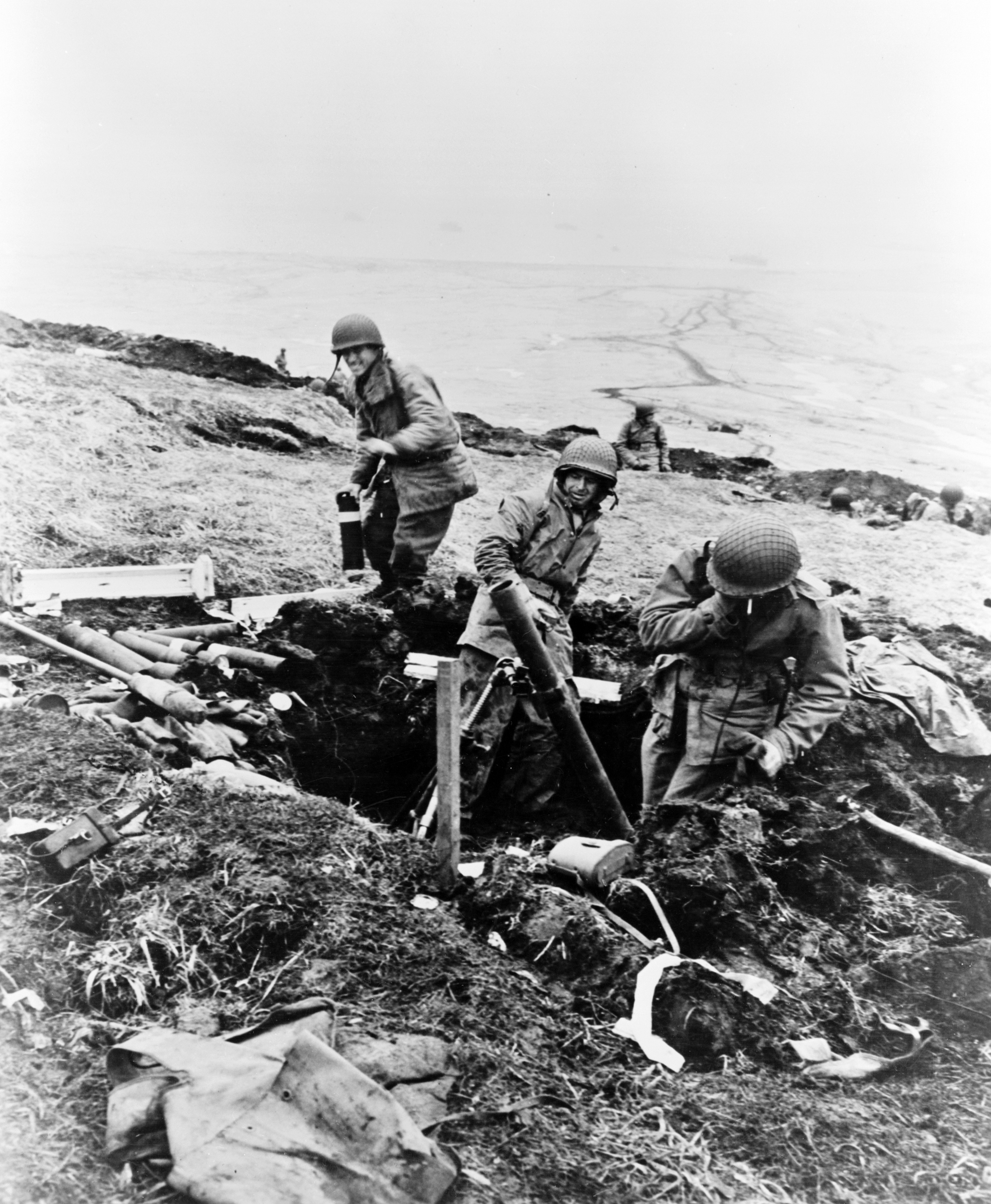
- U.S. soldiers fire mortar shells over a ridge onto a Japanese position on 4 June 1943
Date	11–30 May 1943; Japanese holdouts until 8 September 1943
Location	Attu, Aleutian Islands, Territory of Alaska, United States 52°52′44″N 173°09′24″E
Result	Allied victory

Belligerents
United States; Canada	Japan

Commanders and leaders
John DeWitt; Thomas Kinkaid; Albert Brown; Eugene Landrum; Archibald Arnold	Yasuyo Yamasaki †

Strength
15,000	2,600

Casualties and losses
549 killed 1,148 wounded 1,814 frostbitten and sick	2,351 killed or committed suicide 28 captured ~200 missing or holding out
- Location within Alaska Battle of Attu (Pacific Ocean)

The Battle of Attu (codenamed Operation Landcrab), which took place on 11–30 May 1943, was fought between forces of the United States, aided by Canadian reconnaissance and fighter-bomber support, and Japan on Attu Island off the coast of the Territory of Alaska as part of the Aleutian Islands campaign during the American Theater and the Pacific Theater. Attu was the site of the only land battle fought on the North American continent during World War II. It was also the only land battle in which Japanese and American forces fought in snowy conditions, in contrast with the tropical climate in the rest of the Pacific. The battle ended when most of the Japanese defenders were killed in brutal hand-to-hand combat after a final banzai charge broke through American lines.

== Background ==
The strategic position of the islands of Attu and Kiska off Alaska's coast meant their locations could control the sea lanes across the northern Pacific Ocean. Japanese planners believed control of the Aleutians would therefore prevent any possible U.S. attacks from Alaska. This assessment had already been inferred by U.S. General Billy Mitchell, who told the U.S. Congress in 1935, "I believe that in the future, whoever holds Alaska will hold the world. I think it is the most important strategic place in the world."

On 7 June 1942, six months after the United States entered World War II, the 301st Independent Infantry Battalion from the Japanese Northern Army landed unopposed on Attu. The landings occurred one day after the invasion of nearby Kiska. The U.S. military feared both islands could be turned into strategic Japanese airbases from which aerial attacks could be launched against mainland Alaska and the rest of the U.S. West Coast.

In Walt Disney's 1943 film Victory Through Air Power, the use of the Aleutian Islands for American long-range bombers to bomb Japan was postulated.

== Recapture ==
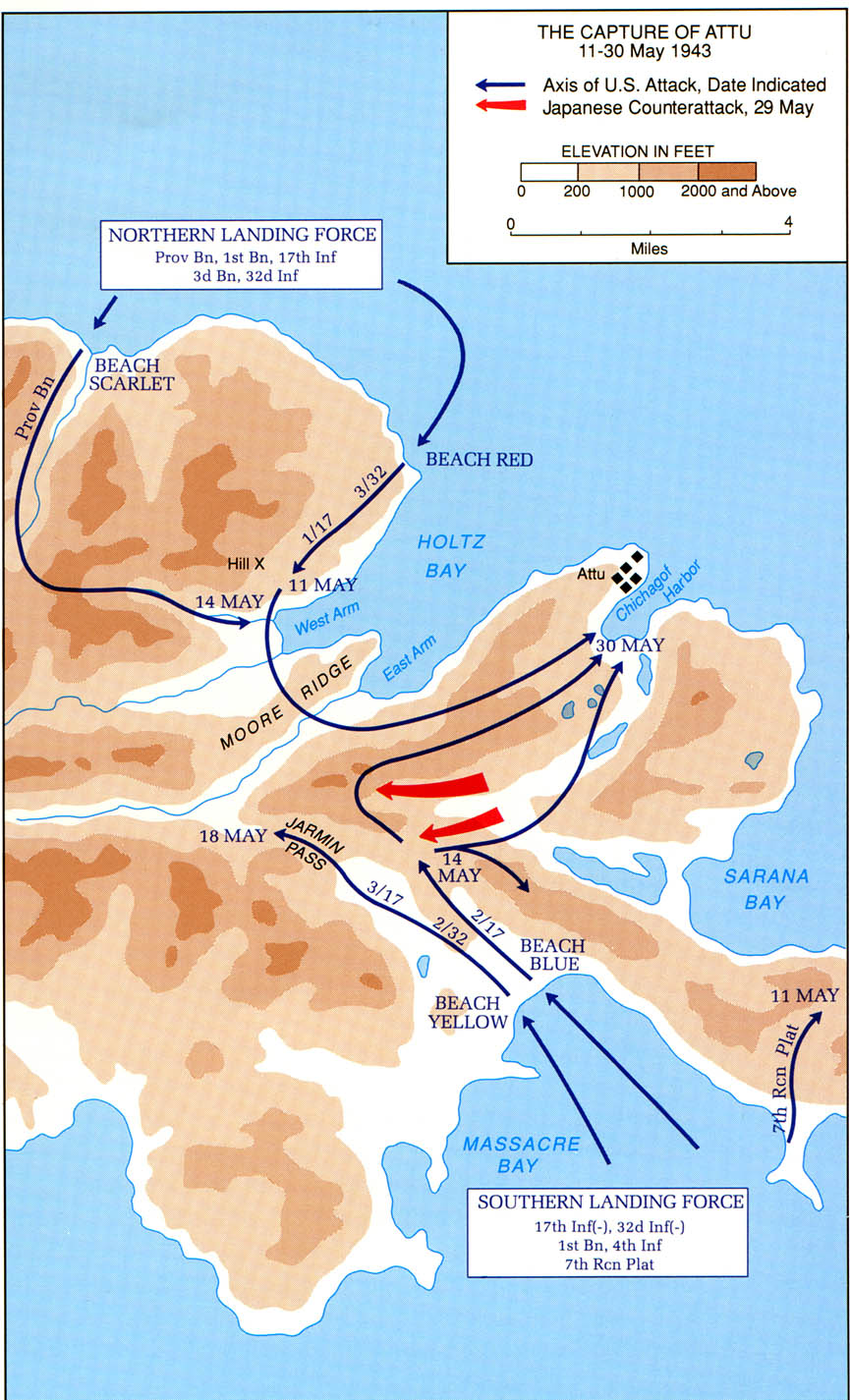
Map showing the recapture of Attu in 1943

On 11 May 1943, units from 17th Infantry, of Major General Albert E. Brown's 7th U.S. Infantry Division, made amphibious landings on Attu to retake the island from Japanese Imperial Army forces led by Colonel Yasuyo Yamasaki. Despite heavy naval bombardments of Japanese positions, the American troops encountered strong entrenched defenses that made combat conditions tough. Arctic weather and exposure-related injuries also caused numerous casualties among U.S. forces. After two weeks of relentless fighting, however, American units managed to push the Japanese defenders back to a pocket around Chichagof Harbor.

On 21–22 May, a powerful Japanese fleet assembled in Tokyo Bay in preparation for a sortie to repel the American attempt to recapture Attu. The fleet included the carriers Zuikaku, Shōkaku, Jun'yō, Hiyō, the battleships Musashi, Kongō, Haruna, and the cruisers Mogami, Kumano, Suzuya, Tone, Chikuma, Agano, Ōyodo, and eleven destroyers. The Americans, however, recaptured Attu before the fleet could depart.

On 29 May, without hope of rescue, Yamasaki led his remaining troops in a banzai charge. The surprise attack broke through the American front-line positions. Shocked American rear-echelon troops were soon fighting in hand-to-hand combat with Japanese soldiers. The battle continued until almost all of the Japanese were killed. The charge effectively ended the battle for the island, although U.S. Navy reports indicate that small groups of Japanese continued to fight until early July 1943, and isolated Japanese survivors held out until as late as 8 September 1943. In 19 days of battle, 549 soldiers of the 7th Infantry Division were killed and more than 1,200 were injured. The Japanese lost over 2,351 men, including Yamasaki; 28 prisoners were taken.

== Aftermath ==
Attu was the last action of the Aleutian Islands campaign. The Japanese Northern Army secretly evacuated its remaining garrison from nearby Kiska, ending the Japanese occupation in the Aleutian Islands on 28 July 1943.

The loss of Attu and the evacuation of Kiska came shortly after the death of Admiral Isoroku Yamamoto, who was killed by American aircraft in Operation Vengeance. These defeats compounded the demoralizing effect of losing Yamamoto on the Japanese High Command. Despite the losses, Japanese propaganda attempted to present the Aleutian Island campaign as an inspirational epic.

== Reparations and exhumation of soldiers ==
The 42 Aleut inhabitants who survived the Japanese invasion were taken to a prison camp near Otaru, Hokkaido. Sixteen of them died while they were imprisoned. After the war, surviving Attuans were barred from returning to the island since the U.S. military believed it would be too costly to rebuild the island. The survivors were then relocated to Atka Island, about 200 miles away. The last former Attu captive died in 2023.

In recent years, there have been renewed calls for reparations. One individual leading these calls is Helena Pagano, an advocate for the preservation of Attuan culture. Pagano’s great-grandfather was the last Alaska Native chief of Attu Island in the Bering Sea, and he died of starvation as a prisoner of war after Japanese forces invaded. While Japan offered survivors $4,000 annually for three years in 1951, Pagano’s grandmother rejected the payment, deeming it insufficient for the suffering endured. Her call for justice reignited after a 2024 visit to Attu, where Japanese officials, as part of ongoing efforts to recover soldiers’ remains, exhumed two sets of human bones from a former Attu village site, which the Aleut Corporation currently owns. Pagano's calls for reparations request not only further financial restitution but also the establishment of a cultural center for Attuans in Alaska, an environmental cleanup of wartime debris on Attu, and greater inclusion of Attuans in memorial efforts. Japanese government officials claim they have not received recent requests for additional restitution from Attuan descendants.

Efforts to recover the remains of Japanese soldiers who died during World War II have intensified as war veterans and their relatives age, with Japan incorporating DNA testing to aid in identification. Of the approximately 2.4 million Japanese troops who died outside Japan, the remains of just over half have been recovered. On Attu Island, Japan's first recovery mission took place in 1953, yielding the remains of about 320 soldiers, which were repatriated and stored at the Chidorigafuchi National Cemetery. Efforts to locate additional remains have faced delays, largely due to U.S. environmental regulations governing excavation activities on the island. In 2009, the U.S. required an environmental assessment, further postponing recovery operations for more than a decade. During an August 2024 visit, limited excavation under U.S. supervision led to the recovery of two sets of human remains, believed to be Japanese soldiers. These remains were sent to Anchorage for preliminary evaluation, with plans to transfer samples to Japan for DNA testing if they are confirmed as likely Japanese.

== Order of battle ==
IJA 2nd District, North Seas Garrison (Hokkai Shubitai) – Colonel Yasuyo Yamasaki

- 83rd Independent Infantry Battalion – Lieutenant-Colonel Isamu Yonegawa
- 303rd Independent Infantry Battalion "Watanabe Battalion" – Major Jokuji Watanabe
- Aoto Provisional Anti-Aircraft Battalion – Major Seiji Aoto
- Northern Kurile Fortress Infantry Battalion – Lieutenant-Colonel Hiroshi Yonekawa
- 6th Independent Mountain Artillery – Second Lieutenant Taira Endo
- 302nd Independent Engineer Company – Captain Chinzo Ono
- 6th Ship Engineer Regiment
  - 2nd Company – Captain Kobayashi

US Landing Force Attu (US 7th Infantry Division) – Major General Albert Brown, Brigadier General Eugene M. Landrum from 16 May

- Provisional Scout Battalion – Captain William H. Willoughby
  - 7th Scout Company
  - 7th Cavalry Reconnaissance Troop
- Northern Force – Colonel Frank L. Culin
  - 1st Battalion, 17th Regimental Combat Team – Lieutenant Colonel Albert V. Hartl
- Southern Force – Colonel Edward Palmer Earle †, Colonel Wayne C. Zimmerman from 12 May
  - 2nd Battalion, 17th Regimental Combat Team – Major Edward P. Smith
  - 3rd Battalion, 17th Regimental Combat Team – Major James R. Montague
  - 2nd Battalion, 32nd Regimental Combat Team – Major Charles G. Fredericks
- Reinforcements/Combat Support
  - 1st Battalion, 32nd Regimental Combat Team – Lieutenant Colonel Earnest H. Bearss
  - 3rd Battalion, 32nd Regimental Combat Team – Lieutenant Colonel John M. Finn
  - 1st Battalion, 4th Regimental Combat Team (at Adak) – Major John D. O'Reilly
  - 78th Coast Artillery (Anti-Aircraft) Regiment
  - 50th Combat Engineer Battalion

== Gallery ==
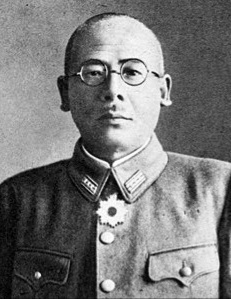
Imperial Japanese Army Colonel Yasuyo Yamasaki led Japanese forces during the Battle of Attu in May 1943. He died leading a banzai charge during the final attack.

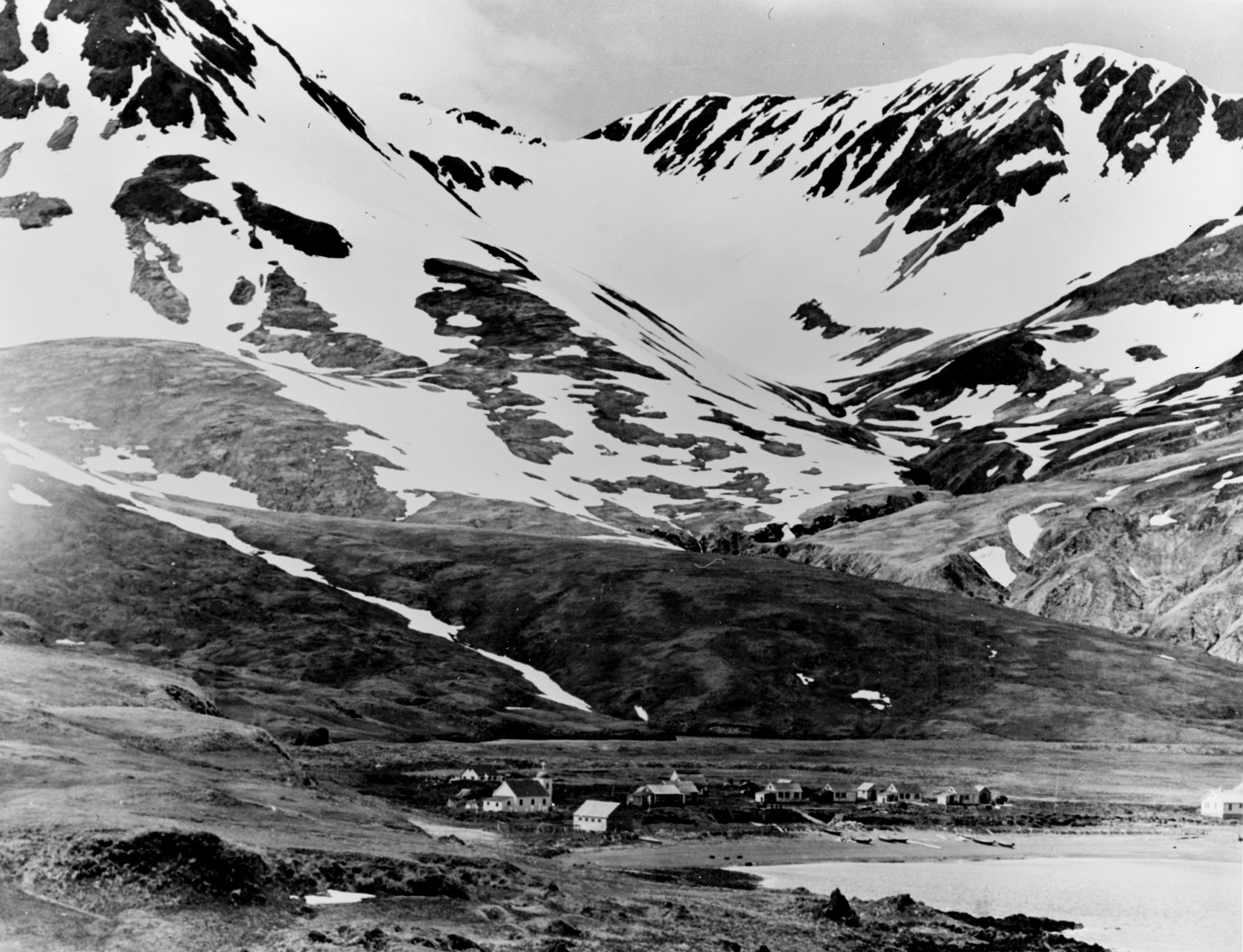
Attu village at Chichagof Harbor in 1937. It was occupied by the Japanese in 1942/43.

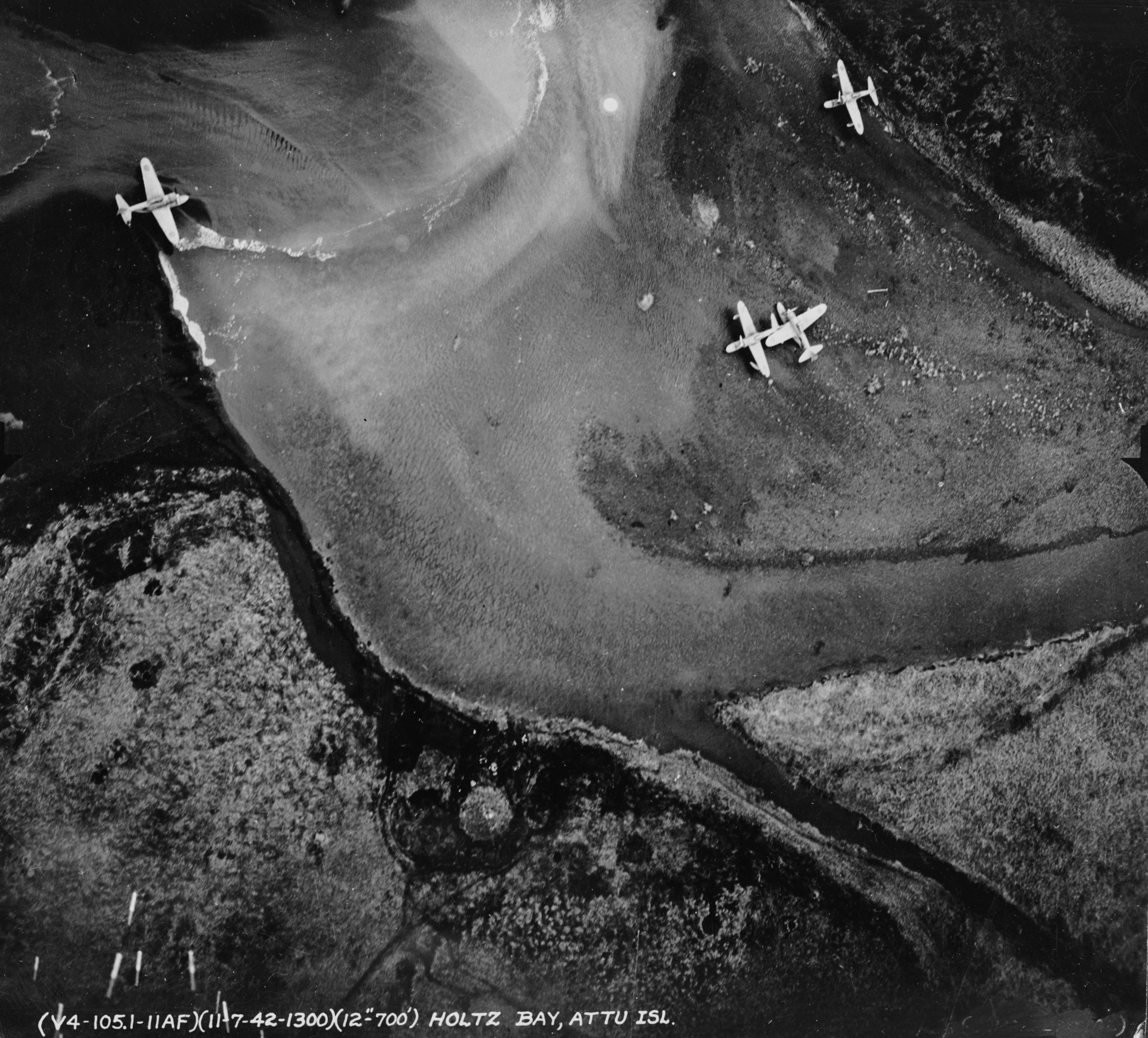
A U.S. Navy reconnaissance photo of four Japanese Mitsubishi A6M-2N Rufe seaplane fighters at Holtz Bay, Attu on 7 November 1942.

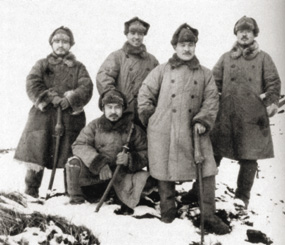
Imperial Army officers during the winter of 1942/43.

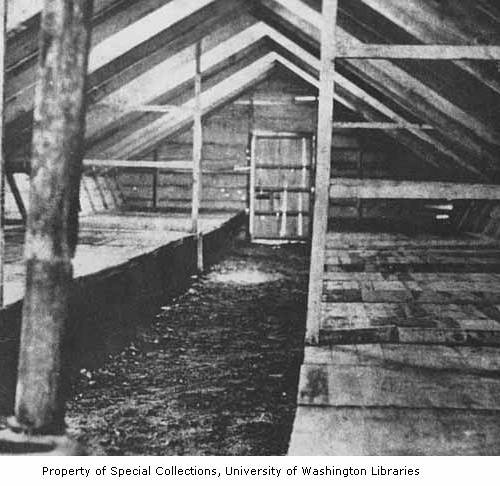
To reduce the effects of the cold, the Japanese built earthen billets on Attu.

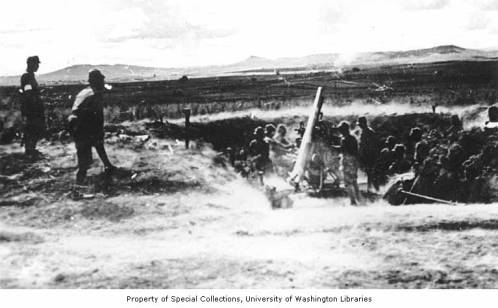
Japanese troops train with a Type 88 75 mm AA Gun on Attu in 1943.

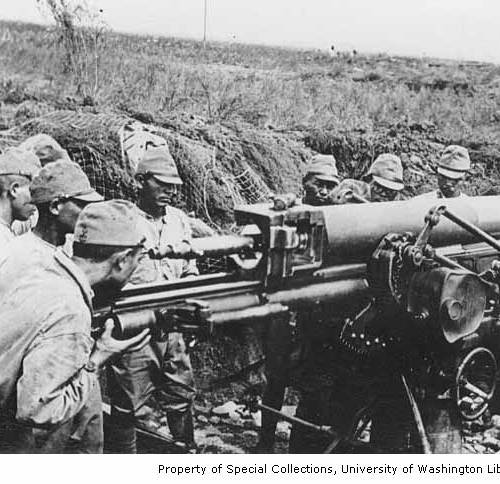
Coastal artillery battery on Attu in 1943.

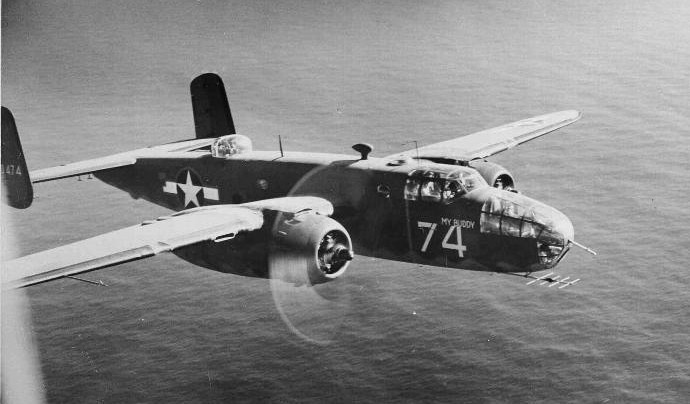
A B-25 Mitchell from the 77th Bomb Squadron flying southeast of Attu in 1943.

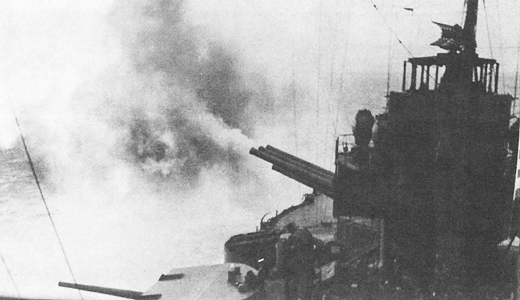
The battleship Pennsylvania bombards Attu during landing operations on 11 May 1943.

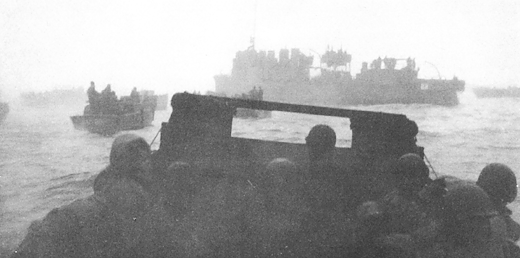
The destroyer Pruitt guides landing craft toward the beach at Massacre Bay, Attu.

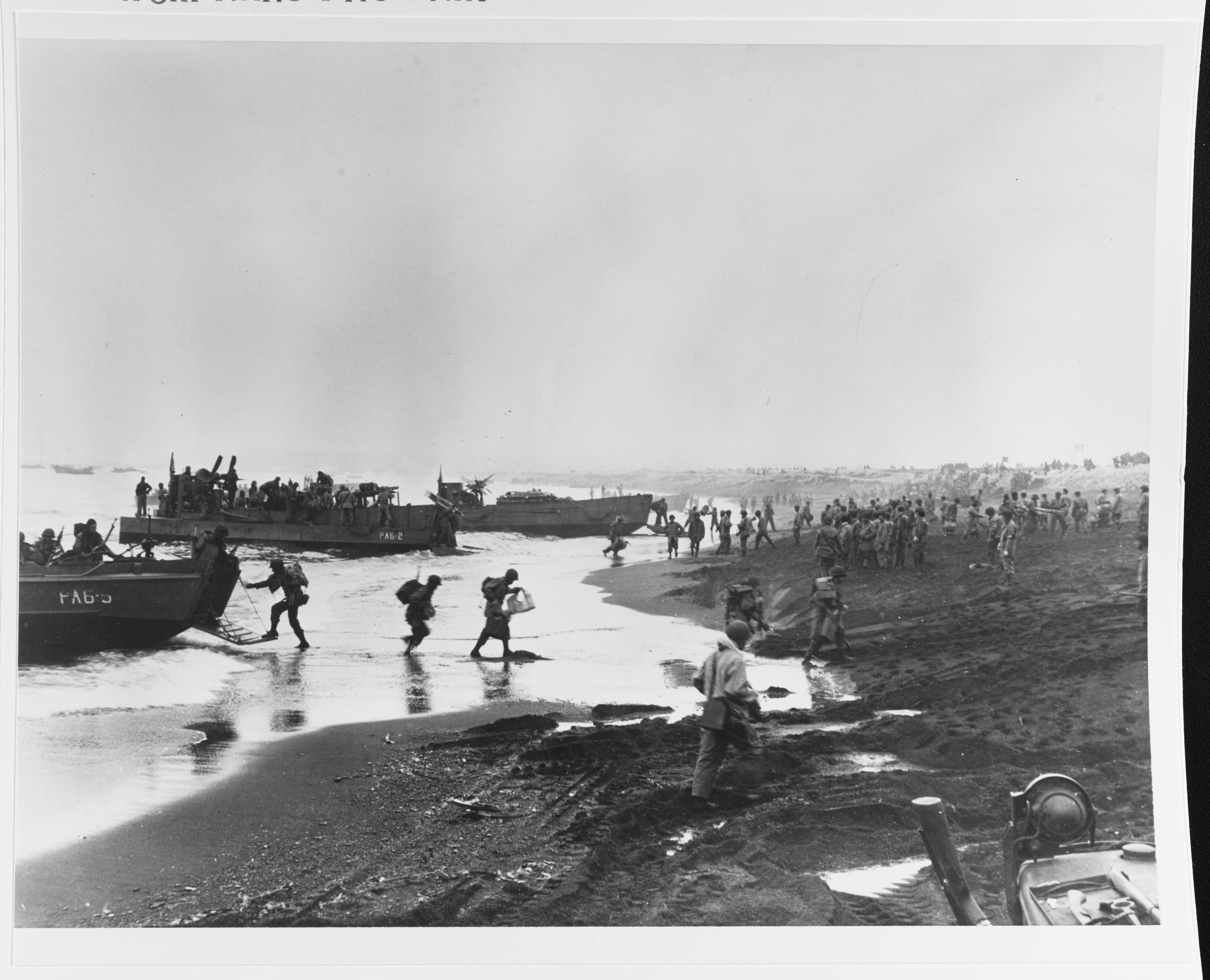
Soldiers unloading landing craft on the beach at Massacre Bay, Attu, on 12 May 1943.

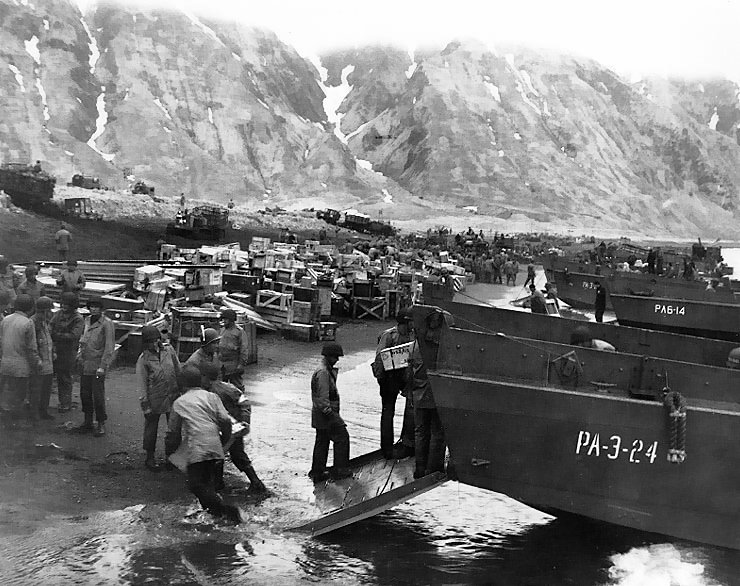
More equipment and combat supplies are brought ashore at Massacre Bay on 13 May 1943.

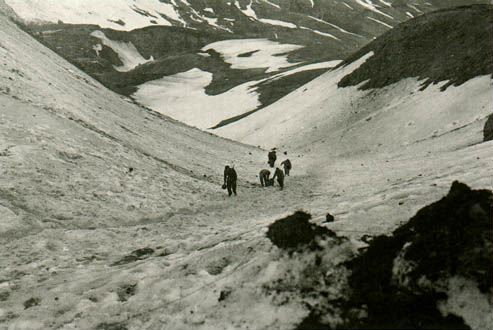
United States troops hauling supplies toward Chichagof Harbor.

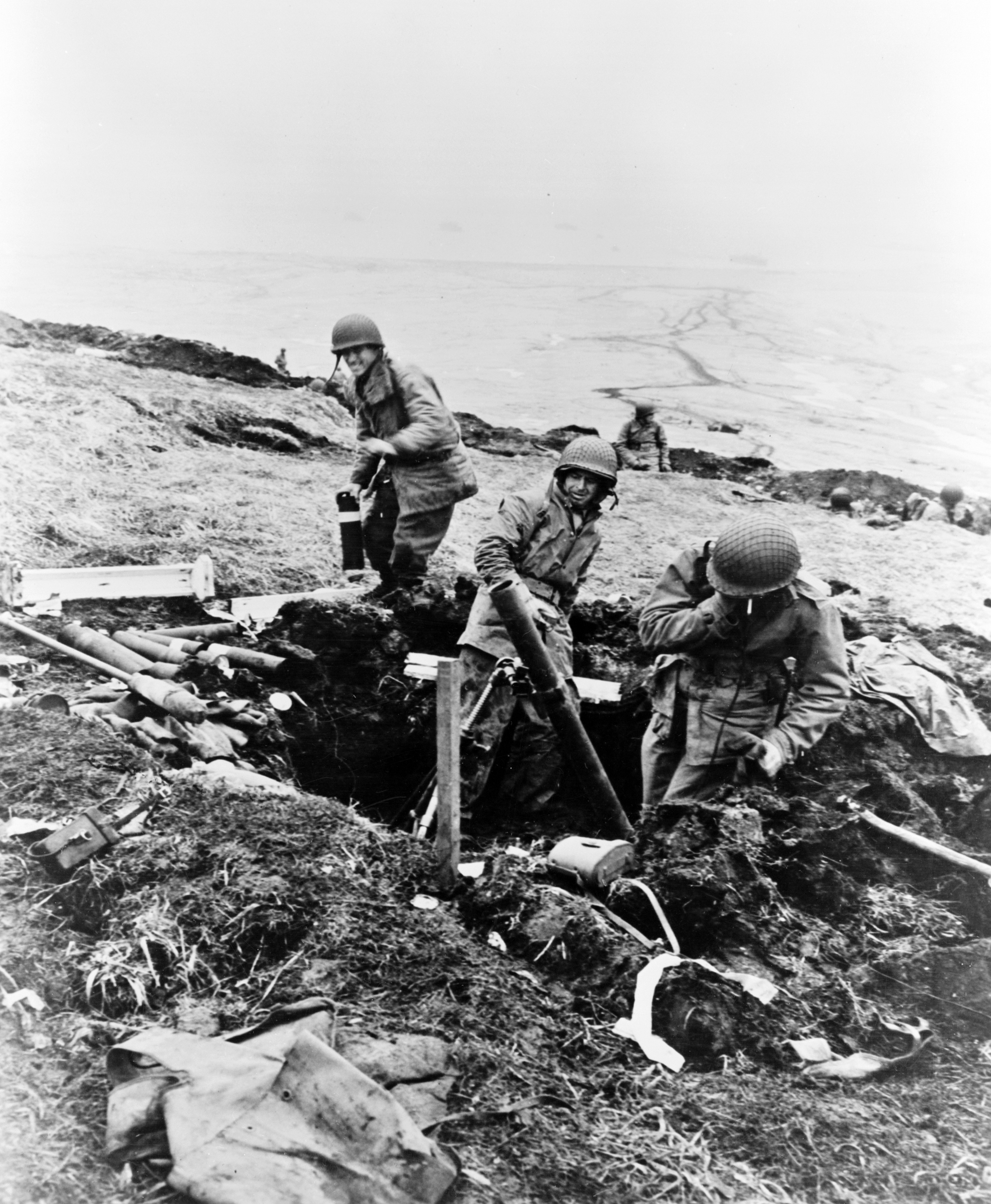
An American mortar team fire shells over a ridge onto Japanese positions during the battle.

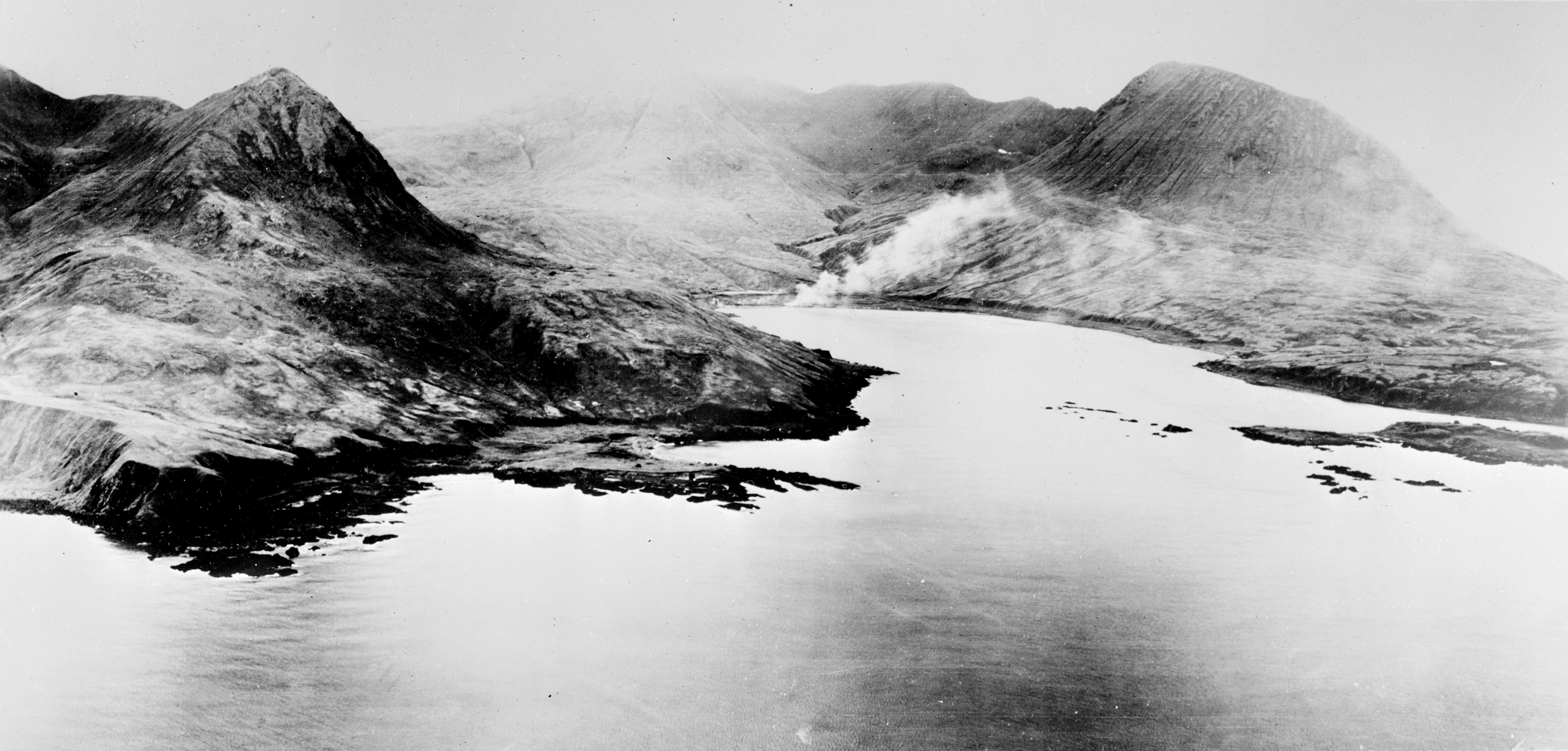
Smoke rising from American attacks on Chichagof Harbor.

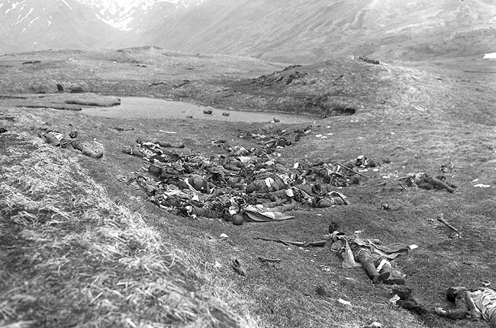
Japanese troops lie where they fell during the final banzai charge at Chichagof Harbor on 29 May 1943.

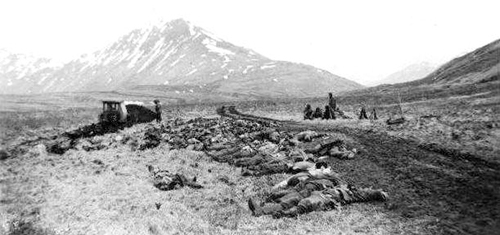
Dead Japanese soldiers are prepared for mass burial by U.S. forces.

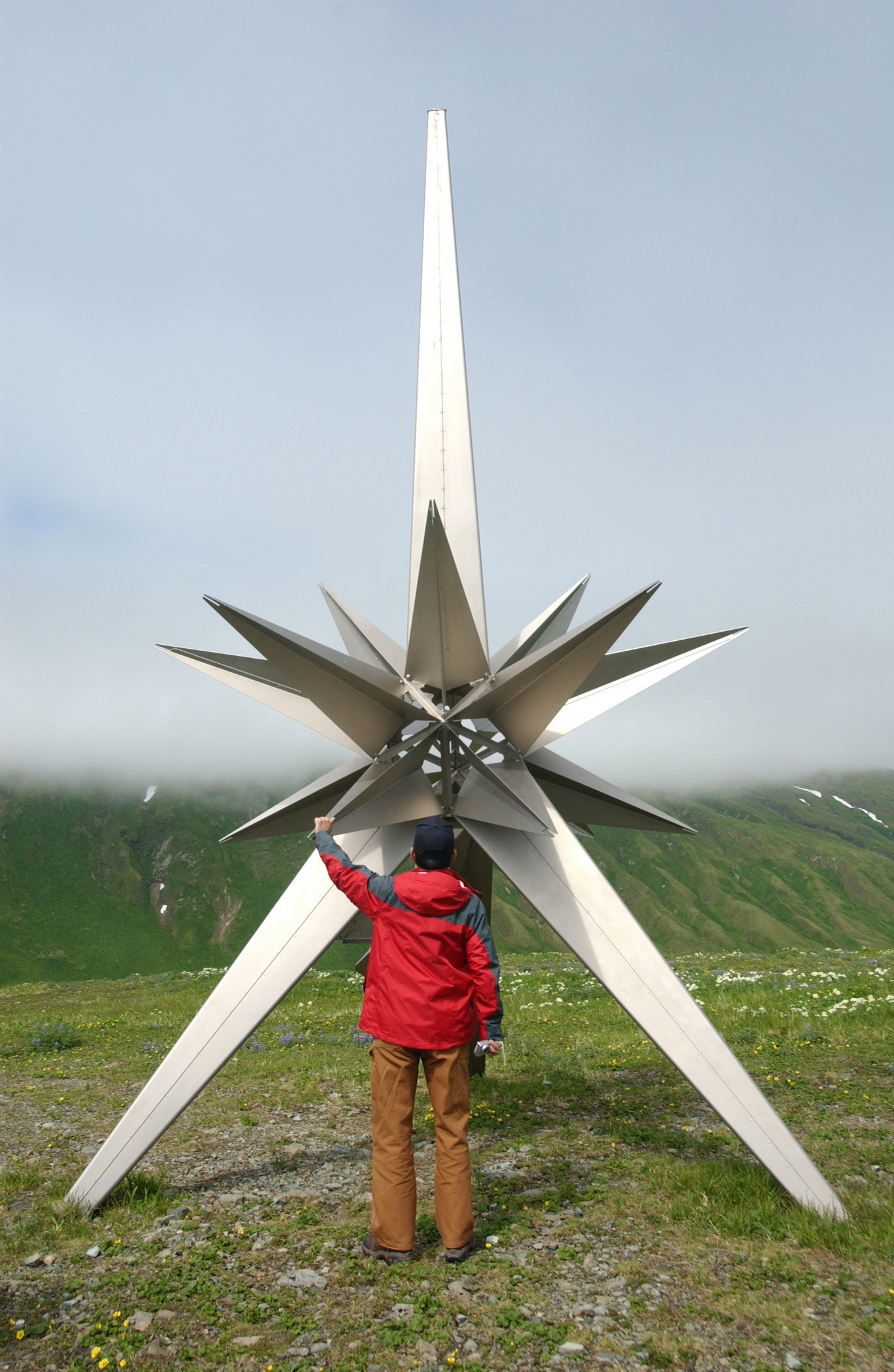
The Japanese Peace Monument on Attu Island, July 2007.

== See also ==
- Aleutian Islands World War II National Monument
- Castner's Cutthroats, a specially-selected 65-man unit which performed reconnaissance missions in the Aleutian Islands during the Pacific War
- Japanese Occupation Site
- Joe P. Martínez, a posthumous Medal of Honor recipient for actions during the Battle of Attu
- Paul Nobuo Tatsuguchi, a Japanese Seventh Day Adventist who served as military surgeon on Attu and died during the fighting
