= Yasuyo Yamasaki =

Japanese Army officer

- 山崎 保代
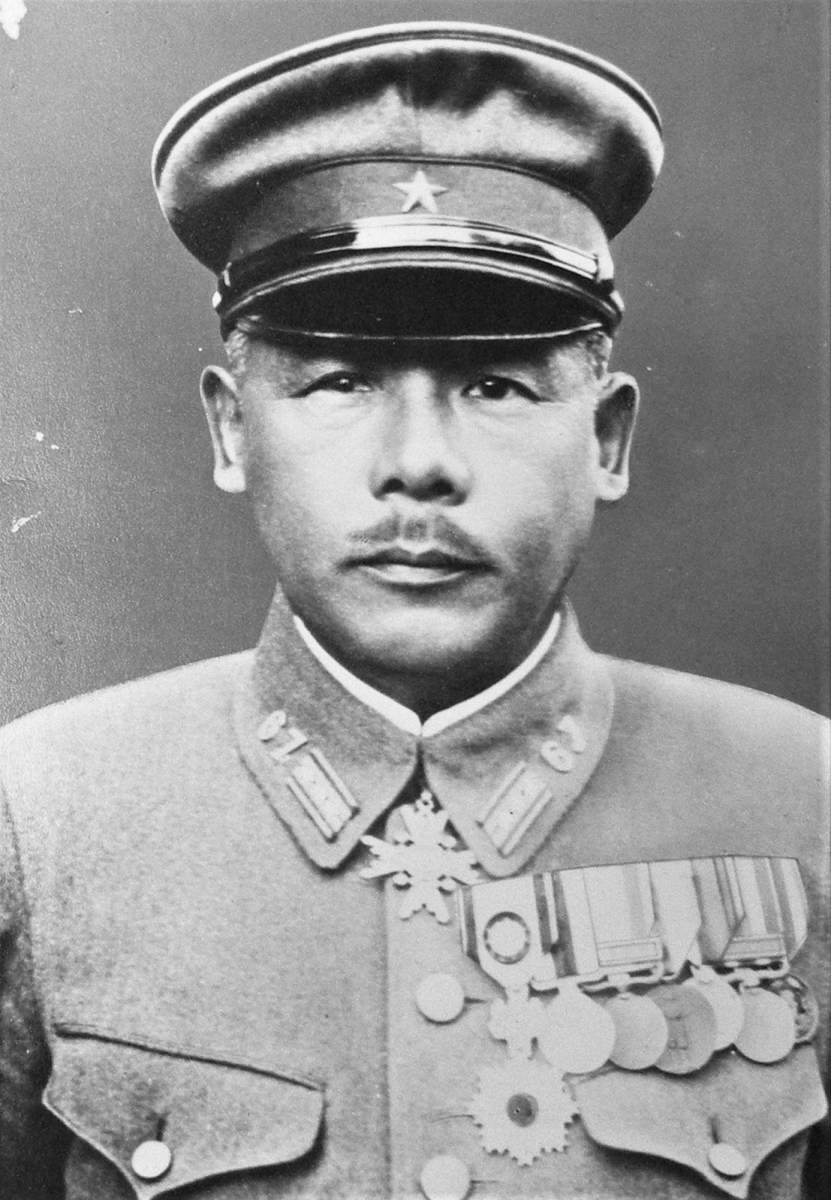
- Born: October 17, 1891; Tsuru, Yamanashi, Empire of Japan
- Died: May 29, 1943 (aged 51); Attu Island, Territory of Alaska, United States
- Military career
- Allegiance: Empire of Japan
- Branch: Imperial Japanese Army
- Service years: 1913–1943
- Rank: Lieutenant General (posthumous)
- Conflicts: Siberian Intervention; Jinan Incident; World War II; Battle of Attu †
- Awards: Order of the Rising Sun

Colonel Yasuyo Yamasaki (Japanese: 山崎 保代; often spelled as Yamazaki; October 17, 1891 – May 29, 1943) was a Japanese Army officer who commanded the Japanese forces on Attu during the Battle of Attu in World War II.

Yamasaki was a native of what is now part of Tsuru, Yamanashi, where his father was a Buddhist priest. He graduated from the 25th class of the Imperial Japanese Army Academy in 1913 and served in the Siberian Intervention from April 1918 to December 1920. In May 1928, he was part of the Japanese expeditionary force to mainland China during the Jinan Incident.

Yamasaki was promoted to colonel in March 1940. Later that year, he assumed command of the 130th Infantry Regiment.

In February 1943, Yamasaki became commanding officer of the 2nd District Force of the North Sea Defense Force, a position in which he went to the Aleutians. He arrived on Attu in April 1943 by submarine. His orders were to hold the island without outside help.

The 2,650 defenders under Yamasaki did not contest the American landings on Attu, but rather dug in on high ground away from the shore. The battle produced some of the bloodiest fighting in the American Theater and the Pacific Theater, similar to the battles of Iwo Jima and Okinawa.

On May 29, the last of the Japanese forces suddenly attacked near Chichagof Harbor in the first and only instance of a banzai charge on American soil. The charge was led by Yamasaki himself, who was killed later that day, sword in hand, and assaulting Engineer Hill. His attack penetrated American lines far enough to encounter shocked rear-echelon units of the American force. After furious, brutal, close-quarter, and often hand-to-hand combat, the entire Japanese force was killed almost to the last man: only 29 prisoners were taken, with none of them officers. American burial teams counted 2,351 Japanese dead, but it was presumed that hundreds more had been buried by bombardments over the course of the battle.

Military offices
Preceded by Kakuji Kakuta	Administrator of Occupied Aleutian Islands and Commander of North Sea Garrison; 1943	Succeeded by Kiichiro Higuchi
