= Attu Island =

Uninhabited island in Alaska

Attu
Native name: Atan
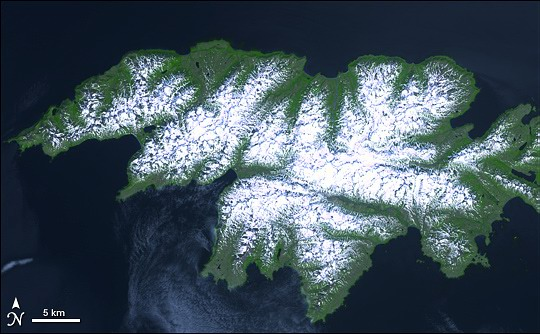
- Attu Island

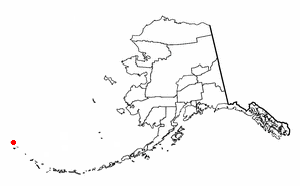

Geography
- Coordinates: 52°54′09″N 172°54′34″E
- Archipelago: Near Islands group of the Aleutian Islands
- Area: 344.7 sq mi (893 km^{2})
- Length: 35 mi (56 km)
- Width: 20 mi (30 km)
- Highest elevation: 2,946 ft (897.9 m)
- Highest point: Attu Mountain

Administration
- United States
- State: Alaska
- Census Area: Aleutians West Census Area

Demographics
- Population: 0 (2011)

Attu (Aleut: Atan, Russian: Атту) is an island in the Near Islands (part of the Aleutian Islands chain). It is one of the westernmost points of the U.S. state of Alaska. The island became uninhabited in 2010, making it the largest uninhabited island that is part of the United States.

In the chain of the Aleutians, the islands immediately to the west of Attu are the Russian Commander Islands, 208 miles (181 nmi; 335 km) away (and on the other side of the International Date Line). Attu is nearly 1,100 miles (960 nmi; 1,800 km) from the Alaskan mainland and 750 miles (650 nmi; 1,210 km) northeast of the northernmost of the Kuril Islands of Russia, as well as being 1,500 miles (1,300 nmi; 2,400 km) from Anchorage, 2,000 miles (1,700 nmi; 3,200 km) from Alaska's capital of Juneau, and 4,845 miles (4,210 nmi; 7,797 km) from New York City. Attu is about 20 by 35 miles (32 by 56 km) in size with a land area of 344.7 square miles (893 km^{2}), making it the 23rd largest island in the United States.

Attu Station, a former Coast Guard LORAN station, is located at 52°51′N 173°11′E, making it one of the westernmost points of the United States relative to the rest of the country. (Technically it is in the Eastern Hemisphere, being on the opposite side of the 180° longitude line from the contiguous 48 states, and thus can also be considered one of the easternmost points of the country; a second Aleutian Island, Semisopochnoi Island at 179°46′E, is the easternmost location in the United States by this definition. For purposes of calendar date, the International Date Line, however, passes to the west of Attu Island, making it the westernmost place in the United States with the same date.)

Although Attu Island is the westernmost body of land east of the International Date Line, its time zone is the same as other western Aleutian Islands, UTC−10, which means that locations to the south-southeast (such as the uninhabited Baker Island and Howland Island in UTC−12 and Niue, Midway Atoll and American Samoa in UTC −11) have earlier clocks.

The population in the 2010 census was 20 people, all at the Attu Station, though all inhabitants left the island later that year when the station closed. It then became the largest uninhabited island in the United States.

The Battle of Attu was the only World War II land battle fought in territory that is now part of a U.S. state. The battlefield site is a U.S. National Historic Landmark. In 1982, the only significant trees on the island were those planted by American soldiers at a chapel constructed after the 1943 battle when the Japanese occupation was over; they have since gone.

== History ==
The name Attu is the Unangan language (Aleut) name for the island. Research of the large number of archaeological sites on the island suggests an estimated precontact population ranging from 2,000 to 5,000 Unangan (Aleut).

Attu, being the nearest of the Aleutian Islands to Kamchatka, was the first of the islands exploited by Russian traders. Russian explorer Aleksei Chirikov called the island Saint Theodore in 1742. Russians stayed on the island several years at a stretch to hunt sea otters. The Russians often clashed with the local Unangan people. After the initial wave of traders, European ships largely overlooked Attu.

=== World War II ===
- Attu Battlefield and U.S. Army and Navy Airfields on Attu
- U.S. National Register of Historic Places
- U.S. National Historic Landmark
- Location within Alaska
- Location: Eastern part of Attu Island
- Coordinates: 52°53′26″N 173°04′29″E
- Area: 7,000 acres (2,800 ha)
- Built: 1942
- NRHP reference No.: 85002729

Significant dates
- Added to NRHP: February 4, 1985
- Designated NHL: February 4, 1985

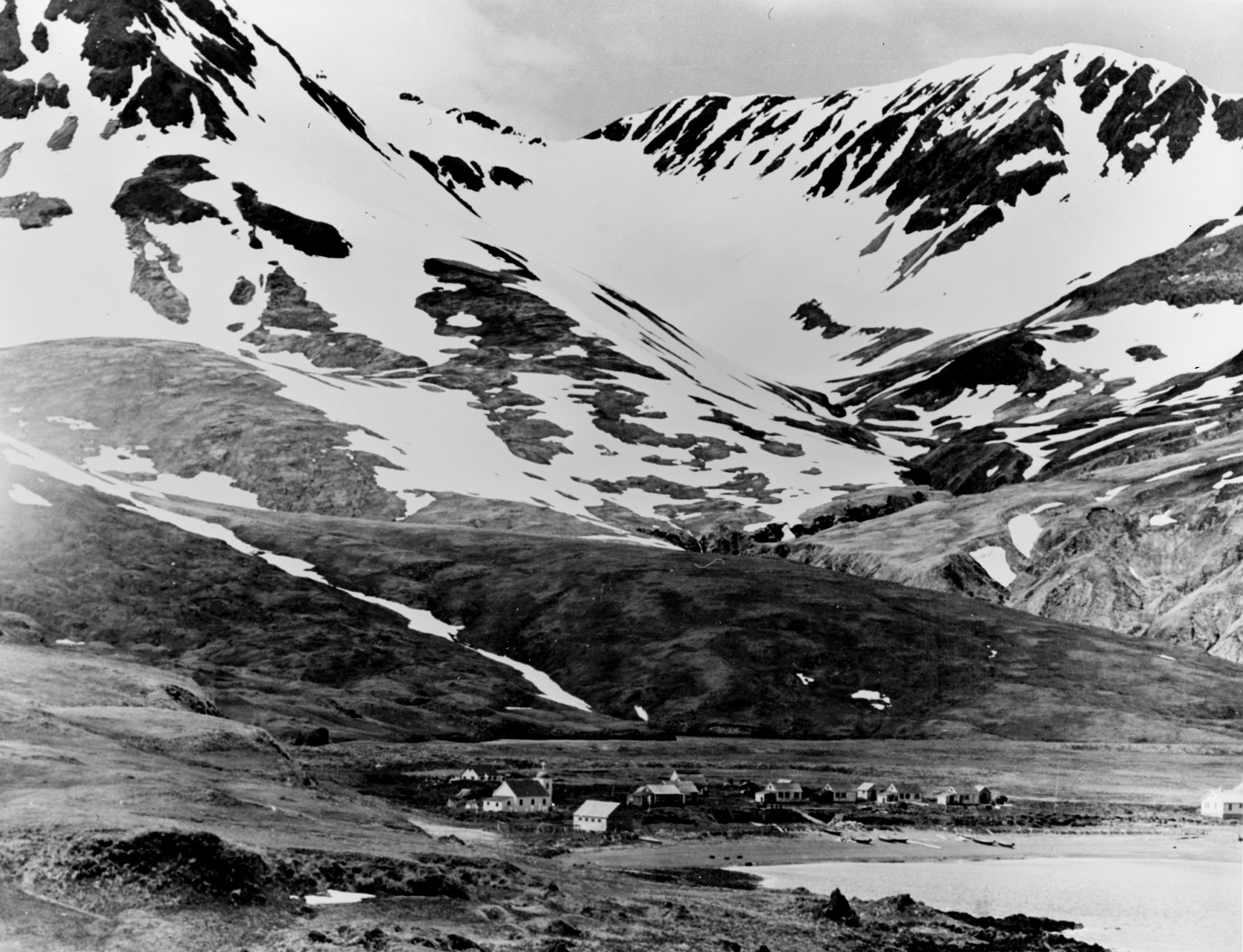
Attu village in June 1937

The Aleuts were the primary inhabitants of the island prior to World War II. On June 7, 1942, six months after the Japanese attack on Pearl Harbor, the 301st Independent Infantry Battalion of the Japanese Northern Army landed on the island without opposition, one day after landing on nearby Kiska to the east, which made Attu the second of the only two invasion sites on territory belonging to the United States soil during the war.

American authorities had previously evacuated about 880 Aleuts from villages elsewhere in the Aleutian Islands to the Alaska Panhandle, where about 75 of them died of various infectious diseases over two years. Attu Village had not yet been evacuated when the Japanese invaded. At the time, the population consisted of 45 native Aleuts and two white Americans, Charles Foster Jones (1879–1942), a radio technician, originally from St. Paris, Ohio, and his wife Etta (1879–1965), a schoolteacher, originally from Vineland, New Jersey. The village consisted of several houses around Chichagof Harbor. The 41 Attu inhabitants who survived the Japanese invasion were taken to a prison camp near Otaru, Hokkaidō. Twenty-two of them died while they were imprisoned. Mr. Jones, 63, was killed by the Japanese forces almost immediately after the invasion. Mrs. Jones, 63, was subsequently taken to the Bund Hotel in Yokohama, Japan, which also housed Australian prisoners of war from the 1942 Battle of Rabaul in Papua New Guinea. Later, Mrs. Jones and the Australian prisoners were held at the Yokohama Yacht Club from 1942 to 1944, and then at the Totsuka prisoner of war camp until their release in August 1945. Mrs. Jones died in December 1965 at age 86 in Bradenton, Florida.

Before the Attu villagers were returned to the U.S., the American government stated publicly that it was not aware of their status.

According to Gen. Kiichiro Higuchi, the Commander of the Japanese Northern Army, the invasion of Kiska and Attu was part of a threefold objective:

- To break up any offensives against Japan by way of the Aleutians.
- To place a barrier between the U.S. and Russia in case Russia decided to join the war against Japan.
- To make preparation for air bases for future offensive action.

In late September 1942, the Japanese garrison on Attu was transferred to Kiska, essentially leaving Attu unoccupied, but American forces made no attempt to reoccupy it at the time. On October 29, 1942, the Japanese reestablished a base on Attu at Holtz Bay under the command of Lt. Col. Hiroshi Yanekawa. Initially, the garrison was about 500 troops, but through reinforcements, that number reached about 2,300 by March 10, 1943. No more reinforcements arrived after that time, owing mainly to the efforts of the U.S. naval force under Rear Admiral Charles "Soc" McMorris, and United States Navy submarines. McMorris had been assigned to interdict the Japanese supply and reinforcement convoys. After the sizable naval Battle of the Komandorski Islands, the Japanese abandoned their attempts to resupply its Aleutian garrisons by surface ships. From then on, only submarines were used for the resupply runs.

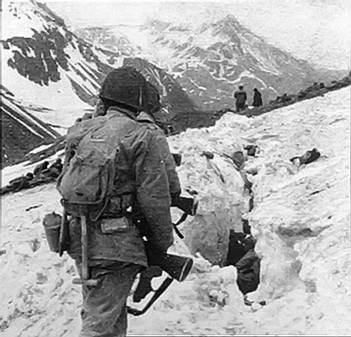
U.S. troops navigate snow and ice during the Battle of Attu in May 1943

On May 11, 1943, the American operation to recapture Attu began. A shortage of landing craft, unsuitable beaches, and equipment that failed to operate in the harsh weather caused great difficulties in projecting any force against the Japanese. Many soldiers suffered from frostbite because essential supplies could not be landed, or having been landed, could not be moved to where they were needed. Army vehicles would not work on the tundra. The Japanese defenders under Colonel Yasuyo Yamasaki did not contest the landings, but dug in on high ground away from the shore. This led to bloody fighting: there were 3,929 U.S. casualties: 549 were killed, 1,148 were injured, 1,200 had severe cold injuries, 614 succumbed to infectious diseases, and 318 died of miscellaneous causes – largely from Japanese booby traps and from friendly fire. The Japanese were defeated in Massacre Valley. The death count for the Japanese was 2,035. The Americans then built "Navy Town" near Massacre Bay.

On May 29, the last of the Japanese forces suddenly attacked near Massacre Bay in one of the largest banzai charges of the Pacific campaign. The charge, led by Colonel Yamasaki, penetrated U.S. lines far enough to encounter shocked rear-echelon units of the American force. After furious, brutal, close-quarter, and often hand-to-hand combat, the Japanese force was killed almost to the last man: only 28 prisoners were taken, none of them officers. U.S. burial teams counted 2,351 Japanese dead, but it was presumed that hundreds more had been buried by naval, air, and artillery bombardments over the course of the battle.

The Japanese Navy, realizing that their position was now untenable, evacuated Kiska three months later.

The United States Army Air Forces (USAAF) built a larger airfield, the Alexai Point Army Airfield, and then used it on July 10, 1943, as the base for an air attack on the Japanese-held Kurile Islands, now part of Russia. This was the first air attack on the Japanese "homelands" since the famous Doolittle Raid in 1942. Other attacks followed.

On April 11, 1945, in a period of only two hours, at least nine Japanese incendiary balloons sent to start forest fires in the United States West Coast were intercepted and shot down near Attu by USAAF P-38 Lightning aircraft.

=== Postwar ===
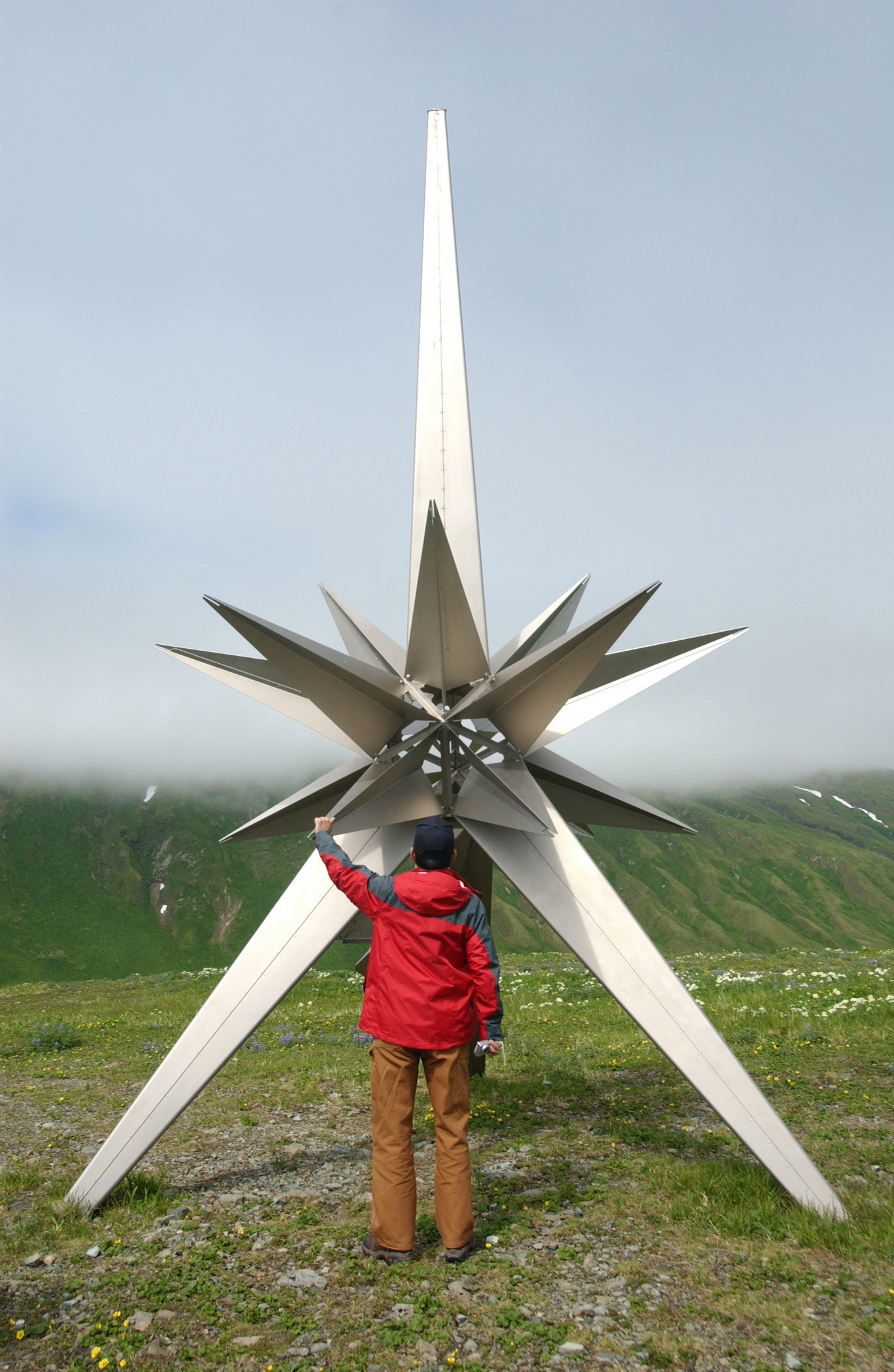
The Second World War peace memorial on Attu Island

After the war, the survivors of the Otaru prison camp were shipped to other Aleutian islands or to the mainland of Alaska. The US government did not allow them to return, despite their intense desire to do so. The United States government decided to construct a LORAN station on the southern tip of Attu, at Theodore Point. This installation was staffed by about twenty members of the United States Coast Guard. The equipment to build the station came out of Holtz Bay and was ferried on barges and landing craft to Baxter Cove, about one mile east of the station. Bulldozers were used to cut a road from Baxter Cove to Theodore Point.

In 1954, the station was moved to Casco Cove, near the former Navy Base at Massacre Bay. In 1960, it was moved to Massacre Bay.

The island previously had scheduled airline service to and from Anchorage (ANC) flown by Reeve Aleutian Airways (RAA) which in 1976 was operating two direct flights a week between ANC and Attu with Lockheed L-188 Electra turboprop aircraft via an en route stop either at Adak Airport or Shemya island in the Aleutian Islands. At the time, the airport on Attu was the westernmost airfield located in the U.S. to have scheduled passenger airline service.

In 1984, the "392" exchange in the 907 area code, which includes Attu (and whose rate center is on nearby Shemya Island), became the last telephone exchange in the United States to be upgraded to dial service. Prior to that, all telephone calls to and from that exchange could only be placed with the assistance of an operator.

The battlefield area and subsequent military sites were declared a National Historic Landmark in 1985. The battlefield is now part of Aleutian Islands World War II National Monument.

In 1987, with the approval of the U.S. Department of the Interior, the government of Japan placed a monument on Engineer Hill, site of the hand-to-hand finale of the battle against the Japanese. An inscription, in Japanese and English, reads: "In memory of all those who sacrificed their lives in the islands and seas of the North Pacific during World War II and in dedication to world peace."

In July 2007, the boots and foot bones of a Japanese soldier were found on the island, and on May 23, 2008, the remains of two more Japanese soldiers were discovered by U.S. Coast Guard Petty Officer 3rd Class Richard Brahm, a public affairs specialist who was a documentarian for the remains recovery team. More remains were located at the burial site, but were left untouched with plans to return at a later time and have them exhumed properly.

On August 1, 2010, the United States Coast Guard LORAN station on Attu permanently ceased operation. On August 27, 2010, the station was decommissioned and the Coast Guard personnel left, leaving the island with no resident population.

On June 7, 2012, the 70th anniversary of the Japanese invasion, Senator Lisa Murkowski and United States Coast Guard Rear Admiral Thomas Ostebo travelled to Attu and dedicated a memorial to Attu Village, its residents who died in Japanese captivity, and the survivors who were unable to return.

In 2015, Attu Island was visited by pilot and world circumnavigator Michael Smith. The island was a crucial refueling stop for Smith as he made his way from Adak island in the Aleutian Islands to Japan. As the island is uninhabited, he had to first fly containers of fuel there and then return as part of the journey from Adak to Japan. He was advised against staying overnight as there are large rats on the island.

After three months of efforts in digging up and removing contaminated soil from the island in the summer of 2016 via funding from the Formerly Used Defense Sites program, it was expected that further efforts would be required to finish the environmental clean up of the island.

In 2017, a 7.8 magnitude earthquake had its epicenter west of Attu.

In 2022, the island was visited by Mack Rutherford who made an emergency landing during a flight from Japan to Alaska. After staying overnight he was able to safely continue his journey the next day.

== Demographics ==
Historical population
Census	Pop.	Note	%±
1880	107		—
1890	101		−5.6%
1930	29		—
1940	44		51.7%
1980	29		—
2000	20		—
2010	21		5.0%
2017 (est.)	0		−100.0%
U.S. Decennial Census

Attu first appeared on the 1880 U.S. Census as the unincorporated Aleut village of "Attoo", which at the time consisted of the village on western Chichagof Harbor. It had 107 residents, consisting of 74 Aleuts, 32 "Creoles" (mixed Russian and Native) and 1 White resident. In 1890, it appeared as Attu. It did not return again on the census until 1930. It appeared on the 1940 census, two years before the Japanese invasion of the village and island. It did not return again until 1980, when it consisted of the naval station residents at Massacre Bay, and was made a census-designated place (CDP). It did not return on the 1990 census. The name was changed to Attu Naval Station and redesignated a CDP in 2000. It last appeared on the 2010 census, just before the closure of the station in August that year and the departure of its remaining residents.

== Climate ==
According to the Köppen climate classification system, Attu has a subpolar oceanic climate (Cfc; Dfc if the 0 °C isotherm is used) closely bordering on a tundra climate (ET). The weather on Attu is typically cloudy, rainy, and foggy. High winds occur occasionally. Five or six days a week are likely to be rainy, and there are only about eight to ten clear days a year. The rest of the time, even if rain is not falling, fog of varying density is the rule rather than the exception. There are 39–49 inches (990–1,240 mm) of annual rainfall and other precipitation, with the heaviest rains in the autumn and early winter. Due to the strong oceanic influence, Attu's climate is exceptionally mild for its latitude, with summers much cooler and winters much warmer than more continental locations.

Climate data for Attu (1961–1990 normals, extremes 1917–1993)
Month	Jan	Feb	Mar	Apr	May	Jun	Jul	Aug	Sep	Oct	Nov	Dec	Year
Record high °F (°C)	49 (9)	51 (11)	51 (11)	53 (12)	59 (15)	64 (18)	77 (25)	77 (25)	68 (20)	61 (16)	54 (12)	49 (9)	77 (25)
Mean maximum °F (°C)	40.1 (4.5)	40.0 (4.4)	41.5 (5.3)	44.6 (7.0)	50.1 (10.1)	56.9 (13.8)	62.3 (16.8)	63.3 (17.4)	59.7 (15.4)	54.1 (12.3)	46.5 (8.1)	41.1 (5.1)	65.5 (18.6)
Mean daily maximum °F (°C)	34.7 (1.5)	33.9 (1.1)	36.1 (2.3)	39.1 (3.9)	43.3 (6.3)	48.5 (9.2)	53.1 (11.7)	55.3 (12.9)	52.9 (11.6)	47.2 (8.4)	40.0 (4.4)	35.6 (2.0)	43.3 (6.3)
Daily mean °F (°C)	30.7 (−0.7)	30.0 (−1.1)	32.2 (0.1)	35.4 (1.9)	39.3 (4.1)	44.2 (6.8)	48.8 (9.3)	50.8 (10.4)	48.4 (9.1)	42.2 (5.7)	35.5 (1.9)	31.7 (−0.2)	39.1 (3.9)
Mean daily minimum °F (°C)	26.7 (−2.9)	26.1 (−3.3)	28.2 (−2.1)	31.6 (−0.2)	35.2 (1.8)	39.9 (4.4)	44.4 (6.9)	46.2 (7.9)	43.9 (6.6)	37.2 (2.9)	30.9 (−0.6)	27.7 (−2.4)	34.8 (1.6)
Mean minimum °F (°C)	17.4 (−8.1)	17.6 (−8.0)	18.9 (−7.3)	23.1 (−4.9)	28.9 (−1.7)	34.7 (1.5)	39.2 (4.0)	39.0 (3.9)	36.5 (2.5)	30.1 (−1.1)	22.3 (−5.4)	17.3 (−8.2)	13.0 (−10.6)
Record low °F (°C)	5 (−15)	7 (−14)	4 (−16)	12 (−11)	15 (−9)	23 (−5)	27 (−3)	28 (−2)	20 (−7)	19 (−7)	12 (−11)	2 (−17)	2 (−17)
Average precipitation inches (mm)	3.64 (92)	3.30 (84)	3.06 (78)	3.09 (78)	2.50 (64)	2.59 (66)	4.00 (102)	5.47 (139)	5.80 (147)	5.30 (135)	4.37 (111)	4.16 (106)	47.28 (1,201)
Average snowfall inches (cm)	15.8 (40)	17.5 (44)	11.5 (29)	3.7 (9.4)	0.6 (1.5)	0.0 (0.0)	0.0 (0.0)	0.0 (0.0)	0.0 (0.0)	0.7 (1.8)	8.7 (22)	13.1 (33)	71.6 (182)
Average extreme snow depth inches (cm)	12.8 (33)	15.4 (39)	16.8 (43)	8.3 (21)	1.8 (4.6)	0.0 (0.0)	0.0 (0.0)	0.0 (0.0)	0.0 (0.0)	0.2 (0.51)	3.8 (9.7)	6.2 (16)	22.8 (58)
Average precipitation days (≥ 0.01 inch)	16.4	15.4	16.2	13.4	11.1	9.7	11.6	14.3	15.7	18.4	16.7	15.1	174.0
Average snowy days (≥ 0.1 in)	10.3	13.0	8.8	3.1	0.3	0.0	0.0	0.0	0.0	0.6	5.7	8.0	49.8
Source 1: Western Regional Climate Center (average temperature and precipitation)
Source 2: XMACIS (snowfall and extreme snow depth 1961–1990)

== Birding ==
Attu was an important location in the world of competitive birding, whose goal is to see or hear the largest possible number of bird species within a specific geographic area during a specific time period. Because it is so physically remote from other parts of North America, there are a number of bird species likely to be found on Attu that are not seen anywhere else on the continent. John Fitchen called the island "the Holy Grail of North American birding".

During his record-setting big year of 1998, in which he identified a record 745 species (later revised to 748), Sandy Komito spent 29 days (May 10 – June 7) on the island. Since the closure of Attu Station by the U.S. Coast Guard in 2010, access by birders has been greatly restricted. Birding tours can still reach Attu, but only by a multi-day boat trip from Adak Island. In a 2010 interview on the subject, Al Levantin (one of Komito's competitors in the 1998 season) singled out inaccessibility of Attu as the factor that would make it nearly impossible to break Komito's record. However, Neil Hayward did break the record, by one species, in 2013 without visiting Attu.

== Education ==
Prior to World War II, the Bureau of Indian Affairs (BIA) operated the sole school on the island. When the Japanese captured Attu, the school had a single teacher who was a White American woman. A force consisting of 1,140 infantry under Major Matsutoshi Hosumi took control of the island and captured Attu's population, which consisted of 45 Aleuts and two white Americans, Charles Foster Jones (1879–1942), an amateur radio operator and weather reporter, originally from St. Paris, Ohio, and his wife Etta (1879–1965), a teacher and nurse, originally from Vineland, New Jersey. Charles Jones was killed by the Japanese forces immediately after the invasion because he refused to fix the radio he destroyed to prevent the occupying troops from using it. His wife was subsequently taken to the Bund Hotel in Yokohama, Japan, and later transferred to the Yokohama Yacht Club and kept there until July 1944 when she was moved to the old Totsuka Hospital in Yokohama. The hospital served as an internment camp until the end of the war in August 1945. Etta Jones died in December 1965 at age 86 in Bradenton, Florida.

As of 2017, the uninhabited island is physically within the Aleutian Region School District.

== See also ==
- List of National Historic Landmarks in Alaska
- National Register of Historic Places listings in Aleutians West Census Area, Alaska
- Peaceful River (Alaska)
