= Chichagof Harbor =

- Chichagof Bay, Tschitschagoff Harbor
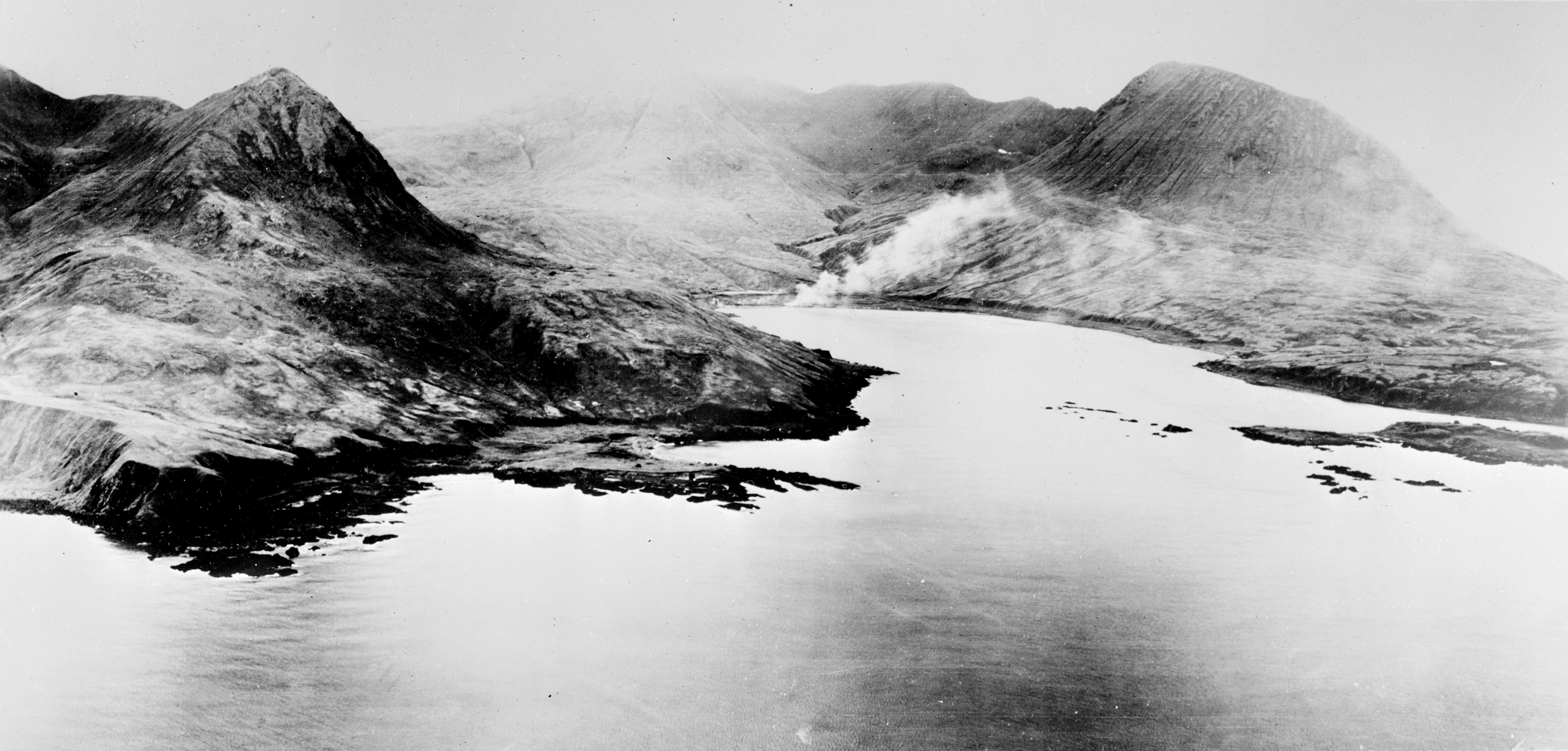
- Aerial photo of Chichagof harbor on Attu island, Alaska (USA), during the Battle of Attu, 11 to 30 May 1943.
- Interactive map of Chichagof Harbor
- Location: United States; Alaska; Attu Island
- Coordinates: 52°55′48″N 173°14′41″E
- Type: Bay
- Etymology: Vasily Chichagov
- Ocean/sea sources: Bering Sea
- Average depth: 2–4 fathoms (12–24 ft; 3.7–7.3 m)

Chichagof Harbor is an inlet on the northeast coast of the island of Attu in the Aleutian Islands in Alaska. It is named after Russian Admiral and polar explorer Vasily Chichagov. It was the location of an Aleut village served by an American pastor and his wife. It was also where some heavy fighting took place during the recapture of the island from the Japanese during the Battle of Attu in World War II and afterwards was the site of Battery B 42nd Coast Artillery Battalion.
