= List of ghost towns in Alaska =

This is an incomplete list of ghost towns in Alaska. Ghost towns can include sites in various states of disrepair and abandonment. Some sites no longer have any trace of civilization and have reverted to wilderness. Other sites are unpopulated but still have standing buildings. Some sites may even have a sizable, though small, population, but there are far fewer citizens than in their grander historic past.

== Classification ==
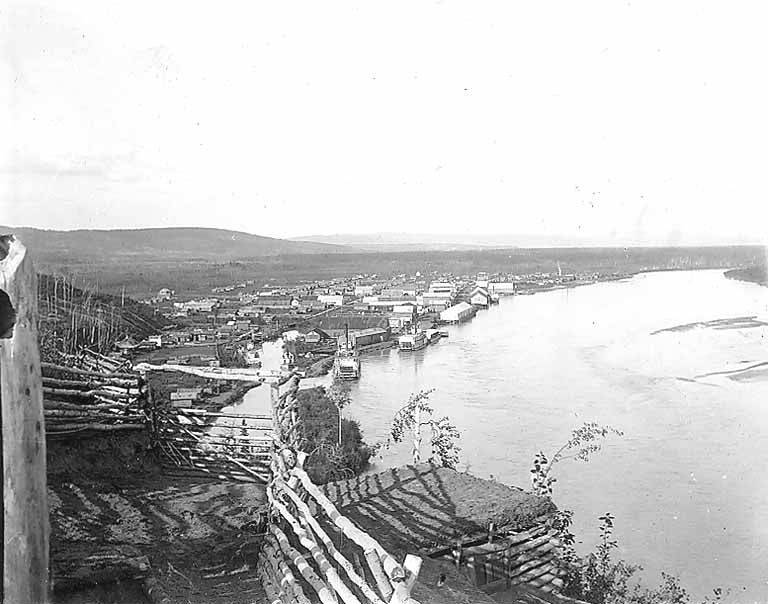
A 1907 photo of Chena, the remains of which are buried beneath a suburb of Fairbanks with nothing visible today

=== Barren site ===
- Sites no longer in existence
- Sites that have been destroyed
- Covered with water
- Reverted to pasture
- May have a few difficult to find foundations/footings at most

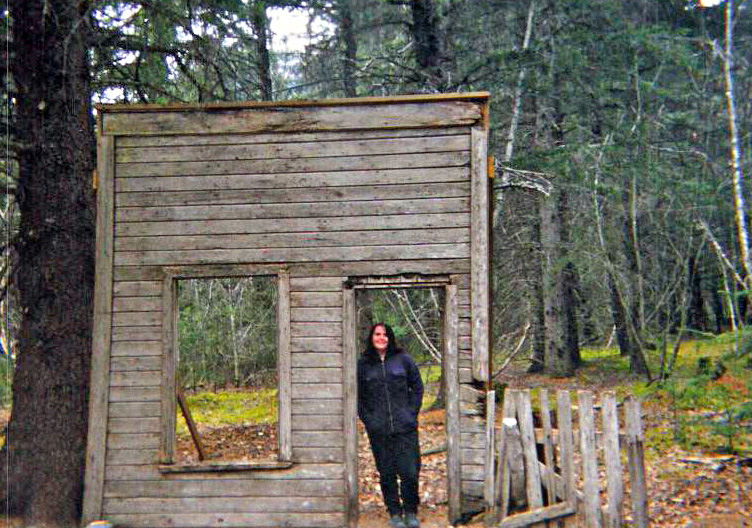
One of the few remaining structures in Dyea

=== Neglected site ===
- Only rubble left
- Roofless building ruins
- Buildings or houses still standing, but majority are roofless

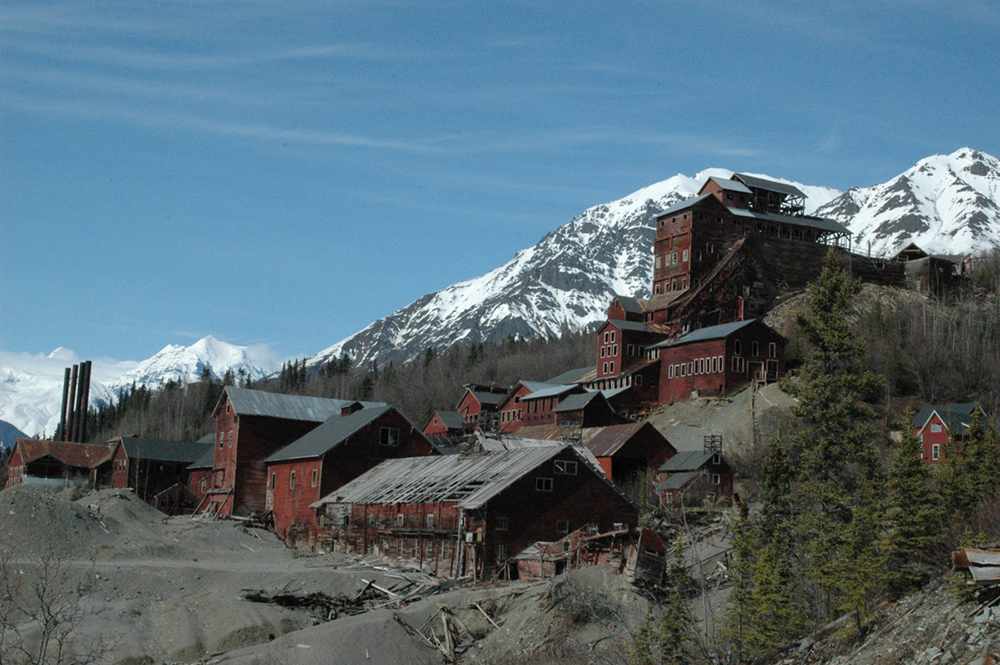
The historic copper mine complex at Kennecott. Tourists visit the many remaining buildings, but many caretakers live in nearby McCarthy.

=== Abandoned site ===
- Buildings or houses still standing
- Buildings and houses all abandoned
- No population, except caretaker
- Site no longer in existence except for one or two buildings, for example an old church or grocery store

=== Semi-abandoned site ===
- Buildings or houses still standing
- Buildings and houses largely abandoned
- Few residents
- Many abandoned buildings
- Small population

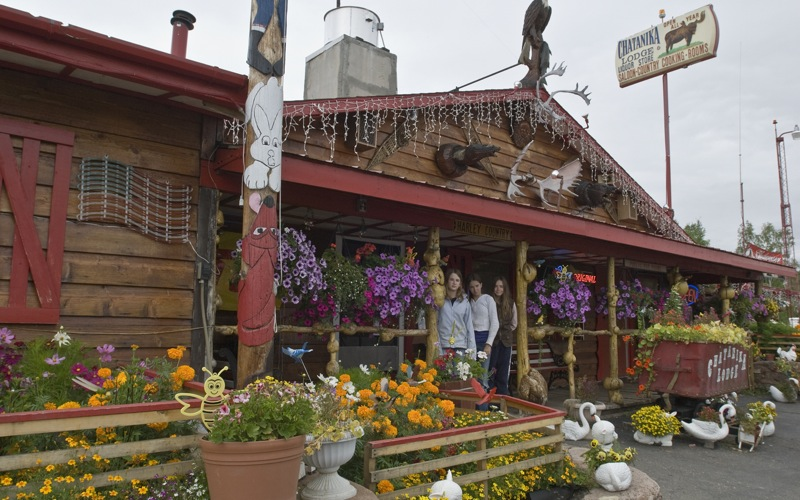
Chatanika is still inhabited, but has not appeared on the census since 1940.

=== Historic community ===
- Buildings or houses still standing
- Still a busy community
- Smaller than its boom years
- Population has decreased dramatically, to one fifth or less

== Table ==
| Name | Other names | Borough/census area | Location | Settled | Abandoned | Current status | Remarks |
|---|---|---|---|---|---|---|---|
| Afognak | | Kodiak Island Borough | | ~5,500 B.C.E. | March 27, 1964 | | A native Alutiiq village, first colonized by Russia in 1784, the community never recovered from the 1964 Good Friday earthquake. |
| Akulurak | | Kusilvak Census Area | 62 ° 33' 8" N, 164 ° 33' 10" W | | | | An Alaska Native village which has been largely abandoned due to runoff from a nearby mountain pass. |
| Amalga | | Juneau Borough | | 1902 | 1927 | | mining stopped for good at the Eagle River Mine, and the town of Amalga was abandoned. Many of the buildings were dismantled, and, along with some of the lighter pieces of equipment, hauled out on the seven-mile long horse tram. |
| Attu | | Aleutians West Census Area | | 1880 U.S. Census | | | Location of the only land battle to be fought in the United States during World War II. |
| Aurora | | Kenai Peninsula Borough | At Kachemak Bay near Homer | 1901 | | Barren | An elaborate failed hoax built by wealthy businessman Thomas C. Dunn. |
| Ayak | Ahyak, Ayaaq, Asaaq | Nome Census Area | Sledge Island | | c. 1918 | | Abandoned during the 1918 flu pandemic. |
| Belkofski | Selo Belkovskoe | Aleutians East Borough | 12 miles southeast of King Cove | 1823 | 1980s | Barren | Many of the villagers emigrated to King Cove and the village was completely abandoned about 1990. |
| Bettles | Old Bettles | Yukon-Koyukuk Census Area | | 1898 | 1997 | Neglected | Destroyed in The Palm Sunday Avalanche. |
| Big Port Walter | | | | | | | A former fishing community. |
| Biorka | | Aleutians West Census Area | Vicinity of Unalaska | 1900 | | Barren | A native Aleut village and former mining town. |
| Caniliaq | | | | | | | |
| Cape Fanshaw | | | | August 14, 1794 | 1937 | | |
| Caro | | | | 1907 (post office opened) | 1912 (post office closed) | Historic | |
| Chatanika | | Fairbanks North Star Borough | | 1904 | | Historic | A former gold rush boom town, the population of Chatanika is sparse. |
| Chena | | Fairbanks North Star Borough | | 1903 | | Barren | A boom town that was never properly surveyed, the exact location of Chena was lost until it was found buried beneath a suburb of Fairbanks. |
| Chenega | | Chugach Census Area | | | 1964 | | The old village was destroyed in a Tsunami caused by the Good Friday earthquake in 1964 and was resettled at a different location as Chenega Bay. |
| Chernofski | | Aleutians West Census Area | Vicinity of Unalaska | | 1928 | | A native Aleut village. |
| Chisana | | Copper River Census Area | | | | | |
| Chisna | | | | | | | |
| Chomly | | | | | | | |
| Chuloonawick | Chuloonavik, Kwikpakamiut, Kwikpak | Kusilvak Census Area | 62.947176413841156°N, 164.16838545847418°W | Before 1879 | After 1969 | Barren | Fishing camp; formerly inhabited by the Chuloonawick people of Emmonak. |
| Coldfoot | | | | | | | A mining boom town until the mines ran dry in 1912. |
| Copper City | | | | | | | |
| Coppermount | | | | | | | |
| Council | | Nome Census Area | | | | | |
| Curry | | Matanuska-Susitna Borough | | | | | |
| Dickson | | Nome Census Area | | | | | |
| Dunbar | | Yukon-Koyukuk Census Area | 64.759093, -148.787643 | | | Barren | A former railroad town. |
| Dyea | | Municipality of Skagway Borough | | | | Neglected | Known for containing "The Slide", a cemetery in which almost everyone interred died in the same avalanche on April 3, 1898. |
| Flat | Flat City | Yukon-Koyukuk Census Area | | `1909 | 2004 | | A gold rush town that never recovered from a large fire in 1924. |
| Fort Egbert | | Southeast Fairbanks Census Area | | | | | |
| Funter Bay | | | | | | | |
| Gilmore | | | | | | | |
| Hamilton | Nunapiggluugaq | | | | | | |
| Iditarod | | Yukon-Koyukuk Census Area | | | | | |
| Independence Mines | | Matanuska-Susitna Borough | | | | Historic | |
| Kaguyak | | | | | | | |
| Kalakaket | | | | | | | |
| Kashega | | Aleutians West Census Area | Vicinity of Unalaska | | | | A native Aleut village. |
| Katalla | | Chugach Census Area | | | 1943 | | |
| Katmai | | Kodiak Island Borough | | | 1912 | | Buried in ash by the 1912 eruption of Mount Katmai. |
| Kauwerak | | Nome Census Area | | | | | An Inupiat village abandoned when most of the residents left for Mary's Igloo. |
| Kennicott | | Copper River Census Area | 4.5 miles from McCarthy | | 1938 | Abandoned/historic | |
| Kern | | Kenai Peninsula Borough | | | | | |
| Kijik | Lake Clark Village, Nijik, Nikhkak, Nikhak, Old Keegik | Lake and Peninsula Borough | | | 1909 | | A native Athabascan village. |
| King Island | Ugiuvak | Nome Census Area | | | 1970 | Abandoned | Once home to a tribe of Inupiat people known as the Ugiuvaŋmiut, the Bureau of Indian Affairs closed the island's school in the mid 20th century, forcing the children to move to the mainland for school and leaving the adults and elders unable to maintain their lifestyle. |
| Knik | K'enakatnu, Old Knik Townsite | Matanuska-Susitna Borough | | | | | |
| Loring | | Ketchikan Gateway Borough | | | | Semi-abandoned | |
| Makushin | | Aleutians West Census Area | Vicinity of Unalaska | | | | A native Aleut village. |
| Mary's Igloo | Aukvaunlook | Nome Census Area | | | | | |
| Meehan | | | | | | | |
| Mumtrak | | Bethel Census Area | | | | | Repeat flooding caused the residents to abandon the site for Goodnews Bay. |
| Ohagamiut | | Bethel Census Area | | | | | |
| Old Minto | | | | | | | Old Minto was abandoned due to repeat flooding. |
| Olnes | | | | | | | |
| Ophir | | Yukon-Koyukuk Census Area | | | | | |
| Otter | | Yukon-Koyukuk Census Area | | | | | A former mining village near Flat and Iditarod. |
| Pastuliq | | | | | | | |
| Pedro | | | | | | | |
| Pilgrim Springs | Pilgrim Hot Springs, Kruzgamepa | | | | | | A mission that once contained an orphanage for children orphaned by the Influenza epidemic of 1918. |
| Poorman | | Yukon-Koyukuk Census Area | | | | | |
| Port Alexander | | | | | | Historic | |
| Port Wakefield | | Kodiak Island Borough | | | | | |
| Portage | | Anchorage | | | | | |
| Portlock | | Kenai Peninsula Borough | | | | | |
| Prospect Creek | | Yukon-Koyukuk Census Area | | | | | |
| Seaside | | | | | | | |
| Snettisham | | Juneau Borough | | | | | |
| Speel River | | | | | | | |
| Sulzer | | Prince of Wales-Hyder Census Area | | | | | |
| Three Saints Bay | | Kodiak Island Borough | | | | | |
| Tikigaq | Point Hope | | | | | | Tikigaq, the Tikigagamiut village which existed before the current settlement of Point Hope, was abandoned due to erosion. |
| Tin City | | Nome Census Area | | | | | |
| Toklat | | | | | | | |
| Treadwell | | Juneau | | | | | |
| Unga | | Aleutians East Borough | | | | | |
| White Eye | | Yukon-Koyukuk Census Area | | | | | |
| York | | Nome Census Area | West of Wales | | | | Every resident of York died during the Influenza epidemic of 1918. |

== Gallery ==
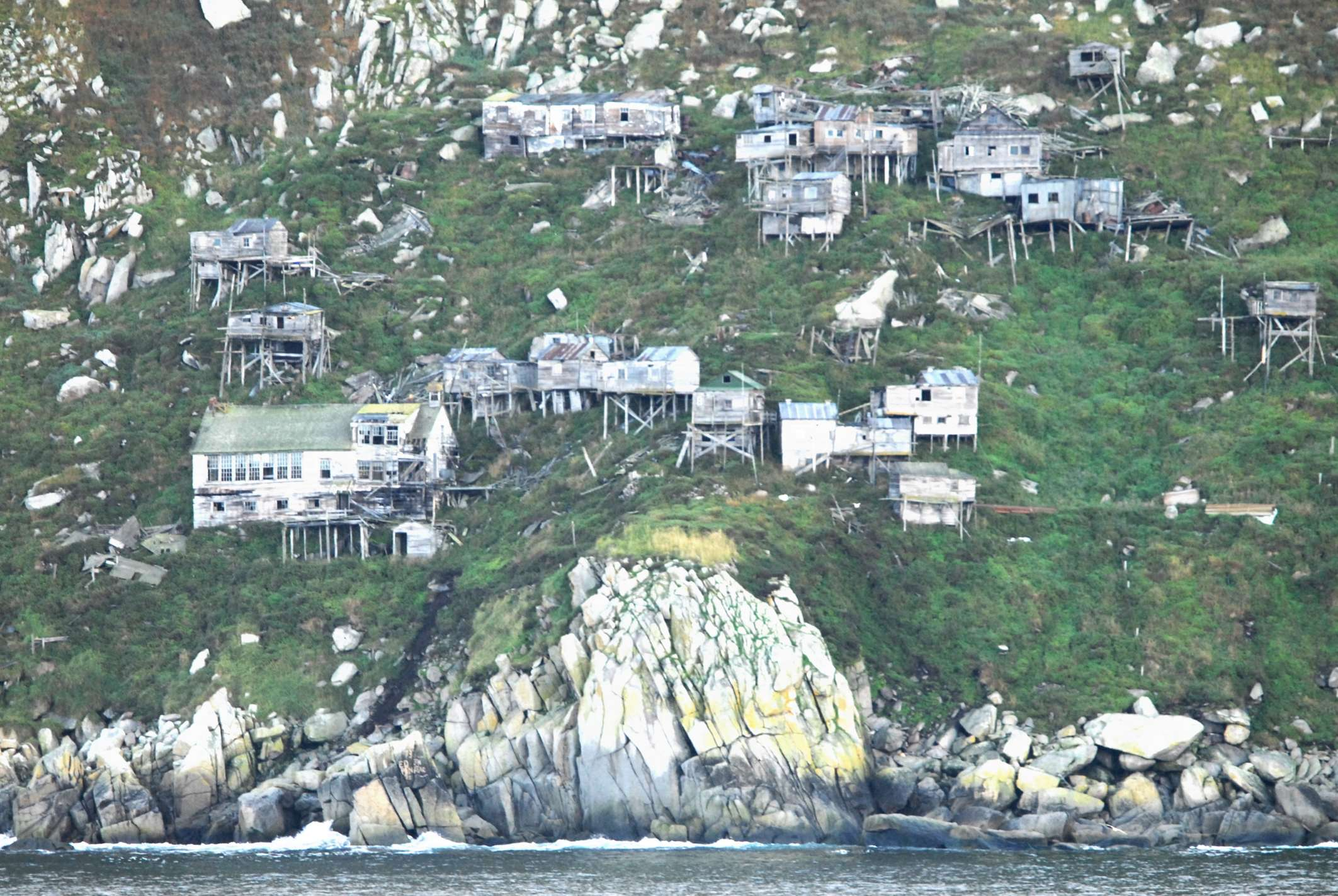
Ugiuvak, abandoned Inupiat stilt village, in 2010. The large white building near the bottom of the slope is the former Bureau of Indian Affairs school.

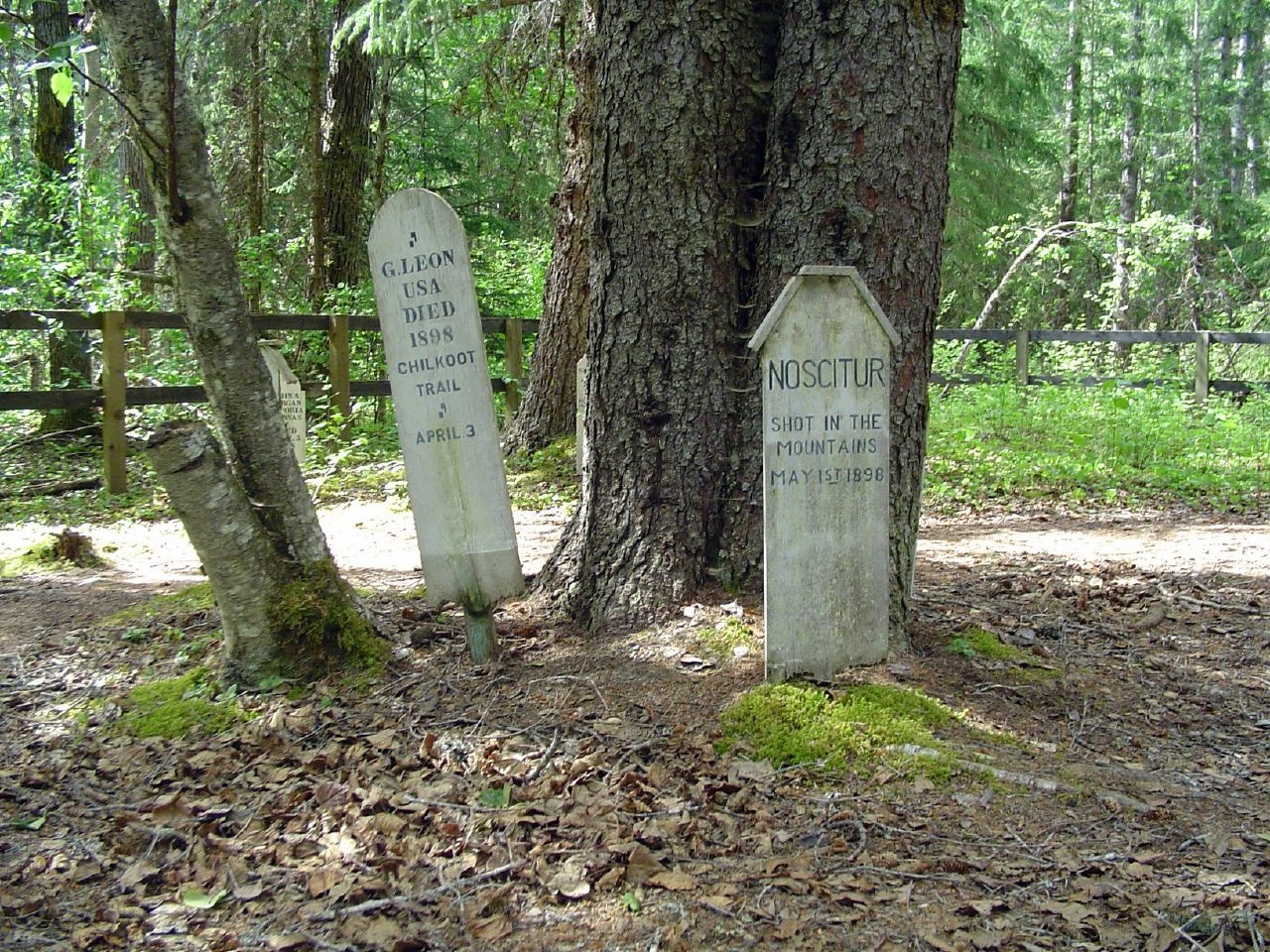
One of three graveyards at Dyea, this one composed almost entirely of victims of a single Avalanche in 1898

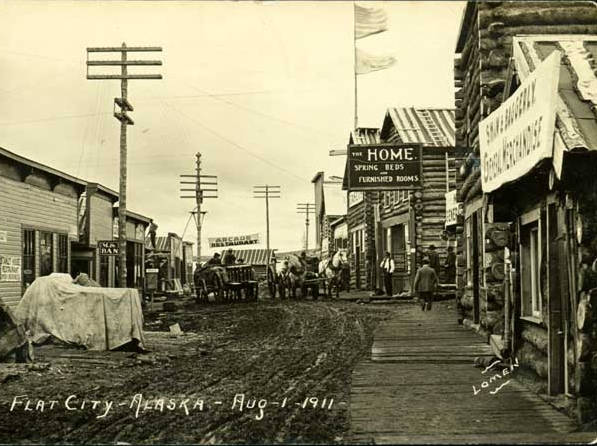
Flat, August 1, 1911

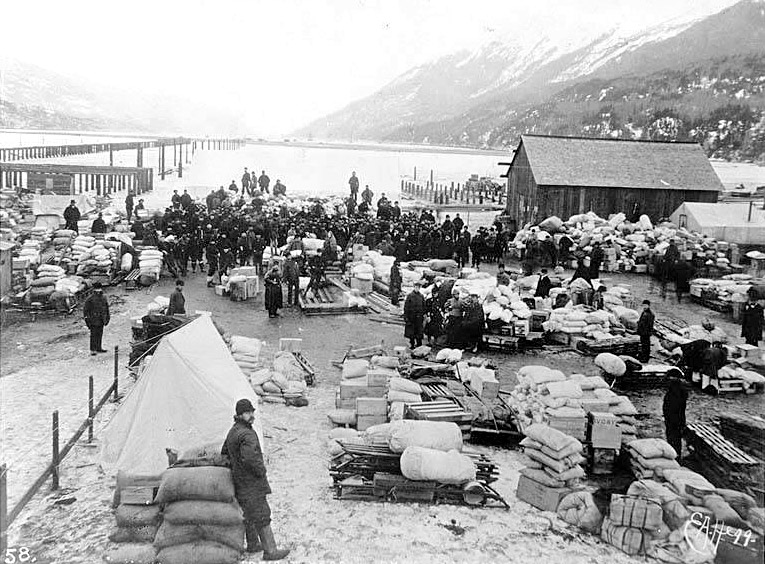
The waterfront at Dyea during the Klondike Gold Rush
