= Biorka =

Biorka may refer to:

== Places ==
- Biorka, Alaska, an abandoned village on Sedanka Island, Alaska, United States
- Biorka Island, and island near Sitka, Alaska, United States
