= Front Street =

Front Street may refer to:

- Frontstreet (album), a mixtape by OFB, with Bandokay, SJ, and Double Lz
- Front Street (Manhattan)
- Front Street (Toronto)
- Front Street (Philadelphia)
- Front Street (Battle Mountain, Nevada)
- Front Street (Juneau, Alaska)
- High Street, Front Street in some UK and Commonwealth dialects of English, referring to the primary business street of a town
