= Chuloonawick, Alaska =

Unincorporated community in Alaska, U.S.

- Unincorporated community
- Seal

- Location in Alaska
- Coordinates: 62.9471°N 164.1683°W
- Country: United States
- State: Alaska
- Borough: Unorganized
- Census area: Kusilvak

Population
  - Total: 0
- Time zone: UTC-9 (Alaska (AKST))
  - Summer (DST): UTC-8 (AKDT)
- ZIP Code: 99581-0245
- Area code: 907
- Website: chuloonawick.org (offline)

Chuloonawick (Note: Also spelled "Chuloonavik") ("the place where they salt fish" in Yupik), officially known as Chuloonawick Native Village, is an unincorporated community and ghost town in Kusilvak Census Area, Alaska, United States. It has no remaining structures and was located between the cities of Emmonak and Kotlik.

The village was inhabited by the Chuloonawick tribe and currently functions as a fishing camp.

== History ==
Chuloonawick was first recorded as "Kwikpakamiut" ("Kwikpak" for short) by the U.S. Coast and Geodetic Survey in 1879.

According to the Associated Press in 1969, Chuloonawick had approximately 130 residents. That year, the Alaska House of Representatives passed a resolution to request the federal government to establish a post office in the village. After the site was abandoned, its residents moved to nearby Emmonak.

In 2011, former tribal administrator Kathleen Lamont (née Blanket) was sentenced to 12 months in prison for embezzlement. She used roughly $100,000 of the village's funds on personal expenses and gambling between 2004 and 2007.

While the Chuloonawick tribe currently lives in Emmonak, they consider the site their home. As of 2024, there are plans to redevelop the land.

== See also ==
- List of ghost towns in Alaska
