= Sedanka Island =

Island in the United States of America

Sedanka
Native name: Sidaanax̂
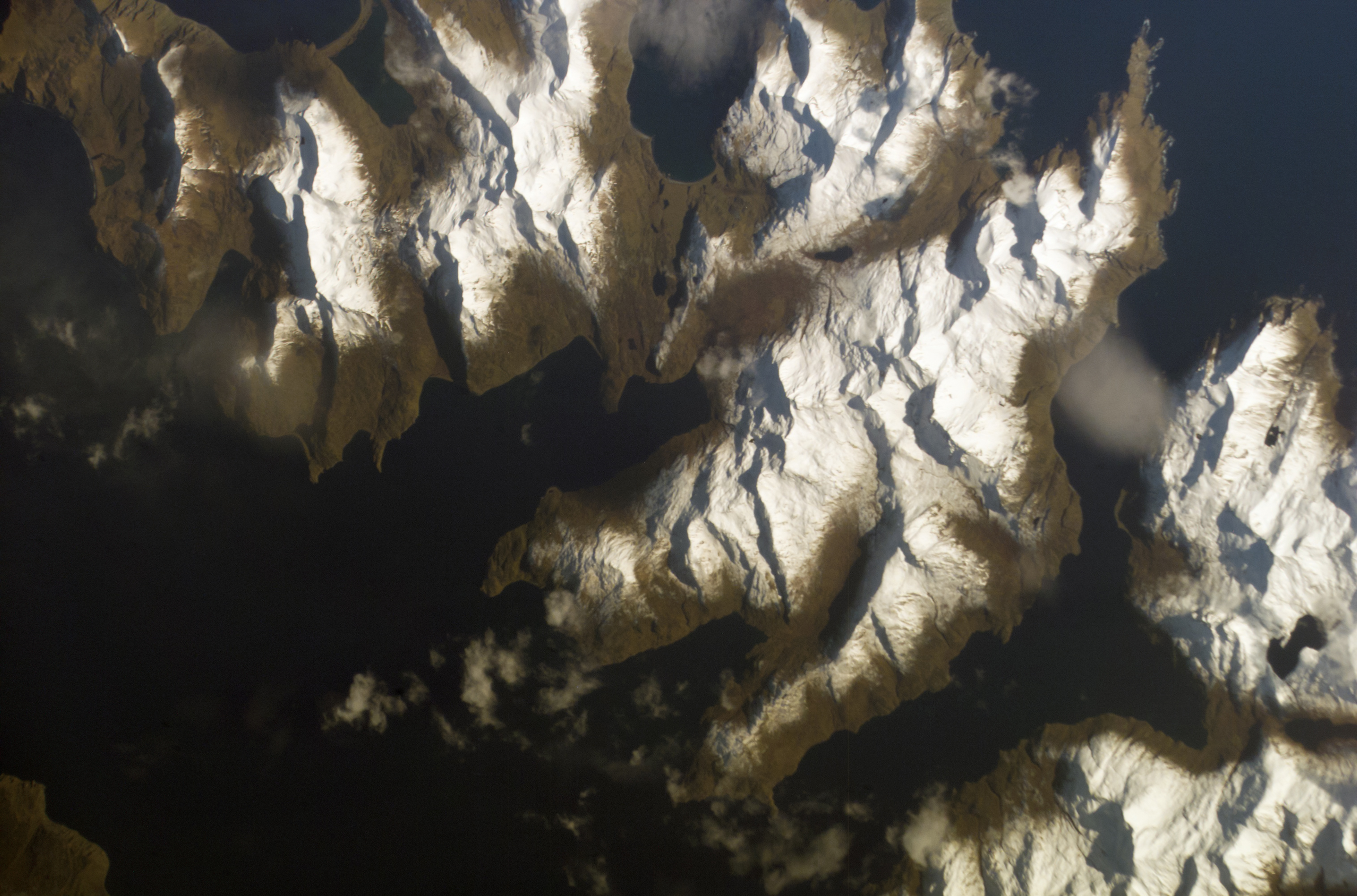
- NASA photo of Sedanka Island.

- Location within Alaska

Geography
- Location: Northern Pacific Ocean
- Coordinates: 53°47′00″N 166°11′29″W
- Archipelago: Aleutian Islands
- Area: 39.889 sq mi (103.31 km^{2})
- Length: 16.6 km (10.31 mi)
- Highest elevation: 1,345 ft (410 m)

Administration
- United States
- State: Alaska
- Borough: Aleutians East

Demographics
- Population: Uninhabited

Sedanka Island (Aleut: Sidaanax̂) is an island in the Fox Islands group of the eastern Aleutian Islands, Alaska. It is 10.3 miles (16.6 km) long and is situated off the northeast coast of Unalaska Island. It has a land area of 39.889 square miles (103.31 km^{2}) and no permanent population.

== History ==
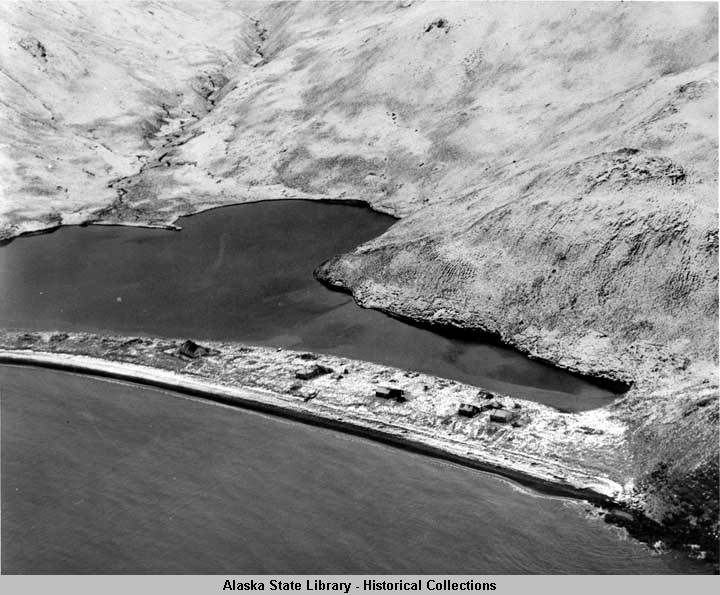
Aerial view of Biorka in the early 1940s

The Aleut village of Biorka was located on the Northern part of the island, at the entrance to Udamat Bay. In June 1942 following the start of the Aleutian Islands Campaign the village was evacuated. In 1945 when the evacuated Aleuts were allowed to return to the Aleutian Islands the authorities concluded that the required cost of rebuilding and re-settling the village was too high and the villagers were initially forbidden from returning to their villages. Attempts were made to re-settle Biorka, however the population dwindled due to the isolated location until a storm in 1952 damaged most of the remaining houses forcing the remaining residents to move to Unalaska; there has been no permanent population on the island since. A small fishing vessel was wrecked on the eastern coast of the island. As of 2025, it is still there.
