= Front Street (Juneau, Alaska) =

Street in Juneau, Alaska

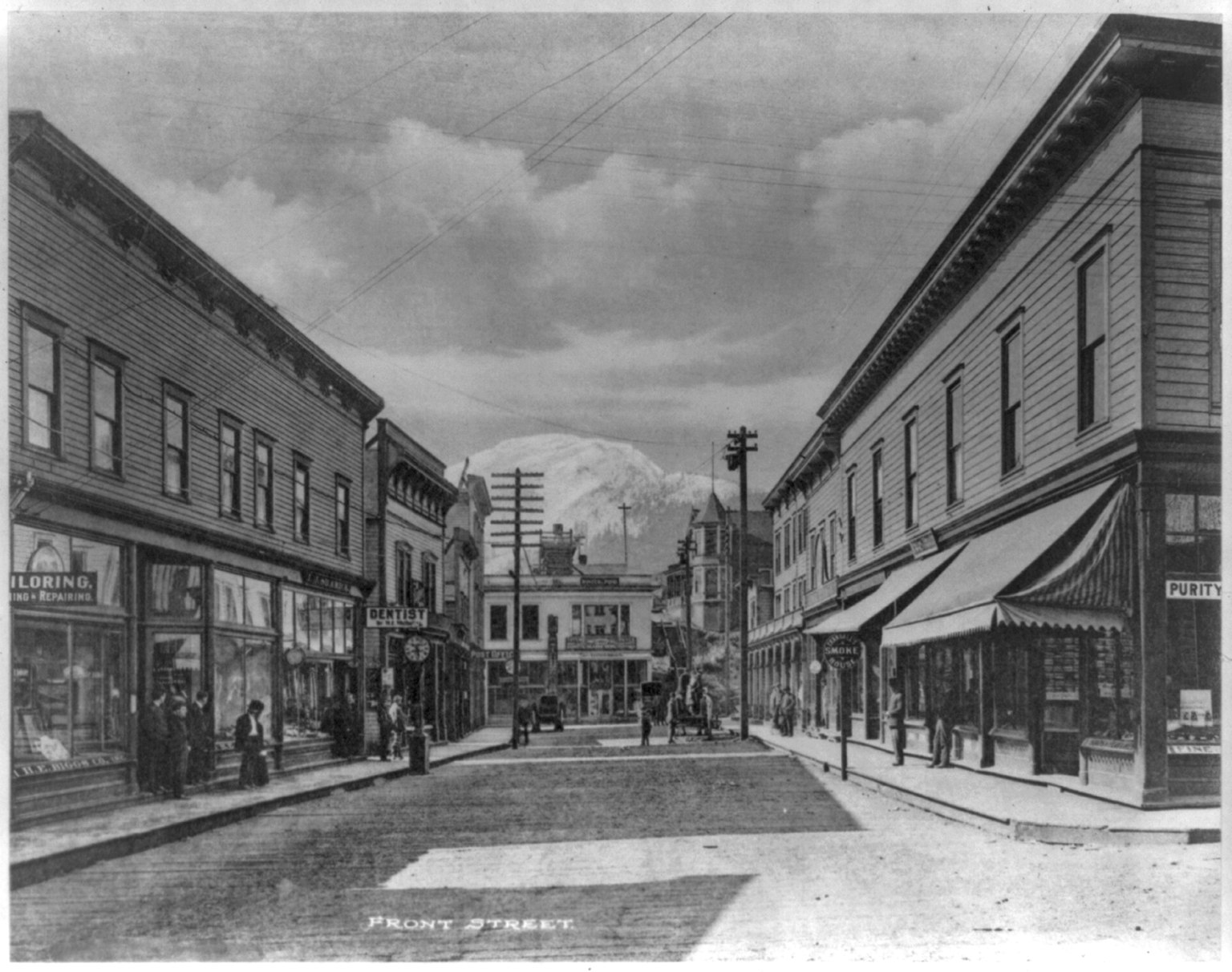
Front Street in 1909, by Winter & Pond

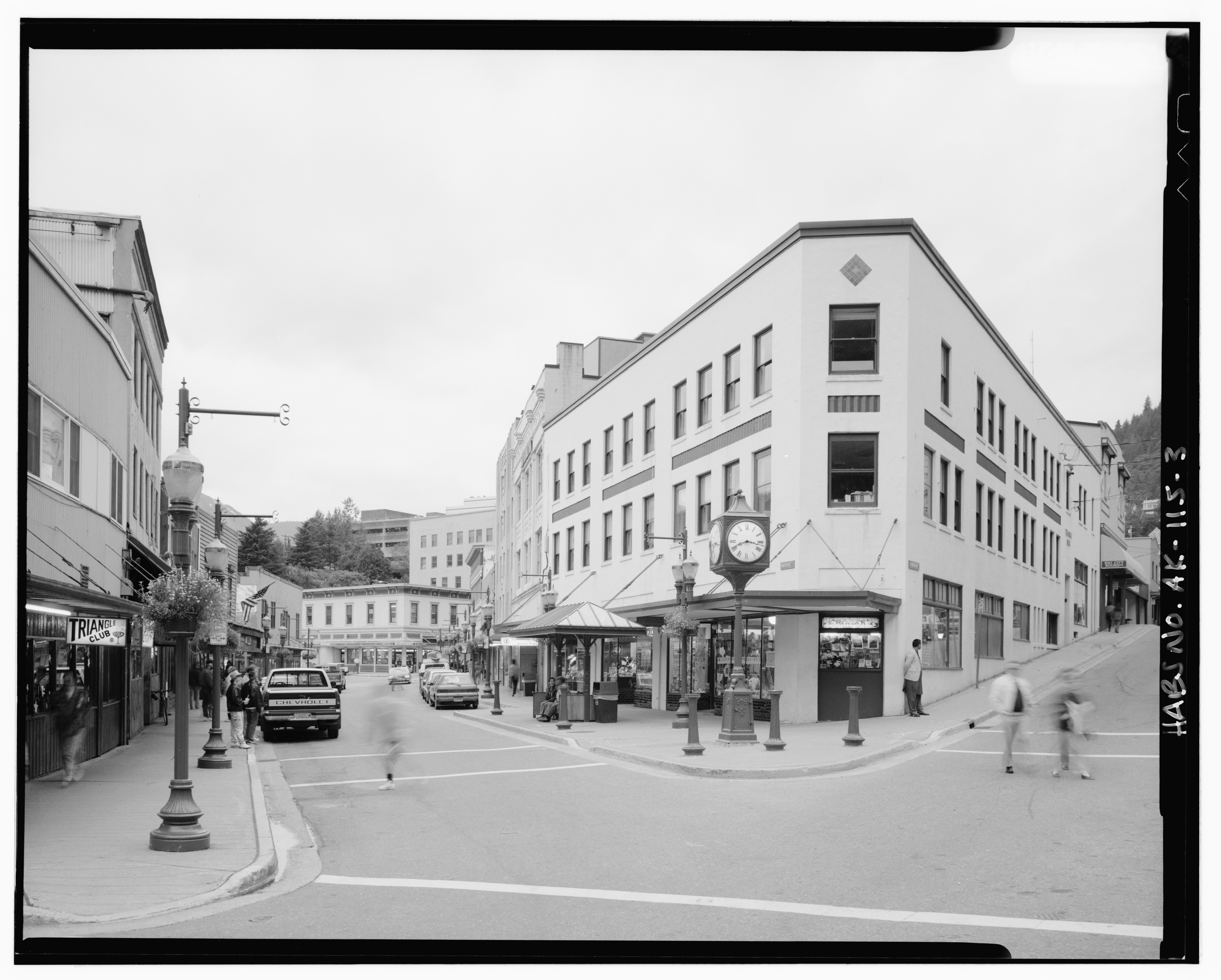
Historic American Buildings Survey photograph of the corner of Franklin and Front Streets

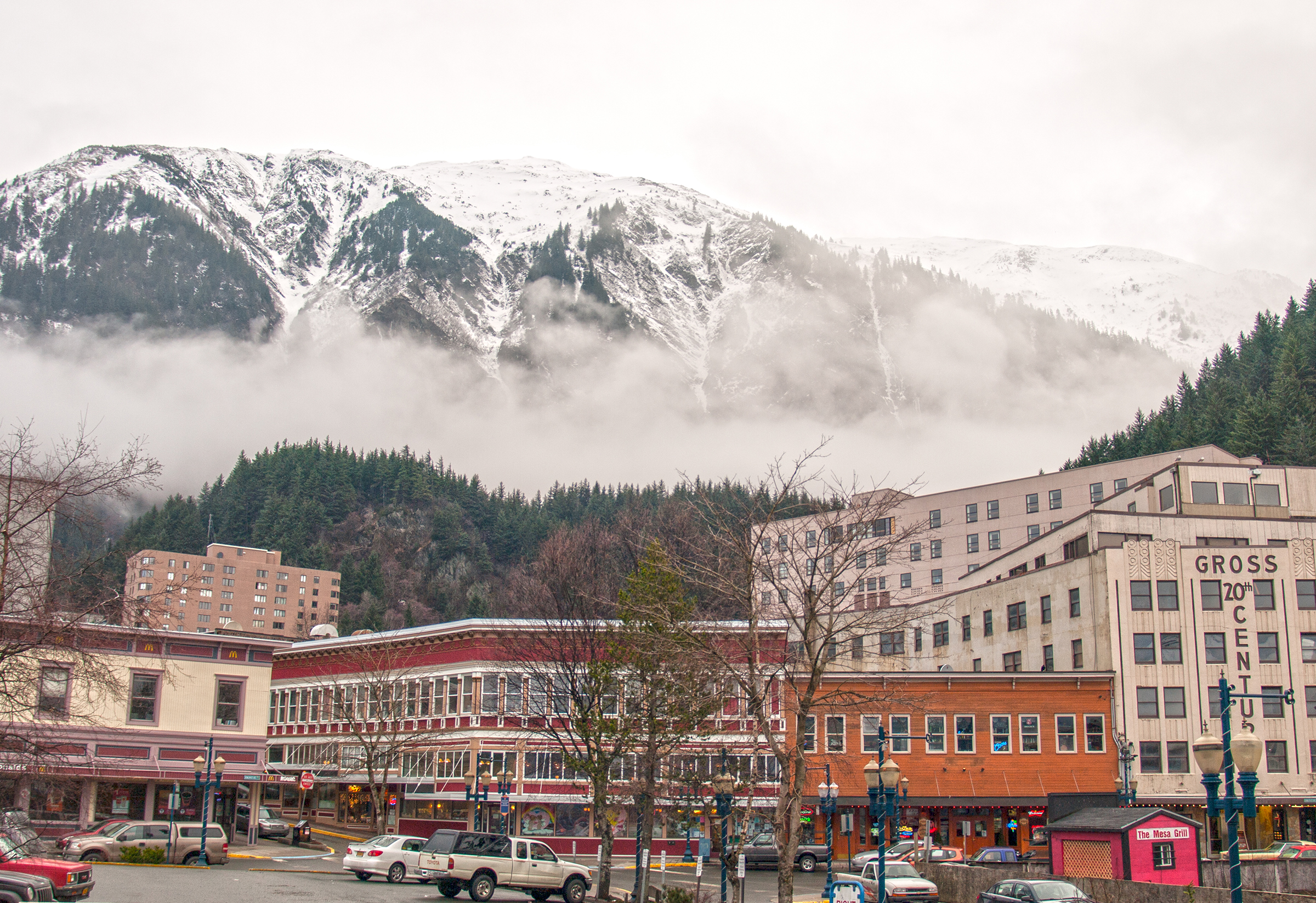
Mount Juneau above a view of a downtown area including Front Street

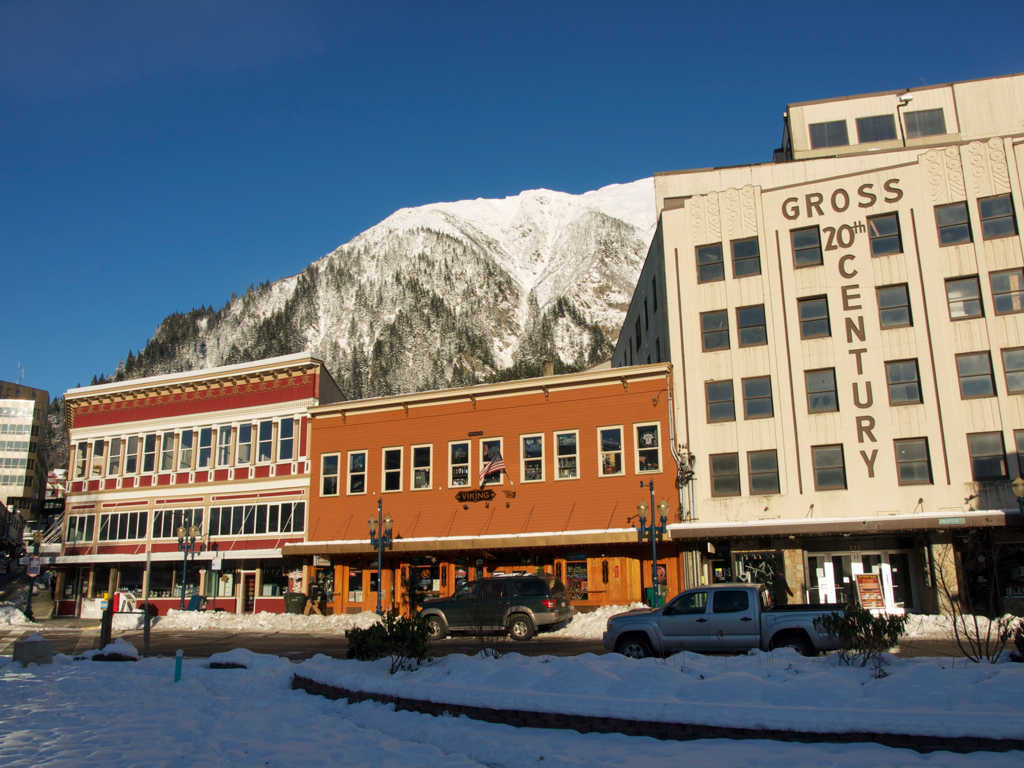
View of Front Street, 2012

Front Street is in downtown Juneau, Alaska. It was at the water's edge before mine tailings were used as fill to expand the city. Front Street is now part of the Juneau Downtown Historic District.

The House of Wickersham was at 213 Seventh Street and Front Street. The Valentine Building (1904) is at 202 Front Street. The Hellenthal Building (1916) at 100 Front Street has been home to the Palace Theater, a vaudeville venue, and later a film theater. It is now home to Devil's Club Brewing Company's brewery and taproom. The Triangle Bar at 251 Front Street has a mural in it. According to Fodor's the Viking Lounge at 218 Front Street sells more alcohol than any bar in Southeast Alaska.

Juneau's first bar was at 241 Front Street (1891) and is now the Imperial Bar with a pressed tin ceiling from 1906. The Imperial hosted the Front Street Cafe serving Russian dumplings and "super tots" until 2018. Jorgenson's Hardware was also on Front Street and the 1896 building at 130 Front Street is now a McDonald's.
