= Aleutian Islands campaign =

World War II campaign between Allied and Imperial Japanese forces

- Part of the American Theater and Pacific War of World War II
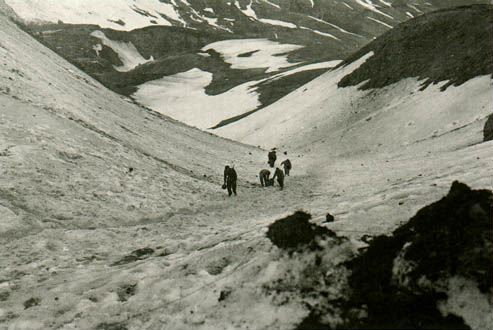
- American troops hauling supplies through Jarmin Pass on Attu in May 1943. Their vehicles could not move across the island's rugged terrain.
Date	3 June 1942 – 15 August 1943 (1 year, 2 months, 1 week and 5 days)
Location	Aleutian Islands, Alaska, United States 52°49′57″N 173°04′21″E
Result	Allied victory

Belligerents
United States • Alaska Territorial Guard; Canada	Japan

Commanders and leaders
(United States) U.S. Navy: Thomas Kinkaid; Francis Rockwell; (United States) U.S. Army: Albert E. Brown; Archibald Arnold; Simon Buckner, Jr.; Alaska Territorial Guard: Marvin R. Marston; Canadian Army: George Pearkes; Harry Foster	(Empire of Japan) I.J. Navy: Boshiro Hosogaya; Kakuji Kakuta; Monzo Akiyama; (Empire of Japan) I.J. Army: Yasuyo Yamasaki †

Strength
144,000	8,500

Casualties and losses
1,482 killed; 640 missing; 3,416 wounded; 8 captured; 225 aircraft destroyed; 3 warships sunk; U.S. Navy vessels heavily damaged: USS Salt Lake City (CA-25); USS Abner Read (DD-526); U.S. Navy vessels lost: USS Worden (DD-352); USS S-27 (SS-132); USS Grunion (SS-216)	4,350 killed 28 captured 7 warships sunk 9 cargo/transport ships sunk Imperial Japanese Navy vessels lost: Arare; I-7; I-31; Nenohi; Oboro; Ro-61; Ro-65
- 2 civilians killed, 46 captured (16 died in captivity)

The Aleutian Islands campaign (Japanese: アリューシャン方面の戦い, romanized: Aryūshan hōmen no tatakai) was a military campaign fought between 3 June 1942 and 15 August 1943 on and around the Aleutian Islands, part of the US Territory of Alaska, in the American Theater of World War II during the Pacific War. It was the only military campaign of World War II fought on North American soil.

The islands' strategic value was their ability to control Pacific transportation routes. U.S. General Billy Mitchell told the U.S. Congress in 1935, "I believe that in the future, whoever holds Alaska will hold the world. I think it is the most important strategic place in the world." The Japanese reasoned that their control of the Aleutians would prevent a possible joining of forces by the Americans and the Soviets and future attack on the Japanese mainland via the Kuril Islands. Similarly, the U.S. feared that the islands could be used as bases from which to launch air raids on West Coast cities such as Anchorage, Seattle, San Francisco, or Los Angeles.

Following two aircraft carrier-based attacks on the American naval base at Dutch Harbor, the Imperial Japanese Navy occupied the islands of Attu and Kiska in June 1942. The remoteness of the islands and the challenges of weather and terrain delayed a larger American-Canadian force sent to eject them for nearly a year. A battle to reclaim Attu was launched on 11 May 1943 and completed after a final Japanese banzai charge on 29 May. On 15 August 1943 an invasion force landed on Kiska in the wake of a sustained three-week barrage, only to discover that the Japanese had withdrawn from the island on 29 July. The campaign is known as the "Forgotten Battle" because it has been overshadowed by other events in the war.

Many military historians believe that the Japanese invasion of the Aleutians was a diversionary or feint attack during the Battle of Midway that was meant to draw out the U.S. Pacific Fleet from Midway Atoll, as it was launched simultaneously under the same commander, Isoroku Yamamoto. Some historians have argued against that interpretation and believe that the Japanese invaded the Aleutians to protect their northern flank and did not intend it as a diversion.

== Japanese attack ==
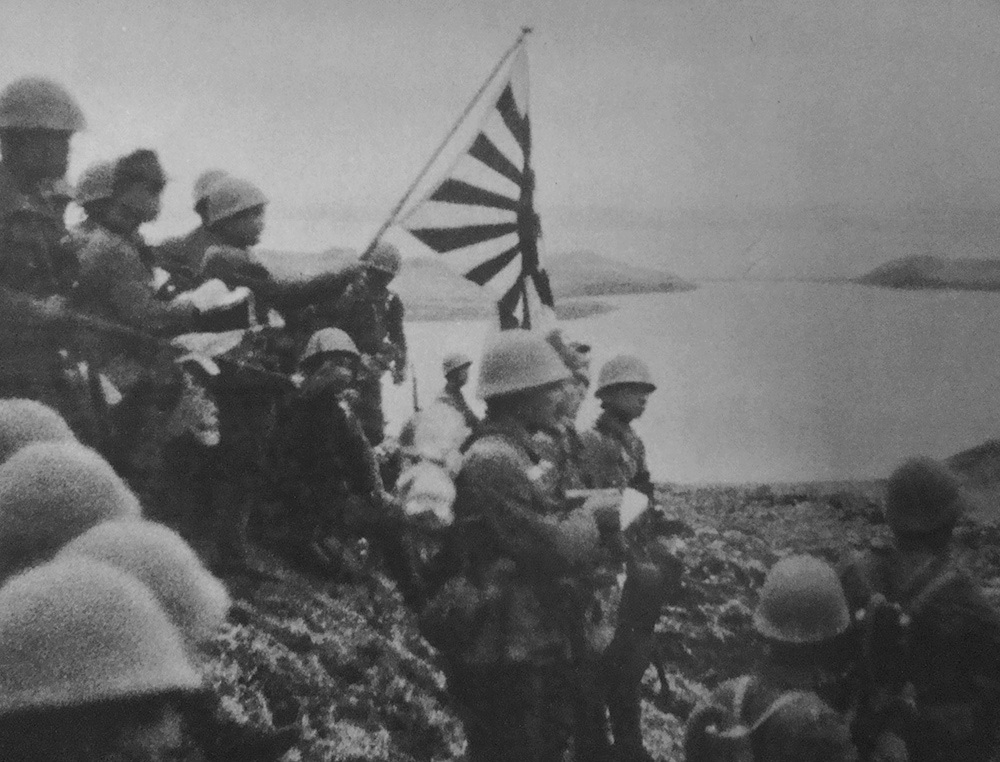
Japanese troops raise the Rising Sun Flag on Kiska Island in the Aleutians on June 6, 1942.

Before the Empire of Japan entered World War II, the Imperial Japanese Navy had gathered extensive information about the Aleutians but had no up-to-date information regarding military developments on the islands. Admiral Isoroku Yamamoto provided the Japanese Northern Area Fleet with a force of two non-fleet aircraft carriers, five cruisers, twelve destroyers, six submarines, and four troop transports, along with supporting auxiliary ships. With that force, Hosogaya was to launch an air attack against Dutch Harbor then follow with an amphibious attack upon Adak Island, 480 miles (770 km) to the west. Hosogaya was instructed to destroy whatever American forces and facilities were found on Adak, but the Japanese did not know the island was undefended. Hosogaya's troops were to return to their ships and become a reserve for two additional landings: the first on Kiska, 240 miles (390 km) west of Adak, the other on the Aleutians' westernmost island, Attu, 180 miles (290 km) west from Kiska.

Because the Office of Naval Intelligence had broken the Japanese naval codes, Admiral Chester Nimitz learned by May 1942 of Yamamoto's plans, including the Aleutian invasion, the strength of both Yamamoto's and Hosogaya's fleets, and Hosogaya's plan to attack the Aleutians on 1 June or shortly thereafter.

As of 1 June, the U.S. military strength in Alaska stood at 45,000 men, with about 13,000 at Cold Bay (Fort Randall) on the tip of the Alaska Peninsula and at two Aleutian bases: Dutch Harbor on Unalaska Island, 200 miles (320 km) west of Cold Bay, and the recently built Fort Glenn Army Air Base on the island of Umnak 70 miles (110 km) west of Dutch Harbor. Army strength, less air force personnel, at those three bases totaled no more than 2,300, composed mainly of infantry, field and anti-aircraft artillery troops, and a large construction engineer contingent, which was used in the construction of bases. The Army Air Force's Eleventh Air Force consisted of 10 B-17 Flying Fortress heavy bombers and 34 B-18 Bolo medium bombers at Elmendorf Airfield, and 95 P-40 Warhawk fighters divided between Fort Randall and Fort Glenn. The forward headquarters was set up at Fort Geely, while the rear units were stationed at Fort Richardson. The naval commander was Rear Admiral Robert A. Theobald, commanding Task Force 8 afloat, who as Commander North Pacific Force (ComNorPac) reported to Nimitz in Hawaii. Task Force 8 consisted of five cruisers, thirteen destroyers, three tankers, six submarines, as well as naval aviation elements of Fleet Air Wing Four.

When the first signs of a possible Japanese attack on the Aleutians were known, the Eleventh Air Force was ordered to send out reconnaissance aircraft to locate the Japanese fleet reported heading toward Dutch Harbor and attack it with bombers, concentrating on sinking Hosogaya's two aircraft carriers. Once the enemy planes were removed, Naval Task Force 8 would engage the enemy fleet and destroy it. On the afternoon of 2 June, a naval patrol plane spotted the approaching Japanese fleet, reporting its location as 800 nautical miles (1,500 km; 920 mi) southwest of Dutch Harbor. Eleventh Air Force was placed on full alert. Shortly thereafter bad weather set in, and no further sightings of the fleet were made that day.

Before the attack on Dutch Harbor, the Army's 4th Infantry Regiment, under command of Colonel Percy E. LeStourgeon, was established at Fort Richardson. LeStourgeon had previously designed a layout of base facilities—such as isolation of weapons and munitions depots—to protect against enemy attack.

=== Attack on Dutch Harbor ===
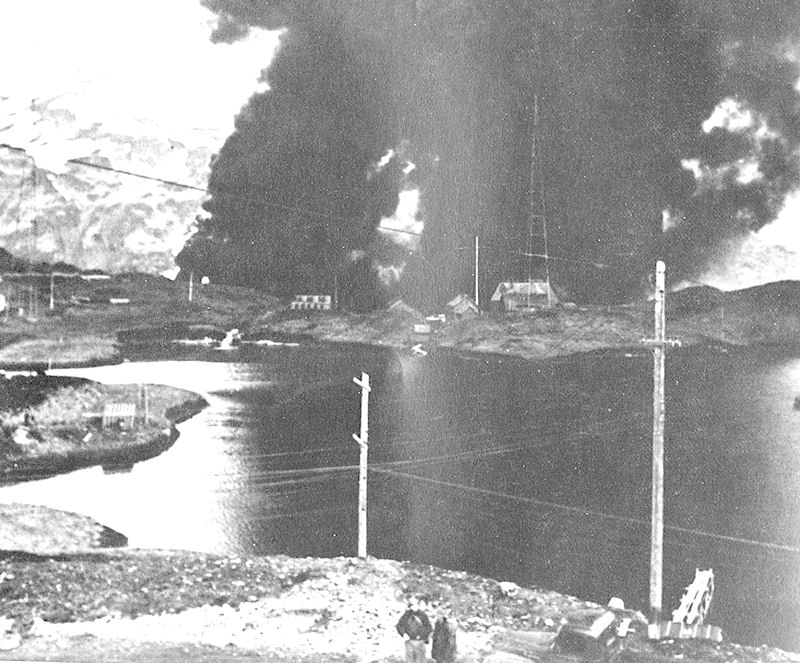
The Navy radio station at Dutch Harbor burning after the Japanese attack, June 4, 1942

According to Japanese intelligence, the nearest field for land-based American aircraft was at Fort Morrow Army Airfield on Kodiak, more than 600 miles (970 km) away, and Dutch Harbor was a sitting duck for the strong Japanese fleet, carrying out a coordinated operation with a fleet that was to capture Midway Island.

Making use of weather cover, the Japanese made a two-day aerial bombing of continental North America for the first time in history. The striking force was composed of Nakajima B5N2 "Kate" torpedo bombers from the carriers Jun'yō and Ryūjō. However, only half of the striking force reached their objective. The rest either became lost in the fog and darkness and crashed into the sea or returned to their carriers. Seventeen Japanese planes found the naval base, the first arriving at 05:45. As the Japanese pilots looked for targets to engage, they came under intense anti-aircraft fire and soon found themselves confronted by Eleventh Air Force fighters sent from Fort Glenn. Startled by the American response, the Japanese quickly released their bombs, made a cursory strafing run, and left to return to their carriers. As a result, they did little damage to the base.

On 4 June the Japanese returned to Dutch Harbor. This time, the Japanese pilots were better organized and prepared. When the attack ended that afternoon, Dutch Harbor oil storage tanks were burning, the hospital was partly demolished, and a beached barracks ship was damaged. Although American pilots eventually located the Japanese carriers, attempts to sink the ships failed because bad weather set in that caused the U.S. pilots to lose all contact with the Japanese fleet. However, the weather caused the Japanese to cancel plans to invade Adak with 1,200 men.

=== Invasion of Kiska and Attu ===
The Japanese invasions and occupations of Kiska on 6 June and Attu on 7 June shocked the American public, as the continental United States was invaded for the first time in 130 years since 1815 (during the War of 1812). The invading forces initially met little resistance from the local Unangax, also known as Aleuts. Though the U.S. Navy had offered to evacuate Attu in May 1942, the Attuan Unangax chief declined. Little changed for the Unangax under Japanese occupation until September 1942 when Japan's Aleutian strategy shifted. It was at this point that the Unangax were taken to Hokkaido, Japan, and placed in an internment camp.

Through the rest of the summer of 1942, aerial raids by either side could be flown only when the weather permitted. Japan installed a radar warning system on the islands and continued to resupply them, despite heavy disruptions against its shipping by U.S. bombers and submarines. The establishment of American air bases in Umnak and Cold Bay would add to the threat faced by the Japanese.

== Evacuation of the Unangax ==
The Unangax (Aleuts), the indigenous people of the Aleutian and Pribilof islands, were evacuated following the attacks on Dutch Harbor. Although they were U.S citizens, their legal status was often treated as that of "wards" of the federal government, a relationship that allowed the federal government to exercise significant control over their autonomy.

The evacuation process was hasty and chaotic. Unangax residents were often given less than 24 hours' notice, allowed one suitcase or minimal personal items. Over 880 Unangax were embarked on military transport ships. The invasion of Attu and imprisonment of the local Unangax became the justification for the United States' policy of forcible evacuation of the Unangax in the Aleutian Islands. Unangan civilians were placed in internment camps in the Alaska Panhandle.

On 12 June USS Gillis and Hulbert, stationed off Atka, received orders to remove the villagers and burn the village to prevent the buildings being used by the Japanese, should they take the island. Most of the natives were not at the village, as they had scattered to distant fish camps in case of an attack, meaning that by the time they were evacuated to Nikolski and then Unalaska most had been left with no personal possessions. Furthermore, the removal cleared Unangax homes for use by U.S. troops, who occupied the vacant houses for the duration of the war.

On 14 June USCGC Onondaga was ordered to evacuate the residents of Saint Paul, and on 16 June USAT Delarof evacuated the entire communities of Saint Paul and Saint George. On the way to southeast Alaska, Delarof stopped briefly at Unalaska to pick up the evacuees from Atka.

The evacuation continued at the end of the month when Dutch Harbor was ordered to evacuate Nikolski, Akutan, Kashega, Biorka and Makushin.

Only the Unangax were evacuated, while the white residents of the islands were made to stay behind to help the troops, resulting in the separation of some mixed families. Japanese men were separated from their Native wives and moved to the internment camps in the center of the United States. Children had the choice to either stay with their mothers or leave with their fathers.

=== Transport conditions ===
Transport vessels such as the USAT Delarof, were severely overcrowded and lacked basic infrastructure, including drinkable water, food, and medical care. Disease was rampant on the Delarof. In one documented case, a government doctor refused to enter the ship’s hold to provide medical assistance to those on board. During the trip, Haretina Kochutin gave birth under these conditions and without assistance. Her newborn daughter, Dela, died three days later.

=== Internment ===
Arrangements were hastily made to accommodate the Unangax in the Alaska Panhandle as they were already en route, and they were eventually interned across a handful of locations. Conditions were poor and lacked the sufficient infrastructure to house the internees. About ten percent of the interned population perished before resettlement after the war.

Japanese forces transported some Attuan captives to Otaru, Hokkaido, where they were held as prisoners of war for the remainder of the war. Approximately forty percent of the Attuan prisoners died in captivity due to starvation and malnutrition.

==== Funter Bay Cannery ====
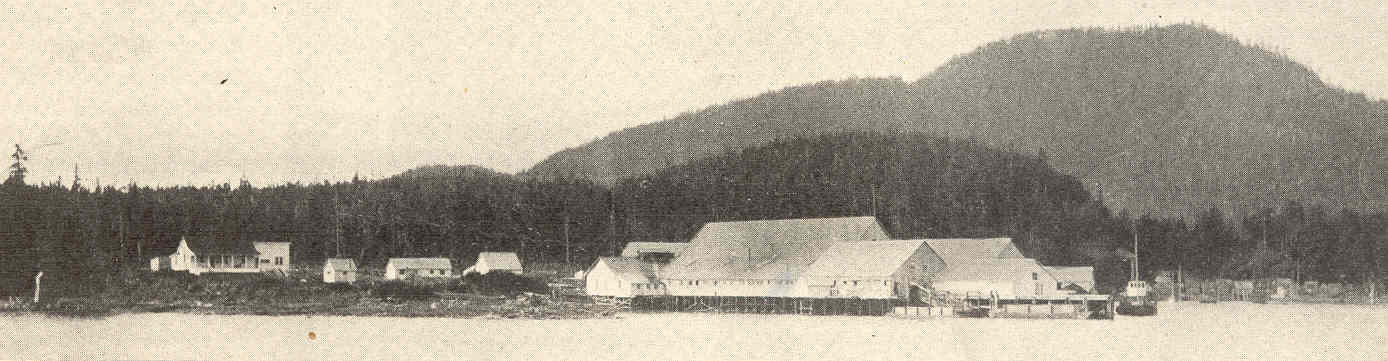
Thlinket Packing Co. Cannery in Funter Bay (1908)

The villagers of Saint Paul spent most of World War II at the Thlinket Packing Company cannery at Funter Bay. The cannery had previously ceased operation in 1931 and had been used as storage before being acquired by P.E. Harris Co in 1941. By 1942 the buildings had fallen into disrepair with only a caretaker and his wife living on site when the owners struck a deal with the U.S. Government on the June 16 to lease the property for $60 per month, and on June 24 the entire native population of Saint George and Saint Paul arrived at Funter Bay. The following day villagers of St George were shifted to the mine site about one mile away.

The villagers were left to their own devices to make the place livable, building beds and repairing the decaying buildings at the site. Water was often in short supply and contaminated, and the cabins which had not been intended for winter occupation lacked good insulation or heating.

==== Funter Bay Mine ====
Across the bay from the cannery, the villagers of Saint George were housed in the shoreside camp of the former Admiralty Alaska Gold Mine. By June 1942 the mine had been out of production for more than 15 years and only the onsite caretaker (Rado Pekovich) and one other person lived at the site. Eventually the mine was leased to the government for $1 per year to house the villagers.

The mining camp facilities were not adequate to house the number of villagers due to electrical hazards, poisonous chemicals left from the mining activities and only two outhouses for the entire population. Like for the cannery, health and sanitation were chronic problems.

==== Killisnoo Herring Plant ====
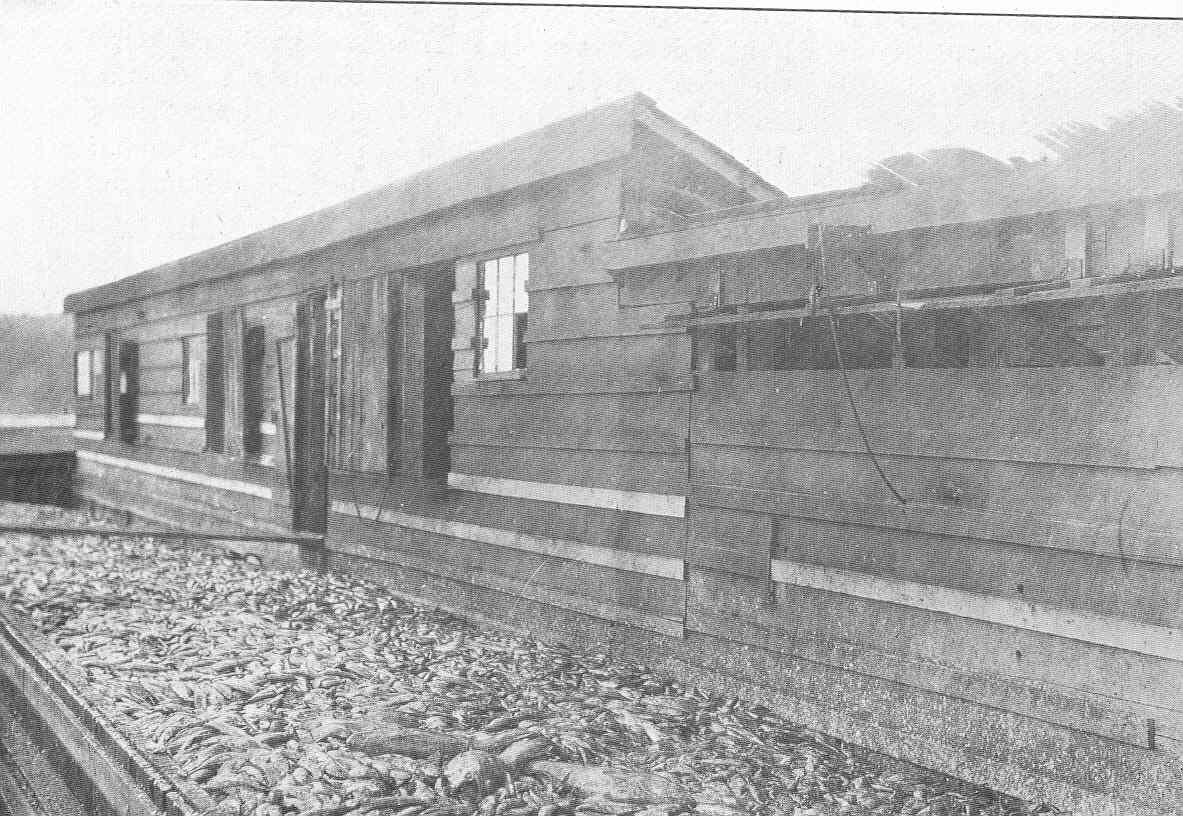
Killisnoo Reduction works (1915)

About 50 miles (80 km) south of Funter Bay was the derelict Killisnoo Herring plant. Operations there began in the 1870s; in 1928 almost all of the housing burnt down, leaving only the industrial plant and a few nearby buildings. By the 1930 census the population had plummeted to only three people from around 300 before the fire.

When the villagers of Atka arrived here around 25 June 1942 the available buildings included three houses, five cabins, a bunkhouse, a warehouse, a machine shop, a shed and a store. Most of the buildings were unheated, not built for winter occupation, and the villagers had been unable to bring any luggage. The villagers were left there with some bedding and four days' worth of food and received little federal attention thereafter and were largely left to fend for themselves. Like at the other camps Killisnoo suffered from poor water sources, poor sanitation, lack of plumbing and inadequate tools. Of the 83 villagers resettled at Killisnoo, 17 died during the war due to the conditions of the camp.

==== Wrangell Institute ====
The residents of Nikolski, Akutan, Unalaska, Makushin and Kashega were taken to a tent city that was quickly erected on the grounds of the Wrangell Institute, a boarding school set up by the Bureau of Indian Affairs in 1932, a few miles south of the town of Wrangell while more permanent accommodation was made ready. After the villagers were sent to the other camps the children were sent to the institute for schooling.

The first villagers arrived on July 13, consisting of 41 people from Akutan, 18 from Biorka, 20 from Kashega, 8 from Makushin, 72 from Nikolski and 1 from Unalaska. The remainder of the Unalaskans arrived there in the following weeks; however, sources differ on the date and the number of arrivals. The villagers were moved on and the camp was dismantled by early September.

==== Burnett Inlet Cannery ====
The 111 villagers from Unalaska were eventually settled at the cannery at the mouth of Burnett Inlet, located on the West side of Etolin Island after a deal was struck with the owners in late August 1942. The cannery was built in 1912 and had burned down in 1940 with the loss of many of the buildings. When the evacuees arrived they found eleven cabins and a bunkhouse still standing but in a dilapidated state, with a row of small cabins hastily constructed among the burned out ruins of the rest of the side. This was the most isolated of the evacuation sites and even though it suffered from overcrowding, lack of transportation, limited water, no bath house and one single outhouse for the entire community, it had the lowest mortality rate of the relocation camps. In the spring of 1944, 46 villagers from Biorka, Kashega and Makushin were moved to Burnett Inlet from the Ward Lake camp due to the overcrowding of that facility.

==== Ward Lake CCC Camp ====
Ward Lake is about 10 miles (16 km) northwest of Ketchikan. Starting in the 1920s after the construction of a section of the Tongass Highway between Ward Lake and Ketchikan allowed a commercial bus service between the two points, and recreational facilities started being built in the area. In 1933 the Civilian Conservation Corps (CCC) was established to provide work and training to the unemployed during the Great Depression and to advance nationwide conservation programs. The CCC built a small camp with a capacity for 65 men at Ward Lake in 1935, and by 1941 it served as a staging area for the CCC and engineering troops bound for Annette Island for the construction of an airfield. The CCC had ceased to exist in 1942 and the Unangan villagers were moved into the recently emptied camp.

163 villagers were moved to the camp, which was well above the capacity that it was built for, and new buildings were quickly built; none of the cabins had running water and the entire community had to share one privy, and the camp suffered from lack of medical services, poor sanitation and disease, leading to a high mortality of 18%. Unlike the other camps the villagers had easy access to nearby Ketchikan by road through the commercial bus service, and while this allowed the villagers to look for employment it caused some friction with the community.

==== Forced labor ====
The internment experience differed significantly across Unangax communities. While all were subjected to forced removal, those from the Pribilof Island were specifically exploited as a captive labor force. The U.S. government compelled the men to leave their families at the internment camps and return to the island to harvest seal pelts. The pay was low, rather than competitive market wages; the government paid only standard military wages. Although additional financial incentives were promised, almost none of the men received more than basic army pay, and many were not paid at all.

The seal harvest primarily benefited the Fouke Fur Company, who worked alongside the Fish and Wildlife Service to continue pelt operations in Alaska. In 1943, Approximately 117,164 seal pelts were harvested, generating over $465,000, a dramatic increase from 127 pelts harvested in 1942.

=== Tlingit ===
The Tlingit, on whose land the camps were constructed without consent, responded to the situation of the Unangax with assistance and hospitality. Members of the Tlingit provided food, water and shelter to the internees.

Tlingit locals shared traditional knowledge with the Unangax, including teaching Unangax women how to harvest local berries. Residents also provided material resources; at Killisnoo, Tlingit elder Annie Samato provided water from her property and strawberries from her garden. Following Samato’s example, many other Tlingit women also shared their berry patches.

In Angoon, the Tlingit community mobilized to feed the Unangax by hunting deer and fishing to supplement the meager government rations. Additionally, they provided blankets, mattresses, and medicine, subsidizing federal neglect.

=== Resistance and aftermath ===
In April 1943, groups of men from St. Paul and St. George wrote protest letters refusing to return to the islands unless they received fair wages ($1 per skin) and improved treatment. Their requests were denied.

The Alaska Native Brotherhood (ANB) and the Alaska Native Sisterhood (ANS) assisted in challenging the Fish and Wildlife Service authority. The ANB provided food and winter clothing. Roy Peratrovich played a role in spreading awareness to try and unite the Unangax in their endeavors. While their struggles failed to grant any significant settlements with the federal government, their efforts helped secure the Alaska Native Claims Settlement Act (ANCSA) in 1971.

In October 1942, a group of Women at Funter Bay signed a petition modeled after the Declaration of Independence, demanding better living conditions while asserting “We all have rights to speak for ourselves”.

The Unangax were not permitted to return to their homes until 1944 and 1945.

=== Looting ===
Upon returning to their communities, many Unangax families found their homes looted and vandalized by the U.S. military personnel. According to survivor accounts, such as that of Larcy Chercasen, families discovered broken furniture, barricaded homes, and extensive property damage. Many businesses, tools, and boats were destroyed, harming the economies of many villages after resettlement.

Through the Aleut Restitution Act of 1988 the federal government formally compensated the Unangax.

== Allied response ==
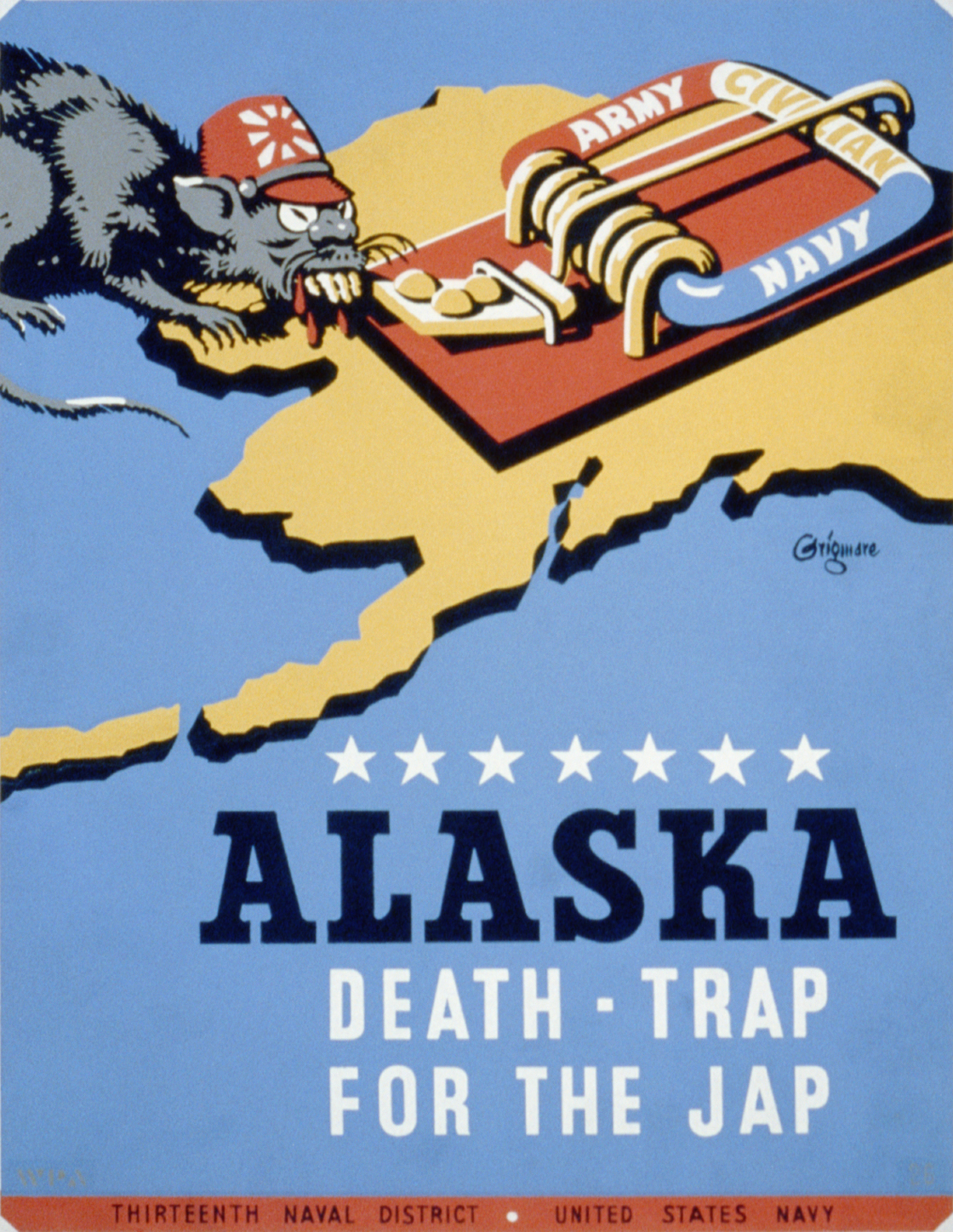
U.S. military propaganda poster from 1942/43 for Thirteenth Naval District, U.S. Navy, showing a rat with stereotypical attire representing Japan approaching a mousetrap labeled "Army – Navy – Civilian", on a background map of the Alaska Territory, referred to as future "Death-Trap For The Jap".

Many Americans feared that the Japanese would use the islands as bases to strike within range along the rest of the West Coast. Although the West Coast was subject to attack several times in 1942 (including unrestricted submarine warfare in coastal waters; the bombardment of Ellwood in California; and the bombardment of Fort Stevens in Oregon), the Aleutian Islands campaign of June 1942 was the first major operation by a foreign enemy in the American Theater. Lieutenant Paul Bishop of the 28th Bombardment Group recalled:

General Simon B. Buckner Jr. [of the Alaska Defense Command] said to us that the Japanese would have the opportunity to set up airbases in the Aleutians, making coastal cities like Anchorage, Seattle, and San Francisco vulnerable within range to attack by their bombers. The fear of that scenario was real at the time because the Japanese were nearly invincible and ruthless in Asia and the Pacific. We knew that they bombed China relentlessly and by surprise on Pearl Harbor, so we had to make sure it wouldn't happen here in the continental U.S. similar to what the Germans did over London and Coventry.

Lieutenant Bob Brocklehurst of the 18th Fighter Squadron stated:

[T]he impression we were given — and this was voiced oral stuff — was that we had nothing to stop the Japanese. [Our commanding officers] figured that the Japanese, if they wanted to, could have come up the Aleutians, taken Anchorage, and come down past down Vancouver to Seattle, Washington.

On 31 August 1942 American forces occupied Adak Island after scouting it two days earlier. It was considered a hostile environment to build an airbase due to weather conditions. To keep the Japanese on Kiska occupied, missions were flown there by bombers from the Eleventh Air Force. They were escorted by fighter aircraft, including P-38s from Umnak over 600 miles (970 km) away. Runway construction began immediately following the American landing. After 10 September, fighters and bombers were moved into the new Adak airbase and used to launch more bombing raids against Japanese positions on Kiska.

From September to November, American air raids were able to keep the total number of enemy aircraft low, usually under 14 frames, despite persistent attempts to reinforce their number by the Japanese. Without supporting carriers in the area, the Japanese were unable to dislodge the American forces on Adak. Even when they had a few air assets to spare, the Japanese generally avoided direct combat. Other supplies were also beginning to run low. After evacuating Attu, the Japanese contemplated occupying and setting up a new base on either the Semichis or Amchitka but were not able to carry out those plans.

In February 1943, the Americans successfully occupied Amchitka and built an airstrip there. Their main losses were a result of bad weather. Ground attack missions were flown from the new island base, starting with P-38s and P-40s before bombers also joined in. Their targets included radar installations, parked aircraft, anti-aircraft artillery positions, railway, submarine base, and moored vessels. The bombings further reduced Japan's ability to supply its bases, hampered its construction of landing strips on Attu and Kiska, and facilitated the recapture of those two islands later that year. In April 1943 Japanese surface convoys made their final attempt to break through American naval blockade and resupply troops on Attu and Kiska but were forced to abort after being defeated in battle. Future Japanese resupply missions would be conducted exclusively by submarines and limited by how much materiel they could bring.

Navy submarines and surface ships had also been patrolling the area. Kiska Harbor was the main base for Japanese ships in the campaign and several were sunk there, some by warships but mostly in air raids. On 5 July 1942 the submarine Growler, under command of Lieutenant Commander Howard Gilmore, attacked three Japanese destroyers off Kiska. She sank one and heavily damaged the others, killing or wounding 200 Japanese sailors. Ten days later, Grunion was attacked by three Japanese submarine chasers in Kiska Harbor, with two of the patrol craft sunk and one other damaged. On 12 May 1943 the Japanese submarine I-31 was sunk in a surface action with the destroyer Edwards 5 mi (4.3 nmi; 8.0 km) northeast of Chichagof Harbor.

At least three Japanese submarines were sunk near Kiska in June 1943, reportedly on the 11th, 13th, and 22nd.

=== Komandorski Islands ===
A cruiser and destroyer force under Rear Admiral Charles "Soc" McMorris was assigned to eliminate the Japanese supply convoys. They met the Japanese fleet in March 1943. One American cruiser and two destroyers were damaged, and seven U.S. sailors were killed. Two Japanese cruisers were damaged, with 14 men killed and 26 wounded. Japan thereafter abandoned all attempts to resupply the Aleutian garrisons by surface vessels, and only submarines would be used.

=== Attu Island ===
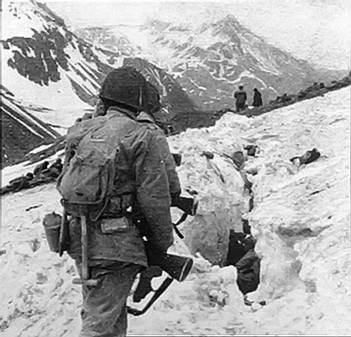
American troops endure snow and ice during the Battle of Attu in May 1943

On 11 May 1943 American forces commenced Operation Landcrab to recapture Attu. The invasion force included the 17th and 32nd Infantry regiments of the 7th Infantry Division and a platoon of scouts recruited from Alaska, nicknamed Castner's Cutthroats. The Army Air Force flew more than 500 sorties in a 20-day period to support the invasion. A shortage of landing craft, unsuitable beaches, and equipment that failed to operate in the appalling weather made it difficult however for the Americans to exert force against the Japanese. Soldiers suffered from frostbite because essential cold-weather supplies could not be landed, and soldiers could not be relocated to where they were needed because vehicles could not operate on the tundra. Rather than engage the Americans where they landed, Colonel Yasuyo Yamasaki had his forces dig into the high ground far from the shore. That resulted in fierce combat, with a total of 3,829 U.S. casualties, with 549 killed, 1,148 wounded, and another 1,200 suffering severe injuries from the cold weather. Also, 614 Americans died from disease and 318 from miscellaneous causes, mainly Japanese booby traps or friendly fire.

On 29 May 1943 without warning the remainder of Japanese forces attacked near Massacre Bay. Recorded as one of the largest banzai charges of the Pacific campaign, Yamasaki penetrated so deep into U.S. lines that Japanese soldiers encountered rear-echelon units of the Americans. After furious, brutal, often hand-to-hand combat, the Japanese force was virtually exterminated. Only 28 Japanese soldiers were taken prisoner, none of them were officers. American burial teams counted 2,351 Japanese dead, but it was thought that hundreds more had been buried by bombardment during the battle.

With its loss of Attu to U.S. forces, Japan was deprived of its only remaining airstrip in the Aleutians, a disadvantage that it could not compensate for because Japanese aviation units were entirely ground-based.

=== Kiska Island ===
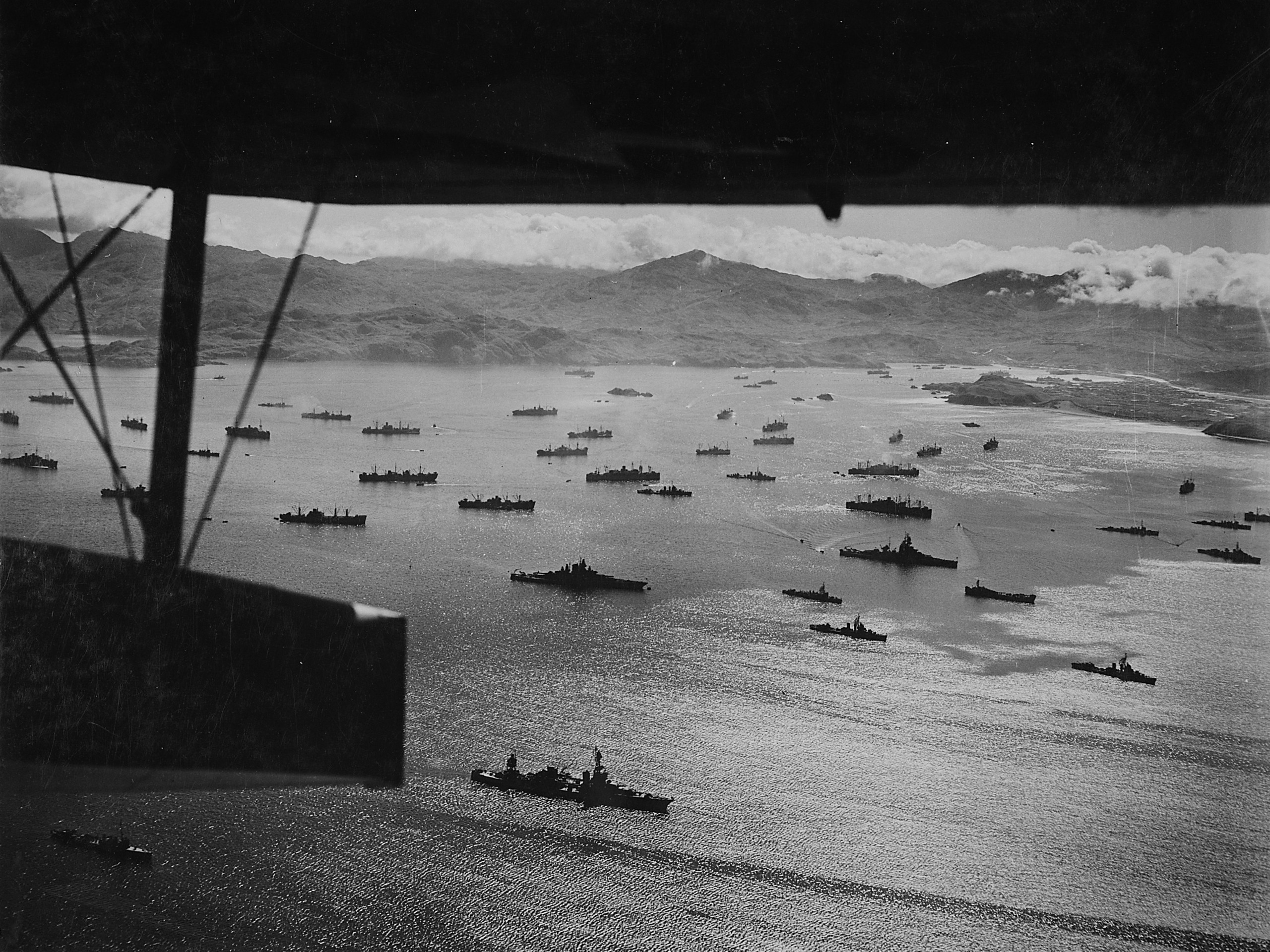
Part of the huge U.S. fleet at anchor, ready to move against Kiska.

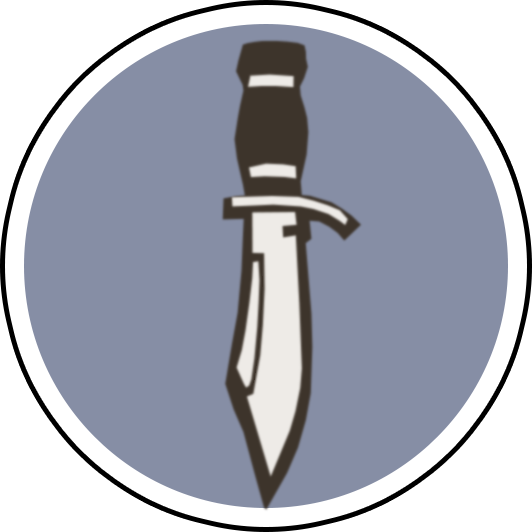
Kiska Task Force SSI

On 15 August 1943 an invasion force of 34,426 Canadian and American troops landed on Kiska. Castner's Cutthroats were part of the force, but the invasion consisted mainly of units from the 7th Infantry Division (United States). The force also included about 5,300 Canadians, mostly from the 13th Canadian Infantry Brigade of the 6th Canadian Infantry Division, and the 1st Special Service Force, a 2,000-strong Canadian-American commando unit trained in winter warfare techniques. The force included three 600-man regiments: the 1st was to go ashore in the first wave at Kiska Harbor, the 2nd was to be held in reserve to parachute where needed, and the 3rd was to land on the north side of Kiska on the second day of the assault. The U.S. 87th Regiment of the 10th Mountain Division, the only major U.S. force specifically trained for mountain warfare, was also part of the operation.

Royal Canadian Air Force Nos. 111 and 14 Squadrons saw active service in the Aleutian skies and scored at least one aerial kill on a Japanese aircraft. Additionally, three Canadian armed merchant cruisers and two corvettes served in the Aleutian campaign but did not encounter enemy forces.

It is likely that the main Japanese forces left Kiska on the night of 28 July when its radio became silent. During the subsequent two weeks, the U.S. Army Air Force and the U.S. Navy bombed and shelled the abandoned positions. The day before the withdrawal, the U.S. Navy fought an inconclusive and possibly meaningless Battle of the Pips 80 mi (70 nmi; 130 km) to the west.

The allied invasion forces encountered no opposition on 15 August, but their total casualties would in the end number 313 due to friendly fire, vehicle accidents, Japanese booby traps and explosives, disease and frostbite. Like Attu, Kiska offered an extremely hostile environment.

== Aftermath ==
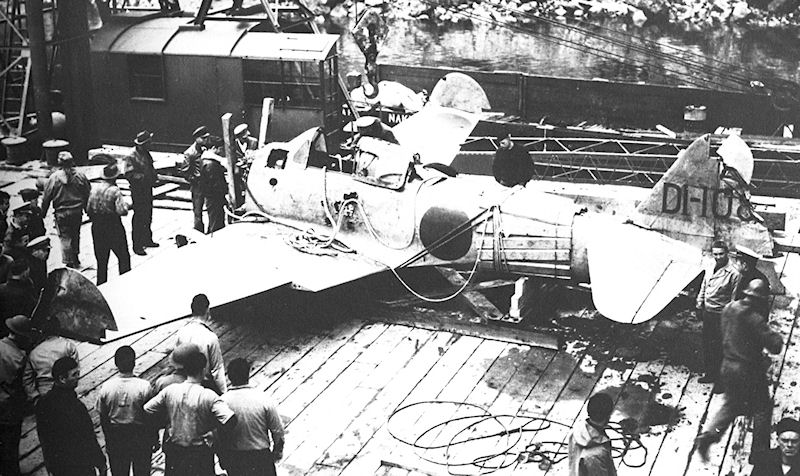
The Akutan Zero, captured intact by U.S. forces in July 1942 on Akutan Island, after the Battle of Dutch Harbor. After repairs, it became the first flyable Zero acquired by the U.S. during the war, and made its first test flight on 20 September 1942.

The loyal courage, vigorous energy and determined fortitude of our armed forces in Alaska—on land, in the air and on the water—have turned back the tide of Japanese invasion, ejected the enemy from our shores and made a fortress of our last frontier. But this is only the beginning. We have opened the road to Tokyo; the shortest, most direct and most devastating to our enemies. May we soon travel that road to victory.

— Lieutenant General Simon Bolivar Buckner Jr., a few months after the Aleutian Islands campaign

Although plans were drawn up for attacking northern Japan, they were not executed. Over 1,500 sorties were flown against the Kuriles before the end of the war, including the Japanese base of Paramushir, which diverted 500 Japanese planes and 41,000 ground troops.

The battle also marked the first time that Canadian conscripts were sent to a combat zone in World War II. The government had pledged not to send draftees "overseas", which it defined as being outside North America. The Aleutians were considered to be North American soil, which enabled the Canadian government to deploy conscripts without breaking its pledge. There were cases of desertion before the brigade sailed for the Aleutians. In late 1944, the government changed its policy on draftees and sent 16,000 conscripts to Europe to take part in the fighting. The battle also marked the first combat deployment of the 1st Special Service Force, but it did not see any action.

In the summer of 1942, the Americans recovered the Akutan Zero, an almost-intact Mitsubishi A6M2 Zero fighter, which enabled the Americans to test-fly the Zero and contributed to improved fighter tactics later in the war.

=== Killed in action ===
During the campaign, two cemeteries were established on Attu to bury those killed in action: Little Falls Cemetery, at the foot of Gilbert Ridge, and Holtz Bay Cemetery, which held the graves of Northern Landing Forces. After the war, the tundra began to take back the cemeteries and so in 1946, all American remains were relocated as directed by the soldiers' families or to Fort Richardson near Anchorage, Alaska. On 30 May 1946, a Memorial Day address was given by Captain Adair with a three-volley salute and the sounding of Taps. The Decoration of Graves was performed by Chaplains Meaney and Insko.

=== Resettlement of the Unangax ===
In the spring of 1944 the surviving residents of the Pribilofs were allowed to return home, while the remaining villagers were moved back in the spring of 1945 and the camps were dismantled.

The villagers of Saint Paul and Saint George were returned to their islands and were able to largely resume life as before.

While the residents of Nikolski were able to return to their village and resume life as before the other villagers were not so lucky. Atka Island had a military base and airstrip built close to the village which made it a target for the Japanese during the war and when the villagers returned the village was destroyed. The residents of Unalaska returned to a profoundly changed village with a large number of military installations.

The government did not allow the communities of Attu, Kashega, Biorka and Makushin to return to their villages because the cost of restoring their destroyed villages was deemed too great and they were forced to amalgamate into the other Unangan communities.

Of the 831 Unangax relocated to the camps in Southeast Alaska, 85 perished from the poor conditions.

Following the war, as part of the Treaty of San Francisco, the Japanese government offered the surviving residents of Attu reparations of $4,000 per year for three years, however some refused as they deemed their treatment too awful to be compensated with money; and the Japanese never compensated the families for the deaths in captivity as well as the loss of land and property.

== Legacy ==
Many of the United States locations involved in the campaign, either directly or indirectly, have been listed on the National Register of Historic Places, and several have been designated National Historic Landmarks. The battlefield on Attu and the Japanese occupation site on Kiska are both National Historic Landmarks and are included in the Aleutian Islands World War II National Monument. Surviving elements of the military bases at Adak, Umnak, and Dutch Harbor are National Historic Landmarks. The shipwrecked SS Northwestern, badly damaged during the attack on Dutch Harbor, is listed on the National Register, as is a crash-landed B-24D Liberator on Atka Island.

The 2006 documentary film Red White Black & Blue features two veterans of the Attu Island campaign, Bill Jones and Andy Petrus. It is directed by Tom Putnam and debuted at the 2006 Locarno International Film Festival in Locarno, Switzerland, on 4 August 2006.

Dashiell Hammett spent most of World War II as an Army sergeant in the Aleutian Islands, where he edited an Army newspaper. He came out of the war suffering from emphysema. As a corporal in 1943, he co-authored The Battle of the Aleutians with Corporal Robert Garland Colodny under the direction of Infantry Intelligence Officer Major Henry W. Hall.

In 1980 the Commission on Wartime Relocation and Internment of Civilians was appointed by the U.S. Congress to conduct a study on the internment of Japanese Americans, this was expanded to also look at the treatment of the Unangax. Public hearings were held starting in 1981 and testimonies were recorded and survivors began sharing their stories. The report condemned the government indifference to the conditions at the camps, citing crowding, rotting buildings, a lack of furniture, clean or running water, electricity, medical care and government supervision

In 1988 the U.S. Government passed the Aleut Restitution Act of 1988 which acknowledge the failure of the United States to provide adequate care to the Unangax and provided $12,000 for each survivor as well as a $5 million trust fund to help their descendants. In 1994 the act was expanded to include funding to cover property damage of churches sustained during the war.

== See also ==
- Military history of the Aleutian Islands
- Organization of the Imperial Japanese Navy Alaskan Strike Group
- Paul Nobuo Tatsuguchi, Japanese doctor stationed on Attu
- Report from the Aleutians, a 1943 American documentary propaganda film about the campaign, directed by John Huston
