= Ward Lake (Alaska) =

Lake and evacuation camp in Alaska, United States

- Location within Alaska
- Location: Southeastern Alaska
- Coordinates: 55°24′43″N 131°42′00″W
- Primary inflows: Ward Creek, Signal Creek
- Primary outflows: Ward Creek
- Basin countries: United States
- Surface area: 0.14 square kilometres (0.054 sq mi)
- Surface elevation: 16 metres (52 ft)

Ward Lake is a lake on Revillagigedo Island in the Alaskan Panhandle about 10 miles north of Ketchikan. Following the start of the Aleutian Islands Campaign the native villagers of the Aleutian Islands were relocated to a number of evacuation camps in the Alaskan Panhandle including a former Civilian Conservation Corps camp at Ward Lake.

== History ==
The name for Ward Lake and the nearby Ward Cove derive from a misspelling of the name of W.W. Waud who established a saltery in 1883-84 and subsequently drowned nearby in 1892.

In 1924, following construction of the Tongass Highway connecting Ketchikan with the nearby community of Ward Cove a commercial bus service was started between the two points. This also coincided with new federal policies supporting the recreational use of public forests meant that new picnic areas were built near the mouth of Ward Creek in 1925 and over the next couple of years a trail was cut around the lake.

During the Great Depression in 1933 the Civilian Conservation Corps (CCC) was created to provide employment and educational opportunities to young men while advancing a nationwide conservation program. As part of this program, in 1935 a CCC camp consisting of six bunkhouses and a number of other buildings with the capacity for 65 men was constructed at the lake.

=== World War II ===
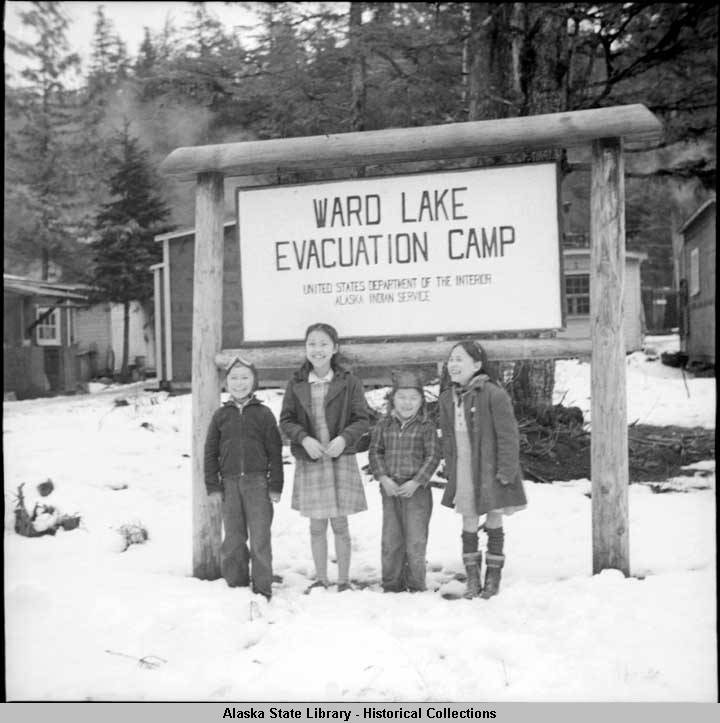
Children at the Ward Lake Evacuation Camp

Once the US entered the Second World War the CCC was disbanded and the camp briefly became a staging ground area for engineering troops during the winter of 1940–41, it was then unoccupied during the following winter.

In June 1942 the Battle of Dutch Harbor along with the Japanese occupation of Attu and Kiska signalled the start of the Aleutian Islands Campaign. The native Unangan villagers of the settlements west of Dutch Harbor were evacuated for their safety, however the evacuation was disorganized and the first arrangements for where the evacuees should stay were only made during transit. Ward Lake was chosen as one of these sites and hosted 157 people from the villages of Akutan, Biorka, Kashega, Makushin and Nikolski starting in August 1942, almost three times the intended capacity of the camp.

Conditions at the camp were difficult from the beginning with an unsanitary outhouse, no running water, no telephone and there was a lack of medical help when someone got sick. However, due to their proximity to Ketchikan the villagers were able to travel into the town for work.

Due to these conditions, Ward Lake was the second deadliest camp, recording 20 deaths among the villagers, including four of the five newborns, mostly from pneumonia and tuberculosis.

Their presence in what was a recreation spot for the people of Ketchikan also caused tensions when they were accused of causing health hazards as the pollution from the camp entered the waterway as the sceptic facilities were being used by more people than they were constructed for.

In May 1944, 46 people from the villages of Biorka, Makushin and Kashega were moved to the Burnett Inlet.

As the war was nearing its end in April 1945 the villagers left Ward Lake to return to the Aleutian Islands.

== Present Day ==
Following departure of the Unangans the pollution at the lake was remedied and it returned to being a recreation spot that is still in use to the present day. There is a trail that follows the circumference of the lake's shore.

In 2009 the US Forestry Service erected an information kiosk at the site of the site of the camp explaining the history of the location. Very little remains of the camp, however some features, including two concrete pedestals are still present.
