= Biorka Island =

Island in Sitka City and Borough, Alaska, United States

Coordinates: 56°51′14″N 135°31′59″W

Biorka Island is an island near Sitka, Alaska. The National Weather Service has a radar there. The island is also a popular spot to watch sealions. Thus, a 2005 proposal by the State of Alaska to give a parcel of 438 acres (177 ha) on the island to the University of Alaska stirred up a controversy.

The original name in the Tlingit language for the island is Watsíxh ("Caribou").

== Climate ==
Biorka Island has a subpolar oceanic climate (Köppen Cfc).

Climate data for Biorka Island
| Month | Jan | Feb | Mar | Apr | May | Jun | Jul | Aug | Sep | Oct | Nov | Dec | Year |
|---|---|---|---|---|---|---|---|---|---|---|---|---|---|
| Record high °F (°C) | 53 (12) | 52 (11) | 52 (11) | 75 (24) | 75 (24) | 74 (23) | 72 (22) | 74 (23) | 70 (21) | 69 (21) | 58 (14) | 52 (11) | 75 (24) |
| Mean daily maximum °F (°C) | 38.2 (3.4) | 40.9 (4.9) | 42.7 (5.9) | 47.7 (8.7) | 52.2 (11.2) | 55.2 (12.9) | 59.6 (15.3) | 63.3 (17.4) | 59.6 (15.3) | 52.2 (11.2) | 44.2 (6.8) | 39 (4) | 49.6 (9.8) |
| Mean daily minimum °F (°C) | 26.8 (−2.9) | 27.5 (−2.5) | 32.7 (0.4) | 33.6 (0.9) | 40.1 (4.5) | 44.3 (6.8) | 48.8 (9.3) | 49.9 (9.9) | 46.3 (7.9) | 38.8 (3.8) | 32 (0) | 30.2 (−1.0) | 37.6 (3.1) |
| Record low °F (°C) | −2 (−19) | 0 (−18) | 19 (−7) | 19 (−7) | 23 (−5) | 34 (1) | 33 (1) | 28 (−2) | 33 (1) | 22 (−6) | 17 (−8) | −5 (−21) | −5 (−21) |
| Average precipitation inches (mm) | 8.45 (215) | 5.97 (152) | 7.23 (184) | 5.82 (148) | 6.5 (170) | 4.33 (110) | 4.93 (125) | 3.43 (87) | 9.12 (232) | 16.58 (421) | 10.45 (265) | 10.41 (264) | 93.2 (2,370) |
| Average snowfall inches (cm) | 7.7 (20) | 9.1 (23) | 3.1 (7.9) | 0.6 (1.5) | 0 (0) | 0 (0) | 0 (0) | 0 (0) | 0 (0) | 0 (0) | 1.5 (3.8) | 1.5 (3.8) | 23.5 (60) |
| Average precipitation days | 19 | 14 | 21 | 15 | 20 | 17 | 16 | 12 | 18 | 24 | 19 | 21 | 216 |
