= Aleut Restitution Act of 1988 =

Reparation settlement

The Aleut Restitution Act of 1988 (also known as the Aleutian and Pribilof Islands Restitution Act) was a reparation settlement passed by the United States Congress in 1988, in response to the internment of Aleut people living in the Aleutian Islands during World War II. On August 10, 1988, it was formally passed with the passage titled Public Law 100-383: "Restitution for World War II Internment of Japanese-Americans and Aleuts". The act did not provide a formal apology, although the Japanese part of the bill did include one. Upon its passing, then President Ronald Reagan gave the formal apology by stating the relocation was done for the Aleuts’ own protection, but acknowledged that property had been lost or damaged during the relocation.

Before the Japanese invasion of Attu and Kiska in 1942, the United States forcibly relocated some 800 Aleuts to camps in Southeast Alaska, where it is estimated that more than 1 in 10 evacuees perished.

== Proposal of the Aleutian and Pribilof Restitution Act (1987) ==
The bill was introduced on January 6, 1987, by Representative Thomas S. Foley (D-WA), along with 166 co-sponsors. It declared the following:

1. The Aleut civilian residents of certain islands who were relocated during World War II remained relocated long after any potential danger had passed.
2. The United States failed to provide reasonable care for the Aleuts, resulting in illness, disease, and death, and failed to protect Aleut personal and community property.
3. The United States has not compensated the Aleuts adequately.
4. There is no remedy for injustices suffered by the Aleuts except an Act of Congress.

Under the new bill, a trust fund was established to be used "for the benefit of the following people and purposes":

1. The elderly, disabled, or seriously ill
2. Students in need of scholarship assistance
3. Preservation of Aleut cultural heritage and historical records
4. The improvement of community centers in affected Aleut villages, and
5. Other purposes to improve Aleut life.

For each eligible Aleut, $12,000 was paid to compensate for any personal property losses sustained during the war.

== Amendment to the Aleutian and Pribilof Restitution Act (1993) ==
On September 14, 1993, an amendment was proposed to the original 1988 Restitution Act, increasing authorization for payments from $1,400,000 to $4,700,000, in order to include church property damaged or lost during the war. The bill was passed by the House of Representatives and the Senate, and the Act was amended on October 5, 1994.

== See also ==
- Outline of United States federal Indian law and policy
