= Winter and Pond =

Photography studio in Alaska, US

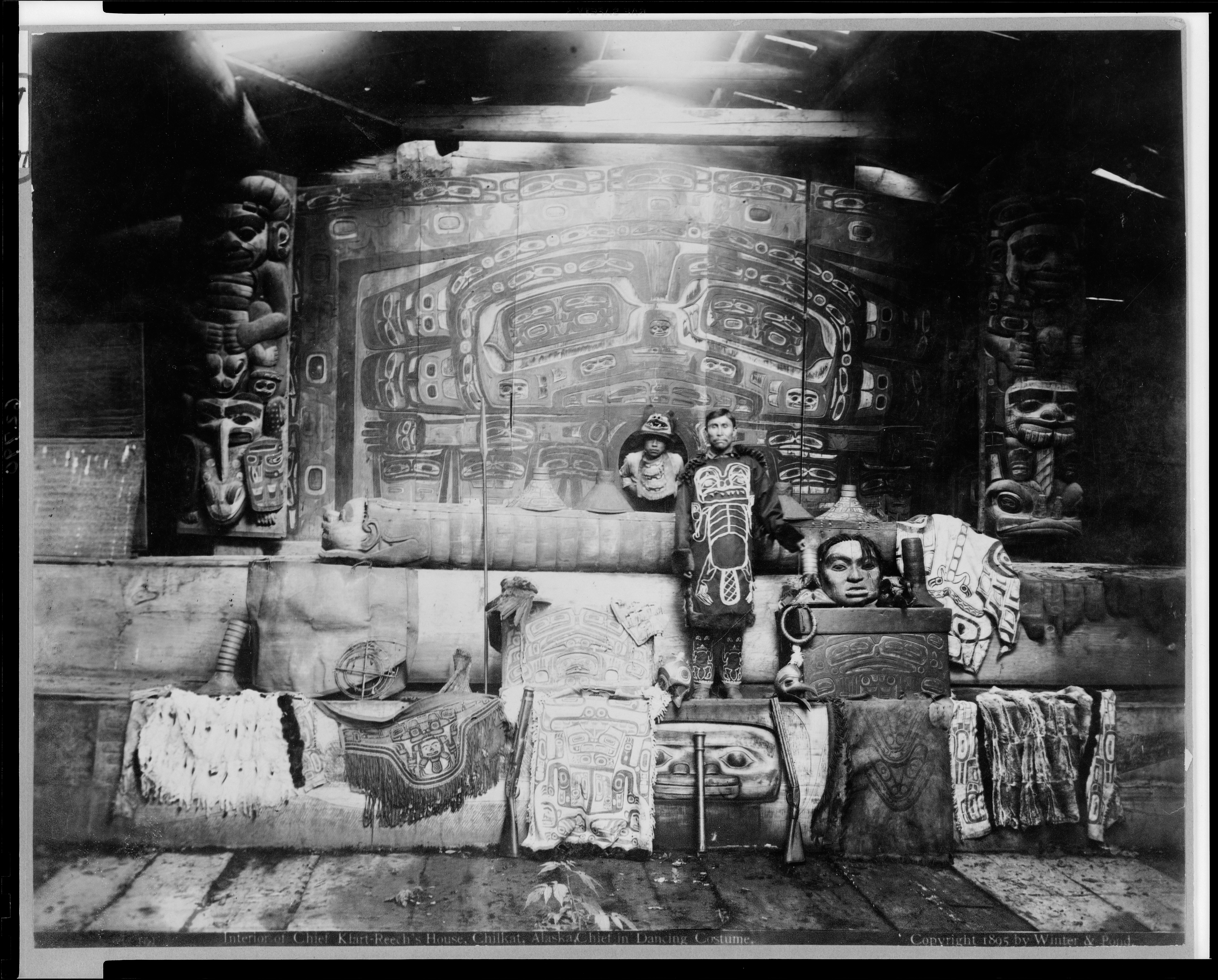
Chief Klart-Reech's home interior

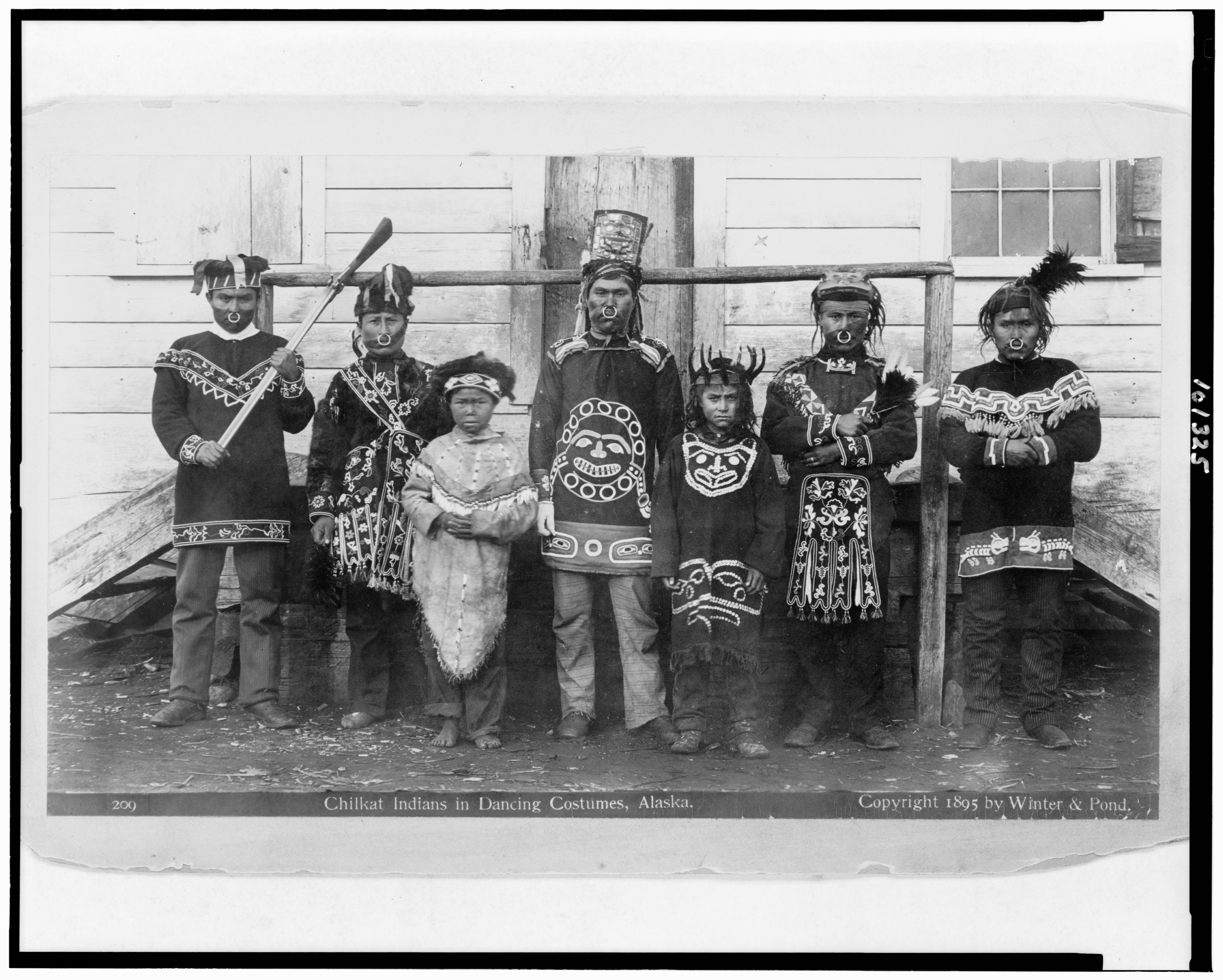
Tlingit in dancing attire

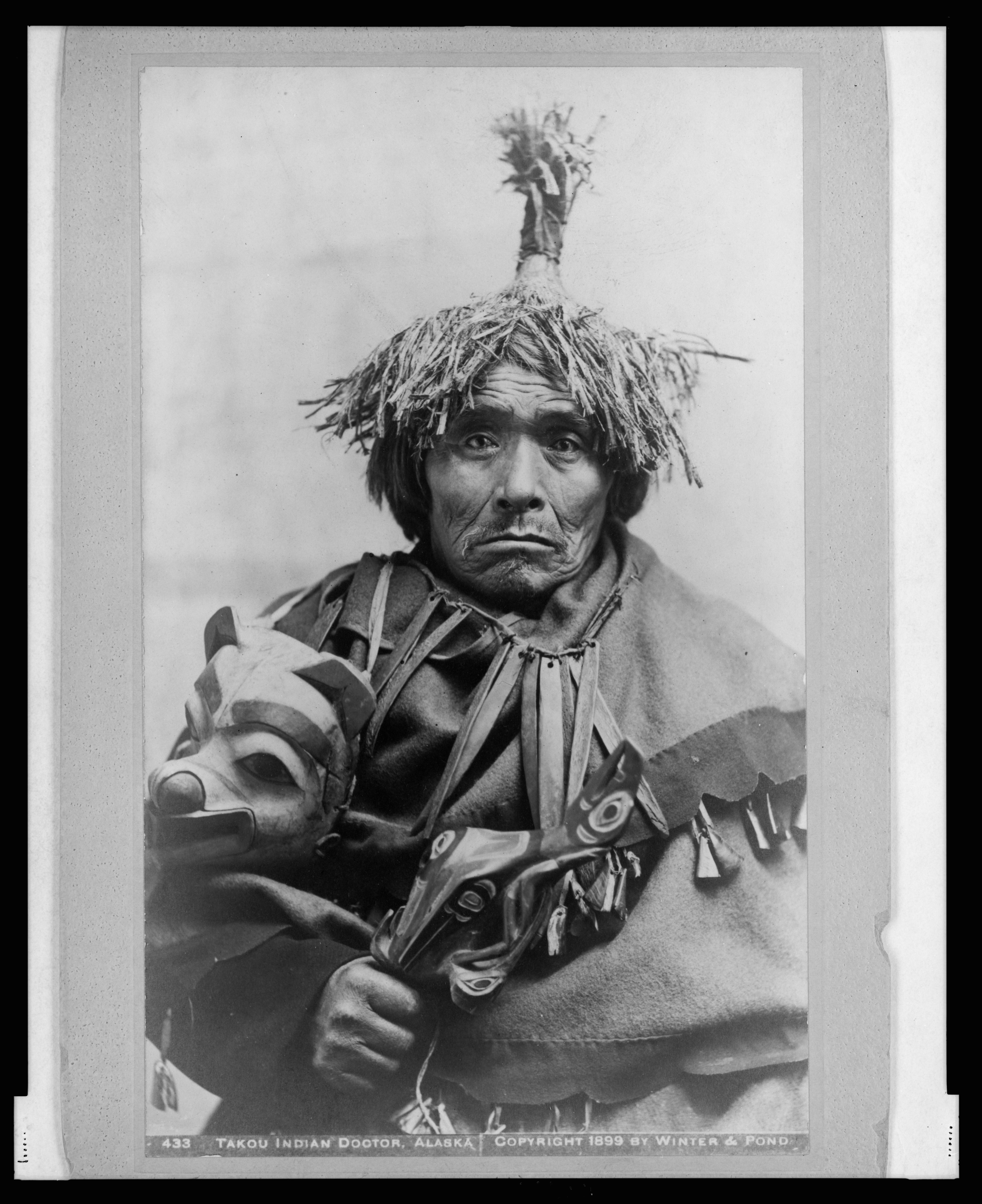
Medicine man

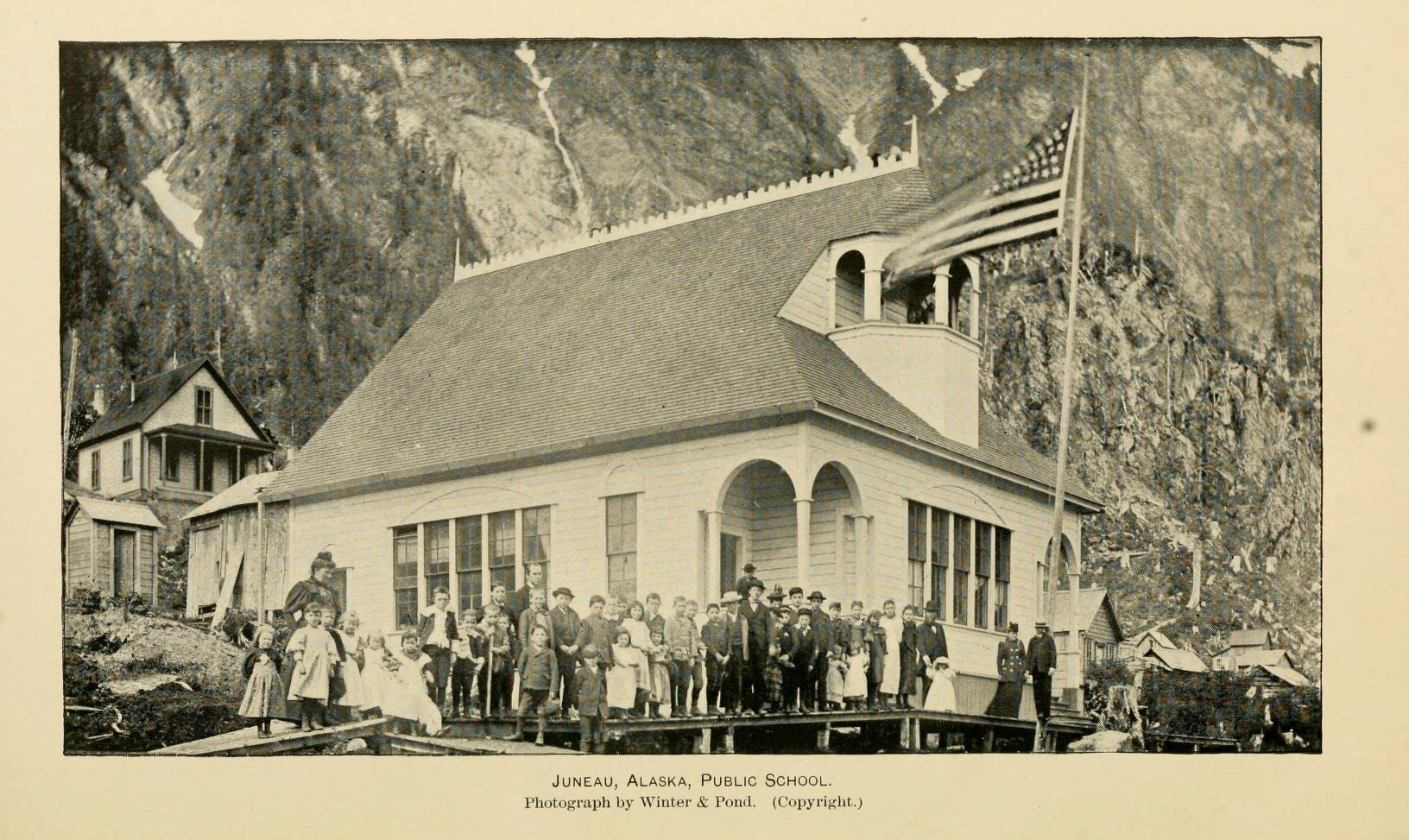
Public School in Juneau

Winter and Pond was a photography studio partnership between Lloyd Valentine Winter (1866–1945) and Edwin Percy Pond (1872–1943) in Alaska. Their work includes scenes of the Klondike Gold Rush, Tlingit, glaciers, vistas, and Juneau. The State of Alaska and Alaska State Libraries have collections of their photographs. The Library of Congress has their panoramic photo of Amalga, Alaska in its collection. Their studio was in business for more than 50 years, and according to the Alaska State Libraries their work provides "a unique reflection of the state in the early 20th century." Pond died in 1943 and Winter passed the business on to Francis Harrison in 1945. Harrison ran Winter & Pond Co. until it closed in 1956.

== History ==
They took over George M. Landerking's business. They were able to visit various areas and islands using a small boat. They copyrighted several of their works.

== Bibliography ==
- The Totems of Alaska, Winter and Pond Co., Juneau, Alaska, 1909.
