= Makushin, Alaska =

Abandoned village in Alaska

Makushin
- Village
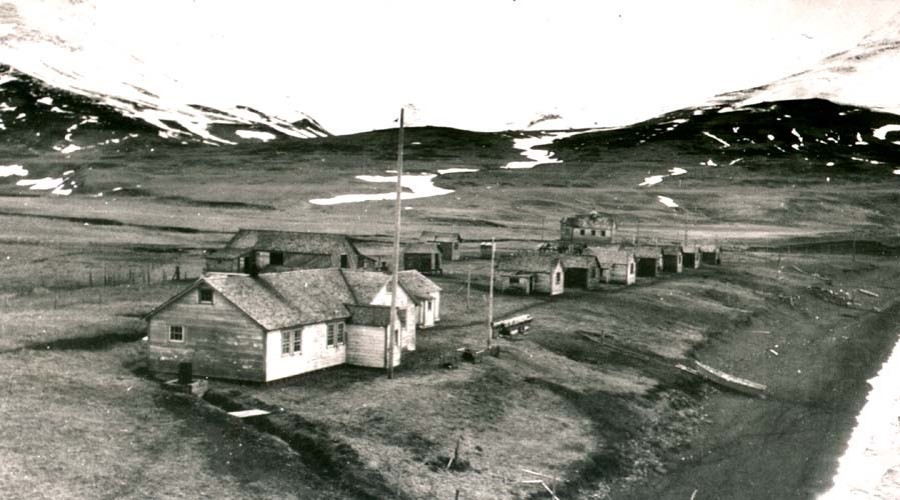
- Makushin before WWII

- Location within Alaska
- Coordinates: 53.76914°N 166.98744°W
- Country: United States
- State: Alaska
- Census Area: Aleutians West
- Time zone: UTC-10:00 (HST)
  - Summer (DST): UTC-9:00 (HDT)

Makushin was an Aleut settlement located on the coast of Unalaska Island at the entrance of Makushin Bay, near Makushin Volcano.

Following the Japanese occupation of Attu and Kiska and the bombing of Dutch Harbor as part of the Aleutian Islands campaign during the Second World War, the US Government decided to evacuate the village of Makushin along with several other villages on the Aleutian and Pribilof Islands, and the villagers were relocated to camps in Southeastern Alaska. The villagers of Makushin were sent to the Ward Lake CCC camp along with the villagers of Akutan, Kashega, Biorka and Nikolski where they suffered considerable hardship and 18% of the villagers at the camp perished during the war. To alleviate the overcrowding, the villagers of Biorka, Kashega and Makushin were moved to the facility at Burnett Inlet in 1944.

Following the war the villagers were brought to Akutan, but were told they could not resettle their villages, most of the villagers then settled into other native communities. Makushin was never re-settled after the war.

Historical population of Makushin
Year	Pop.	±%
1834	35	—
1867	49	+40.0%
1890	51	+4.1%
1897	71	+39.2%
1920	33	−53.5%
1930	31	−6.1%
Source: .
