= Funter Bay =

Coordinates: 58°14′49″N 134°53′41″W

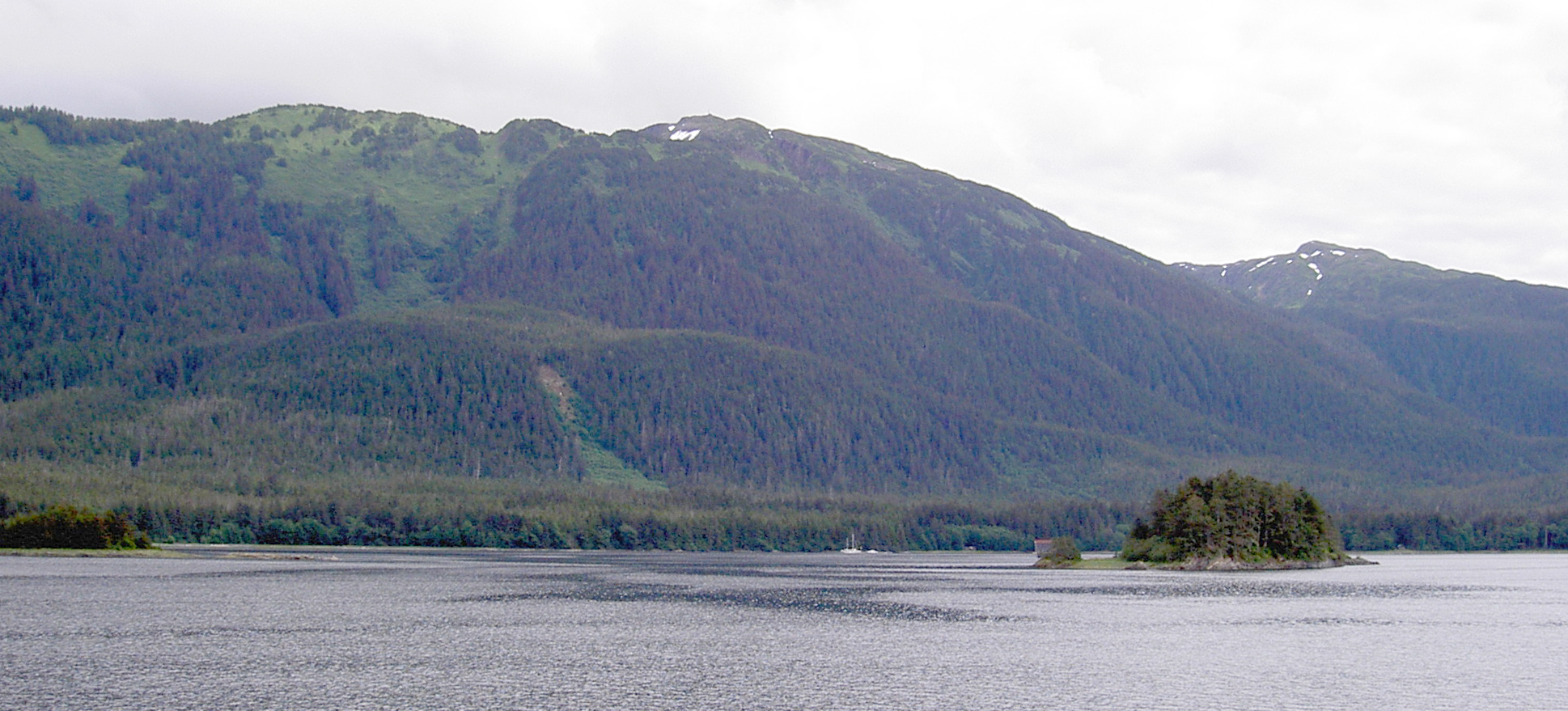
Funter Bay in 2011, seen from the north

Funter Bay is a two-mile-long (3 km) bay on the western side of Admiralty Island near its northern tip, in the Alexander Archipelago of the U.S. state of Alaska. It lies within the Hoonah-Angoon Census Area, in the Unorganized Borough of Alaska. Funter Bay was named in 1883 by William Healey Dall for the maritime fur trader Robert Funter, who explored and mapped parts of the coast in 1788 as captain of the vessel North West America.

Funter Bay was the site of a World War II internment camp for Aleuts relocated 1500 miles from their homes. It was "the site of an abandoned cannery in which the St. Paul evacuees were housed. The St. George camp was across the bay at an old mine site." The injustices they suffered were the subject of the US Congress' Aleut Restitution Act of 1988.

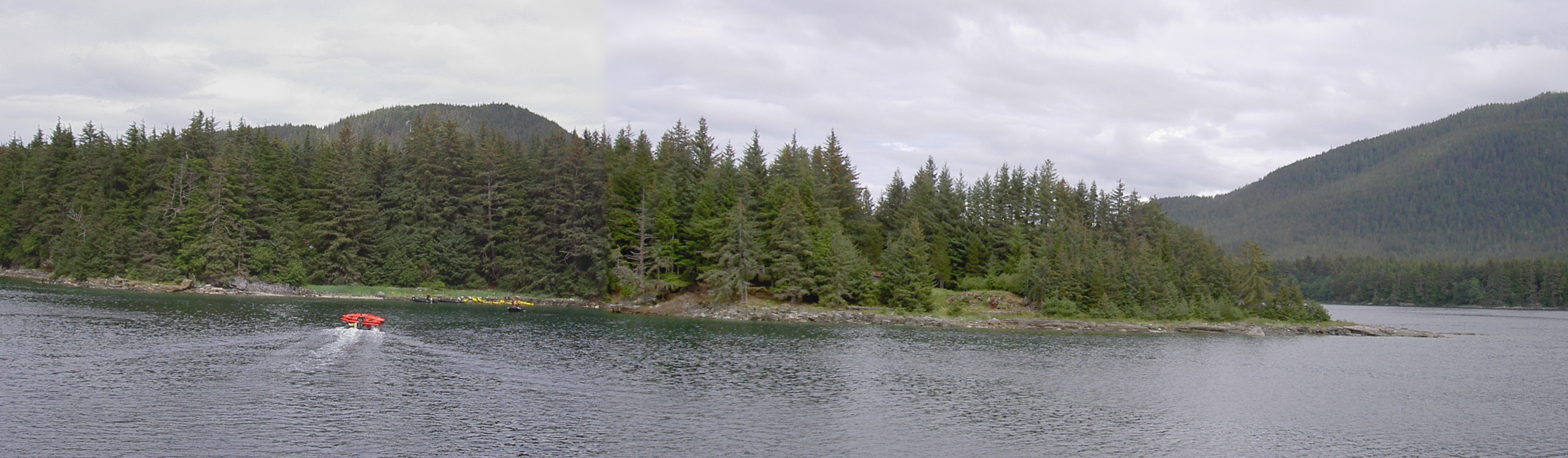
Coot Cove off of Funter Bay

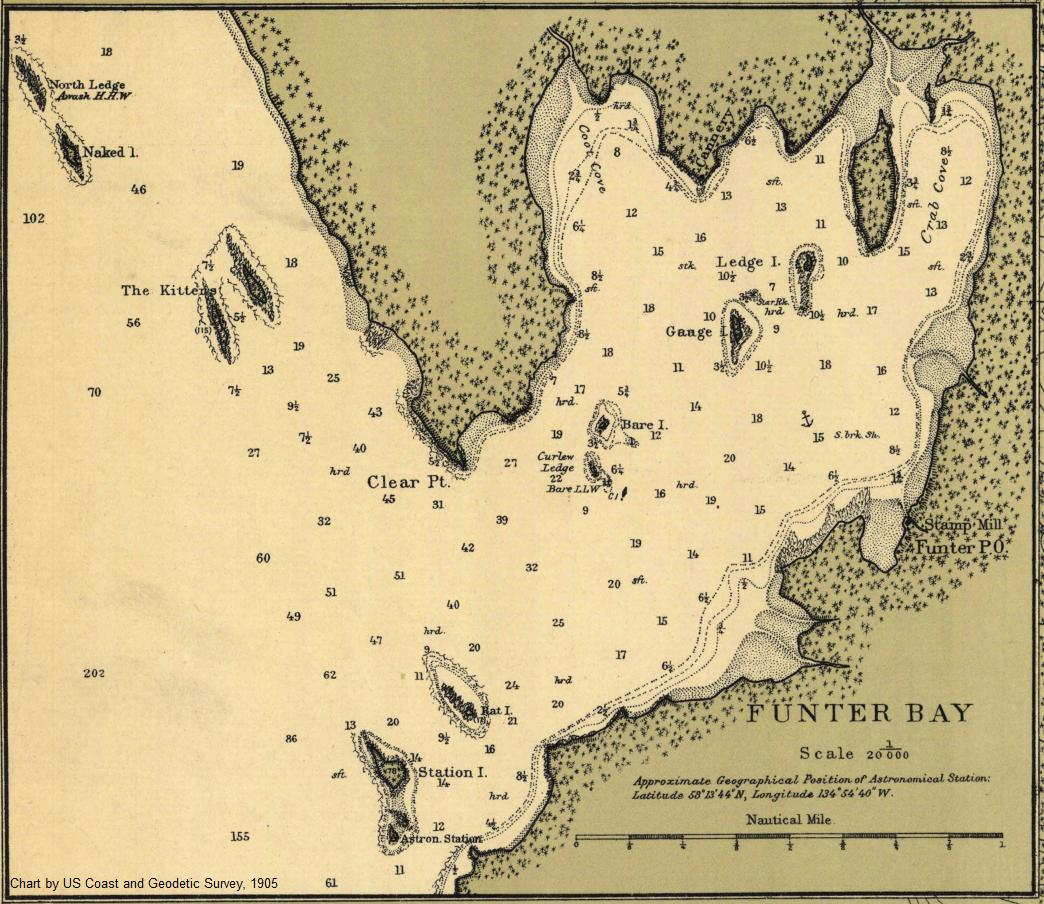
Chart of Funter Bay

== Demographics ==
Historical population
Census	Pop.	Note	%±
1890	25		—
U.S. Decennial Census

Funter Bay appeared on the 1890 U.S. Census as an unincorporated area with 25 residents (described as a mining camp, though a cannery was also located here). Of its residents, 20 were Native Americans (9 males and 11 females) and 5 were White (all male). 15 residents were considered "native", while 10 were considered "foreign." There were 8 houses and 11 families. It has not appeared on the census since.
