= Kashega, Alaska =

Abandoned village in Alaska

Kashega
- Village
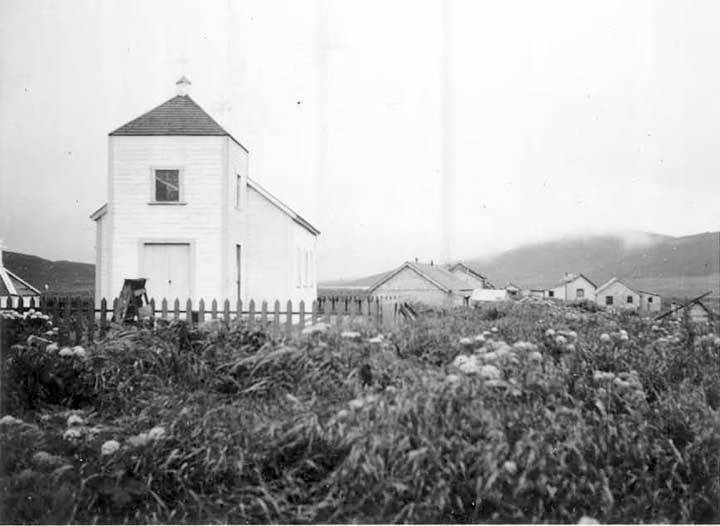

- Location within Alaska
- Coordinates: 53.466184°N 167.162548°W
- Country: United States
- State: Alaska
- Census Area: Aleutians West
- Time zone: UTC-10:00 (HST)
  - Summer (DST): UTC-9:00 (HDT)

Kashega was an Aleut settlement located on the north coast of Unalaska Island, in Kashega Bay. Along with several other villages, Kashega was forcibly evacuated during World War II and permanently abandoned following the war.

== Geography ==
The village of Kashega was located at the southeastern end of Kashega Bay, on the northwestern side of the long westerly extension of Unalaska Island. The anchorage in the bay was exposed to the northwest and disturbed by a kelp-marked 2.25-fathom shoal 250 yards from the shore.

In 1917, when visited by the USCGC McCulloch, Kashega was noted as being "fairly well located and drained," a prosperous village with plentiful salmon, in sharp contrast to the poor sanitation of nearby Makushin. In 1930, when visited by USCGC Unalga, the village was observed to be in good condition, consisting of a church, schoolhouse, and 15 small frame houses. The population at the time was about 38.

== Abandonment ==
Following the Japanese occupation of Attu and Kiska and the bombing of Dutch Harbor as part of the Aleutian Islands campaign during the Second World War, the American military authorities decided to evacuate the village of Makushin along with several other villages on the Aleutian and Pribilof Islands, and the villagers were relocated to camps in Southeastern Alaska. The villagers of Kashega were sent to the Ward Lake CCC camp along with the villagers of Akutan, Makushin, Biorka and Nikolski where they suffered considerable hardship and 18% of the villagers at the camp perished during the war. In 1944, villagers from Kasega were relocated to Burnett Inlet to reduce overcrowding.

Following the war the villagers were brought to Akutan, but were prevented from returning to their original homes and eventually settled into other Native communities. Two of the villagers (George Borenin and Cornelius Kudrin) eventually re-settled in Kashega and attempted to establish a permanent residence, but ill health eventually forced them to leave Kashega. By 1960 Kashega was again abandoned and a priest arranged a visit to collect the chapel's icons, signaling the end of the settlement.

Historical population of Kashega
Year	Pop.	±%
1834	41	—
1867	69	+68.3%
1890	46	−33.3%
1897	52	+13.0%
1920	51	−1.9%
1930	38	−25.5%
