= Amalga, Alaska =

Former town in Alaska, United States

Coordinates: 58°44′30″N 134°46′00″W

Amalga is a former gold-mining town outside of Juneau, Alaska. The area is now part of the Tongass National Forest. The Library of Congress has a photograph of Amalga by Winter & Pond in its collection. The area was once homesteaded and farmed. A horse tram brought goods delivered by steamship to the mine.

Amalga had a post office near the Eagle River Mine. Amalga was established in 1902 and abandoned by 1927.
