= Biorka, Alaska =

Abandoned Village in Alaska

Biorka
- Village
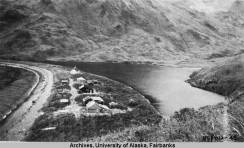

- Location within Alaska
- Coordinates: 53.826932°N 166.207565°W
- Country: United States
- State: Alaska
- Census Area: Aleutians West
- Time zone: UTC-10:00 (HST)
  - Summer (DST): UTC-9:00 (HDT)

Biorka was an Aleut settlement located on Sedanka Island, off the coast of Unalaska Island. with the name Biorka first appearing in the early 19th Century.

Following the Japanese occupation of Attu and Kiska and the bombing of Dutch Harbor as part of the Aleutian Islands campaign during the Second World War, the US Government decided to evacuate the village of Biorka along with several other villages on the Aleutian and Pribilof Islands, and the villagers were relocated to camps in Southeastern Alaska. The villagers of Biorka were sent to the Ward Lake CCC camp along with the villagers of Akutan, Kashega, Makushin and Nikolski where they suffered considerable hardship and 18% of the villagers at the camp perished during the war. To alleviate the overcrowding, the villagers of Biorka, Kashega and Makushin were moved to the facility at Burnett Inlet in 1944.

The villagers were brought back to the Aleutians in 1945. The villages were badly damaged or destroyed during the war due to a combination of Japanese bombing, destruction by US forces to prevent useful assets falling into the hands of advancing Japanese forces or looted. The US government determined that the villages of Biorka, Kashega, Makushin and Attu should not be resettled right away due to the required cost of rebuilding them. Attempts were made to re-settle Biorka through the late 1940s, however dwindling population combined with a violent storm in 1952 that destroyed or damaged most of the remaining houses forced the remaining residents to move to Unalaska.

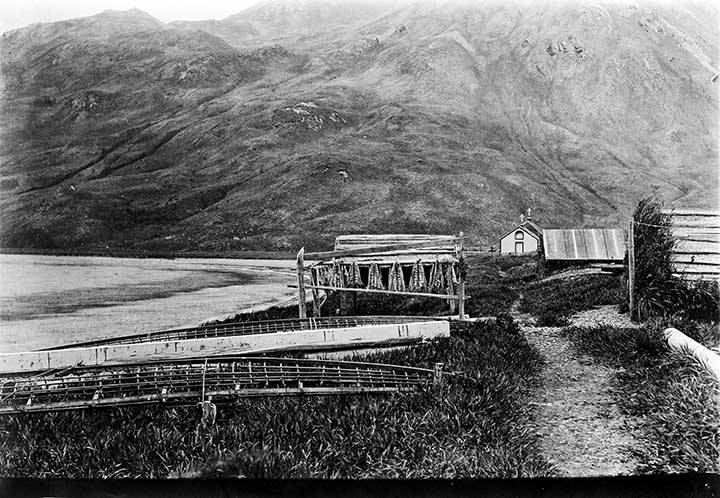
Village of Biorka showing the traditional barabara dwellings and kayaks; and a Greek chapel in the background

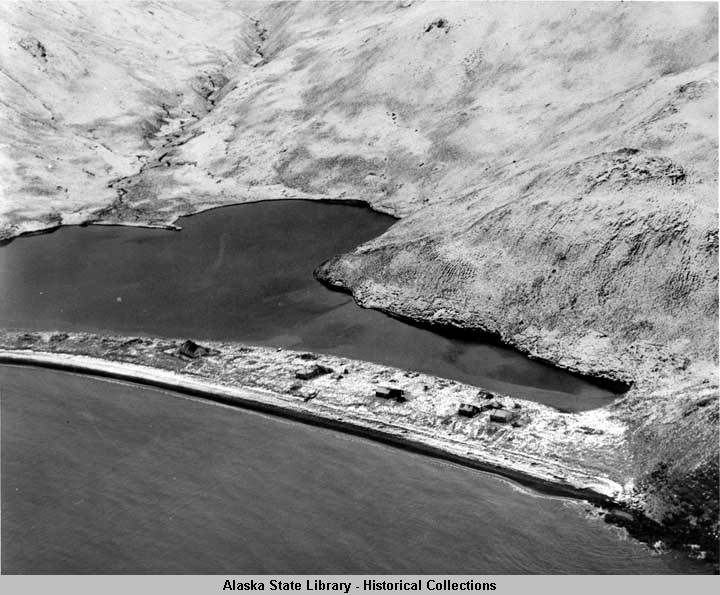
Aerial view of Biorka in the early 1940s

Historical population of Biorka
| Year | Pop. | ±% |
|---|---|---|
| 1834 | 44 | — |
| 1867 | 85 | +93.2% |
| 1890 | 57 | −32.9% |
| 1897 | 48 | −15.8% |
| 1920 | 46 | −4.2% |
| 1930 | 22 | −52.2% |
Source: .
