= Atka =

Atka may refer to:

- Atka, Russia, an urban-type settlement in Magadan Oblast, Russia
- Atka Iceport, an iceport in West Antarctica
- Atka Island, in the Andreanof Islands
  - Atka, Alaska, a city in the United States, on Atka Island
    - Atka Airport, a public airport in Alaska, United States
  - Mount Atka or Korovin Volcano, the highest point of Atka Island
- USCGC Southwind (WAGB-280) (USS Atka (AGB-3)), a United States Coast Guard ice breaker
