= List of national monuments of the United States =

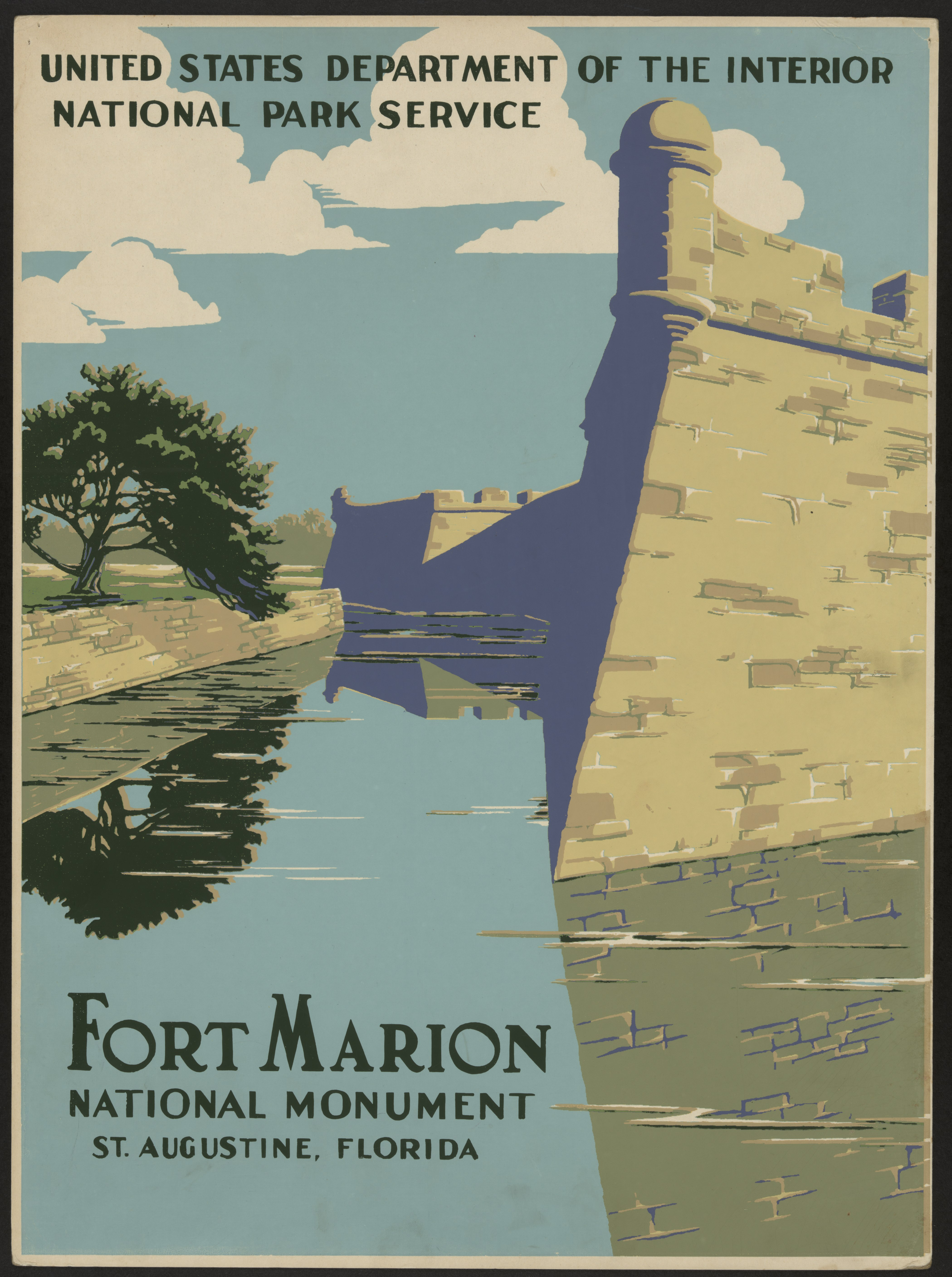
A 1938 Works Progress Administration poster for Fort Marion National Monument, now called Castillo de San Marcos

The United States has 138 protected areas known as national monuments. The president of the United States can establish a national monument by presidential proclamation, and the United States Congress can do so by legislation. The president's authority arises from the Antiquities Act of 1906, which allows the president to proclaim "historic landmarks, historic and prehistoric structures, and other objects of historic or scientific interest" as national monuments.

Concerns about protecting mostly prehistoric Native American ruins and artifacts, collectively known as antiquities, on western federal lands prompted the legislation, which allowed the president to quickly preserve public land without waiting for legislation to pass through an unconcerned Congress. The ultimate goal was to protect all historic and prehistoric sites on U.S. federal lands, and it has resulted in designation of a wide variety of ecological, cultural and historical sites.

President Theodore Roosevelt established the first national monument, Devils Tower in Wyoming, on September 24, 1906. He established 18 national monuments, although only nine still retain that designation. Eighteen presidents have created national monuments under the Antiquities Act since the program began; only Richard Nixon, Ronald Reagan, and George H. W. Bush did not. Bill Clinton created 19 and expanded three others.

Jimmy Carter protected vast parts of Alaska, proclaiming 15 national monuments, 7 of which were later promoted to national parks. President Barack Obama created or expanded 34 national monuments by proclamation, the most of any president, with over half a billion acres of public land and water protected.

National monuments are located in 33 states, Washington, D.C., the Virgin Islands, American Samoa, the Minor Outlying Islands, and the Northern Mariana Islands. California has the most national monuments, with 20, followed by Arizona with 19 and New Mexico with 13. At least seventy-eight national monuments protect places of natural significance, including eighteen primarily for their geological features, eight marine sites, and nine volcanic sites (two of which are designated "National Volcanic Monuments"). At least sixty-six national monuments primarily protect historic sites, including twenty-eight associated with Native Americans, eleven relating to African American history, and eleven forts. Four have been designated World Heritage Sites. With the variety of resource types there is significant variation in the size of national monuments; the median size is roughly 3,500 acres (14 km^{2}). The five largest national monuments are all oceanic marine sites that protect waters and submerged lands where commercial fishing is prohibited; the smallest protects the Oval Office, Cabinet Room, and adjacent rooms in the West Wing of the White House.

Many former national monuments have been redesignated as national parks or another status by Congress, while others have been transferred to state control or disbanded.

== Management by federal agencies ==
Nine federal agencies in five departments manage the 138 current U.S. national monuments. Of these, 121 monuments are managed by a single agency, while 17 are co-managed by two agencies. Three of the NPS's national monuments, Grand Canyon–Parashant, Avi Kwa Ame, and Oval Office, are not official units because they overlap with Lake Mead National Recreation Area and the White House. Management practices vary across agencies and sites according to their missions, the size or type of protected place, and legal authorization. Generally, hunting, fishing, and extraction of resources are prohibited.

Monuments and memorials that were not designated by the U.S. government, such as the USS Maine National Monument, are not listed here.

Agency	Department	Co-managed	Total managed
National Park Service (NPS)	Interior	3 with BLM, 1 with FWS, 1 with Army	89
Bureau of Land Management (BLM)	Interior	3 with NPS, 6 with USFS	31
United States Forest Service (USFS)	Agriculture	6 with BLM	16
Fish and Wildlife Service (FWS)	Interior	5 with NOAA, 1 with NPS, 1 with DOE	9
National Oceanic and Atmospheric Administration (NOAA)	Commerce	5 with FWS	5
Department of Energy (DOE)	Energy	1 with FWS	1
Armed Forces Retirement Home (AFRH)	Defense		1
United States Army	Defense	1 with NPS	2
United States Air Force (USAF)	Defense		1
(duplications)			(17)
Total			138

== List of national monuments ==
Name	Location	Agency	Date established	Area	Visitors (2018)	Description
Admiralty Island	Alaska; 57.64°N 134.35°W	USFS	December 1, 1978	1,019,861 acres (4,127.2 km^{2})		Occupying most of Admiralty Island, the 7th largest in the United States, this monument is part of Tongass National Forest in Southeast Alaska. The monument protects the densest known population of brown bear on Earth, along with habitat for the Sitka black-tailed deer. Most of the monument has been designated as the Kootznoowoo Wilderness, restricting future development.
African Burial Ground	New York; 40.7144°N 74.0042°W	NPS	February 27, 2006	0.35 acres (0.001 km^{2})	45,035	Re-discovered in 1991 during excavations for a new federal building, this former burial ground that contains the remains of more than 400 free and enslaved Africans buried during the 17th and 18th centuries was designated a National Historic Landmark memorial in 1993.
Agate Fossil Beds	Nebraska; 42.416°N 103.728°W	NPS	June 14, 1997	3,057.87 acres (12.4 km^{2})	16,238	The valley of the Niobrara River is known for its large number of well-preserved Miocene mammal fossils which date from about 20 million years ago.
Agua Fria	Arizona; 34.15°N 112.08°W	BLM	January 11, 2000	70,980 acres (287.2 km^{2})		Located around the canyon of the Agua Fria River, it contains more than 450 distinct Native American structures, including large pueblos with more than 100 rooms.
Aleutian Islands World War II	Alaska; 52.87°N 173.16°W	FWS	December 5, 2008	4,950 acres (20.0 km^{2})		During World War II Japan briefly occupied Attu Island and Kiska Island in the Aleutian chain. The monument within the Alaska Maritime National Wildlife Refuge includes the site of the 19-day battle to reclaim Attu, artifacts of the occupation at Kiska, and the crash site of a U.S. B-24D Liberator on Atka Island. Originally designated as part of World War II Valor in the Pacific National Monument, which was divided and renamed March 12, 2019.
Alibates Flint Quarries	Texas; 35.57°N 101.67°W	NPS	August 21, 1965	1,370.97 acres (5.5 km^{2})	7,415	Alibates was the quarry site for high-quality, rainbow-hued flint that was distributed throughout the Great Plains in pre-Columbian times. It is jointly operated with the Lake Meredith National Recreation Area and includes the ruins of several Plains Village Indian dwellings.
Aniakchak	Alaska; 56.9°N 158.15°W	NPS	December 1, 1978	137,176 acres (555.1 km^{2})	100	Mount Aniakchak, which erupted 3,500 years ago, and the surrounding region make up one of the least visited NPS sites. Surprise Lake, within the volcano's 6-mile (9.7 km) wide, 2,500-foot (760 m) deep caldera, is the source of the Aniakchak River.
Avi Kwa Ame	Nevada; 35.4°N 115.00°W	BLM, NPS	March 21, 2023	506,814 acres (2,051.0 km^{2})		Spirit Mountain (Avi Kwa Ame) is the site of creation for the Yuman tribes, who hold the area sacred. Consisting of the Eldorado Valley, Piute Valley, and surrounding mountain ranges of the Mojave Desert, the area is home to expansive Joshua tree forests and provides important habitat for species such as the desert bighorn sheep, desert tortoise and Gila monster.
Aztec Ruins	New Mexico; 36.83°N 107.00°W	NPS	January 24, 1923	318.4 acres (1.3 km^{2})	54,933	The ruins contain Pueblo structures from the 11th to 13th centuries with more than 400 masonry rooms which were misidentified by early American settlers as Aztec. It has been included in the Chaco Culture World Heritage Site, which also includes Chaco Culture National Historical Park.
Baaj Nwaavjo I'tah Kukveni – Ancestral Footprints of the Grand Canyon	Arizona; 35.54°N 112°W	BLM, USFS	August 8, 2023	917,618 acres (3,713.5 km^{2})		This monument protects land on both sides of Grand Canyon National Park that is significant to several tribal nations. Includes part of Kaibab National Forest
Bandelier	New Mexico; 35.78°N 106.27°W	NPS	February 11, 1916	33,676.67 acres (136.3 km^{2})	198,441	Frijoles Canyon contains Ancestral Pueblo homes, kivas, rock paintings and petroglyphs. The Pueblo structures made of volcanic tuff date to 1150 AD, with other artifacts more than 11,000 years old.
Basin and Range	Nevada; 37.9°N 115.4°W	BLM	July 10, 2015	703,585 acres (2,847.3 km^{2})		The remote Mount Irish, Seaman, and Golden Gate Ranges surround the Garden and Coal Valleys and White River Narrows and are home to many desert species and 4,000-year-old rock art.
Bears Ears	Utah; 37.63°N 109.86°W	BLM, USFS	December 28, 2016	1,360,000 acres (5,503.7 km^{2})		The Bears Ears are a pair of buttes that rise above sandstone canyons and mesas. Other points of geologic interest include the twin Six Shooter dome-shaped peaks, striated sandstone pinnacles, and natural arches. The wider region has tens of thousands of archaeological sites including rock art, ancient cliff dwellings, and ceremonial kivas. Part is in Manti–La Sal National Forest
Belmont–Paul Women's Equality	District of Columbia; 38.89°N 77.00°W	NPS	April 12, 2016	0.34 acres (0.001 km^{2})	9,081	Home of the National Woman's Party since 1929, this Adam Federal style house near the U.S. Capitol was the home where party leader Alice Paul and others lived and worked.
Berryessa Snow Mountain	California; 39.22°N 122.77°W	USFS, BLM	July 10, 2015	344,476 acres (1,394.0 km^{2})		Less than 100 miles (160 km) from the San Francisco Bay Area, Berryessa Snow Mountain protects part of the California Coast Range, one of the most biodiverse regions in the state, home to elk, osprey, river otters, half the state's dragonfly species, and California's second-largest population of wintering bald eagles. Part is in Mendocino National Forest.
Birmingham Civil Rights	Alabama; 33.513°N 86.815°W	NPS	January 12, 2017	0.88 acres (0.004 km^{2})		This site preserves the A. G. Gaston Motel, which was bombed by the KKK after Martin Luther King Jr. and Birmingham campaign leaders had stayed there, inciting the Birmingham riot of 1963.
Booker T. Washington	Virginia; 37.123°N 79.766°W	NPS	April 2, 1956	239.01 acres (1.0 km^{2})	22,732	This preserves portions of the 207-acre (0.84 km^{2}) tobacco farm on which educator and civil rights leader Booker T. Washington was born into slavery on April 5, 1856. The site contains replicas of the house Washington was born in, a smokehouse, a blacksmith shed, a tobacco barn, and a horse barn.
Browns Canyon	Colorado; 38.615°N 106.059°W	BLM, USFS	February 19, 2015	21,604 acres (87.4 km^{2})		Steep granite cliffs and colorful rock outcroppings overlook the Arkansas River, where visitors can go whitewater rafting. Prehistoric campsites and shelters date back 11,000 years, while sites from gold mining remain from the late 1800s. About half is in San Isabel National Forest.
Buck Island Reef	US Virgin Islands; 17.79°N 64.62°W	NPS	December 28, 1961	19,015.47 acres (77.0 km^{2})	31,411	Most of this monument is underwater, containing a large elkhorn coral barrier reef that provides cover for a great variety of reef fish, sea turtles and least terns. It is based around Buck Island, an uninhabited 176-acre (0.71 km^{2}) island.
Cabrillo	California; 32.67°N 117.24°W	NPS	October 14, 1913	159.94 acres (0.6 km^{2})	842,104	This monument commemorates the landing of Juan Rodríguez Cabrillo at San Diego Bay on September 28, 1542, which was the first European expedition to what later became the West Coast of the U.S. The monument includes a statue of Cabrillo, a rocky intertidal zone, and 20th-century coastal artillery batteries built to protect the harbor of San Diego from enemy warships.
California Coastal	California; 36.89°N 122.18°W	BLM	January 11, 2000	2,628 acres (10.6 km^{2})		This monument ensures the protection of all of the more than 20,000 islets, reefs and rock outcroppings from the coast of California to a distance of 12 nautical miles (22 km), along the entire 840-mile (1,350 km) long California coastline.
Camp Hale — Continental Divide	Colorado; 39.44°N 106.37°W	USFS	October 12, 2022	53,804 acres (217.7 km^{2})		Soldiers in the U.S. Army's 10th Mountain Division used Camp Hale to learn skiing, climbing, and snowshoeing to fight in the Italian Alps during World War II. Part of White River National Forest.
Camp Nelson	Kentucky; 37.78°N 84.60°W	NPS	October 26, 2018	373 acres (1.5 km^{2})		Established in 1863 as a depot for the Union Army during the Civil War, Camp Nelson became a large recruitment center for African American Union soldiers: a key site of emancipation for those soldiers and a refugee camp for their families.
Canyon de Chelly	Arizona; 36.13°N 109.47°W	NPS	April 1, 1931	83,840 acres (339.3 km^{2})	439,306	Located within the Navajo Nation, it preserves the valleys and rims of Canyon de Chelly, Canyon del Muerto, and Monument Canyon. Several Ancestral Puebloan cliff dwellings are built into the canyon walls.
Canyons of the Ancients	Colorado; 37.37°N 109°W	BLM	June 9, 2000	176,370 acres (713.7 km^{2})		Surrounding Hovenweep National Monument, it preserves and protects more than 6,000 archeological sites, the largest concentration in the U.S. These include Lowry Pueblo, dating to 1103 AD, and Painted Hand Pueblo built by the Ancestral Puebloans
Cape Krusenstern	Alaska; 67.41°N 163.50°W	NPS	December 1, 1978	649,096.15 acres (2,626.8 km^{2})	15,087	Co-located with the NHLD Cape Krusenstern Archeological District, this coastal plain contains large lagoons and rolling hills of limestone. The bluffs record thousands of years of change in the shorelines of the Chukchi Sea, as well as evidence of some 9,000 years of human habitation.
Capulin Volcano	New Mexico; 36.79°N 103.96°W	NPS	August 9, 1916	792.84 acres (3.2 km^{2})	67,411	Capulin is an extinct cinder cone volcano that is approximately 59,000 years old and part of the Raton-Clayton Volcanic Field. The crater is 400 feet (120 m) deep and its rim is more than 1,500 feet (460 m) in diameter.
Carlisle Federal Indian Boarding School	Pennsylvania; 40.21°N 77.18°W	NPS, Army	December 9, 2024	24.5 acres (0.1 km^{2})		The United States Indian Industrial School (better known as the Carlisle Indian Industrial School) was the flagship Indian boarding school in the United States from its founding in 1879 through 1918, serving as an important symbol of efforts to culturally assimilate Native Americans by the federal government.
Carrizo Plain	California; 35.16°N 119.75°W	BLM	January 12, 2001	211,045 acres (854.1 km^{2})		Carrizo Plain is the largest single native grassland remaining in California. It contains part of the San Andreas Fault and is surrounded by the Temblor Range and the Caliente Range. At the center of the plain is Soda Lake, which is near Painted Rock.
Casa Grande Ruins	Arizona; 32.99°N 111.54°W	NPS	August 3, 1918	472.5 acres (1.9 km^{2})	62,995	This monument preserves a group of structures surrounded by a compound wall in the Gila Valley that were built in the early 13th century. They were inhabited by the Hohokam people until they were abandoned in the mid-15th century.
Cascade–Siskiyou	Oregon, California; 42.08°N 122.46°W	BLM	June 9, 2000	114,000 acres (461.3 km^{2})		One of the most diverse ecosystems found in the Cascade Range, it has more than 100 dwelling and root-gathering sites belonging to the Modoc, Klamath, and Shasta tribes.
Castillo de San Marcos	Florida; 29.898°N 81.311°W	NPS	October 15, 1924	19.38 acres (0.1 km^{2})	748,058	This Spanish fort near St. Augustine, called Fort Marion when first protected, served for 205 years under four different flags. Built in 1672, it was involved in sieges with the British while under Spanish command, the American Revolution under Britain, the Civil War under the Confederacy, and the Seminole Wars and the Spanish–American War under the United States.
Castle Clinton	New York; 40.7036°N 74.0169°W	NPS	August 12, 1946	1 acre (0.004 km^{2})	4,533,564	A circular sandstone fort built in 1811 at the southern tip of Manhattan to protect New York City from the British, Castle Clinton is now located in Battery Park. It later became a beer garden, a theater, the first immigration station (predating Ellis Island), a public aquarium, and a ticket office for the Statue of Liberty National Monument.
Castle Mountains	California; 35.25°N 115.11°W	NPS	February 12, 2016	21,025.5 acres (85.1 km^{2})		The Castle Mountains sit in the Mojave Desert between the Nevada state line and Mojave National Preserve. It protects desert grasslands home to Joshua tree forests, wildlife including golden eagles and bighorn sheep, and historic Native American sites.
Castner Range	Texas; 31.9°N 106.5°W	Army	March 21, 2023	6,672 acres (27.0 km^{2})		This portion of the Franklin Mountains of west Texas's Chihuahuan Desert includes 41 archaeological sites that show evidence of human presence dating to 6000 BC. The site was used as a weapons testing range for Fort Bliss for 40 years and is still undergoing remediation of munitions. Castner Range is the only land conservation national monument within the Department of Defense.
Cedar Breaks	Utah; 37.63°N 112.85°W	NPS	August 22, 1933	6,154.6 acres (24.9 km^{2})	644,515	A natural amphitheater canyon similar to formations at Bryce Canyon National Park, it stretches over 3 miles (4.8 km) and is more than 2,000 feet (610 m) deep.
César E. Chávez	California; 35.2273°N 118.5614°W	NPS	October 8, 2012	116.56 acres (0.5 km^{2})	12,769	This monument commemorates the life and work of labor leader and civil rights activist Cesar Chavez. Called La Paz, the site was Chavez's home for about 20 years, and his gravesite is on the premises. It is also the location of the headquarters of United Farm Workers, which was founded by Chavez.
Charles Young Buffalo Soldiers	Ohio; 39.7072°N 83.8903°W	NPS	March 25, 2013	59.66 acres (0.2 km^{2})	31,448	Charles Young was the first African American to reach the rank of colonel in the U.S. Army. He was also the first national park superintendent, of Sequoia and General Grant National Parks, and a professor at Wilberforce University. His home at Wilberforce is a museum commemorating his life.
Chimney Rock	Colorado; 37.1917°N 107.3064°W	USFS	September 21, 2012	4,724 acres (19.1 km^{2})		The jewel of San Juan National Forest, the site was once home to the ancestors of the modern Pueblos. Roughly 1,000 years ago, the Ancestral Pueblo People built more than 200 homes and ceremonial buildings high above the valley floor.
Chuckwalla	California; 33.6°N 115.3°W	BLM	January 14, 2025	624,270 acres (2,526.3 km^{2})		A sweeping desert landscape in Southern California where the Mojave, Sonoran, and Colorado deserts converge, preserving jagged canyon ranges, ancient tribal trails and rock art, WWII military-training sites, rare desert tortoises and bighorn sheep, and dramatic geology.
Colorado	Colorado; 39.04°N 108.69°W	NPS	May 24, 1911	20,536.39 acres (83.1 km^{2})	375,467	Monument Canyon runs the width of the park and includes rock formations formed by erosion. The monument covers semi-desert land high on the Colorado Plateau and has a wide range of wildlife including pinyon pines, juniper trees, ravens, jays, desert bighorn sheep, and coyotes as well as a range of recreational activities.
Craters of the Moon	Idaho; 43.42°N 113.52°W	NPS, BLM	May 2, 1924	343,000 acres (1,388.1 km^{2})	263,506	One of the best preserved flood basalt areas in the continental U.S. contains three lava fields along the Great Rift of Idaho. Among the volcanic cinder cones, lava tubes, and fissures created 15,000 to 2,000 years ago is the world's deepest open rift crack. The adjoining National Preserve protects an additional 410,000 acres.
Devils Postpile	California; 37.50°N 119.08°W	NPS	July 6, 1911	800.19 acres (3.2 km^{2})	139,724	Once part of Yosemite National Park, this monument is a dark cliff of columnar basalt created by a lava flow at least 100,000 years ago. It also has the 101-foot-high (31 m) Rainbow Falls.
Devils Tower	Wyoming; 44.59°N 104.72°W	NPS	September 24, 1906	1,347.21 acres (5.5 km^{2})	468,216	The tower is a monolithic igneous intrusion of volcanic neck rising dramatically 1,267 feet (386 m) above the surrounding terrain. Proclaimed by Theodore Roosevelt, this was the first national monument.
Dinosaur	Colorado, Utah; 40.53°N 108.98°W	NPS	October 4, 1915	210,281.92 acres (851.0 km^{2})	304,468	This sandstone and conglomerate bed at the confluence of the Green and Yampa Rivers was formed in the Jurassic Period and contains fossils of dinosaurs including Allosaurus and various long-neck and long-tail sauropods.
Effigy Mounds	Iowa; 43.09°N 91.19°W	NPS	October 25, 1949	2,526.39 acres (10.2 km^{2})	55,576	This monument preserves three prehistoric sites with 206 prehistoric mounds, notable for 31 unusual mounds in the shape of mammals, birds, or reptiles.
El Malpais	New Mexico; 34.88°N 108.05°W	NPS	December 31, 1987	114,347.11 acres (462.7 km^{2})	154,368	An extremely rough, rugged lava flow covers much of the park, filling a large basin rimmed by higher sandstone that forms large, wind-carved bluffs. It has lava tube caves that stretch over 17 miles (27 km) and the Cebolla Wilderness, a forested rimrock area that features prehistoric rock art and the Zuni-Acoma Trail, an ancient Pueblo trade route.
El Morro	New Mexico; 35.04°N 108.35°W	NPS	December 8, 1906	1,278.72 acres (5.2 km^{2})	65,453	On the site of an ancient east–west trail is a great sandstone promontory with a pool of water at its base. There are inscriptions from the 17th century as well as older petroglyphs made by the Ancestral Puebloans.
Emmett Till and Mamie Till-Mobley	Illinois; Mississippi; 33.86°N 90.27°W	NPS	July 25, 2023	5.7 acres (0.0 km^{2})		Three sites honor the memory of Emmett Till, an African American boy who was abducted, tortured, and lynched in Mississippi in 1955 at the age of 14, after being accused of offending a white woman, Carolyn Bryant, in her family's grocery store. The Roberts Temple Church of God in Christ, Bronzeville, Chicago, Illinois, was the site of Till's memorial service in September 1955, hosted by his mother Mamie Till. Graball Landing on the Tallahatchie River in Mississippi is believed to be where Till's body was retrieved from the river and the Tallahatchie County Second District Courthouse in Sumner was where the trial of and acquittal of Roy Bryant and J. W. Milam for Till's murder took place.
Florissant Fossil Beds	Colorado; 38.92°N 105.27°W	NPS	August 20, 1969	6,300 acres (25.5 km^{2})	79,568	Huge petrified redwoods and incredibly detailed fossils of ancient insects and plants reveal a very different landscape in Colorado of almost 35 million years ago in the Eocene age.
Fort Frederica	Georgia; 31.224°N 81.393°W	NPS	May 26, 1936	305 acres (1.2 km^{2})	183,591	Built by James Oglethorpe between 1736 and 1748, these remnants of a fort and town protected the southern boundary of the British colony of Georgia from Spanish raids. It was a few miles from the site of the Battle of Bloody Marsh.
Fort Matanzas	Florida; 29.715°N 81.239°W	NPS	October 15, 1924	300.11 acres (1.2 km^{2})	608,103	This 1740 Spanish fort guarded Matanzas Inlet, the southern mouth of the Matanzas River, which allowed access to St. Augustine. The monument is managed in conjunction with Castillo de San Marcos National Monument and also protects 100 acres (0.40 km^{2}) of salt marsh and barrier islands.
Fort McHenry	Maryland; 39.263°N 76.579°W	NPS	March 3, 1925	43.26 acres (0.2 km^{2})	486,113	The only place designated a national monument and historic shrine, Fort McHenry is a star-shaped fort best known for its role in the War of 1812 when it successfully defended Baltimore Harbor from an attack by the British navy. The events inspired Francis Scott Key to write "The Star-Spangled Banner".
Fort Monroe	Virginia; 37.004°N 76.308°W	NPS	November 1, 2011	367.12 acres (1.5 km^{2})		The six-sided star fort spans the American story from the 17th to the 21st centuries: Captain John Smith's journeys, a haven of freedom for the enslaved during the Civil War, and a bastion of defense for the Chesapeake Bay.
Fort Ord	California; 36.639167°N 121.735278°W	BLM	April 20, 2012	14,658 acres (59.3 km^{2})		Fort Ord was an Army post from 1917 to 1994. It now has recreational trails and various wildlife in grassland, chaparral, and woodland ecosystems.
Fort Pulaski	Georgia; 32.027°N 80.890°W	NPS	October 15, 1924	5,623.1 acres (22.8 km^{2})	419,930	In 1862 during the American Civil War, the Union Army successfully tested a rifled cannon against the defending Confederates, rendering brick fortifications obsolete. Fort Pulaski was also used as a prisoner-of-war camp during the war. The national monument includes most of Cockspur Island (containing the fort) and all of adjacent McQueens Island.
Fort Stanwix	New York; 43.218°N 75.459°W	NPS	August 21, 1935	15.52 acres (0.1 km^{2})	90,507	Fort Stanwix guarded a strategic 18th century portage known as the Oneida Carrying Place. It was built during the French and Indian War (1754–1763). The fort successfully resisted the 1777 siege by a British invasion army during the Saratoga campaign of the American Revolutionary War. Erased by the development of Rome, New York, it was rebuilt as a national monument in the late 1970s.
Fort Union	New Mexico; 35.925°N 105.009°W	NPS	April 5, 1956	720.6 acres (2.9 km^{2})	10,860	A frontier military post and supply depot in the late 19th century, it sat at the intersection of the Mountain and Cimarron Branches of the old Santa Fe Trail.
Fossil Butte	Wyoming; 41.86°N 110.77°W	NPS	October 23, 1972	8,198 acres (33.2 km^{2})	21,349	Fossil Butte preserves the 50-million-year-old Green River lake beds, the best paleontological record of tertiary aquatic communities in North America. Fossils including fish, alligators, bats, turtles, dog-sized horses, insects, and many other species of plants and animals suggest that the region was a low, subtropical, freshwater basin when the sediments accumulated, over about a 2-million-year period.
Frances Perkins	Maine; 44.005°N 69.556°W	NPS	December 16, 2024	57 acres (0.23 km^{2})		Frances Perkins became the first female cabinet member when appointed Secretary of Labor in 1933. Serving until 1945, Perkins remains the longest-serving Secretary of Labor and longest-serving female cabinet member in United States history. Perkins lived at the site as a child as well as intermittently throughout her life.
Freedom Riders	Alabama; 33.658°N 85.831°W	NPS	January 12, 2017	5.96 acres (0.02 km^{2})		Preserves two sites in and near Anniston, Alabama during the civil rights movement—a former Greyhound bus station in the town where Freedom Riders were attacked by a racist mob and the site outside town where their bus was burned.
George Washington Birthplace	Virginia; 38.1861°N 76.9305°W	NPS	January 23, 1930	653.18 acres (2.6 km^{2})	111,058	Representative of 18th-century Virginia tobacco farms, this site is the birthplace and boyhood environment of George Washington. The entrance includes a Memorial Shaft obelisk of Vermont marble that is a one-tenth scale replica of the Washington Monument in Washington, D.C. Also within the monument are the historic birthplace home area, a kitchen house, and the Washington family burial ground.
George Washington Carver	Missouri; 36.986°N 94.354°W	NPS	July 14, 1943	210 acres (0.8 km^{2})	44,411	The site preserves Moses Carver's farm, which was the boyhood home of George Washington Carver, a scientist and educator who developed many uses for peanuts. It was the first national monument dedicated to an African American and first to a non-president.
Giant Sequoia	California; 36.04°N 118.50°W	USFS	April 15, 2000	352,626 acres (1,427.0 km^{2})		The monument includes 38 of the 39 giant sequoia groves in the Sequoia National Forest, amounting to about half of the sequoia groves currently in existence. This includes one of the ten largest giant sequoias, the Boole Tree. Its two parts are around Kings Canyon and Sequoia National Parks in Sequoia National Forest.
Gila Cliff Dwellings	New Mexico; 33.24°N 108.28°W	NPS	November 16, 1907	533.13 acres (2.2 km^{2})	79,108	Located within the Gila Wilderness, the people of the Mogollon culture lived in these cliff dwellings 180 feet (55 m) above the canyon floor from the 1280s through the early 14th century. They lived in five caves with 46 rooms.
Gold Butte	Nevada; 36.281°N 114.201°W	BLM	December 28, 2016	296,937 acres (1,201.7 km^{2})		This Mojave Desert landscape of dramatic red sandstone and canyons has forested mountains, ancient rock art, rock shelters, and a mining ghost town. It is an important habitat of the Mojave Desert tortoise.
Governors Island	New York; 40.691°N 74.016°W	NPS	January 19, 2001	22.91 acres (0.1 km^{2})	589,798	From 1783 to 1966, Governors Island in New York Harbor was an Army post, and from 1966 to 1996 it was a Coast Guard installation. Located on Governors Island are Castle Williams and Fort Jay, which served as outposts to protect New York City from sea attack.
Grand Canyon–Parashant	Arizona; 36.4°N 113.7°W	BLM, NPS	January 11, 2000	1,021,030 acres (4,132.0 km^{2})		Located on the northern rim of the Grand Canyon on the Shivwits Plateau, this diverse landscape includes geologic resources including millennia of eroded formations forming canyons, cliffs and buttes; abundant fossils of ancient marine invertebrates; and desert volcanic peaks. Archaeological sites preserve artifacts of the Ancestral Puebloans, while abandoned ranches and mills were left behind by early pioneers. A fifth of the monument is also within Lake Mead National Recreation Area; Grand Canyon-Parashant is not considered an official unit of the park system. There are no paved roads or visitor services but offroad vehicles can reach scenic viewpoints.
Grand Portage	Minnesota; 47.96°N 89.68°W	NPS	January 27, 1960	709.97 acres (2.9 km^{2})	94,137	The Grand Portage itself is an 8.5-mile (13.7 km) footpath which bypasses a set of waterfalls on the Pigeon River near Lake Superior. The region was a vital trade route and center of fur trade activity as well as an Anishinaabeg Ojibwe heritage site.
Grand Staircase–Escalante	Utah; 37.4°N 111.68°W	BLM	September 18, 1996	1,870,000 acres (7,567.6 km^{2})		The Grand Staircase, the Kaiparowits Plateau, and the Canyons of the Escalante make up the three areas of the monument, home to unique dinosaur fossils, sandstone arches, and the sequence of layers of rock units spanning 400 million years. It is notable for its paleontological finds and geology, and it was the first monument to be maintained by the Bureau of Land Management.
Hagerman Fossil Beds	Idaho; 42.79°N 114.95°W	NPS	November 18, 1988	4,351.15 acres (17.6 km^{2})	26,477	This monument contains the largest concentration of Hagerman horse fossils in North America. It protects the world's richest known fossil deposits from the late Pliocene epoch, 3.5 million years ago. These plants and animals represent the last glimpse of time that existed before the Ice Age, and the earliest appearances of modern flora and fauna.
Hanford Reach	Washington; 46.48°N 119.53°W	FWS, DOE	June 8, 2000	194,450.93 acres (786.9 km^{2})		Created from what used to be the security buffer surrounding the Hanford Nuclear Reservation, this area has been untouched by development or agriculture since 1943. The area is part of the Columbia River Plateau, formed by basalt lava flows and water erosion, and is named after the Hanford Reach, the last free flowing section of the Columbia River.
Harriet Tubman Underground Railroad	Maryland; 38.4483°N 76.1387°W	FWS	March 25, 2013	480 acres (1.9 km^{2})		Harriet Tubman was a famed conductor on the Underground Railroad, leading dozens of slaves to freedom. This monument includes sites relating to Tubman's life, including the slave-built Stewart's Canal and the home of Jacob Jackson. The areas within the national monument that are managed by the NPS have been redesignated as a National Historical Park (NHP), and the FWS lands are in Blackwater National Wildlife Refuge.
Hohokam Pima	Arizona; 33.19°N 111.91°W	NPS	October 21, 1972	1,690 acres (6.8 km^{2})		Hohokam Pima is part of the Gila River Indian Community and not open to the public. The monument includes the site of the Snaketown settlement, archeological remains of the Hohokam culture, which lived in the area until 1200. Excavations of pit houses, fields, and irrigation canals were refilled in the 1960s, leaving nothing above ground.
Hovenweep	Colorado, Utah; 37.38°N 109.08°W	NPS	March 2, 1923	784.93 acres (3.2 km^{2})	40,574	Hovenweep contains six clusters of Native American ruins. Holly Canyon, Hackberry Canyon, Cutthroat Castle and Goodman Point are in Colorado and Square Tower and Cajon are in Utah. Ancestral Puebloans lived in the Hovenweep area from 1150 to 1350.
Ironwood Forest	Arizona; 32.46°N 111.57°W	BLM	June 9, 2000	129,055 acres (522.3 km^{2})		Located within the Sonoran Desert, significant concentrations of ironwood (Olneya tesota) trees and two endangered animal and plant species are found within the monument. More than 200 Hohokam and Paleoindian archeological sites have been identified from between 600 and 1450 AD
Jewel Cave	South Dakota; 43.73°N 103.83°W	NPS	February 7, 1908	1,273.51 acres (5.2 km^{2})	142,356	Jewel Cave is the third longest cave in the world, with more than 215 miles (346 km) of mapped passageways beneath the Black Hills of South Dakota. The entrance was discovered by miners in 1900 and was named for its calcite crystals.
John Day Fossil Beds	Oregon; 44.67°N 120.05°W	NPS	October 26, 1974	14,062.02 acres (56.9 km^{2})	204,621	Located within the John Day River Basin, the Fossil Beds have a well-preserved, complete record of fossil plants and animals from more than 40 of the 65 million years of the Cenozoic Era. The monument is divided into three units: Painted Hills, named for its delicately colored stratifications; Sheep Rock; and Clarno. Blue Basin near Sheep Rock is a volcanic ash bowl transformed into claystone by eons of erosion, colored pastel blue by minerals.
Jurassic	Utah; 39.32°N 110.69°W	BLM	March 12, 2019	850 acres (3.4 km^{2})		More than 12,000 bones from at least 74 dinosaurs have been found at the Cleveland-Lloyd Dinosaur Quarry so far, making it the paleontological site with the greatest concentration of bones from the Jurassic period. The bones come from a variety of mostly carnivorous species (more than half Allosaurus) and it is unknown why they are mixed together.
Kasha-Katuwe Tent Rocks	New Mexico; 35.67°N 106.42°W	BLM	January 17, 2001	4,647 acres (18.8 km^{2})		Kasha-Katuwe is known for its geology of layers of volcanic rock and ash deposited by a volcanic explosion. Over time, weathering and erosion of these layers has created canyons and tent rocks. The tent rocks themselves are cones of soft pumice and tuff beneath harder caprocks.
Katahdin Woods and Waters	Maine; 45.97°N 68.62°W	NPS	August 24, 2016	87,564.27 acres (354.4 km^{2})		Katahdin Woods and Waters National Monument protects mountains and wilderness in the North Maine Woods, including a section of the East Branch Penobscot River. It borders the eastern side of Baxter State Park.
Lava Beds	California; 41.71°N 121.51°W	NPS	November 21, 1925	46,692.42 acres (189.0 km^{2})	127,771	This is the site of the largest concentration of lava tube caves in North America. It also includes Petroglyph Point, one of the largest panels of Native American rock art. The monument lies on the northeast flank of the Medicine Lake Volcano, the largest volcano in the Cascade Range.
Little Bighorn Battlefield	Montana; 45.57°N 107.43°W	NPS	July 1, 1940	765.34 acres (3.1 km^{2})	272,591	The 1876 Battle of the Little Bighorn between George Armstrong Custer's 7th Cavalry and a combined Lakota Sioux, Northern Cheyenne and Arapaho force led by Sitting Bull and Crazy Horse took place here.
Marianas Trench Marine	Northern Mariana Islands, Guam; 20°N 145°E	FWS, NOAA	January 6, 2009	61,077,668 acres (247,172.6 km^{2})		This marine monument includes the waters and submerged lands of the three northernmost islands of the Mariana Archipelago, the submerged lands of 21 designated volcanic features, and the Mariana Trench, the deepest place on Earth.
Medgar and Myrlie Evers Home	Mississippi; 32.341°N 90.213°W	NPS	December 10, 2020	0.74 acres (0.0 km^{2})		Medgar Evers was a civil rights activist who served as a field secretary for the NAACP to end segregation and promote voting rights in Mississippi. He was assassinated outside his home in Jackson by a white supremacist in 1963. His wife Myrlie moved away but owned the home until 1993 and later served as chairwoman of the NAACP.
Military Working Dog Teams	Texas; 29.390°N 98.617°W	Air Force	October 28, 2013	0.069 acres (0.0 km^{2})		The memorial at Lackland Air Force Base, the home of the U.S. Department of Defense Military Working Dog Program, honors the efforts and sacrifices of military working dogs in the service of the United States.
Mill Springs Battlefield	Kentucky; 37.07°N 84.74°W	NPS	September 22, 2020	1,459 acres (5.9 km^{2})		The Battle of Mill Springs was fought at this site in January 1862 and was the first major victory for the Union Army. The one-day battle saw Union forces led by George Henry Thomas defeat Confederate regiments led by Felix Zollicoffer, who died in action. The site is now largely an open field with a visitor center adjacent to Mill Springs National Cemetery.
Misty Fjords	Alaska; 55.62°N 130.61°W	USFS	December 1, 1978	2,294,072 acres (9,283.8 km^{2})		Called The Yosemite of the North for its similar geology, the monument has widespread light-colored granite, about 50 to 70 million years old (Eocene Epoch to Cretaceous Period), that has been sculpted by glaciers that gouged deep U-shaped troughs. Mountain goats live in the higher elevations, while brown and black bear are also common. Part of Tongass National Forest.
Mojave Trails	California; 34.6°N 116.0°W	BLM	February 12, 2016	1,600,000 acres (6,475.0 km^{2})		The Mojave Trails National Monument includes several rugged mountain ranges, ancient lava flows at the Amboy Crater, and the Cadiz Dunes. Human features are Native American trading routes, World War II-era training camps, and an undeveloped segment of Route 66.
Montezuma Castle	Arizona; 34.61°N 111.84°W	NPS	December 8, 1906	1,015.52 acres (4.1 km^{2})	390,151	Montezuma Castle features cliff dwellings built by the Pre-Columbian Sinagua people between 1100 and 1400 AD. The site's name is a misnomer as is it has no connection to Montezuma. However, some modern day native tribes that do have connections to the site include the Yavapai, Hopi, and Zuni. The monument also includes Montezuma Well, which has been used for irrigation since the 8th century.
Mount St. Helens Volcanic	Washington; 46.23°N 122.18°W	USFS	August 27, 1982	113,205 acres (458.1 km^{2})	183,000 (2016)	Following the 1980 eruption of the now-8,363-foot-tall (2,549 m) Mount St. Helens, the environment was left to respond naturally to the disturbance. The volcanic crater is surrounded by a pumice plain with deposits from the landslide, preserved wind-blown trees, and the Ape Cave lava tube. Part of Gifford Pinchot National Forest.
Muir Woods	California; 37.89°N 122.58°W	NPS	January 9, 1908	553.55 acres (2.2 km^{2})	957,932	Part of the Golden Gate National Recreation Area, it protects one of the last old growth Coast redwood (Sequoia sempervirens) groves in the San Francisco Bay Area as well as one of the most easily accessed.
Natural Bridges	Utah; 37.58°N 110°W	NPS	April 16, 1908	7,636.49 acres (30.9 km^{2})	103,118	Located at the junction of White Canyon and Armstrong Canyon, it is part of the Colorado River drainage. It features the second- and third-largest natural bridges in the western hemisphere, carved from the white Triassic sandstone of the Cedar Mesa Formation that gives White Canyon its name.
Navajo	Arizona; 36.68°N 110.53°W	NPS	March 20, 1909	360 acres (1.5 km^{2})	61,195	This monument preserves three of the most intact cliff dwellings of the Ancestral Puebloan people. The monument is high on the Shonto plateau, overlooking the Tsegi Canyon system on the Navajo Nation in Northern Arizona.
Newberry Volcanic	Oregon; 43.69°N 121.25°W	USFS	November 5, 1990	57,323 acres (232.0 km^{2})	225,000 (2018)	This monument protects the area around the Newberry Volcano and its geologic features including Lava Butte and the Lava River Cave. The volcanic site in the Cascades is still geothermally active and includes lakes and ancient lava flow fields. Part of Deschutes National Forest.
Northeast Canyons and Seamounts Marine	Atlantic Ocean; 40.4°N 68°W	FWS, NOAA	September 15, 2016	3,144,320 acres (12,724.6 km^{2})		The monument protects four underwater seamounts and three very deep canyons in the continental shelf 100 miles (160 km) off the coast of Massachusetts, home to deep-water corals, endangered whales, and migratory fish and birds.
Oregon Caves	Oregon; 42.10°N 123.41°W	NPS	July 12, 1909	4,554.03 acres (18.4 km^{2})	67,417	The monument is known for its marble caves, as well as for the Pleistocene jaguar and grizzly bear fossils found in the deeper caves. There are four primary buildings: The Oregon Caves Chateau, The Ranger Residence, The Chalet, and the old Dormitory.
Organ Mountains–Desert Peaks	New Mexico; 32.3°N 106.55°W	BLM	May 21, 2014	419,532 acres (1,697.8 km^{2})		The protected area includes five mountain ranges that rise above the Chihuahua Desert: Robledo Mountains, Sierra de las Uvas, Doña Ana Mountains, Organ Mountains and Potrillo Mountains. There are approximately 870 vascular plant species, and the area is popular for hiking and climbing.
Organ Pipe Cactus	Arizona; 32.04°N 112.86°W	NPS	April 13, 1937	330,688.86 acres (1,338.3 km^{2})	260,375	This monument is the only place in the United States where the organ pipe cactus grows wild. There are many other types of cacti and desert flora native to the Sonoran Desert. The Bates Well Ranch and Dos Lomitas Ranch are also within the monument.
Oval Office	District of Columbia; 38.8974°N 77.0374°W	NPS	November 5, 2026	0.01874 acres (0.0 km^{2})		This monument includes the Oval Office, the formal working space of the president of the United States at the White House in Washington, D.C. Also included are the Outer Oval Office (Rooms 106 and 108) and the Cabinet Room.
Pacific Islands Heritage Marine	US Minor Outlying Islands south-southwest of Hawaii; 16.75°N 169.52°W	FWS, NOAA	January 6, 2009	313,941,851 acres (1,270,477.6 km^{2})		The marine monument consists of Baker Island, Howland Island, Jarvis Island, Johnston Atoll, Kingman Reef, Palmyra Atoll, and Wake Island, which are scattered across the Pacific Ocean southwest of Hawaii. It was expanded in 2014 to include the oceans 200 nmi (370 km) offshore, approximately a 16-fold increase in size, to conserve vast populations of unique corals, fish, marine mammals, birds, and plants.
Papahānaumokuākea Marine	Hawaii, U.S. Minor Outlying Islands; 25.7°N 171.73°W	FWS, NOAA	June 15, 2006	372,848,597 acres (1,508,864.7 km^{2})		The marine monument consists of ocean waters and 10 islands and atolls of the Northwestern Hawaiian Islands including Midway Atoll. The monument was created in 2006 with 139,797 square miles (362,070 km^{2}), and its boundaries were expanded on August 26, 2016, more than quadrupling in size to be the largest protected area on Earth, almost as large as the Gulf of Mexico. The Northwestern Hawaiian Islands archipelago "is the planet's largest seabird gathering site, with more than 14 million birds from 22 species, and is home to nearly all Laysan albatrosses and the remaining endangered Hawaiian monk seals." It was declared a World Heritage Site in 2010.
Petroglyph	New Mexico; 35.16°N 106.76°W	NPS	June 27, 1990	7,209.3 acres (29.2 km^{2})	268,613	This monument protects a variety of cultural and natural resources, including five volcanic cones, hundreds of archeological sites and an estimated 25,000 images carved by native peoples and early Spanish settlers. It lies on West Mesa, a volcanic basalt escarpment.
Pipe Spring	Arizona; 36.86°N 112.73°W	NPS	May 31, 1923	40 acres (0.2 km^{2})	25,179	Rich with Native American, early explorer, and Mormon pioneer history, this site shows Ancestral Puebloans and Kaibab Paiute Indian and pioneer life in the Old West, including the cabin where explorer John Wesley Powell's survey crew stayed in 1871. The water of Pipe Spring, discovered in 1858, made it possible for plants, animals, and people to live in this dry desert region.
Pipestone	Minnesota; 44.01°N 96.33°W	NPS	August 25, 1937	281.78 acres (1.1 km^{2})	73,267	This monument preserves traditional catlinite quarries used to make ceremonial pipes, vitally important to traditional Plains Indian culture. The quarries are sacred to the Sioux and Lakota people and are historically neutral territory where enrolled citizens of all tribes can quarry the stone.
Pompeys Pillar	Montana; 45.99°N 108.001°W	BLM	January 17, 2001	51 acres (0.2 km^{2})		Pompeys Pillar is a 150-foot (46 m) sandstone pillar from the late Cretaceous Hell Creek Formation next to the Yellowstone River. It has an abundance of Native American petroglyphs, as well as the signature of William Clark, who named the formation after Sacagawea's infant son.
Poverty Point	Louisiana; 32.63°N 91.41°W	NPS	October 31, 1988	910.85 acres (3.7 km^{2})		Poverty Point is a prehistoric archeological site that dates from between 1650 and 700 BC and consisting of six earthen rings and seven mounds. The diameter of the outside ridge is 0.75 miles (1.21 km), and the largest mound rises 51 feet (16 m). Although an NPS unit, the monument is owned and operated by the state of Louisiana. It was declared a World Heritage Site in 2014.
Prehistoric Trackways	New Mexico; 32.35°N 106.9°W	BLM	March 30, 2009	5,280 acres (21.4 km^{2})		Prehistoric Trackways contains fossilized footprints of numerous Paleozoic amphibians, reptiles, and insects, as well as fossilized plants and petrified wood dating back approximately 280 million years.
President Lincoln and Soldiers’ Home	District of Columbia; 38.9416°N 77.0117°W	AFRH	July 7, 2000	2.3 acres (0.01 km^{2})		President Abraham Lincoln and his family resided seasonally on the grounds of the Armed Forces Retirement Home, which was founded in 1851 for homeless and disabled war veterans. The national monument and visitor center are preserved and operated by President Lincoln's Cottage at the Soldiers’ Home on behalf of the Armed Forces Retirement Home.
Rainbow Bridge	Utah; 37.08°N 110.96°W	NPS	May 30, 1910	160 acres (0.6 km^{2})	110,904	Rainbow Bridge is one of the world's largest natural bridges. It stands 290 feet (88 m) tall and spans 275 feet (84 m) wide; the top of the bridge is 42 feet (13 m) thick and 33 feet (10 m) wide. It was made from sandstone formed during the Triassic and the Jurassic periods.
Río Grande del Norte	New Mexico; 36.66667°N 105.7°W	BLM	March 25, 2013	242,710 acres (982.2 km^{2})		This site includes part of the Rio Grande Gorge and extinct volcanoes of the Taos Plateau volcanic field. There are a variety of archaeological and historical artifacts including petroglyphs and Hispanic settlement sites. It is home to an assortment of wildlife and recreation opportunities.
Rose Atoll Marine	American Samoa; 14.55°S 168.54°W	FWS, NOAA	January 6, 2009	8,609,045 acres (34,839.6 km^{2})		This marine monument consists of the two small islands of Rose Atoll, its lagoon, and waters surrounding it. The atoll's coral reef is colored by distinct pink coralline algae and provides habitat to nesting hawksbill and green turtles, large predators including whitetip reef shark, and endangered fish like the humphead wrasse. Seventeen species of protected seabirds nest on the island. It is east of American Samoa and the southernmost point in the U.S.
Russell Cave	Alabama; 34.97°N 85.80°W	NPS	May 11, 1961	310.45 acres (1.3 km^{2})	21,620	Donated by the National Geographic Society, the cave's exceptionally large main entrance was used as a shelter by prehistoric Indians from the earliest known human settlement in the southeastern United States. The rock from which Russell Cave was formed originated in sediments deposited over 300 million years ago at the bottom of an inland sea that covered the region.
Saint Francis Dam Disaster	California; 34.55°N 118.51°W	USFS	March 12, 2019	353 acres (1.4 km^{2})		The St. Francis Dam was a 700 ft-wide (210 m) dam that supported a reservoir for Los Angeles's water supply. It catastrophically failed in 1928 and the flood killed at least 431 people. The site now has ruins of the dam's concrete base in a forested valley. Part of Angeles National Forest.
Salinas Pueblo Missions	New Mexico; 34.26°N 106.06°W	NPS	November 1, 1909	1,071.42 acres (4.3 km^{2})	34,629	Formerly known as Gran Quivira National Monument, it is where Native American trade communities of Tiwa- and Tompiro-speaking Puebloans lived when Spanish Franciscan missionaries made contact in the 17th century. What remains are the ruins of four mission churches, at Quarai, Abó, and Gran Quivira, and the partially excavated pueblo of Las Humanas.
San Gabriel Mountains	California; 34.22°N 118.06°W	USFS	October 10, 2014	452,096 acres (1,829.6 km^{2})		The San Gabriel Mountains in northern Los Angeles County and western San Bernardino County, California, have peaks as high as 10,068 ft (3,069 m), providing a habitat for the endangered California condor and Nelson's bighorn sheep. It is an important watershed and recreation site for the Los Angeles area and contains more than 600 archaeological sites. Part of Angeles and San Bernardino National Forests.
San Juan Islands	Washington; 48.53°N 123.03°W	BLM	March 25, 2013	970 acres (3.9 km^{2})		The rugged landscapes of the San Juan Islands, an archipelago in the Pacific Northwest, are a habitat for orcas, eagles, and seals and provide opportunities for kayaking, birdwatching, and other activities. The monument protects numerous small rocks, islands, and points, including the Cattle Point Light.
Sand to Snow	California; 34.08°N 116.68°W	BLM, USFS	February 12, 2016	154,000 acres (623.2 km^{2})		This monument extends from the Mojave and Sonoran Desert floors up to over 10,000 feet in the San Bernardino Mountains, including the San Gorgonio Wilderness. The site protects 1,700 Native American petroglyphs and other archaeological sites. Part is in San Bernardino National Forest.
Santa Rosa and San Jacinto Mountains	California; 33.80°N 116.70°W	BLM, USFS	October 24, 2000	280,009 acres (1,133.2 km^{2})		This monument preserves large portions of the Santa Rosa and San Jacinto ranges, the northernmost of the Peninsular Ranges. Parts are within San Bernardino National Forest and the California Desert Conservation Area.
Sáttítla Highlands	California; 41.5°N 121.5°W	USFS	January 14, 2025	224,676 acres (909.2 km^{2})		A vast, remote volcanic landscape in Northern California centered on the immense Medicine Lake Volcano, where towering obsidian flows like Glass Mountain, sprawling lava fields, caves, and cinder cones coexist with rare relict forests, dark skies, critical aquifers that supply millions with clean water, and sacred Indigenous homelands now co-stewarded with tribes.
Scotts Bluff	Nebraska; 41.83°N 103.70°W	NPS	December 12, 1919	3,004.73 acres (12.2 km^{2})	142,028	Scotts Bluff is an important 19th century geologic formation and landmark on the Oregon Trail and Mormon Trail. It contains multiple bluffs on the south side of the North Platte River, but it is named after a prominent bluff called Scotts Bluff which rises more than 830 feet (250 m) above the plains at its highest point. The monument is composed of five rock formations named Crown Rock, Dome Rock, Eagle Rock, Saddle Rock, and Sentinel Rock.
Springfield 1908 Race Riot	Illinois; 39.804°N 89.641°W	NPS	August 16, 2024	1.57 acres (0.0 km^{2})		In 1908 a mob of 5,000 white residents attacked the Black community of Springfield, Illinois, destroyed several blocks of residences and business, and lynched two Black Americans. The mass racial violence was one of many such events of brutality and intimidation in that era, leading to the establishment of the NAACP. The monument includes the excavated foundations of several of the destroyed homes in the segregated neighborhood.
Sonoran Desert	Arizona; 33.00°N 112.46°W	BLM	January 17, 2001	486,400 acres (1,968.4 km^{2})		This monument protects a small portion of the Sonoran Desert. It is home to several federally listed endangered species and also has three wilderness areas, many significant archeological and historic sites, and remnants of several important historic trails.
Statue of Liberty	New York, New Jersey; 40.69°N 74.04°W	NPS	October 15, 1924	58.38 acres (0.2 km^{2})	4,335,431	This iconic statue, built in 1886 on Liberty Island and 151 feet (46 m) tall, commemorates the centennial of the signing of the United States Declaration of Independence and is a gesture of friendship from France to the U.S. Liberty Enlightening the World is a symbol of welcoming immigrants to the U.S. and is listed as a World Heritage Site. Ellis Island, where 12 million immigrants entering the U.S. passed through, is included in the monument.
Stonewall	New York; 40.73364°N 74.00212°W	NPS	June 24, 2016	7.7 acres (0.0 km^{2})	511,220	The Stonewall Inn is a gay bar in New York City and the site of the Stonewall riots of 1969, which are widely considered to be the single most important event leading to the gay liberation movement and the modern fight for LGBT rights in the United States. Also included is Christopher Park across the street.
Sunset Crater Volcano	Arizona; 35.36°N 111.50°W	NPS	May 30, 1930	3,040 acres (12.3 km^{2})	104,583	Sunset Crater is the youngest in a string of volcanoes in the San Francisco volcanic field that is related to the nearby San Francisco Peaks. Final volcanic activity in the 13th century painted the upper portion of the cone with bright red and orange rocks, giving the volcano its name. Hikers can walk through a black lava flow and on a second cinder crater.
Timpanogos Cave	Utah; 40.44°N 111.71°W	NPS	October 14, 1922	250 acres (1.0 km^{2})	121,311	The Timpanogos cave system is in the Wasatch Range in the American Fork Canyon. Three main chambers are accessible: Hansen Cave, Middle Cave, and Timpanogos Cave. Many colorful cave features or speleothems can be seen, including helictites, cave bacon, cave columns, flowstone, cave popcorn, and cave drapery.
Tonto	Arizona; 33.65°N 111.09°W	NPS	October 21, 1907	1,120 acres (4.5 km^{2})	39,822	Lying on the northeastern edge of the Sonoran Desert along the Salt River, Tonto preserves two cliff dwellings that were occupied by the Salado culture during the 13th to 15th centuries. The monument is surrounded by Tonto National Forest.
Tule Lake	California; 41.89°N 121.37°W	NPS, FWS	December 5, 2008	1,391 acres (5.629 km^{2})		Tule Lake Segregation Center was the largest of ten concentration camps used for the internment of Japanese Americans during World War II. 29,800 U.S. citizens and immigrants were held there, including those segregated from other camps for political reasons. The site includes the main segregation camp; Camp Tulelake, which was originally a Civilian Conservation Corps work site and later a prisoner-of-war camp and extension of the segregation center; and the Peninsula/Castle Rock bluff in Tule Lake National Wildlife Refuge. Originally designated as part of World War II Valor in the Pacific National Monument, which was divided and renamed March 12, 2019.
Tule Springs Fossil Beds	Nevada; 36.32°N 115.27°W	NPS	December 19, 2014	22,650 acres (91.7 km^{2})		A major archaeological site north of Las Vegas where thousands of prehistoric fossils, including mammoth, lion, and camel, have been found in an area that was once a wetland.
Tuzigoot	Arizona; 34.79°N 112.04°W	NPS	July 25, 1939	811.89 acres (3.3 km^{2})	98,090	Tuzigoot preserves a two- to three-story pueblo ruin on the summit of a limestone and sandstone ridge in the Verde Valley. It was built by the Sinagua people between 1125 and 1400.
Upper Missouri River Breaks	Montana; 47.78°N 109.02°W	BLM	January 17, 2001	377,346 acres (1,527.1 km^{2})		A series of badland areas characterized by rock outcroppings, steep bluffs and grassy plains along the 149-mile (240 km) Upper Missouri National Wild and Scenic River in central Montana, The Breaks is home to at least 60 mammal species and hundreds of bird species. Charles Marion Russell often painted here, and Lewis and Clark traveled on this pathway.
Vermilion Cliffs	Arizona; 36.81°N 111.74°W	BLM	November 9, 2000	279,566 acres (1,131.4 km^{2})		Steep eroded escarpments consisting primarily of sandstone, siltstone, limestone and shale rise as much as 3,000 feet (910 m) above their base. These sedimentary rocks have been deeply eroded for millions of years, exposing hundreds of layers of richly colored rock strata along Paria Canyon. The Coyote Buttes, across the Paria Plateau from the Canyon and Vermilion Cliffs, include undulating slopes like The Wave.
Virgin Islands Coral Reef	U.S. Virgin Islands; 18.31°N 64.72°W	NPS	January 17, 2001	12,708.07 acres (51.4 km^{2})		These coral reefs, sandy sea bottoms, seagrass beds, and mangrove forests are in a 3-mile (4.8 km) marine belt that surrounds St John and Virgin Islands National Park.
Waco Mammoth	Texas; 31.606°N 97.174°W	NPS	July 10, 2015	107.23 acres (0.4 km^{2})	106,932	The Waco Mammoth National Monument is a paleontological site and museum in Waco, Texas, where fossils of 24 Columbian mammoths (Mammuthus columbi) and other mammals from the Pleistocene Epoch have been uncovered. The site is the largest known concentration of a single herd of mammoths dying from the same event, which is believed to have been a flash flood.
Walnut Canyon	Arizona; 35.17°N 111.51°W	NPS	November 30, 1915	3,529.26 acres (14.3 km^{2})	167,736	Walnut Canyon protects dozens of cliff dwelling rooms constructed around the 12th century by the Sinagua people, who navigated the challenging cliffs to access sparse water. It lies on the Colorado Plateau and cuts through the Permian Kaibab Limestone, which exposes the Toroweap Formation and Coconino Sandstone.
Wupatki	Arizona; 35.52°N 111.37°W	NPS	December 9, 1924	35,422.13 acres (143.3 km^{2})	205,122	Several settlement sites built by the Sinagua, Cohonina, and Ancestral Puebloans are scattered throughout the monument, showing evidence of trade and agriculture from the 6th to 13th centuries. About 2,000 Ancient Pueblo People moved here to farm after an 11th century eruption of Sunset Crater spread ash forming fertile soil.
Yucca House	Colorado; 37.25°N 108.69°W	NPS	December 19, 1919	33.87 acres (0.1 km^{2})		Designated a research national monument, it is a large unexcavated Ancestral Puebloan archeological site. The site is one of many Ancestral Puebloan village sites in the Montezuma Valley occupied between 900 and 1300 AD.

== See also ==
- List of national parks of the United States
- List of national memorials of the United States
- List of areas in the United States National Park System
- National Conservation Lands
- Protected areas of the United States
