= Kiska Harbor =

Coordinates: 51°58′01″N 177°33′50″E

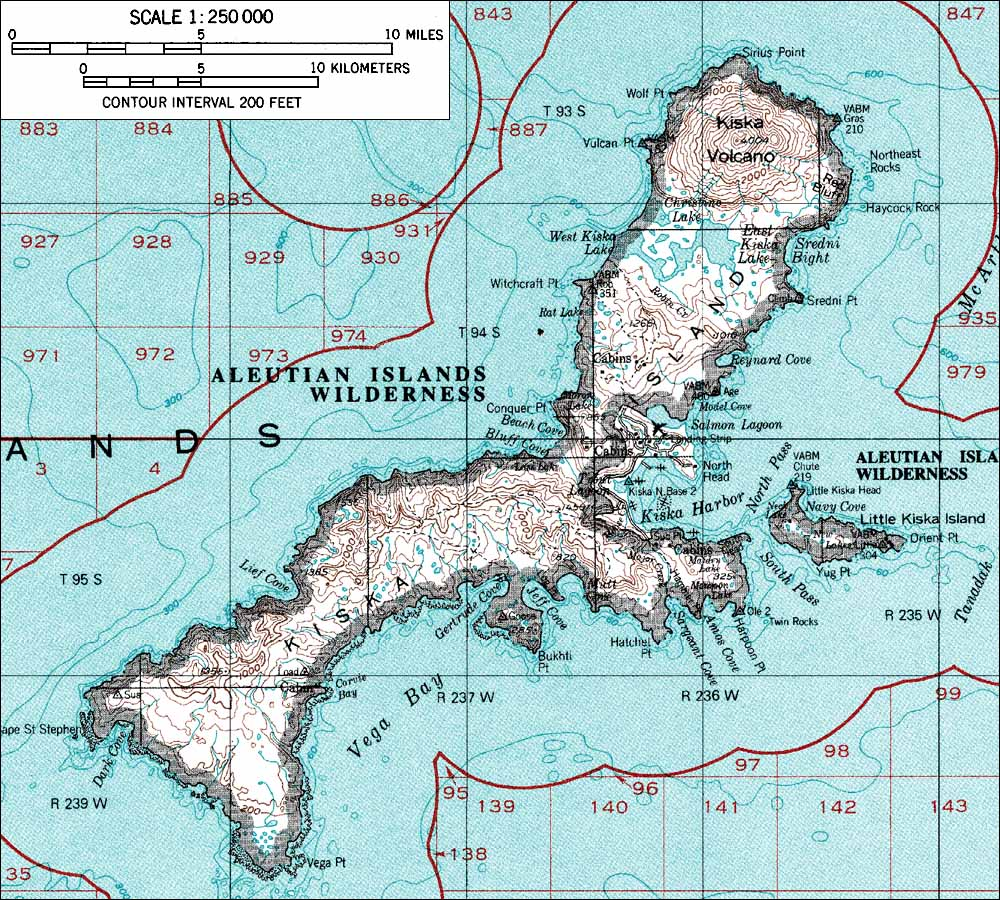
The Kiska Map

Kiska Harbor is an inlet on the east coast of the island of Kiska in the Aleutian Islands in Alaska.

Kiska Harbor is bounded by North Head on the north and by South Head on the south. Little Kiska Island lies off the coast of Kiska Island immediately east of Kiska Harbor.

During their occupation of Kiska Island from 6 June 1942 to 28 July 1943 during World War II, the Japanese used Kiska Harbor as a naval base.
