= Aleutian Islands World War II National Monument =

National Monument of the United States in Alaska

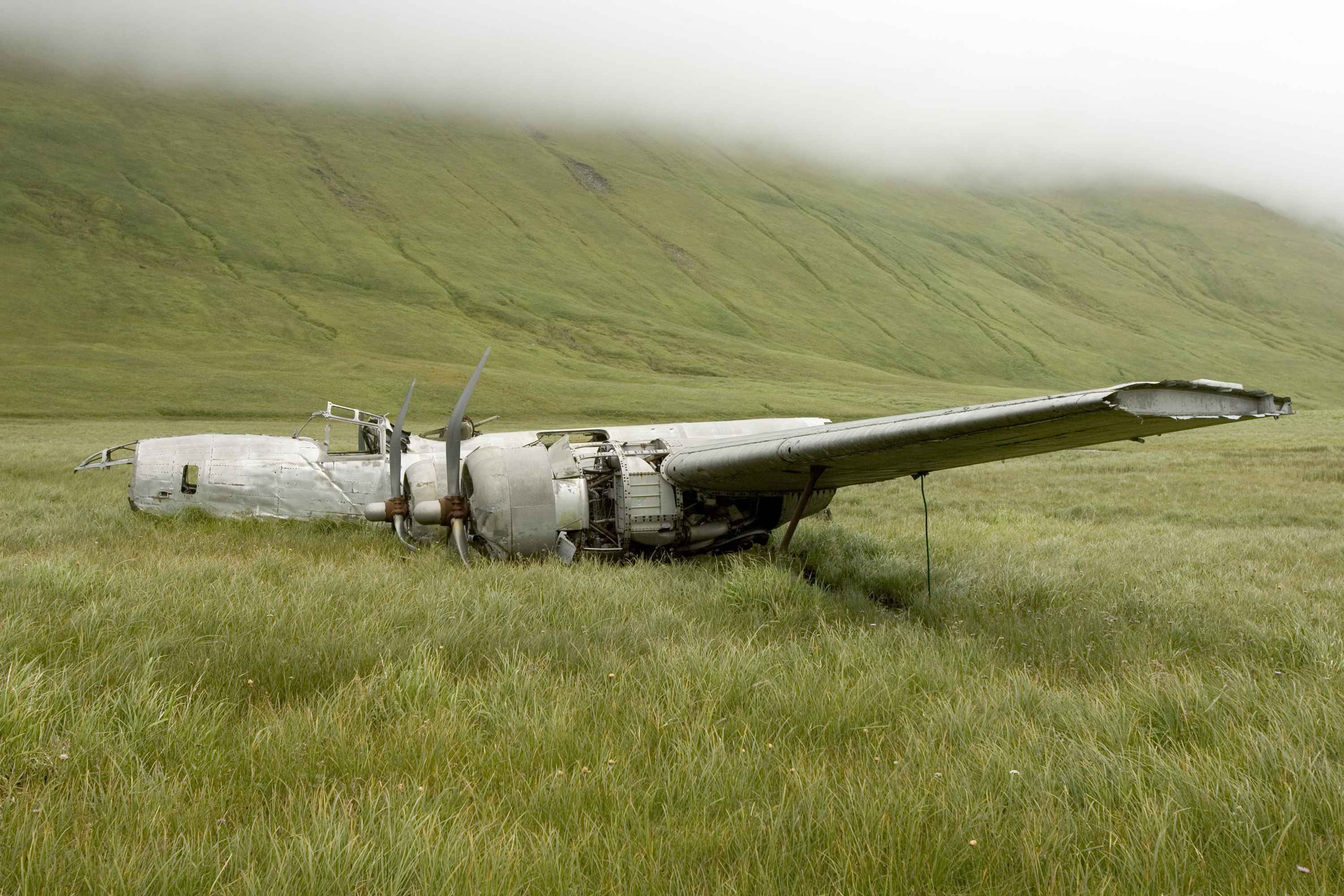
Atka B-24D Liberator on Atka Island, Alaska

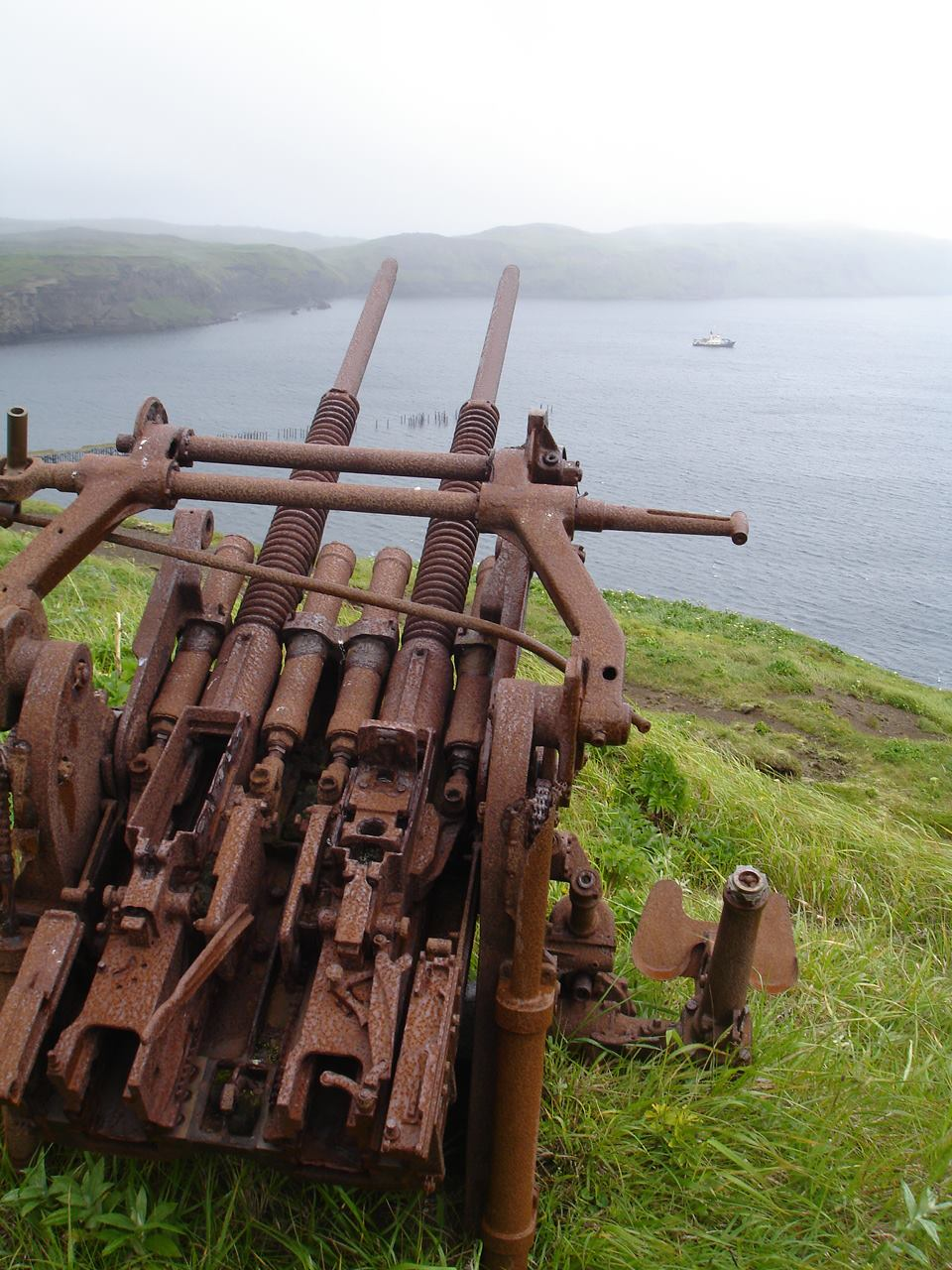
Abandoned Type 96 25 mm AT/AA gun on Kiska Island

The Aleutian Islands World War II National Monument is a U.S. national monument in the Aleutian Islands of Alaska. The monument was initially created as part of World War II Valor in the Pacific National Monument in 2008 by an executive order of President George W. Bush. In 2019, it was separated to become a national monument in its own right.

Located on four islands within the Alaska Maritime National Wildlife Refuge, the monument includes battlefields, Japanese-occupied sites and an aircraft crash landing site.

It is managed by the United States Fish and Wildlife Service.

== History ==
The Aleutian Islands of Alaska were a fiercely contested Pacific battleground between the United States and Japan during World War II. The Aleutian Islands campaign was the only campaign of World War II which was fought on North American soil.

On December 5, 2008, a Presidential Proclamation made by President George W. Bush created the World War II Valor in the Pacific National Monument. The monument included sites in Alaska, California and Hawaii. This included Attu Island, Atka Island, Kiska Island and Little Kiska Island within the Aleutian Islands. Kiska Island is home to the largest intact collection of Japanese artillery pieces in the world and Atka Island contains the crash site and remains of a B-24D Liberator aircraft, one of only two known to still be in existence. The Islands were already managed by the United States Fish and Wildlife Service as part of the Alaska Maritime National Wildlife Refuge which was created by President William H. Taft in 1913.

Separate monuments were created for each state in 2019 when the John D. Dingell Jr. Conservation, Management, and Recreation Act was signed into law.

== Locations ==
The national monument includes three sites:

- Battle of Attu battlefield remnants on Attu Island (four areas totaling 2,600 acres (11 km^{2}))
- Japanese Occupation Site on Kiska Island and Little Kiska Island (five areas totaling 2,345 acres (9.49 km^{2}))
- Atka B-24D Liberator crash site on Atka Island (one area of 5 acres (0.020 km^{2}))

== See also ==
- Aleutian World War II National Historic Area
- List of national monuments of the United States
