= AKB =

AKB may refer to:

- Atka Airport, an airport on Atka Island, Alaska (IATA code AKB)
- AKB48, a Japanese girl band
- Akihabara Station, JR East station code
- Akademibokhandeln, a Swedish chain of book stores
- Andrew K. Benton, the seventh president of Pepperdine University
- Anna Kinberg Batra, a Swedish politician and former leader of the Moderate Party 2015-2017
- Andrew Keenan-Bolger, a musical theatre actor known for Newsies and Tuck Everlasting
- Ako Bicol, a political party that participates in the Philippine party-list elections
