= Little Kiska Island =

One of the Rat Islands in Alaska, U.S.

Coordinates: 51°57′09″N 177°39′33″E

- Interactive map of Little Kiska Island

Geography
- Location: Northern Pacific Ocean
- Archipelago: Aleutian Islands (Rat Islands)
- Length: 6 km (3.7 mi)
- Width: 2 km (1.2 mi)

Administration
- United States
- State: Alaska
- Borough: Aleutians West Census Area

Demographics
- Population: 0

Little Kiska Island is an island off east coast of the island of Kiska in the Rat Islands (part of the Aleutian Islands) in Alaska. It lies immediately east of Kiska Harbor and is approximately 6 kilometers long and 2 kilometers wide. The island has multiple hills, creeks, and ranges which were all mapped by the U.S. Navy for military purposes during WWII. The western end of the island is part of Aleutian Islands World War II National Monument.

One of the creeks on the island drew notoriety for being named "Nazi Creek". The creek was renamed to "Kaxchim Chiĝanaa" in July 2025.
