= World War II Valor in the Pacific National Monument =

Former National Monument of the United States

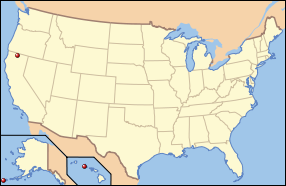
- Interactive map of World War II Valor in the Pacific National Monument
- Location: Alaska, California and Hawaii, U.S.
- Area: 6,310 acres (25.5 km^{2})
- Created: December 5, 2008
- Visitors: 1,574,156 (in 2015)
- Governing body: National Park Service and Fish and Wildlife Service
- Website: World War II Valor in the Pacific National Monument

The World War II Valor in the Pacific National Monument was a U.S. national monument spread across the states of Alaska, California and Hawaii, honoring events, people, and sites of the Pacific Theater engagement of the United States during World War II. It was created by presidential proclamation in 2008 as a united site and was abolished in 2019 when each part was given their own individual identity.

== History ==
Prior to establishment, the only public monument dedicated to the Pacific Theatre in World War II in the region was the USS Arizona Memorial. The monument was created on December 5, 2008, through a proclamation issued by President George W. Bush under the authority of the Antiquities Act of 1906. The proclamation date was selected in anticipation of the 67th anniversary of the Attack on Pearl Harbor, on December 7, 2008. This was the first proclamation of a national monument in Alaska since the passage of the Alaska National Interest Lands Conservation Act (ANILCA) in 1980. ANILCA limited new land withdrawals in Alaska without Congressional approval to 5,000 acres.

The John D. Dingell Jr. Conservation, Management, and Recreation Act, signed into law March 12, 2019, abolished the national monument. It split the monument into three individually distinct memorials. The World War II Valor in the Pacific National Monument was replaced with the Pearl Harbor National Memorial, Aleutian Islands World War II National Monument, and Tule Lake National Monument.

== Sites ==
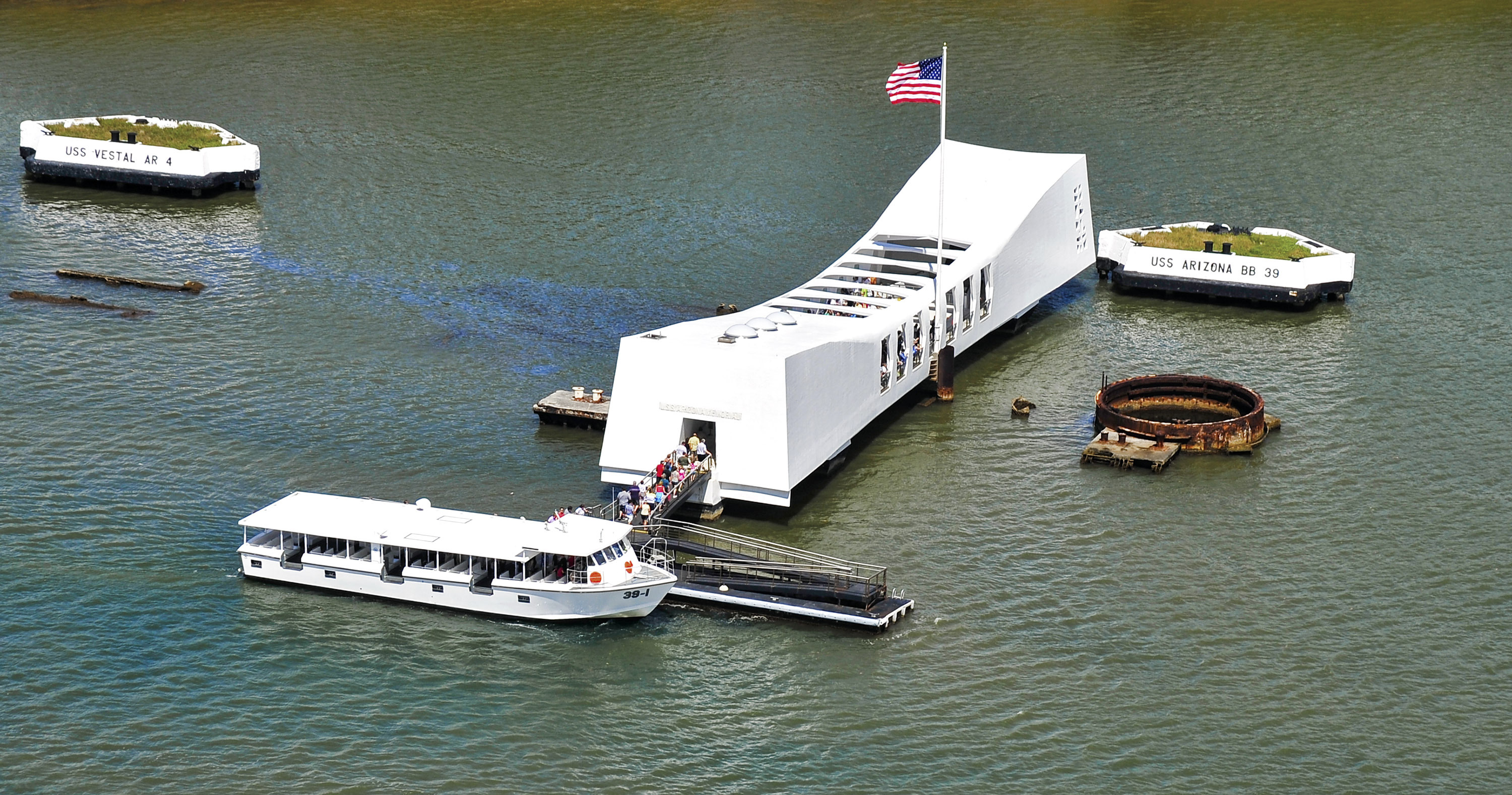
The USS Arizona Memorial and the mooring quays of Battleship Row, at Pearl Harbor in Hawaii

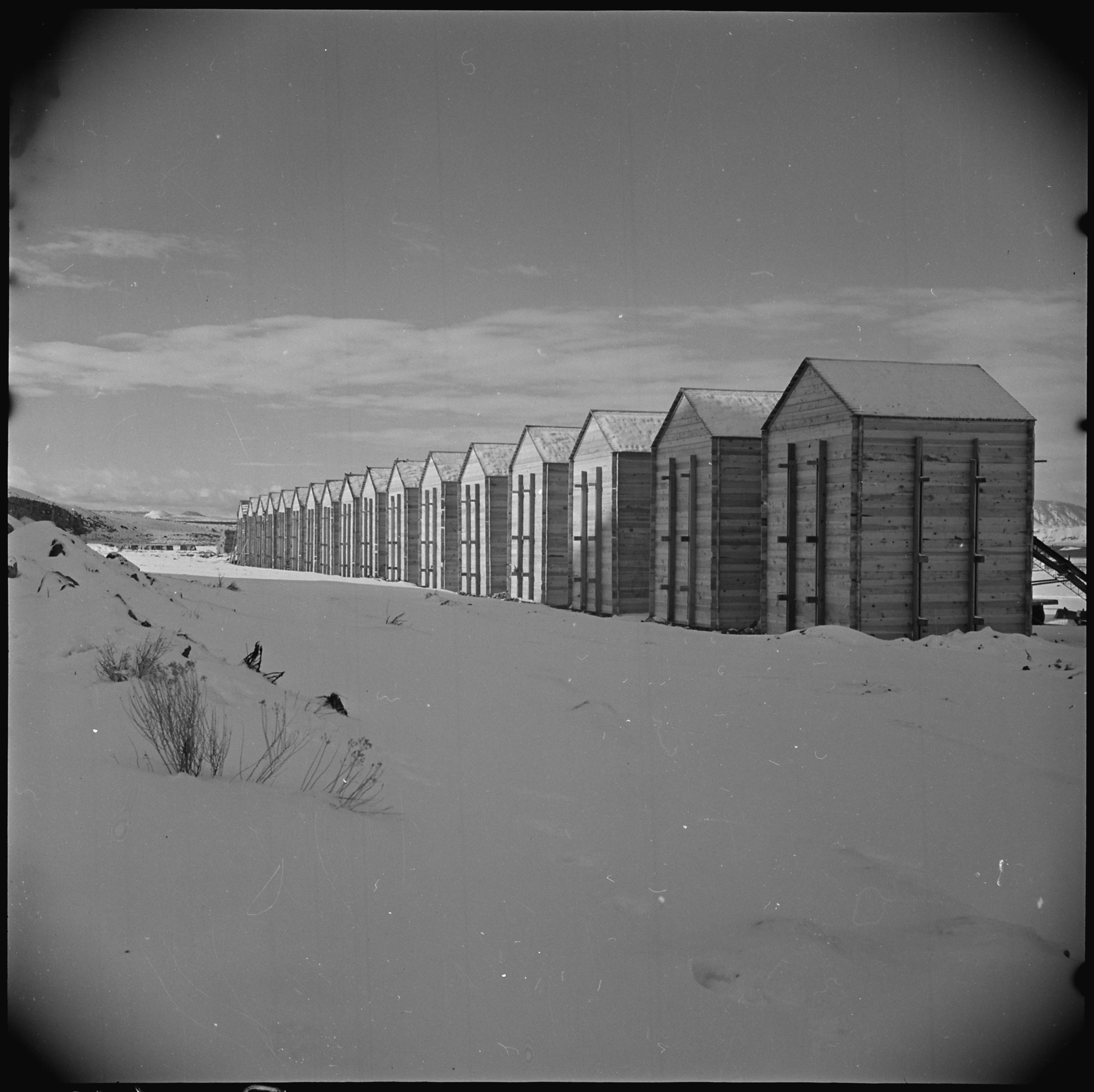
Granaries at Tule Lake Unit, Modoc County, California

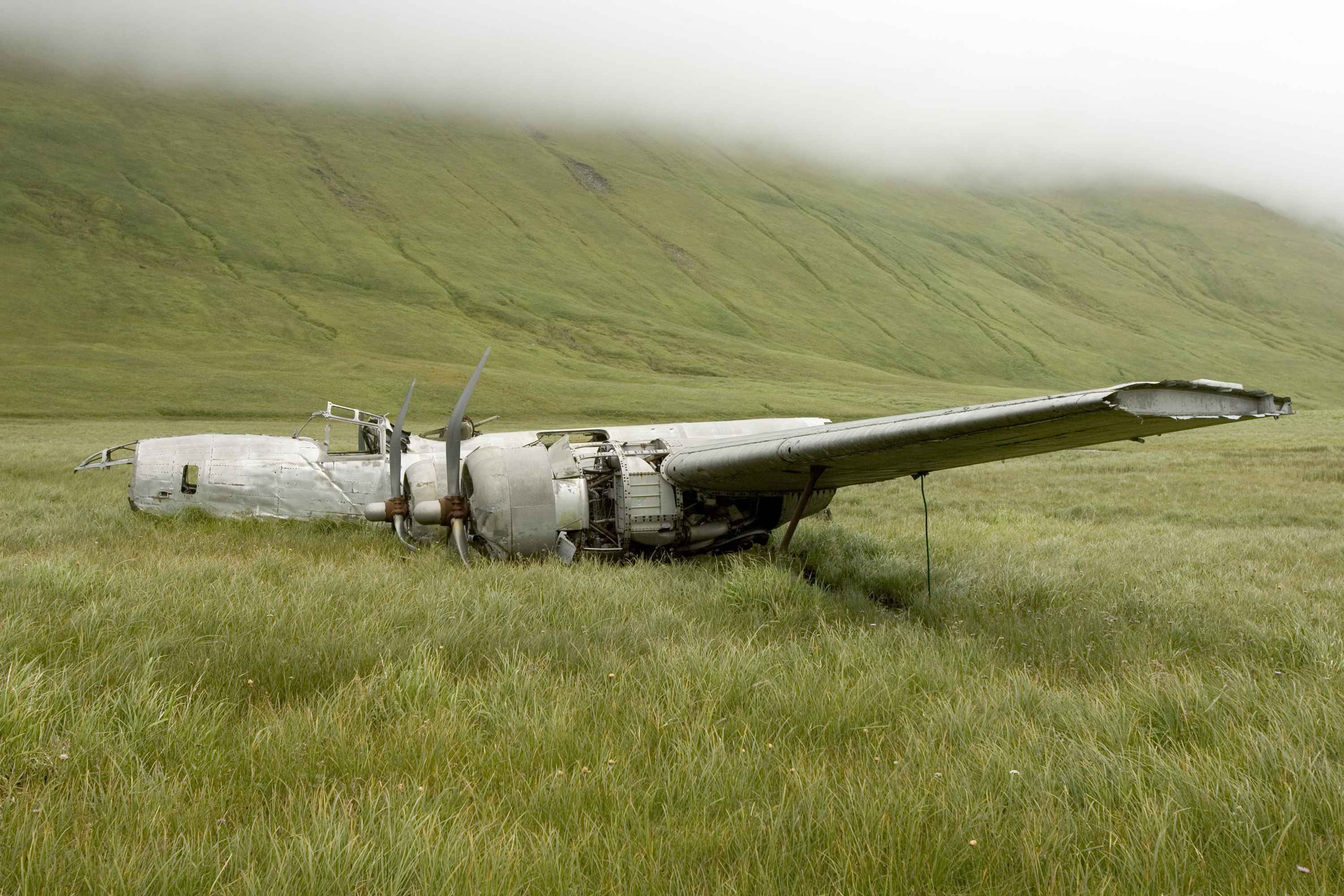
Atka B-24D Liberator on Atka Island, Alaska

The national monument included nine sites in three states, totaling 6,310 acres (2,550 ha):

Hawaii – sites administered by the National Park Service (21.3 acres). The actual shipwrecks of the Arizona, Utah, and Oklahoma were not a part of the monument and remained under the jurisdiction of the US Navy.

- USS Arizona Memorial and Visitor Center
- USS Utah Memorial
- USS Oklahoma Memorial
- Six Chief Petty Officer Bungalows on Ford Island
- Mooring Quays F6, F7, and F8, which formed part of Battleship Row

Alaska – sites administered by the Fish and Wildlife Service as part of Alaska Maritime National Wildlife Refuge

- Battle of Attu battlefield remnants on Attu Island, Aleutian Islands
- Japanese occupation of Kiska Island, Aleutian Islands
- Atka B-24D Liberator crash site on Atka Island, Aleutian Islands

California – site jointly administered by both NPS and FWS (1,391 acres)

- Tule Lake National Monument (on the site of an internment camp for Japanese Americans), in Modoc County, northeastern California. (41°53′22″N 121°22′29″W)

== See also ==
- List of national memorials of the United States
- List of national monuments of the United States
