= Japanese Occupation Site, Kiska Island =

- U.S. National Register of Historic Places
- U.S. National Historic Landmark
- Alaska Heritage Resources Survey
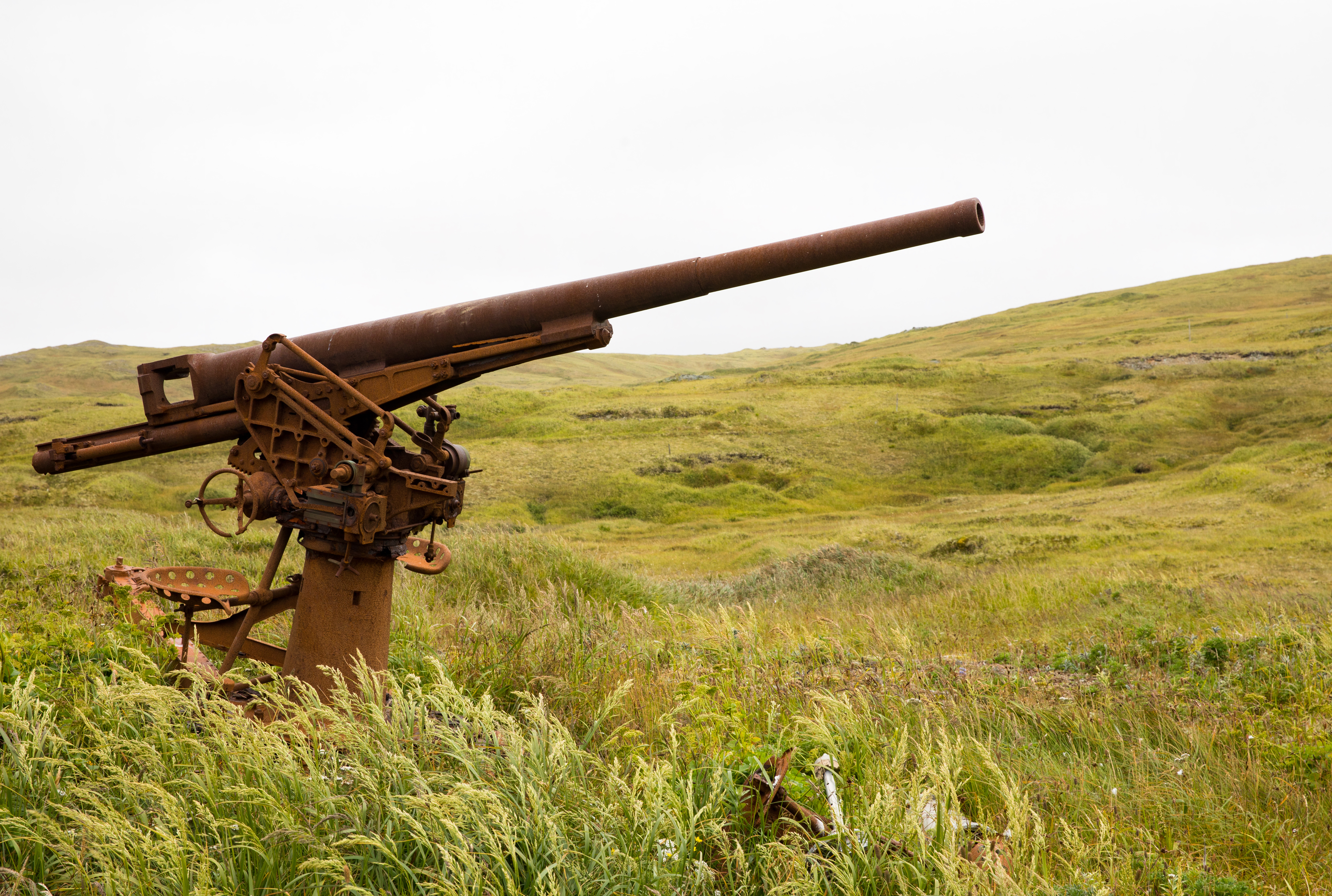
- Rusted remains of a Japanese 75mm gun on Kiska, now protected as part of the Alaska Maritime National Wildlife Refuge

- Location within Alaska
- Location: Aleutian Islands, Alaska, United States
- Coordinates: 51°59′5″N 177°31′46″E
- Area: 48,900 acres (19,800 ha)
- Built: 1942
- NRHP reference No.: 85002732

Significant dates
- Added to NRHP: February 4, 1985
- Designated NHL: February 4, 1985
- Designated AHRS: November 24, 1972

The Japanese Occupation Site on Kiska island (along with Attu Island) in the Rat Islands group of the Aleutian Islands of Alaska is where the Imperial Japanese Navy attacked and occupied the island in World War II, as one of the only two enemy invasion sites in North America during the war. The Japanese built defenses and other infrastructure on the island before abandoning it in 1943 after losing the Battle of Attu. American and Canadian forces reoccupied the abandoned island, and departed the island in 1946. Now a part of the Alaska Maritime National Wildlife Refuge, the central portion of the island, where these military activities were concentrated, was designated a National Historic Landmark in 1985. The site is part of the Aleutian Islands World War II National Monument.

== History ==
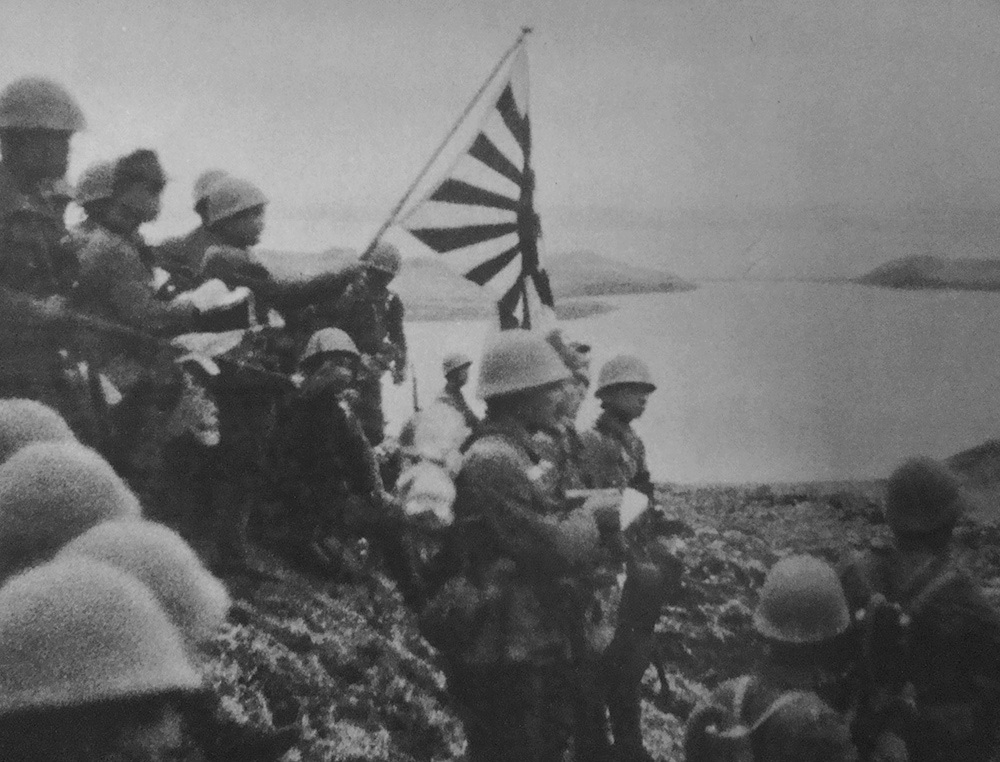
Japanese troops raising flag after invasion

Kiska is a small island near the western end of the Aleutian Islands. Although it is regularly subject to stormy weather and fog, it features one of finest harbors in the area. At the time of World War II, Kiska was occupied by United States Navy weather station with a complement of ten men. On June 6–7, 1942, in actions designed to roughly coordinate with their attack on Midway Island, Japanese forces occupied both Kiska and Attu against no opposition. Although they had originally planned to withdraw from both islands before the onset of winter, the Japanese high command decided to hold them. Both islands were fortified, and Kiska was made their administrative center for further operations in the Aleutian Islands Campaign. On Kiska, they built an airfield, a series of coastal and antiaircraft defenses, a submarine base, seaplane base, and quarters for troops. Naval facilities were concentrated on the northwestern shore of Kiska Harbor, with army facilities at Gertrude Cove. Dummy defenses were constructed all over the island, while real defenses were concentrated around the main bases and at the North Head of Kiska Harbor.

The Japanese invasion eventually brought an American response. The United States Army Air Forces engaged in bombing campaigns that increased in severity as airfields closer to Kiska were built, and Japanese shipping was harried by U.S. naval ships and submarines. Then, in twenty days of battle in May 1943, United States Army troops retook Attu. The Japanese consequently stepped up their fortifications on Kiska, but abandoned the island on July 28, having never finished construction of the airfield. Allied forces, unaware of the Japanese withdrawal, arrived in force on August 15. In an operation in which 92 men were killed and 221 wounded by causes including friendly fire and a Japanese sea mine, the island was occupied. Among the items left behind by the Japanese were three disabled ships on the beaches of Kiska Harbor, one at Gertrude Cove, and a sunken I-class submarine at the site of the submarine base. Allied military changes included completion of the airfield runways and the installation of further defenses. Allied forces withdrew from the island in 1946.

When inventoried by the U.S. Army in 1976, surviving elements of the Japanese occupation included the submarine pen, a number of machine gun and antiaircraft gun emplacements, the wrecked freighter Nozima Maru, a midget submarine, and a structure that served as officers' quarters.

Kiska Island is now protected as part of the Alaska Maritime National Wildlife Refuge, and authorization is required to visit the island. The central portion of the island, where the Japanese facilities were concentrated, and where the Allied landing took place, was designated a National Historic Landmark and listed on the National Register of Historic Places in 1985. Five sites totaling 2,345 acres (9.49 km^{2}) area part of Aleutian Islands World War II National Monument.

== See also ==
- List of National Historic Landmarks in Alaska
- National Register of Historic Places listings in Aleutians West Census Area, Alaska
- Aleutian Islands World War II National Monument
