= Atka B-24D Liberator =

- U.S. National Register of Historic Places
- Alaska Heritage Resources Survey
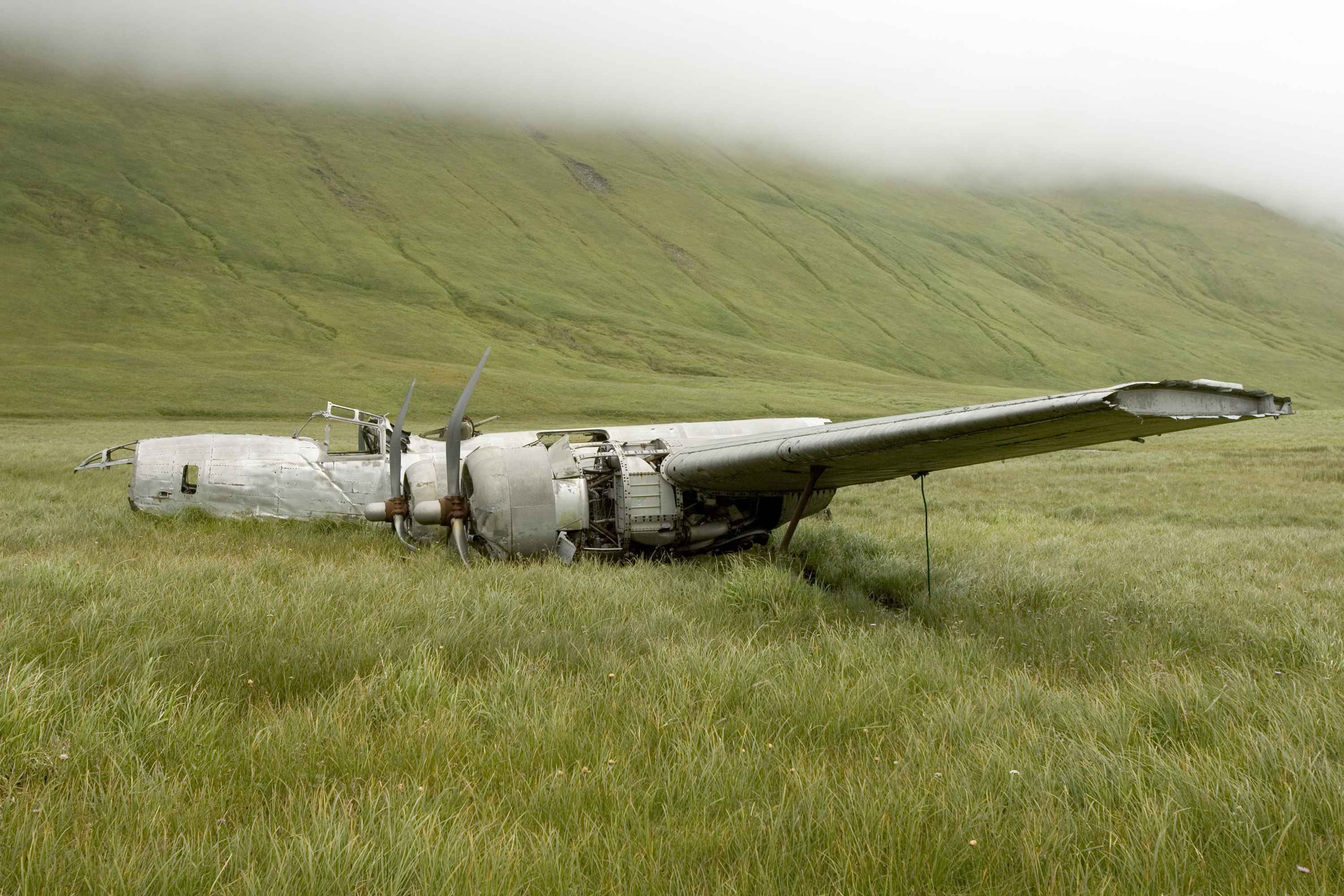

- Location within Alaska
- Nearest city: Atka, Alaska
- Coordinates: 52°1′49.6″N 175°8′13″W
- Area: less than one acre
- Architect: Consolidated Aircraft
- NRHP reference No.: 79000407
- AHRS No.: ATK-036
- Added to NRHP: 26 July 1979

The Atka B-24D Liberator is a derelict bomber on Atka Island in the Aleutian Islands of Alaska. The Consolidated B-24D Liberator was deliberately crash-landed on the island on 9 December 1942, and is one of only eight surviving D-model Liberators (including partial and derelict aircraft). The aircraft, serial number 40-2367, was built in 1941, and was serving on weather reconnaissance duty when it was prevented from landing at any nearby airfields due to poor weather conditions. The only injury resulting from the crash was a fractured collarbone sustained by Brigadier General William E. Lynd.

The wreck site was listed on the National Register of Historic Places in 1979. In 2008 it was included as part of the World War II Valor in the Pacific National Monument, redesignated Aleutian Islands World War II National Monument in 2019.

== See also ==
- List of surviving Consolidated B-24 Liberators
- National Register of Historic Places listings in Aleutians West Census Area, Alaska
