= Atka Airport =

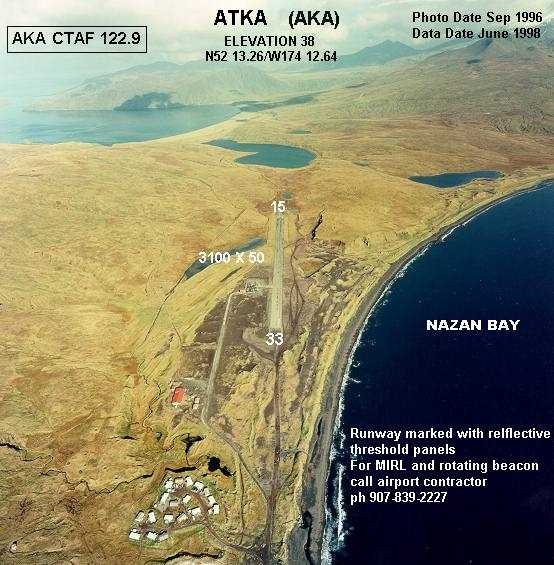
- IATA: AKB; ICAO: PAAK; FAA LID: AKA

Summary
- Airport type: Public
- Owner: Alaska DOT&PF - Central Region
- Serves: Atka, Alaska
- Location: Atka Island
- Elevation AMSL: 57 ft (17 m)
- Coordinates: 52°13′14″N 174°12′22″W

Map
- Location of airport in Alaska

Runways
Direction	Length		Surface
Direction	ft	m	Surface
16/34	4,500	1,372	Asphalt

Statistics (2015)
- Aircraft operations: 156
- Based aircraft: 0
- Passengers: 623
- Freight: 86,000 lbs
- Source: Federal Aviation Administration

Atka Airport (IATA: AKB, ICAO: PAAK, FAA LID: AKA, formerly 40A) is a state-owned, public use airport located two nautical miles (4 km) north of the central business district of Atka, a city on Atka Island in the U.S. state of Alaska. Scheduled commercial airline passenger service is subsidized by the Essential Air Service program.

As per Federal Aviation Administration (FAA) records, the airport had 321 passenger boardings (enplanements) in calendar year 2008, 406 enplanements in 2009, and 322 in 2010. It is included in the National Plan of Integrated Airport Systems for 2011–2015, which categorized it as a general aviation facility (the commercial service category requires at least 2,500 enplanements per year).

Although most U.S. airports use the same three-letter location identifier for the FAA and IATA, this airport is assigned AKA by the FAA and AKB by the IATA. The airport's ICAO identifier is PAAK.

== Facilities and aircraft ==
Atka Airport covers an area of 226 acres (91 ha) at an elevation of 57 feet (17 m) above mean sea level. It has one runway designated 16/34 with an asphalt surface measuring 4,500 by 100 feet (1,372 x 30 m).

For the 12-month period ending September 30, 2009, the airport had 550 aircraft operations, an average of 45 per month: 54.5% air taxi and 45.5% scheduled commercial.

== Airlines and destinations ==
Airlines	Destinations
Grant Aviation	Unalaska/Dutch Harbor

=== Statistics ===
Carrier shares: August 2019 – July 2020
Carrier	Passengers (arriving and departing)
Grant	350(100.00%)

Top domestic destinations: August 2019 – July 2020
Rank	City	Airport	Passengers
1	Unalaska/Dutch Harbor, AK	Unalaska Airport (DUT)	170

== See also ==
- List of airports in Alaska

== Other sources ==
- Essential Air Service documents (Docket DOT-OST-1995-363) from the U.S. Department of Transportation:
  - Order 2004-6-20: re-selecting Peninsula Airways to provide essential air service at Atka and Nikolski, Alaska, at annual subsidy rates of $336,303 and $173,603 per year, respectively, for the period ending June 30, 2006.
  - Order 2006-5-21: re-selecting Alaska Airlines to provide essential air service at Adak, Alaska, at an annual subsidy rate of $1,393,384, and Peninsula Airways for $449,605 at Atka and $314,694 at Nikolski. The three rates extend through June 30, 2008.
  - Order 2008-3-36: re-selecting Alaska Airlines to provide essential air service at Adak, Alaska, at an annual subsidy rate of $1,483,122, and Peninsula Airways for $513,803 at Atka and $469,786 at Nikolski. The three rates extend through June 30, 2010.
  - Order 2010-7-9: re-selecting Alaska Airlines to provide essential air service (EAS) at Adak, Alaska, at an annual subsidy rate of $1,675,703, and Peninsula Airways, Inc., for $290,780 at Atka and $639,008 at Nikolski. The three rates extend through June 30, 2012.
  - Order 2012-5-20 (May 23, 2012): selecting Grant Aviation, Inc., to provide essential air service (EAS) at Atka, Alaska, for $842,574 the first year and $822,445 the second year, and at Nikolski, Alaska, for $331,431 the first year and $324,998 the second year.
