= Oglodak Island =

Alaskan island in the Bering Sea

- Island
- Location within Alaska
- Coordinates: 51°59′03″N 175°27′17″W
- Country: United States
- State: Alaska
- Archipelago: Andreanof Islands of the Aleutian Islands

Area
  - Total: 1.4 sq mi (3.5 km^{2})

Population (2008)
  - Total: 0
  - Density: 0/sq mi (0/km^{2})

Oglodak Island (Russian: Оглодак остров) is an island in the U.S. State of Alaska. It is located in the Aleutians West Census Area, which encompasses most of the Aleutian Island chain. The island is currently uninhabited and has an area of roughly 1.5 square miles (3.9 km^{2}). The island is 1.19 miles (1.92 km) long and 2.3 miles (3.7 km) wide. It is approximately 4.5 miles (7.2 km) southwest of Cape Kigun.
