= Atka, Alaska =

Atka Atx̂ax̂
- City
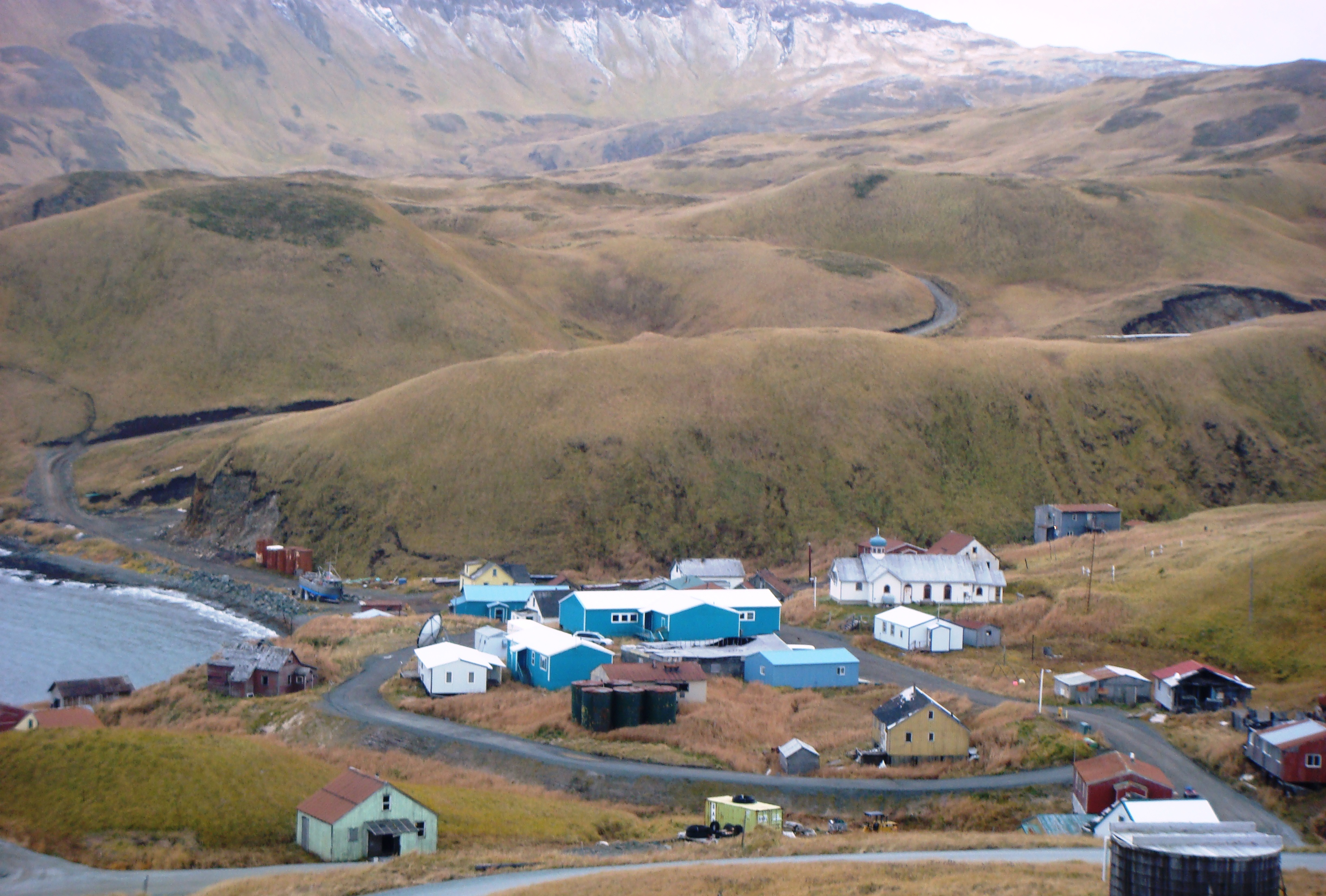
- Village of Atka

- Location in Alaska Atka (North America)
- Coordinates: 52°11′57″N 174°12′48″W
- Country: United States
- State: Alaska
- Census Area: Aleutians West
- Incorporated: 1988

Government
  - Mayor: Crystal Dushkin
  - State senator: Lyman Hoffman (D)
  - State rep.: Bryce Edgmon (I)

Area
  - Total: 36.40 sq mi (94.28 km^{2})
  - Land: 8.47 sq mi (21.93 km^{2})
  - Water: 27.93 sq mi (72.35 km^{2})
- Elevation: 59 ft (18 m)

Population (2020)
  - Total: 53
  - Density: 6.3/sq mi (2.42/km^{2})
- Time zone: UTC-10 (Hawaii-Aleutian (HST))
  - Summer (DST): UTC-9 (HDT)
- ZIP code: 99547
- Area code: 907
- FIPS code: 02-04210
- GNIS feature ID: 1418170

Atka (Aleut: Atx̂ax̂, Russian: Атка) is a small city located on the east side of Atka Island, in Aleutians West Census Area, Alaska, United States. The population was 53 at the 2020 census, down from 61 in 2010.

The population of Atka is nearly entirely Aleut (Unangan). The major industry is fishing.

== Geography ==
Atka is located at 52°11′57″N 174°12′48″W (52.199271, -174.213398).

According to the U.S. Census Bureau, the hamlet has a total area of 36.2 square miles (94 km^{2}), of which, 8.7 square miles (23 km^{2}) of it is land and 27.4 square miles (71 km^{2}) of it (75.81%) is water.

Atka is formed by a shield volcano, with a number of outlets. The highest point on Atka is Korovin Volcano, which last erupted in 2006.

== Demographics ==
Historical population
Census	Pop.	Note	%±
1880	236		—
1890	132		−44.1%
1920	56		—
1930	103		83.9%
1940	89		−13.6%
1950	85		−4.5%
1960	119		40.0%
1970	88		−26.1%
1980	93		5.7%
1990	73		−21.5%
2000	92		26.0%
2010	61		−33.7%
2020	53		−13.1%
U.S. Decennial Census

Atka first appeared on the 1880 U.S. Census as the unincorporated Aleut village of "Nazan". It had 236 residents, of which 220 were Aleut, 14 were Creole (Mixed Russian & Native) and 2 were White. In 1890, it returned as Atka, with 132 residents, of which 116 were native, 15 were Creole and 1 White. It did not appear again under the name "Atka" on the census until 1920, and in every successive census. It was made a census-designated place (CDP) in 1980 and formally incorporated in 1988.

=== 2020 census ===
As of the 2020 census, Atka had a population of 53. The median age was 39.2 years. 18.9% of residents were under the age of 18 and 20.8% of residents were 65 years of age or older. For every 100 females there were 120.8 males, and for every 100 females age 18 and over there were 168.8 males age 18 and over.

0.0% of residents lived in urban areas, while 100.0% lived in rural areas.

There were 14 households in Atka, of which 21.4% had children under the age of 18 living in them. Of all households, 21.4% were married-couple households, 64.3% were households with a male householder and no spouse or partner present, and 14.3% were households with a female householder and no spouse or partner present. About 57.1% of all households were made up of individuals and 21.4% had someone living alone who was 65 years of age or older.

There were 38 housing units, of which 63.2% were vacant. The homeowner vacancy rate was 14.3% and the rental vacancy rate was 47.4%.

Racial composition as of the 2020 census
Race	Number	Percent
White	0	0.0%
Black or African American	1	1.9%
American Indian and Alaska Native	50	94.3%
Asian	0	0.0%
Native Hawaiian and Other Pacific Islander	0	0.0%
Some other race	0	0.0%
Two or more races	2	3.8%
Hispanic or Latino (of any race)	0	0.0%

=== 2000 census ===
As of the census of 2000, there were 92 people, 32 households, and 20 families residing in the hamlet. The population density was 10.5 inhabitants per square mile (4.1/km^{2}). There were 41 housing units at an average density of 4.7 units per square mile (1.8 units/km^{2}). The racial makeup of the city was 80.43% Native American, 6.52% White, 1.09% Asian, 1.09% Pacific Islander, and 10.87% from two or more races. 1.09% of the population were Hispanic or Latino of any race.

Of the 32 households, 40.6% had children under the age of 18 living with them, 37.5% were married couples living together, 9.4% had a female householder with no husband present, and 34.4% were non-families. 28.1% of all households were made up of individuals, and 9.4% had someone living alone who was 65 years of age or older. The average household size was 2.69 and the average family size was 3.33.

In the city the population was spread out, with 30.4% under the age of 18, 7.6% from 18 to 24, 29.3% from 25 to 44, 23.9% from 45 to 64, and 8.7% who were 65 years of age or older. The median age was 36 years. For every 100 females, there were 100.0 males. For every 100 females age 18 and over, there were 106.5 males.

The median income for a household in the hamlet was $30,938, and the median income for a family was $34,375. Males had a median income of $28,750 versus $33,438 for females. The per capita income for the city was $17,080. There were no families and 7.5% of the population living below the poverty line, including no under eighteens and 26.7% of those over 64.

Atka Airport is the island's only airstrip.

== Education ==
Atka is served by the Aleutian Region Schools. The Yakov E. Netsvetov School serves grades K-12. The school has two teachers, one for the elementary grades and one for the secondary grades. In the 2019–20 school year, it had 10 enrolled students.

== See also ==
- Atka Airport
