= Atka Island =

- Island
- Location within Alaska
- Coordinates: 52°08′17″N 174°26′43″W
- Country: United States
- State: Alaska
- Archipelago: Andreanof Islands of the Aleutian Islands
- Census Area: Aleutians West Census Area

Area
  - Total: 404.93 sq mi (1,048.8 km^{2})
  - Land: 404.6 sq mi (1,048 km^{2})
  - Water: 0.33 sq mi (0.85 km^{2})

Population (2000)
  - Total: 95
  - Density: 0.23/sq mi (0.091/km^{2})
- ZIP code: 99547

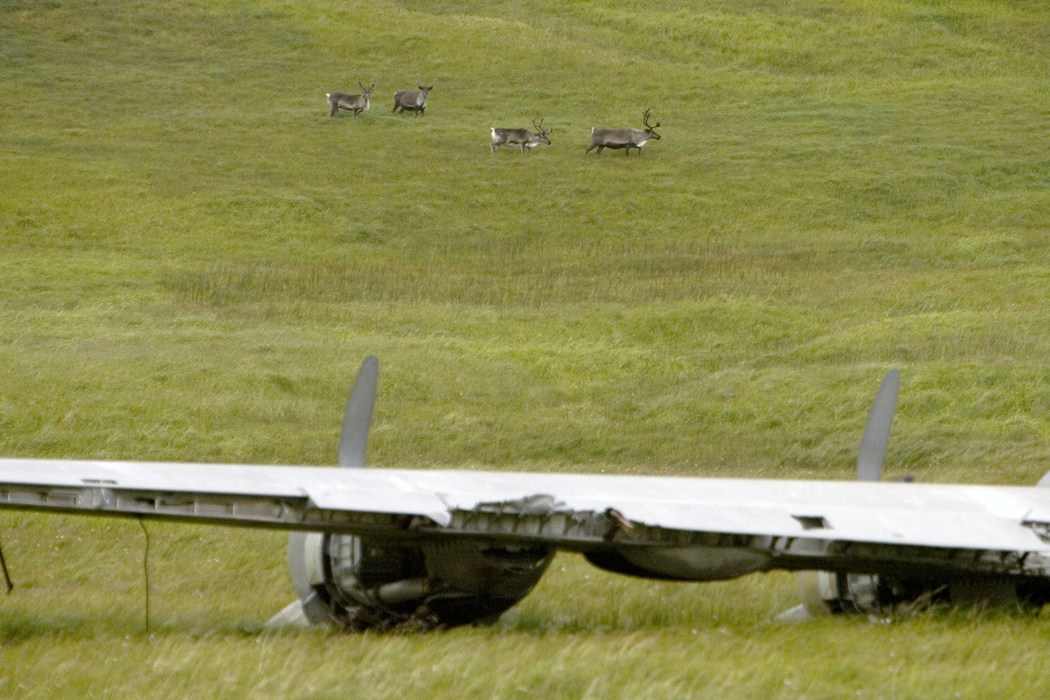
Atka Island reindeer and World War II aircraft

Atka Island (Aleut: Atx̂ax̂, Russian: Атка остров) is the largest island in the Andreanof Islands of the Aleutian Islands of Alaska. The island is 50 miles (80 km) east of Adak Island. It is 65 miles (105 km) long and 2–20 miles (3–30 km) wide with a land area of 404.6 square miles (1,048 km^{2}), making it the 22nd largest island in the United States. The northeast of Atka Island contains the Korovin volcano which reaches a peak of 5,030 feet (1,533 m). Oglodak Island is located 3.4 miles (3.0 nmi; 5.5 km) off Cape Kigun, Atka's westernmost point.

The city of Atka, Alaska is on the east side of the island. The 2000 census population of the island was 95 persons, almost all in the city of Atka.

After the second World War, survivors from Attu Island were relocated 200 miles (170 nmi; 320 km), to Atka.

On December 5, 2008, President George W. Bush created the World War II Valor in the Pacific National Monument. A crashed B-24 Liberator on Atka is one of the nine sites included in the monument. As of July 2021 Atka is having a new modular medical clinic and quarantine shelter with a morgue being erected. This is through grants of the USDA and other parties such as native corp AHTNA & Whitley Manufacturing to serve the tribe.

== Education ==
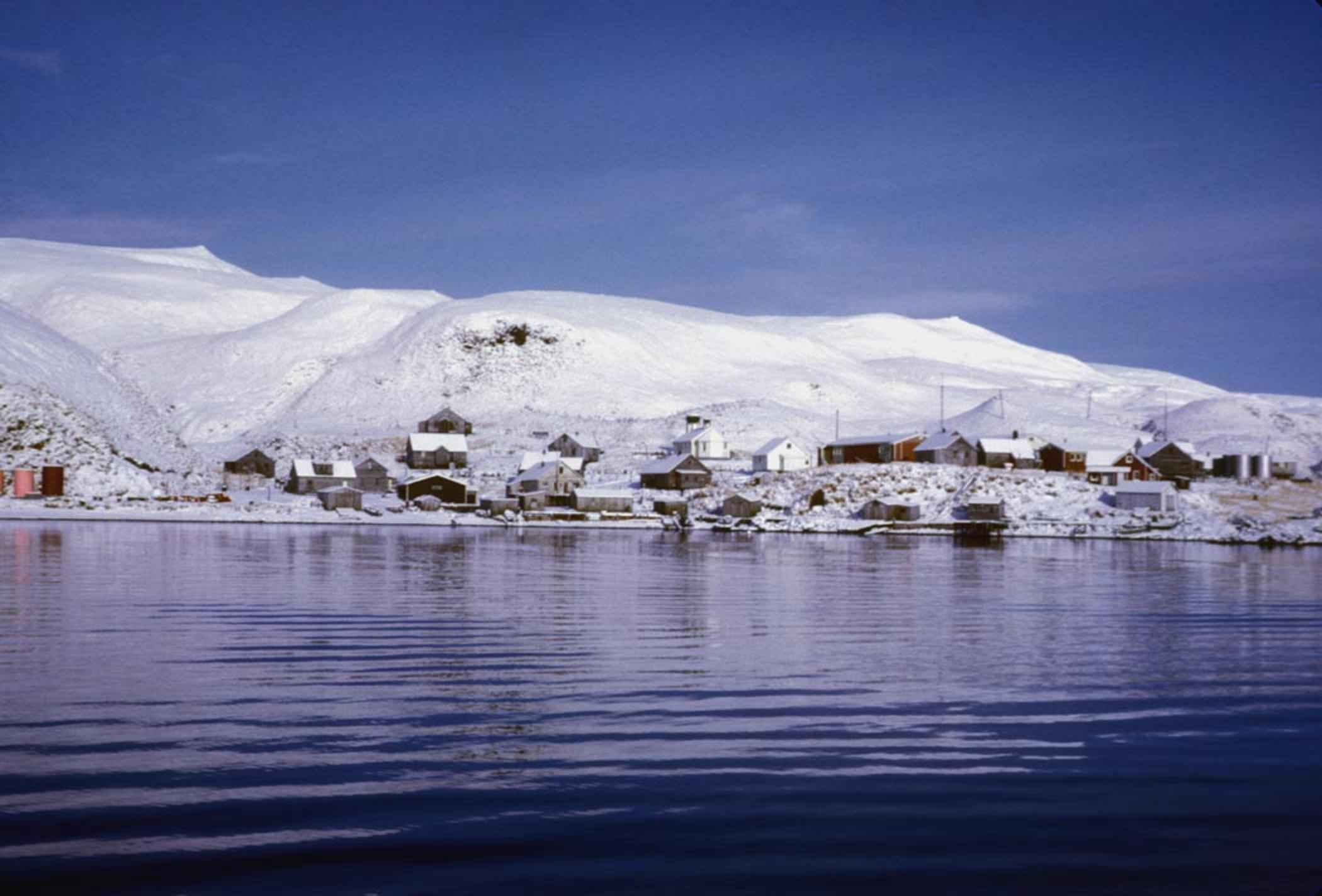
Atka village in winter

Atka is served by the Aleutian Region Schools.

The Yakov E. Netsvetov School, named after Jacob Netsvetov, serves grades K-12. It is the only school of the Aleutian Region School District.
