= Kiska =

Island in the Aleutian Islands, Alaska, USA

Native name: Qisxa
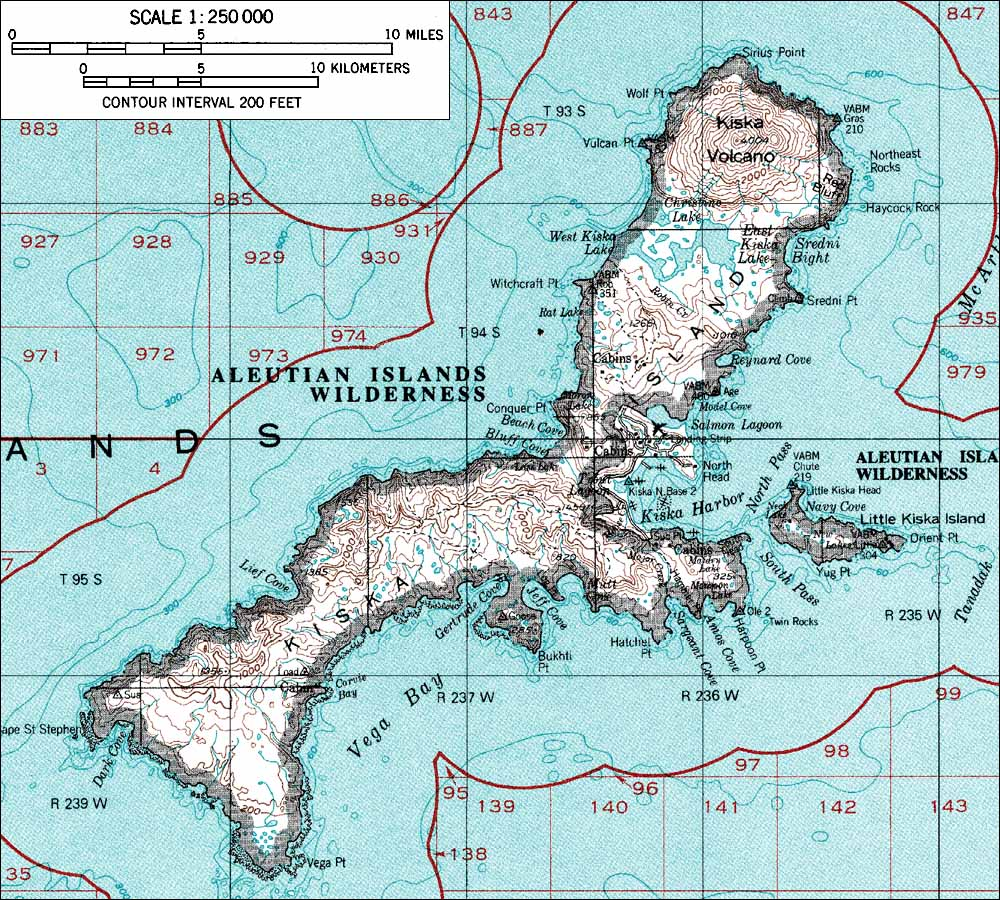
- A topographical map of Kiska
- Interactive map of Kiska

Geography
- Coordinates: 51°57′51″N 177°27′36″E
- Archipelago: Rat Islands group of the Aleutian Islands
- Area: 107.22 sq mi (277.7 km^{2})
- Length: 22 mi (35 km)
- Width: 1.5 mi (2.4 km) - 6 mi (10 km)
- Highest elevation: 4,004 ft (1220.4 m)
- Highest point: Kiska Volcano

Administration
- United States
- State: Alaska
- Census Area: Aleutians West Census Area

Demographics
- Population: 0 (2010)

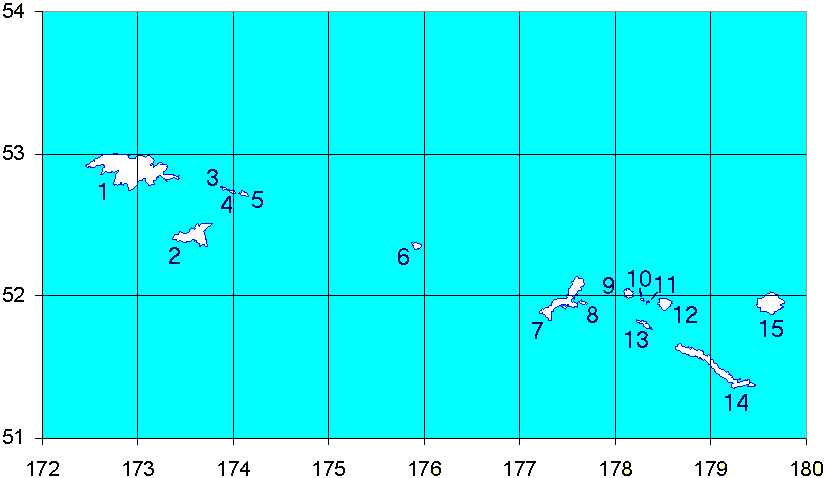
Map of the western Aleutian Islands. Kiska is shown as Island #7; Attu Island is shown as Island #1.

Kiska (Aleut: Qisxa, Russian: Кыска) is one of the Rat Islands, a group of the Aleutian Islands of Alaska. It is about 22 miles (35 km) long and varies in width from 1.5 to 6 miles (2.4 to 9.7 km). It is part of Aleutian Islands Wilderness and as such, special permission is required to visit it. The island has no permanent population.

== History ==
=== European discovery (1741) ===
In 1741 while returning from his second voyage at sea during the Great Northern Expedition, Danish-born Russian explorer Vitus Bering made the first European discovery of most of the Aleutian Islands, including Kiska. Georg Wilhelm Steller, a naturalist-physician aboard Bering's ship, wrote:

On 25 October 1741 we had very clear weather and sunshine, but even so it hailed at various times in the afternoon. We were surprised in the morning to discover a large tall island at 51° to the north of us.

Prior to European contact, Kiska Island had been densely populated by native peoples for thousands of years.

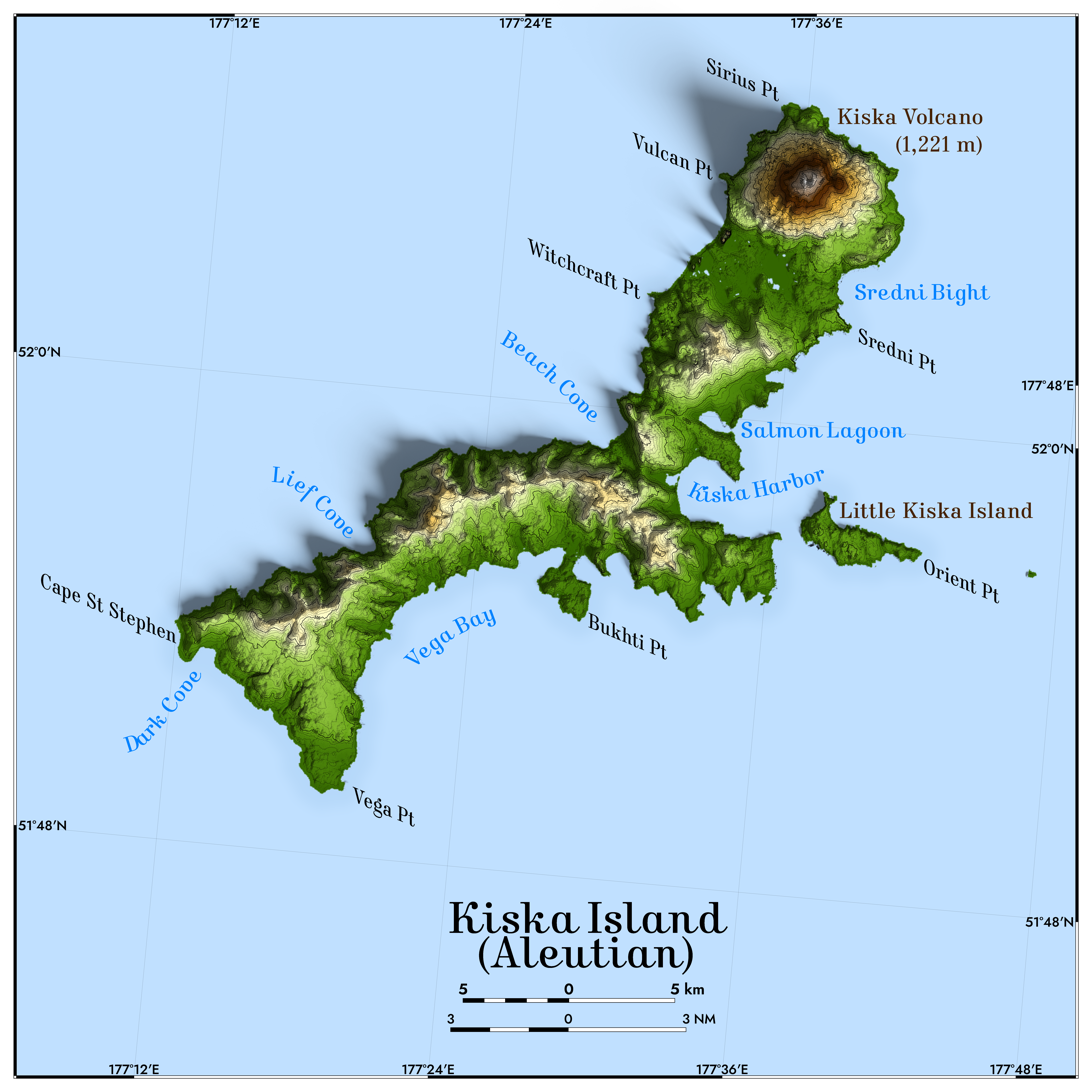
Topographic map of Kiska Island

=== After discovery (1741–1939) ===
Kiska, and the other Rat Islands, were reached by independent Russian traders in the 1750s. After the initial exploitation of the sea otter population, Russians rarely visited the island as interest shifted further east. Years would frequently pass without a single ship landing.

Starting in 1775, Kiska, the Aleutian Islands, and mainland Alaska became fur trading outposts for the Russian-American Company managed by Grigory Shelekhov.

In 1867, U.S. Secretary of State William H. Seward negotiated the purchase of Alaska with the Russian Empire. Kiska was included in the purchase.

=== World War II (1939–1945) ===
The Allied invasion of Kiska, August 15, 1943

The Japanese No. 3 Special Landing Party and 500 marines went ashore at Kiska on June 6, 1942, as a separate campaign concurrent with the Japanese plan for the Battle of Midway. The Japanese captured the sole inhabitants of the island: a small United States Navy Weather Detachment consisting of ten men, including a lieutenant, along with their dog. (One member of the detachment escaped for 50 days. Starving, thin, and extremely cold, he eventually surrendered to the Japanese.) The next day the Japanese captured Attu Island.

The military importance of this frozen, difficult-to-supply island was questionable, but the psychological impact upon the Americans of losing U.S. soil to a foreign enemy for the first time since the War of 1812 was tangible. During the winter of 1942–43, the Japanese reinforced and fortified the islands—not necessarily to prepare for an island-hopping operation across the Aleutians, but to prevent a U.S. operation across the Kuril Islands. The U.S. Navy began operations to deny Kiska supply which would lead to the Battle of the Komandorski Islands. During October 1942, American forces undertook seven bombing missions over Kiska, though two were aborted due to weather. Following the winter, Attu was recaptured, and bombing of Kiska resumed until a larger American force was allocated to defeat the expected Japanese garrison of 5,200 men. The Japanese, aware of the loss of Attu and the impending arrival of the larger Allied force, withdrew their troops on July 28 under the cover of fog, without being detected by the Allies.

On August 15, 1943, an invasion force consisting of 34,426 Allied troops, including elements of the US 7th Infantry Division, 4th Infantry Regiment, 87th Mountain Infantry Regiment, 5,300 Canadians (mainly the 13th Infantry Brigade from the 6th Canadian Infantry Division), with supporting units including two artillery units from the US 7th Infantry Division, 95 ships including three battleships and a heavy cruiser and 168 aircraft landed on Kiska in Operation Cottage, only to find the island abandoned.

Despite the lack of Japanese presence, Allied casualties during this invasion nevertheless numbered close to 200, either from bad weather, Japanese booby traps or friendly fire. As a result of the brief "friendly fire" engagement between U.S. and Canadian forces, 28 Americans and four Canadians were killed. There were an additional 130 casualties from trench foot. The destroyer USS Abner Read hit a mine, resulting in 87 casualties.

That night the Imperial Japanese Navy warships, thinking they were engaged by Americans, shelled and attempted to torpedo the island of Little Kiska where the Japanese soldiers were waiting to embark. Admiral Ernest King reported to the secretary of the Navy, Frank Knox, that the only things that remained on the island were dogs and freshly brewed coffee. Knox asked for an explanation and King responded, "The Japanese are very clever. Their dogs can brew coffee".

=== Since World War II ===
In 1985 the Japanese occupation site on the island was designated a National Historic Landmark and part of Aleutian Islands World War II National Monument. The island is also a part of the Alaska Maritime National Wildlife Refuge (AMNWR) and contains the largest colony of least auklets (over 1,160,000 birds) and crested auklets. Research biologists from Memorial University of Newfoundland have been studying the impact of introduced Norway rats on the seabirds of Kiska since 2001.

Much of the aftermath of World War II is still evident in Kiska. The slow erosion processes on the tundra have had little effect on the bomb craters still visible both from the ground and in satellite images on the hills surrounding the harbor. Numerous equipment dumps, tunnels (some concrete-lined), Japanese gun emplacements, shipwrecks, and other war relics can be found, all untouched since 1943.

In 1983, a memorial plaque was placed on Kiska by the 87th Mountain Infantry Regiment, inscribed:

To the men of Amphibious Task Force 9 who fell here August 1943 placed here August 1983 by 87th Mountain Infantry Regiment.

In September 1989, divers from the United States Navy rescue and salvage ship USS Safeguard (ARS-50) surveyed the wreck of the Imperial Japanese Navy submarine Ro-65, which sank in the harbor at Kiska with the loss of 19 lives on November 3, 1942.

On August 22, 2007, the submarine USS Grunion, which disappeared with a crew of 70 during World War II, was found in 1,000 metres (3,281 ft) of water off Kiska.

There were no alterations to the landscape since World War II including the traces of the war. Unexploded ammunition is scattered throughout the landscape.

=== In fiction ===
Renamed "Skira", the island was used as the setting for the Codemasters video game Operation Flashpoint: Dragon Rising. The fictionalized version of the island is relocated closer to Russia and China, but the island's topography is replicated almost exactly.

== Kiska Volcano ==
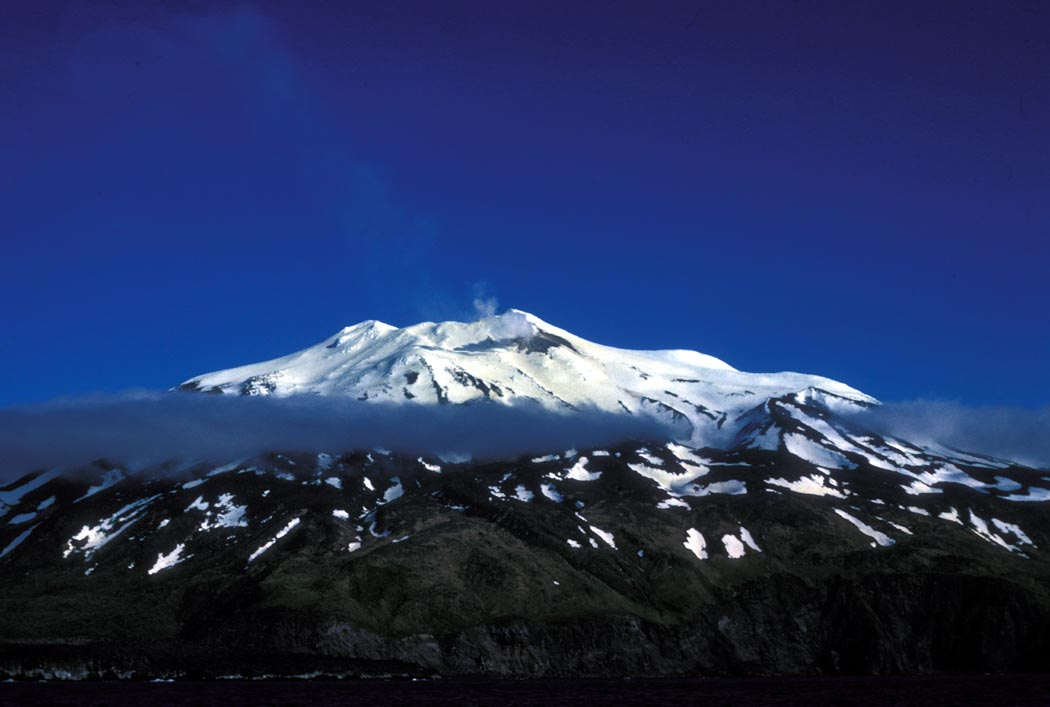
Kiska Volcano

Kiska Volcano (Qisxan Kamgii in Aleut) is an active stratovolcano, 5.3 by 4.0 mi (8.5 by 6.4 km) in diameter at its base and 4,006 feet (1,221 m) high, located on the northern end of Kiska Island.

On January 24, 1962, an explosive eruption occurred, accompanied by lava extrusion and the construction of a cinder cone about 98 feet (30 m) high at Sirius Point on the north flank of Kiska Volcano, 1.9 miles (3.1 km) from the summit of the main cone (Anchorage Daily News, January 30, 1962). A second eruption that produced a lava flow was reported to have occurred on March 18, 1964 (Bulletin of Volcanic Eruptions, 1964).

Since then, the volcano has emitted steam and ash plumes, as well as smaller lava flows.

== In Art ==
The island is the setting for Seiji Murayama's 1965 film Retreat From Kiska (太平洋奇跡の作戦 キスカ, Taiheiyō Kiseki no Sakusen: Kisuka).

== See also ==
- List of mountain peaks of North America
  - List of mountain peaks of the United States
    - List of mountain peaks of Alaska
- List of volcanoes in the United States
- Report from the Aleutians, a 1943 documentary about the bombing of Kiska during World War II
