= James Leroy Bondsteel =

United States Army Medal of Honor recipient

James L. Bondsteel
- Medal of Honor recipient.
- Born: July 18, 1947; Jackson, Michigan, U.S.
- Died: April 9, 1987 (aged 39); Glenn Highway, Alaska, U.S.
- Burial place: Fort Richardson National Cemetery, Joint Base Elmendorf-Richardson, Anchorage, Alaska
- Military career
- Allegiance: United States of America
- Branch: United States Marine Corps; United States Army
- Service years: 1965–1985
- Rank: Master Sergeant
- Nickname: Buddha
- Unit: 1st Infantry Division
- Conflicts: Vietnam War; *Operation Toan Thang III
- Awards: Medal of Honor; Soldier's Medal; Bronze Star; Purple Heart (2)
- Other work: Counselor

James Leroy Bondsteel (July 18, 1947 – April 9, 1987) was an American soldier of the United States Army who served during the Vietnam War, where he earned the Medal of Honor. His Medal of Honor, awarded in November 1973, was the last presented by President Richard Nixon.

== Biography ==
James Leroy Bondsteel was born on July 18, 1947, in Jackson, Michigan, to Betty Jean Daisy and her fiancé, Kenneth Bondsteel.

Bondsteel enlisted in the U.S. Marine Corps after graduating from Jonesville High School in Jonesville, Michigan, and was posted to Korea where he contributed his time to an orphanage. When Bondsteel's contract in the Marine Corps concluded, he then enlisted the United States Army, serving until his retirement in 1985. In 1969, Bondsteel was deployed to Vietnam with Company A, 2nd Battalion, 2nd Infantry Regiment, 1st Infantry Division (Army) where he received the Medal of Honor for his actions occurring May 24, 1969, near An Lộc, South Vietnam during Operation Toan Thang III. During his time in Vietnam, Bondsteel learned to speak Vietnamese and could differentiate between different regional dialects.

After leaving Vietnam, Bondsteel was stationed in West Germany from 1970 to 1973. He was also stationed at numerous other postings until his retirement in 1985. In total, he accrued more than 20-years of service. After having achieved the rank of Master Sergeant, he retired honorably from the Army. He then went on to work for the Veterans Affairs as a counselor at the regional office in Anchorage, Alaska.

Bondsteel lived in Willow, Alaska with his wife Elaine and his daughters, Angel and Rachel.

Bondsteel died on the Knik River bridge (later named in his honor) of the Glenn Highway in 1987 when a trailer full of logs came unhooked from the transport which was pulling it and slammed into the front of his AMC Spirit. Bondsteel is buried in Alaska at Fort Richardson National Cemetery.

A tree was placed at Freedoms Foundation Park at Valley Forge, Pennsylvania, in his honor.

There is a monument to honor Bondsteel at the Alaska Veterans Memorial at Byers Lake on the Parks Highway in the Denali State Park.

Camp Bondsteel, the main U.S. Army base in Kosovo, is named in Bondsteel's honor.

Bondsteel, along with three other Medal of Honor recipients who were from the area, is honored on the Medal of Honor Memorial in Jackson County, Michigan, dedicated on November 22, 2011.

== Medal of Honor citation ==
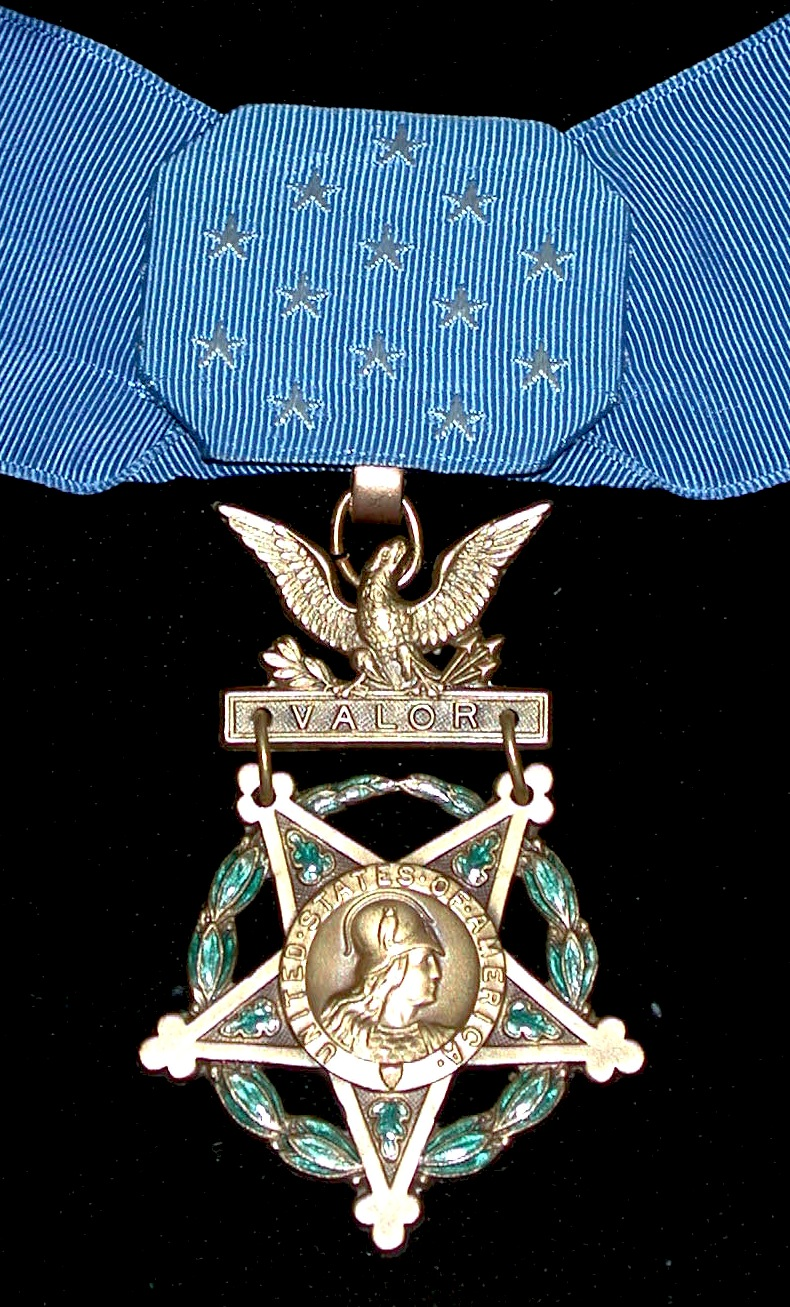

For conspicuous gallantry and intrepidity in action at the risk of his life above and beyond the call of duty. SSG James Bondsteel distinguished himself while serving as a platoon sergeant with Company A, near the village of Lang Sau. Company A was directed to assist a friendly unit which was endangered by intense fire from a North Vietnamese Battalion located in a heavily fortified base camp. SSG James Bondsteel quickly organized the men of his platoon into effective combat teams and spearheaded the attack by destroying 4 enemy occupied bunkers. He then raced some 200 meters under heavy enemy fire to reach an adjoining platoon which had begun to falter. After rallying this unit and assisting their wounded, SSG James Bondsteel returned to his own sector with critically needed munitions. Without pausing he moved to the forefront and destroyed 4 enemy occupied bunkers and a machine gun which had threatened his advancing platoon. Although painfully wounded by an enemy grenade, SSG James Bondsteel refused medical attention and continued his assault by neutralizing 2 more enemy bunkers nearby. While searching one of these emplacements SSG James Bondsteel narrowly escaped death when an enemy soldier detonated a grenade at close range. Shortly thereafter, he ran to the aid of a severely wounded officer and struck down an enemy soldier who was threatening the officer's life. SSG James Bondsteel then continued to rally his men and led them through the entrenched enemy until his company was relieved. His exemplary leadership and great personal courage throughout the 4-hour battle ensured the success of his own and nearby units, and resulted in the saving of numerous lives of his fellow soldiers. By individual acts of bravery he destroyed 10 enemy bunkers and accounted for a large toll of the enemy, including 2 key enemy commanders. His extraordinary heroism at the risk of his life was in the highest traditions of military service and reflect great credit upon him, his unit, and the U.S. Army.

== See also ==
- List of Medal of Honor recipients for the Vietnam War
