= List of cemeteries in Alaska =

This is a list of cemeteries in Alaska.

Cemeteries in Alaska
Name	GNIS Feature ID and Link	Coordinates	Elevation	Municipality	Borough or Census Area
Anchorage Memorial Park	2752697	61°12′55″N 149°52′34″W	115 feet (35 m)	Anchorage	Anchorage
Bayview Cemetery	1420282	55°20′08″N 131°37′29″W	180 feet (55 m)	Ketchikan	Ketchikan Gateway
Birch Hill Cemetery	1397648	64°51′42″N 147°40′11″W	597 feet (182 m)	Fairbanks	Fairbanks North Star
Chief Situk Grave	1421020	59°27′07″N 139°34′11″W	20 feet (6.1 m)	Yakutat	Yakutat
Clay Street Cemetery	1397653	64°50′30″N 147°42′17″W	443 feet (135 m)	Fairbanks	Fairbanks North Star
Cleary Cemetery	2730872	65°5'32"N 147°24'31"W	989 feet (301 m)	Fairbanks	Fairbanks North Star
Evergreen Cemetery	2752702	58°18′17″N 134°25′25″W	56 feet (17 m)	Juneau	Juneau
Angelus Memorial Park	1416770	61°06′53″N 149°52′08″W	154 feet (47 m)	Anchorage	Anchorage
Fort Richardson National Cemetery	2061976	61°16′31″N 149°39′37″W	367 feet (112 m)	Anchorage	Anchorage
Hope Cemetery	1422646	60°55′01″N 149°37′23″W	125 feet (38 m)	Hope	Kenai Peninsula
Indian Cemetery	1403810	62°00′29″N 146°14′55″W	1,814 feet (553 m)	Tazlina Lake	Valdez-Cordova (CA)
Indian Cemetery	1403811	62°58′56″N 141°55′49″W	1,719 feet (524 m)	Northway	Southeast Fairbanks (CA)
Indian Cemetery	1403812	64°54′42″N 148°57′19″W	328 feet (100 m)	near Minto Lakes	Yukon-Koyukuk (CA)
Jensens Cemetery	1404111	64°46′16″N 165°26′51″W	682 feet (208 m)	Nome	Nome (CA)
Kuteha Indian Burial Grounds	1405092	58°12′36″N 134°11′09″W	128 feet (39 m)	Juneau	Juneau
Native Cemetery	1406869	65°02′24″N 151°32′08″W	220 feet (67 m)	Manley Hot Springs	Yukon-Koyukuk (CA)
Northern Lights Memorial Cemetery	1407252	64°52′44″N 147°52′35″W	722 feet (220 m)	Fairbanks	Fairbanks North Star
Palmer Pioneer Cemetery	1419622	61°36′29″N 149°05′34″W	249 feet (76 m)	Palmer	Matanuska-Susitna
Pleasant Valley Cemetery	2319071	64°52'40"N 146°53'06"W	679 feet (207 m)	Chena Hot Springs	Fairbanks North Star
Sitka National Cemetery	2061977	57°03′04″N 135°18′56″W	43 feet (13 m)	Sitka	Sitka
Sunrise Cemetery	1415092	60°53′55″N 149°25′37″W	20 feet (6.1 m)	Hope	Kenai Peninsula
Turn Point Cemetery	1415448	56°48′40″N 132°58′42″W	66 feet (20 m)	Petersburg	Wrangell-Petersburg (CA)
Valley Memorial Park (aka Valley Memory Garden)	1416900	61°33′35″N 149°02′28″W	121 feet (37 m)	Palmer	Matanuska-Susitna
