= Eva McGown =

Irish-American hostess

- Born: Eva Montgomery; 23 June 1883; Antrim, County Antrim, Ireland
- Died: 22 February 1972 (aged 88); Fairbanks, Alaska, United States
- Occupations: Official hostess of Fairbanks, Alaska
- Spouse: Arthur Louis McGown

Eva McGown (née Montgomery) (1883–1972), the "hostess of Fairbanks," was best known for her three decades helping newcomers, military wives, construction workers, students, and visitors to find shelter in Fairbanks, Alaska during periods of time — particularly World War II — when the demand for housing far outstripped supply. Named official hostess of Fairbanks and honorary hostess of Alaska, McGown was featured in an article in Reader's Digest and a broadcast of the popular biographical television program This Is Your Life, and was the basis for the character Bridie Ballantyne in the 1958 novel Ice Palace and its 1960 film adaptation. She died in 1972 in a fire in the Nordale Hotel, where she had lived the last 28 years of her life.

== Early life and marriage ==
Eva Montgomery was born on June 23, 1883, in Antrim, Ireland. Little is known about her early life other than that she was director of a choir in Belfast in the early 1900s.

In 1914, when she was 31, she came to the United States to marry Arthur Louis McGown, the part-owner of the Model Cafe in Fairbanks, Alaska. Her travel from Belfast to Fairbanks included a voyage across the Atlantic Ocean on what she later described as "a filthy boat" and a cross-country journey by train to Seattle, Washington, where she boarded a steamer bound for Valdez, Alaska, followed by over a month's winter travel by horse-drawn sleigh and dogsled to Fairbanks, staying at roadhouses along the way. "There were rough and tough men on the trail", she later remembered. "But never a cursing word did they say in my hearing. They gave me hot bricks for my feet and wrapped furs around me." She arrived in Fairbanks on February 26, 1914 and was married to Arthur McGown the same evening.

Arthur became ill five years into their marriage and remained an invalid for the remainder of his life. He died in 1930 of a bone tumor.

== Hostess of Fairbanks ==
Soon after, Eva left the cabin where she had lived with her husband and moved into Room 207 of the Nordale Hotel on Second Avenue in Fairbanks, where she lived for the rest of her life. She supported herself by selling magazines and taking odd jobs, and occupied herself as a hospital visitor and by visiting lonely women newly arrived in Alaska, doing what she could to make them feel welcome.

When World War II arrived, her services as a greeter with an intricate knowledge of available rooms in Fairbanks became vital, and the Fairbanks Chamber of Commerce put her on the payroll for $75 per month to help military wives, construction workers, and others find a place to stay. She later became a city employee for $110 per month. "It was said that Eva carried an inventory in her head of all the spare bedrooms in Fairbanks", wrote Stanton Patty. "She also arranged for beds to be set up in church basements and auditoriums — sometimes even at the city jail." McGown's work was accomplished from a desk in the corner of the Nordale Hotel lobby.

From 1940 to 1951, McGown helped an estimated 50,000 new arrivals, construction workers, students, and visitors find a place to stay.

== National exposure ==
McGown's fame spread far beyond Fairbanks. In 1951, she was the subject of an article in Reader's Digest and on April 22, 1953, she was featured on a broadcast of the biographical television show This Is Your Life with host Ralph Edwards. Her TV appearance was included as part of the first broadcast of Fairbanks television station KFAR-TV in early 1955. In her 1958 novel about Alaska, Ice Palace, Edna Ferber based the character of Bridie Ballantyne, official greeter of the fictional town of Baranof, on McGown;, the part was played by Carolyn Jones in the 1960 film adaptation of the novel.

== Personal life ==
McGown belonged to the Women Pioneers, Eastern Star, Salvation Army, Soroptimists, Fort Wainwright and Eielson Officers' Women's Clubs. She was a member of St. Matthew's Episcopal Church, where she played the organ and led the choir. She continued to play the organ until she developed arthritis in her hands, but afterward still sang with her soprano voice.

== Death ==
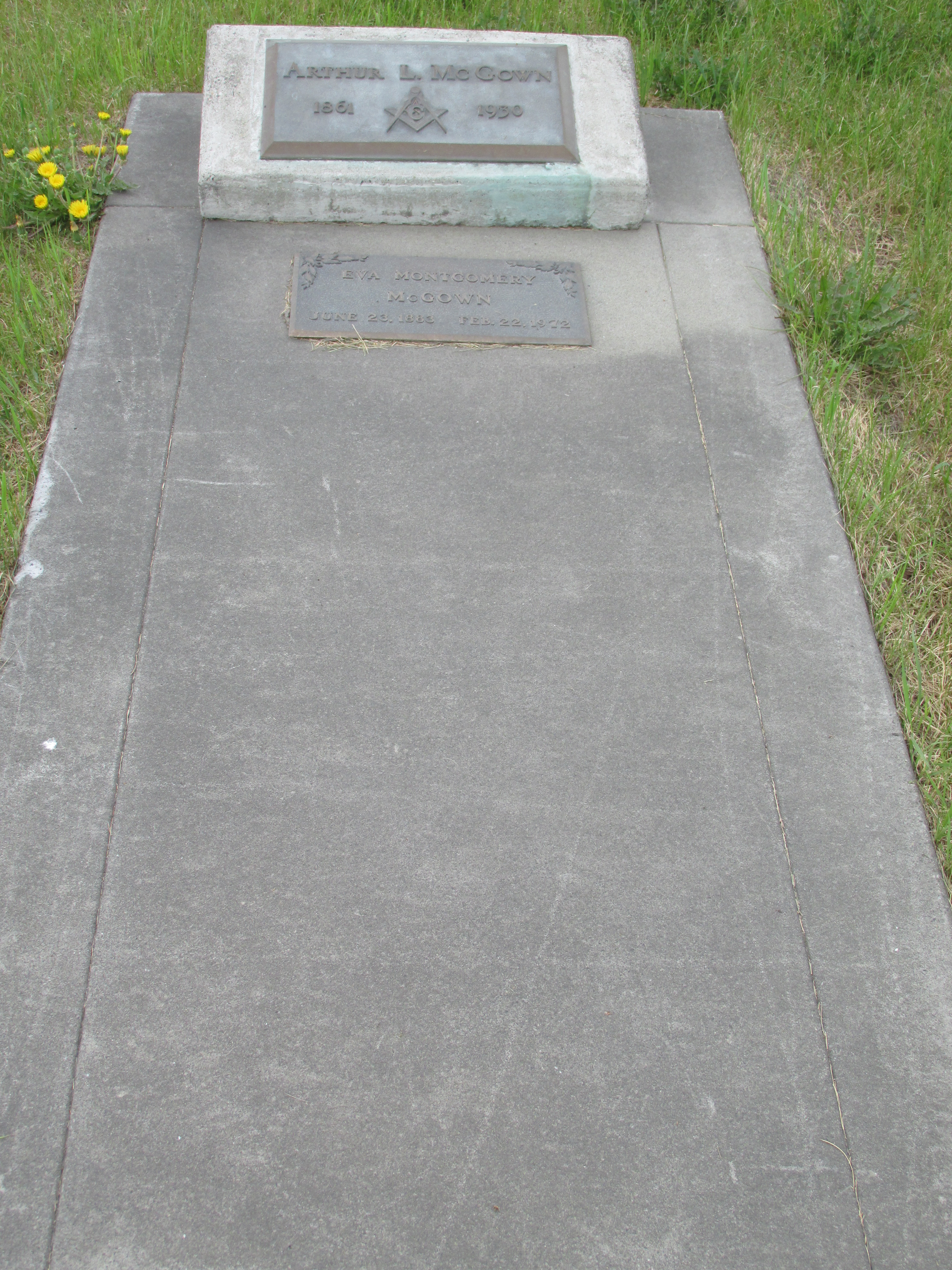
Grave of Arthur and Eva McGown at Clay Street Cemetery

In one of Alaska's deadlier hotel fires, the Nordale Hotel caught fire on February 22, 1972, killing four people and destroying the hotel. Among the four who died in the blaze was McGown, then 88. One of the items recovered from the hotel safe after the fire was a small box belonging to her, in which was contained a piece of dried sod from Ireland. An Alaska Supreme Court decision later ruled that the City of Fairbanks had a duty to protect hotel occupants through fire inspections.

== Recognitions and honors ==
McGown was the first woman to win the Fairbanks Chamber of Commerce distinguished-service award.

In 1953, territorial governor B. Frank Heintzleman issued a proclamation naming McGown Alaska's honorary hostess.

In 1971 the University of Alaska Fairbanks dedicated a music rehearsal hall in McGown's honor. The Eva McGown Music Room is located in the Fine Arts Complex. It is designed specifically for choral practice and is equipped with risers for group rehearsal.

A stained glass window designed by Helen L. Atkinson and made by Debbie Mathews from over 500 pieces of glass was created for St. Matthew's Episcopal Church in 1999. The window commemorates Eva McGown and the St. Matthew's choir of the early 1900s and depicts McGown playing the organ.
