= Sitka National Cemetery =

Historic veterans cemetery in Alaska

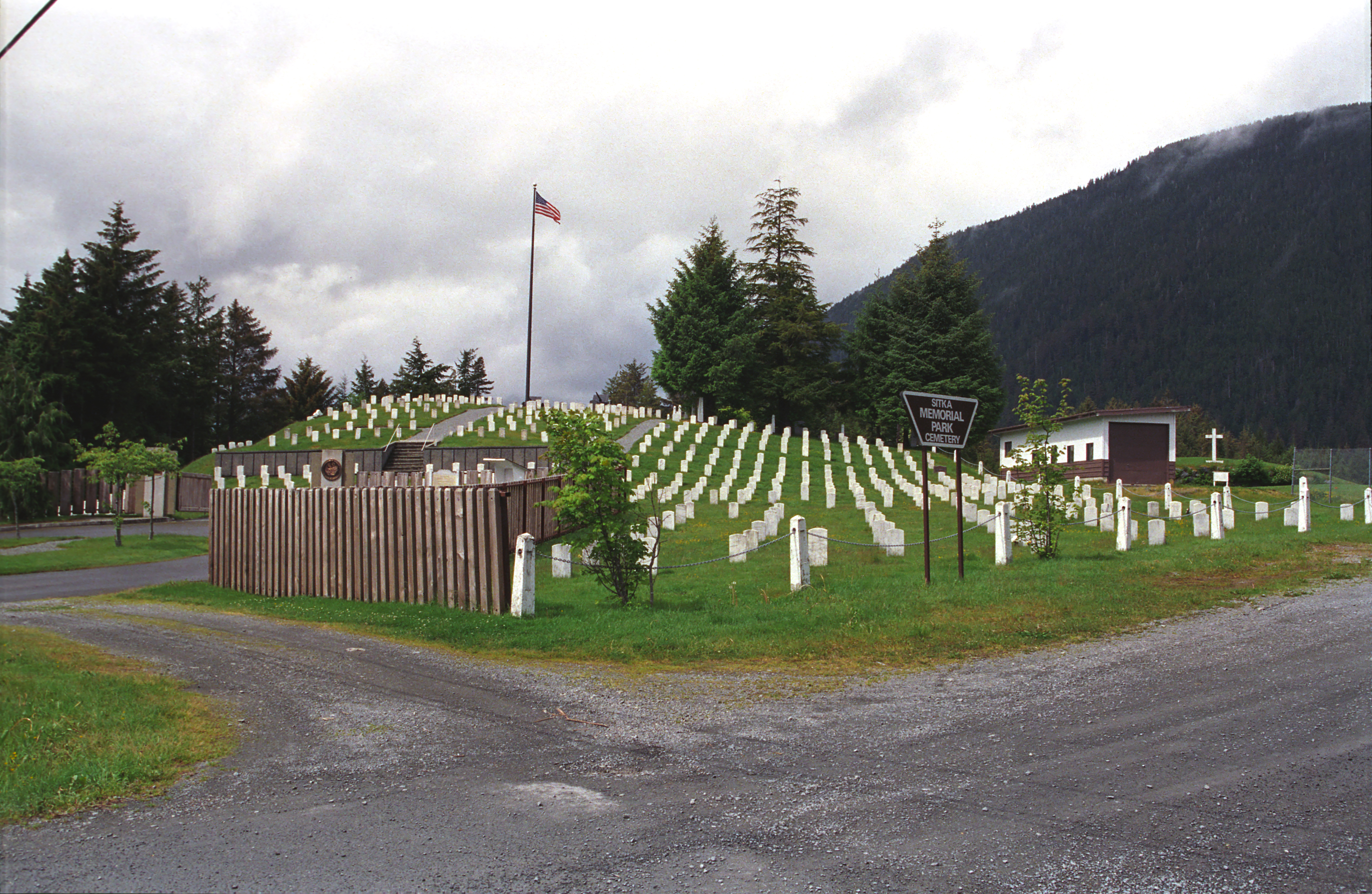
- Interactive map of Sitka National Cemetery

Details
- Established: 1868–1870
- Location: Sitka, Alaska
- Country: United States of America
- Coordinates: 57°03′18″N 135°19′26″W, Elevation: 43 feet (13 m)
- Type: United States National Cemetery
- Owned by: United States Army
- Size: 4.3 acres (0.017 km^{2})
- No. of graves: ~1,500 (2021)
- Website: Official
- Find a Grave: Sitka National Cemetery
- Sitka National Cemetery
- U.S. National Register of Historic Places
- U.S. Historic district
- Alaska Heritage Resources Survey
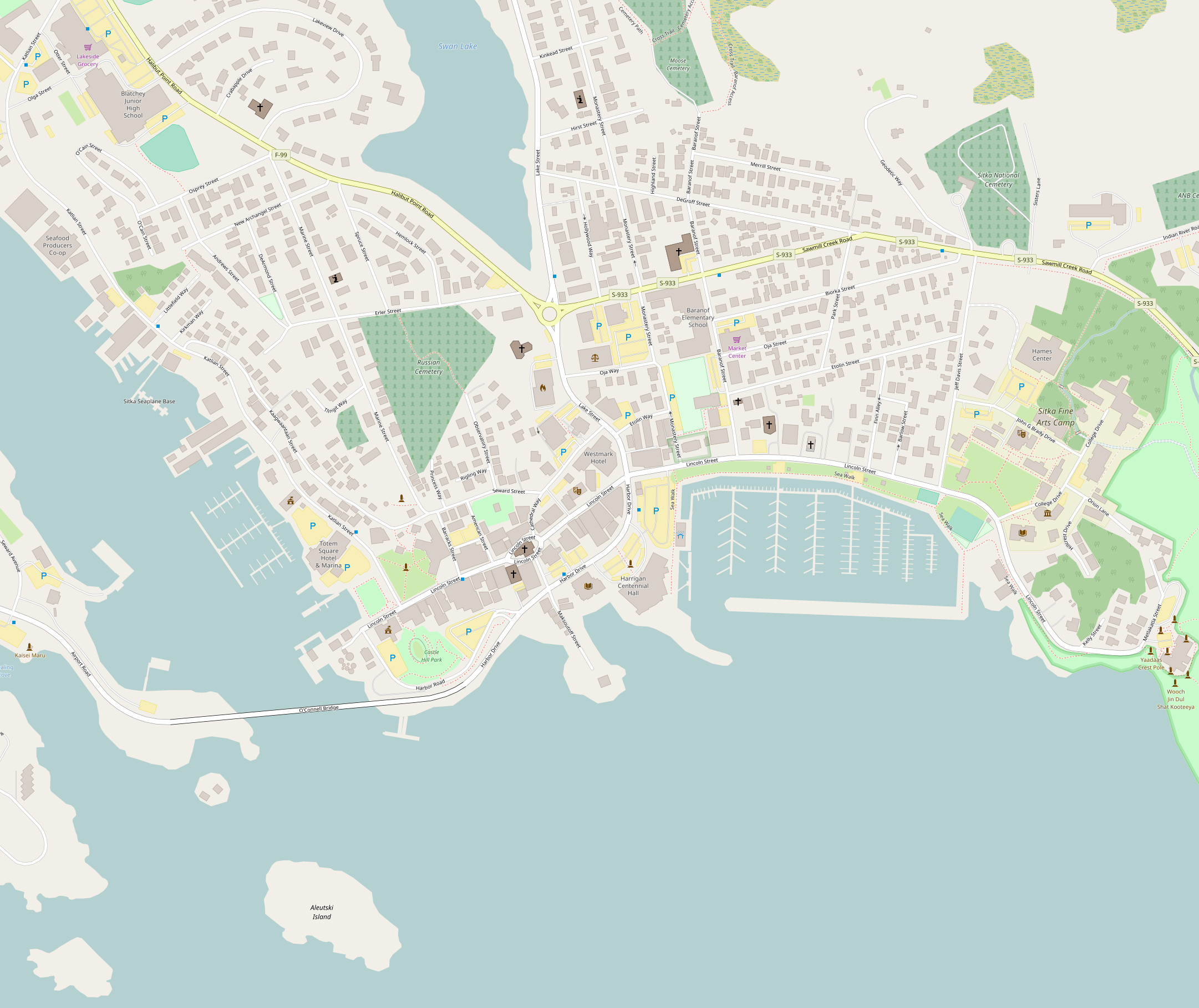
- Location within Downtown Sitka Location within Alaska
- Location: 803 Sawmill Creek Road, Sitka, Alaska
- Coordinates: 57°03′18″N 135°19′26″W
- NRHP reference No.: 12000057
- AHRS No.: SIT-029
- Added to NRHP: March 7, 2012

Sitka National Cemetery is a United States National Cemetery located in the city of Sitka, Alaska. It encompasses 4.3 acres (1.7 ha), and as of the end of 2005 had 1,049 interments. It is administered as part of the Fort Richardson National Cemetery by the United States Department of Veterans Affairs.

== History ==
Laid out by General Jefferson C. Davis, at some point between 1868 and 1870 during his time as the first commander of the Department of Alaska, as a place to inter military personnel who died while serving at the local Marine base or were under care at the Naval hospital. In 1912, the military withdrew from the area and the cemetery was neglected until 1921 when the Sitka American Legion petitioned the Secretary of the Navy for an allocation of funds to maintain the site.

In 1924, President Calvin Coolidge gave an executive order declaring the site a National Cemetery, and the maintenance responsibility was turned over to the United States Department of War. A 1925 revision of the executive order reduced the area of the site, but donations of land in 1957, 1959, and in the mid-1980s made it larger than it was originally.

The cemetery was enlisted as a historic district in the National Register of Historic Places in 2012.

== Notable monuments ==
- There are two cannons that serves as a memorial to all those who are interred at the cemetery.

== Notable interments ==
- John Green Brady, governor of the Territory of Alaska from 1897 to 1906.
- Captain Charles William Paddock, Olympic gold and silver medalist from the 1920, 1924, and 1928 Olympics.
- Staff Sergeant Archie Van Winkle, Medal of Honor recipient for action in the Korean War. (Cenotaph – his remains were cremated and scattered at sea.)
- Michael Silka, U.S. Army veteran and spree killer.

== See also ==
- List of cemeteries in Alaska
- National Register of Historic Places listings in Sitka City and Borough, Alaska
