= Antrim, County Antrim =

Town in County Antrim, Northern Ireland

Antrim: Irish: Aontroim; Scots: Antrìm, Anthrim or Entrim
- Town
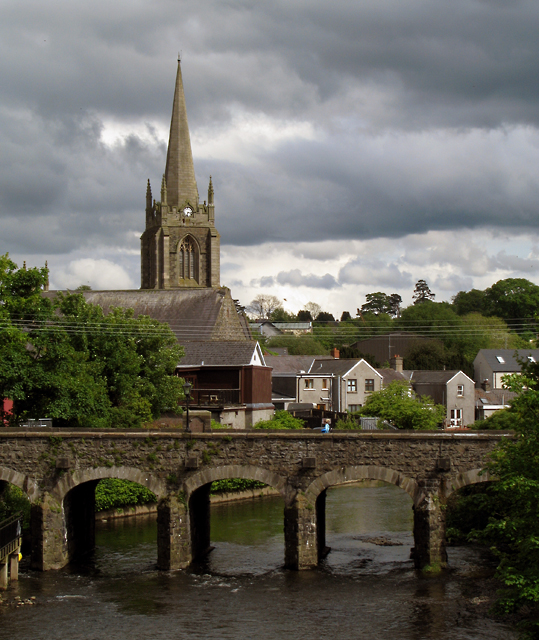
- All Saints Parish Church and bridge over the Six Mile Water

- Coat of Arms

- Location within Northern Ireland
- Population: 25,606 (2021 census)
- Irish grid reference: J1588
  - Belfast: 19 miles (31 km)
- District: Antrim and Newtownabbey
- County: County Antrim
- Country: Northern Ireland
- Sovereign state: United Kingdom
- Post town: ANTRIM
- Postcode district: BT41
- Dialling code: 028
- Police: Northern Ireland
- Fire: Northern Ireland
- Ambulance: Northern Ireland
- UK Parliament: South Antrim
- NI Assembly: South Antrim
- Website: antrimandnewtownabbey.gov.uk

Antrim (Irish: Aontroim [ˈeːnˠt̪ˠɾˠɪmʲ], meaning 'lone ridge') is a historic market town, civil parish, and the county town of County Antrim in Northern Ireland. It lies on the banks of the Six Mile Water on the north-east shore of Lough Neagh, approximately 14 miles (23 km) north-west of Belfast. It had a population of 25,606 people in the 2021 census.

The town was the administrative centre of Antrim Borough Council until its 2015 merger with Newtownabbey Borough Council to form Antrim and Newtownabbey Borough Council.

== History ==
=== Early history ===
According to tradition, a monastery was founded at Antrim in AD 495, thirty years after the death of Saint Patrick, to take forward his ministry, with a small settlement growing up around it. The round tower (see below), also known as "the Steeple", is all that remains. The original name of Antrim was Aontreibh, Irish for 'lone house', referring to the monks' house. This later became or was reinterpreted as Aontroim ('lone ridge').

In the early Middle Ages, the area was part of the Gaelic territory of Dál Araide, which covered much of what is now County Antrim. At the eastern edge of town is a ringfort called Rathmore (Ráth Mór, 'great fort'), which was the royal residence of the kings of Dál Araide.

In the late 12th century, the area was conquered by Anglo-Normans led by John de Courcy, becoming part of the Earldom of Ulster. They built a motte-and-bailey castle at Antrim. Its mound (motte) still stands in Antrim Castle Gardens.

The Anglo-Norman earldom collapsed in the early 14th century and Antrim became part of the Gaelic territory of Clannaboy. During the late Middle Ages, the O'Neill chiefs of Clannaboy were based at Edenduffcarrick castle (later called Shane's Castle), two miles west of Antrim.

=== Early Modern era ===
Following the Nine Years' War (1593–1603), Antrim came under English control. The area was then colonized by English and Scottish settlers as part of the Plantation of Ulster. Hugh Clotworthy, the father of the Anglo-Irish politician John Clotworthy, 1st Viscount Massereene, supervised the building of Antrim Castle, a fortified mansion beside the old Norman motte. Hugh was knighted in 1617 and appointed High Sheriff of County Antrim. In 1642, during the Irish Confederate Wars, Clotworthy's fleet fought a naval engagement on Lough Neagh.

The Society of United Irishmen launched a rebellion in 1798, which began in Leinster and quickly spread to Ulster. The United Irishmen had been founded in 1791 by liberal Protestants in Belfast. Its goal was to unite Catholics and Protestants, to end British monarchical rule over Ireland, and to found a sovereign, independent Irish republic. Although its membership was mainly Catholic, many of its leaders and members in northeast Ulster were Protestant Presbyterians. On 7 June 1798 about 4,000 United Irishmen led by Henry Joy McCracken attacked the town. The rebels were about to take the town when British reinforcements arrived. Thanks to a rebel band led by James Hope, most of the United Irishmen withdrew safely. This is known as the Battle of Antrim.

Before the Act of Union, the parliamentary borough of Antrim returned two members to the Irish House of Commons by virtue of letters patent granted in 1666 by Charles II. It was disenfranchised in 1801.

Steeple House, a substantial 18th-century mansion that was home to the Clark family and then became the headquarters of Antrim Borough Council, was destroyed in a fire in 2019.

=== The Troubles ===
There were several incidents in and around Antrim during the Troubles. In 1976, six civilians (five Protestants and one Catholic) were shot and killed during a UVF gun attack on the Ramble Inn pub near Antrim.

== Climate ==
Like the rest of Northern Ireland, Antrim experiences a maritime climate with cool summers and mild winters. The nearest official Met Office weather station for which online records are available is at Belfast International Airport, under 4 miles to the south of the town centre.

In a typical year the warmest day reaches a temperature of 25.4 °C (77.7 °F) and 2.1 days attain a temperature of 25.1 °C (77.2 °F) or above.

The coldest night of the year averages −6.6 °C (20.1 °F) and 39 nights should register an air frost. The absolute minimum temperature of −14.2 °C (6.4 °F) was reported during the record cold spell of December 2010. In that month 10 nights fell to −10.0 °C (14.0 °F) or below, and the 21st recorded a daytime maximum of just −7.7 °C (18.1 °F)

Climate data for Belfast International Airport WMO ID: 03917; coordinates 54°39′50″N 6°13′30″W; elevation: 63 m (207 ft); 1991–2020 normals, extremes 1930–present
Month	Jan	Feb	Mar	Apr	May	Jun	Jul	Aug	Sep	Oct	Nov	Dec	Year
Record high °C (°F)	14.5 (58.1)	15.6 (60.1)	20.2 (68.4)	23.9 (75.0)	26.1 (79.0)	29.5 (85.1)	30.8 (87.4)	28.0 (82.4)	27.1 (80.8)	21.8 (71.2)	17.1 (62.8)	15.0 (59.0)	30.8 (87.4)
Mean daily maximum °C (°F)	7.3 (45.1)	7.9 (46.2)	9.7 (49.5)	12.3 (54.1)	15.2 (59.4)	17.6 (63.7)	19.1 (66.4)	18.7 (65.7)	16.6 (61.9)	13.1 (55.6)	9.8 (49.6)	7.6 (45.7)	12.9 (55.2)
Daily mean °C (°F)	4.7 (40.5)	4.9 (40.8)	6.3 (43.3)	8.5 (47.3)	11.2 (52.2)	13.8 (56.8)	15.4 (59.7)	15.2 (59.4)	13.2 (55.8)	10.2 (50.4)	7.1 (44.8)	5.0 (41.0)	9.6 (49.3)
Mean daily minimum °C (°F)	2.1 (35.8)	2.0 (35.6)	3.0 (37.4)	4.7 (40.5)	7.1 (44.8)	9.9 (49.8)	11.8 (53.2)	11.7 (53.1)	9.9 (49.8)	7.2 (45.0)	4.4 (39.9)	2.4 (36.3)	6.4 (43.5)
Record low °C (°F)	−12.8 (9.0)	−11.7 (10.9)	−12.2 (10.0)	−5.1 (22.8)	−3.3 (26.1)	−1.2 (29.8)	2.2 (36.0)	1.7 (35.1)	−2.2 (28.0)	−3.9 (25.0)	−8.6 (16.5)	−14.9 (5.2)	−14.9 (5.2)
Average precipitation mm (inches)	77.0 (3.03)	63.3 (2.49)	60.6 (2.39)	55.6 (2.19)	55.9 (2.20)	68.0 (2.68)	78.8 (3.10)	84.5 (3.33)	69.2 (2.72)	88.0 (3.46)	87.7 (3.45)	83.5 (3.29)	872.0 (34.33)
Average precipitation days (≥ 1.0 mm)	14.7	13.2	13.0	12.0	11.6	11.9	14.1	14.2	12.1	14.0	15.5	15.2	161.3
Average snowy days	5	5	4	1	0	0	0	0	0	0	1	3	19
Average relative humidity (%)	89	87	88	89	90	90	90	92	92	91	90	89	91
Mean monthly sunshine hours	48.7	72.1	108.4	157.8	197.9	167.6	152.0	146.4	121.5	91.2	61.3	47.1	1,372
Source 1: Met Office NOAA (relative humidity and snow days 1961–-1990)
Source 2: Servizio Meteorologico (extremes)

== Demography ==
=== 2011 census ===
On census day (27 March 2011) there were 23,375 people living in Antrim, accounting for 1.29% of the NI total, representing an increase of 16.9% on the census 2001 population of 20,001. Of these:

- 21.47% were aged under 16 years and 13.33% were aged 65 and over.
- 48.72% of the usually resident population were male and 51.28% were female.
- 54.80% belong to or were brought up in a Protestant or other Christian related background and 34.12% were brought up in a Catholic background.
- 61.47% indicated that they had a British national identity, 30.76% had a Northern Irish national identity and 11.56% had an Irish national identity (respondents could indicate more than one national identity).
- 35 years was the average (median) age of the population.
- 8.43% had some knowledge of Ulster Scots and 5.20% had some knowledge of the Irish language.

=== 2021 census ===
On census day (21 March 2021) there were 25,606 people living in Antrim. Of these:

- 21.23% were aged under 16, 64.35% were aged between 16 and 65, and 14.41% were aged 66 and over.
- 51.2% of the usually resident population were female, and 48.8% were male.
- 48.28% belong to or were brought up in a Protestant or other Christian related background, 34.55% were brought up in a Catholic background, 2.3% belong to or were brought up in an 'other religion', and 14.87% didn't adhere to or weren't brought up in any religion.
- 54.09% indicated that they had a British national identity, 36.12% had a Northern Irish national identity and 14.66% had an Irish national identity (respondents could indicate more than one national identity).
- 9.25% had some knowledge of Ulster Scots and 5.23% had some knowledge of the Irish language.

== Landmarks ==
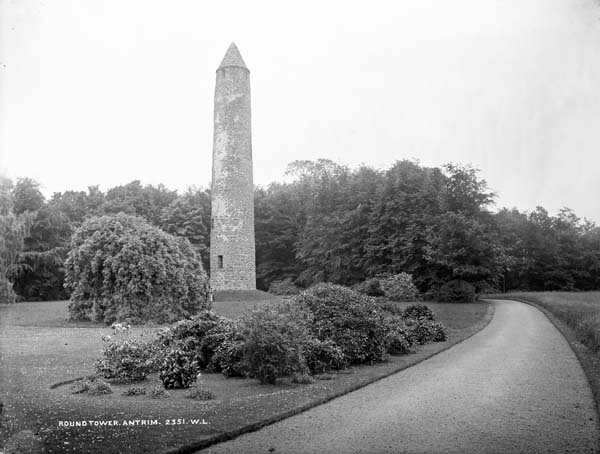
Antrim round tower

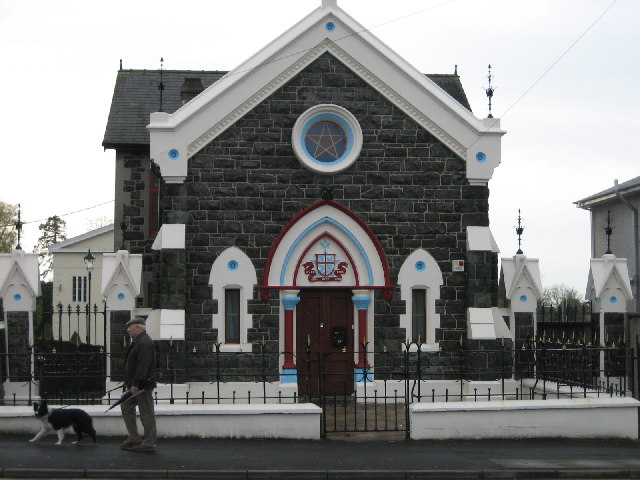
Antrim Masonic Hall

- Shane's Castle and Antrim Castle
- In the north of the town is one of the most perfect of the round towers of Ireland, 93 feet high and 50 feet in circumference at the base. It stands in the grounds of Steeple, where there is also the "Witches' Stone", a prehistoric monument.
- A Castle, near the Six Mile Water, was destroyed in a fire in 1922. All that remains is an octagonal tower.
- The river allowed the linen industry to be established. The linen industry has been replaced by a Technology Park, the only one in Northern Ireland.
- Antrim Market House is a two–story building, nine bays long and three deep, built in 1726. Formerly a Court House, it was refurbished and is used as a tourist information centre. It has a small theatre and café.
- The Castle Grounds, beside the Antrim Castle.
- The Springfarm Rath

== Transport ==
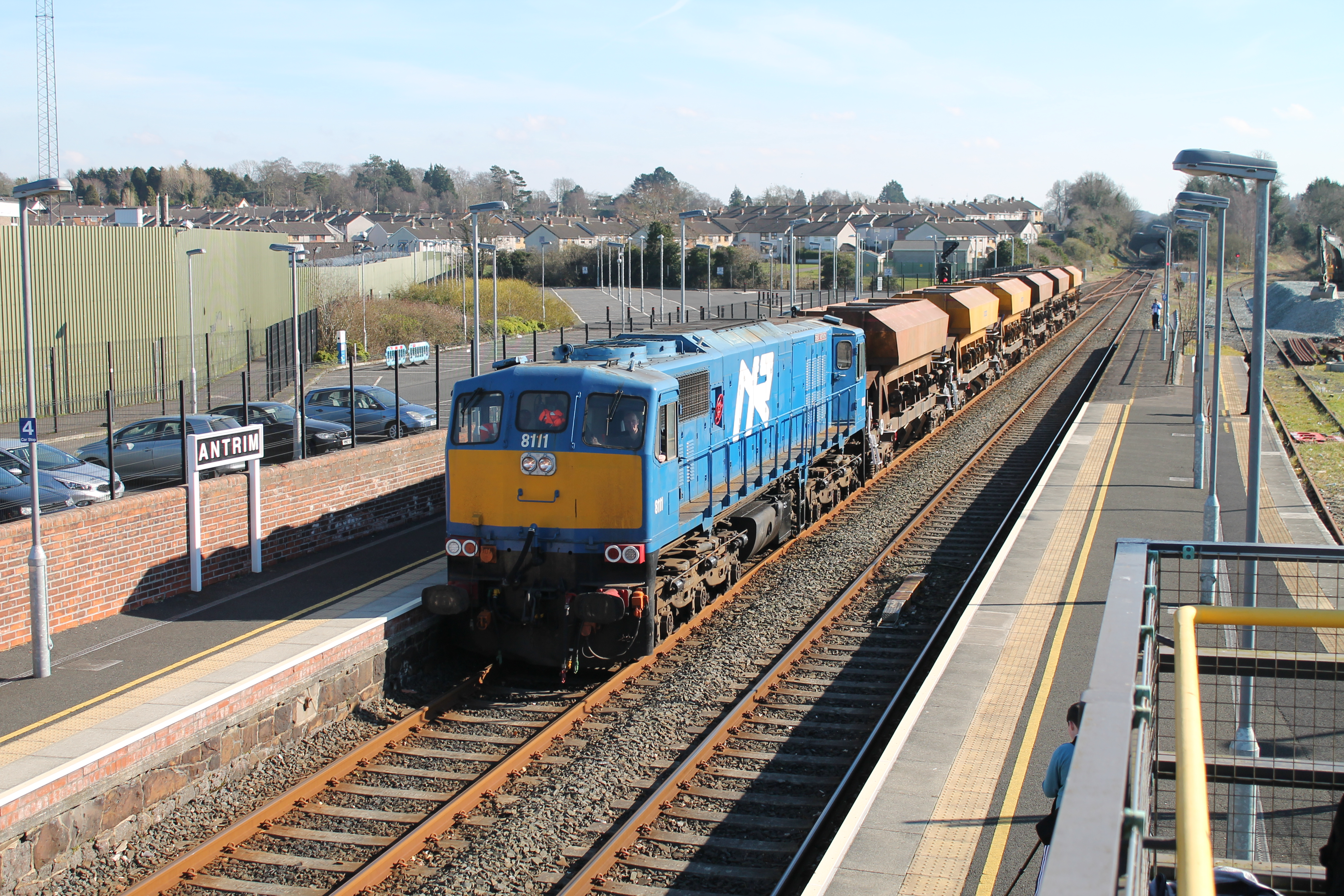
Antrim railway station on Northern Ireland Railways.

Antrim railway station opened on 11 April 1848 and closed for goods traffic in 1965. It is served by passenger trains on the Belfast-Derry railway line, run by Northern Ireland Railways.

Belfast International Airport (formerly named Aldergrove Airport) is five miles to the south of the town. It is Northern Ireland's largest airport, serving destinations in Britain, Europe and North America. It lacks an airport rail link connection.

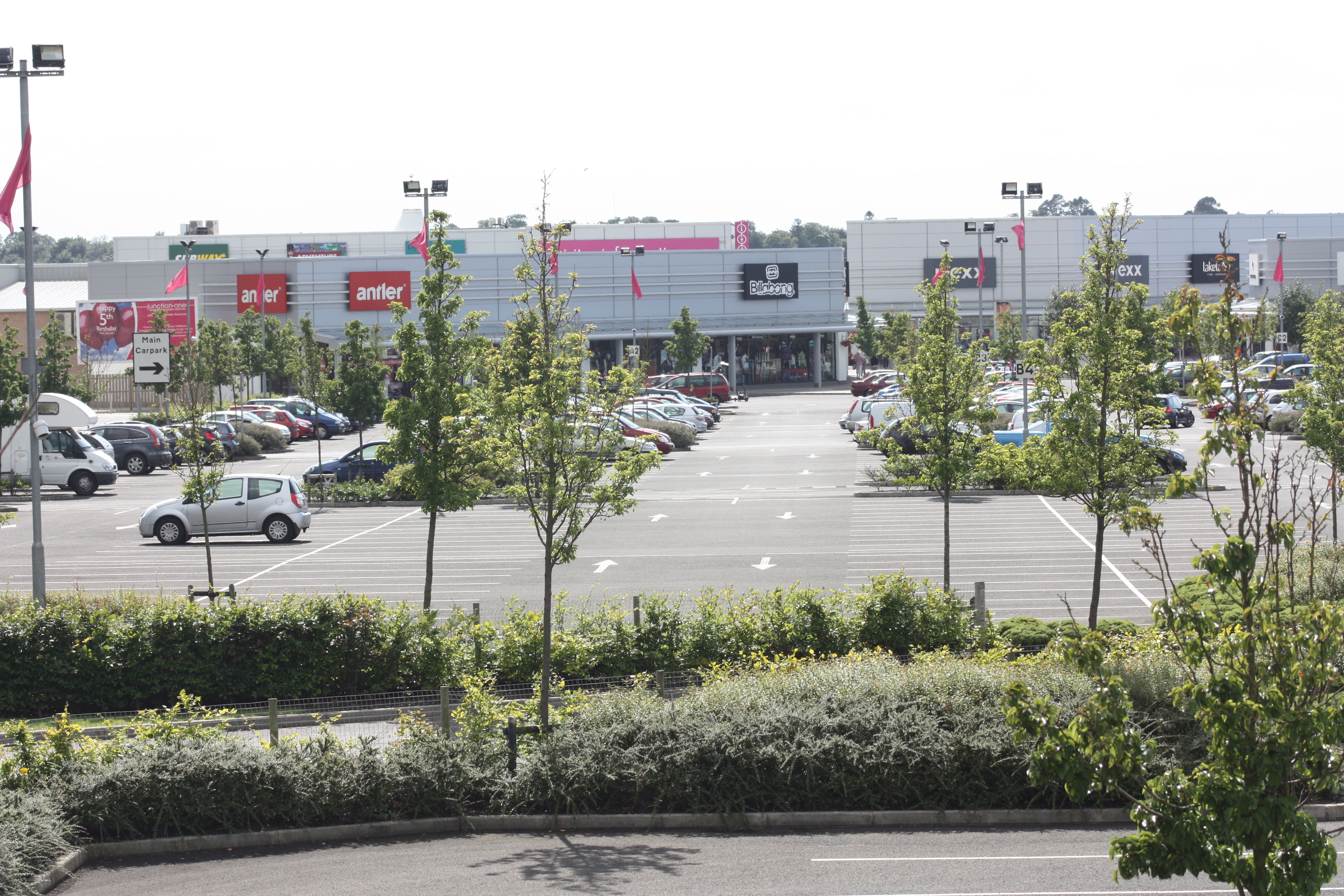
Junction One Retail Park

== Retail ==
The Junction, formerly Junction One (named after junction 1 of the nearby M22 Motorway), is a retail park in the area with restaurants and a hotel. Supermarkets serving the town include an Asda store, Lidl outlet, Tesco Extra, and Iceland store. Castle Mall, formerly known as the Castle Centre, is on High Street.

== Education ==
Junior schools serving the area include Antrim Primary School, Ballycraigy Primary School, Greystone Primary School, St Comgall's Primary School, and St Joseph's Primary School.

The secondary schools are Antrim Grammar School and Parkhall College.

The Greenmount campus of the College of Agriculture, Food and Rural Enterprise (CAFRE) is near Antrim.

== Sport ==
The local Gaelic Athletic Association club is Naomh Comhghall CLG (St. Comgalls Antrim). The association football club, Chimney Corner F.C., plays its home games in Allen Park on Castle Road. Other Antrim sports clubs include Antrim Hockey Club and Muckamore Cricket Club.

== Notable people ==
- Mark Allen (born 1986) – snooker player
- Caitlin Blackwood (born 2000) – actress
- Declan Kearney (born 1964) – Sinn Féin politician, MLA
- Thomas McCord (1750–1824) – businessman and politician in Lower Canada
- Eva McGown (1883–1972) – Official Hostess of Fairbanks and Honorary Hostess of Alaska
- Joseph Stephenson-Jellie (1874–1960) – cricketer
- Josh Rock (born 2001) – darts player
- Hugh Montgomery (c. 1735 – unknown), British Army soldier involved in the Boston Massacre. He was born and raised as a labourer in Antrim.

== See also ==
- List of localities in Northern Ireland by population
- Market houses in Northern Ireland
- List of civil parishes of County Antrim
