= Robert O. Bowen =

American novelist (1920–2003)

Robert Owen Bowen (May 7, 1920, in Bridgeport, Connecticut – June 9, 2003, in Anchorage, Alaska) was an American novelist and essayist.

== Biography ==
Bowen served in the United States Navy in during World War II and was a prisoner of war in the Philippines. He was discharged as a Weapons Technician (Third Class Petty Officer). After World War II, he earned bachelor's and master's degrees, a Phi Beta Kappa key and a Fulbright scholarship to Wales, where he studied Welsh prosody. Mr. Bowen was an author, professor, editor, writer in residence at Cornell, the University of Washington, and the Iowa Writer's Workshop. In 1963 Mr. Bowen moved to Anchorage and was a professor. He was commander of the Alaska chapter of the American Ex-POWs. In 2002, he received the Alaskan of the Year Governor's Award for a three-year effort in organizing the Veterans Statue project on the Delaney Park Strip.

== Works ==
=== Novels ===
- The Weight of the Cross (1951, novel)
- Bamboo (1953, novel)
- Sidestreets (1953, novel)
- Strangers (1956, novel)
- Trapper's Peak (1958, novel)

=== Essays ===
- Practical Prose Studies (1956, collection of essays)
- The New Professor (1956, collection of essays)
- The Truth about Communism (1962, collection of essays)
- The College Style Manual (1963, collection of essays)
- Alaskan Dictionary (1966, collection of travel articles)

=== Other works ===
- The Beacon Annual (1958, collection of short fiction)
- Mountain Child (1959, play)

== Later life ==
Bowen is buried at Fort Richardson National Cemetery in Fort Richardson, Anchorage Borough, Alaska.
