= Kesugi Ridge Trail =

Hiking path in Denali State Park, Alaska

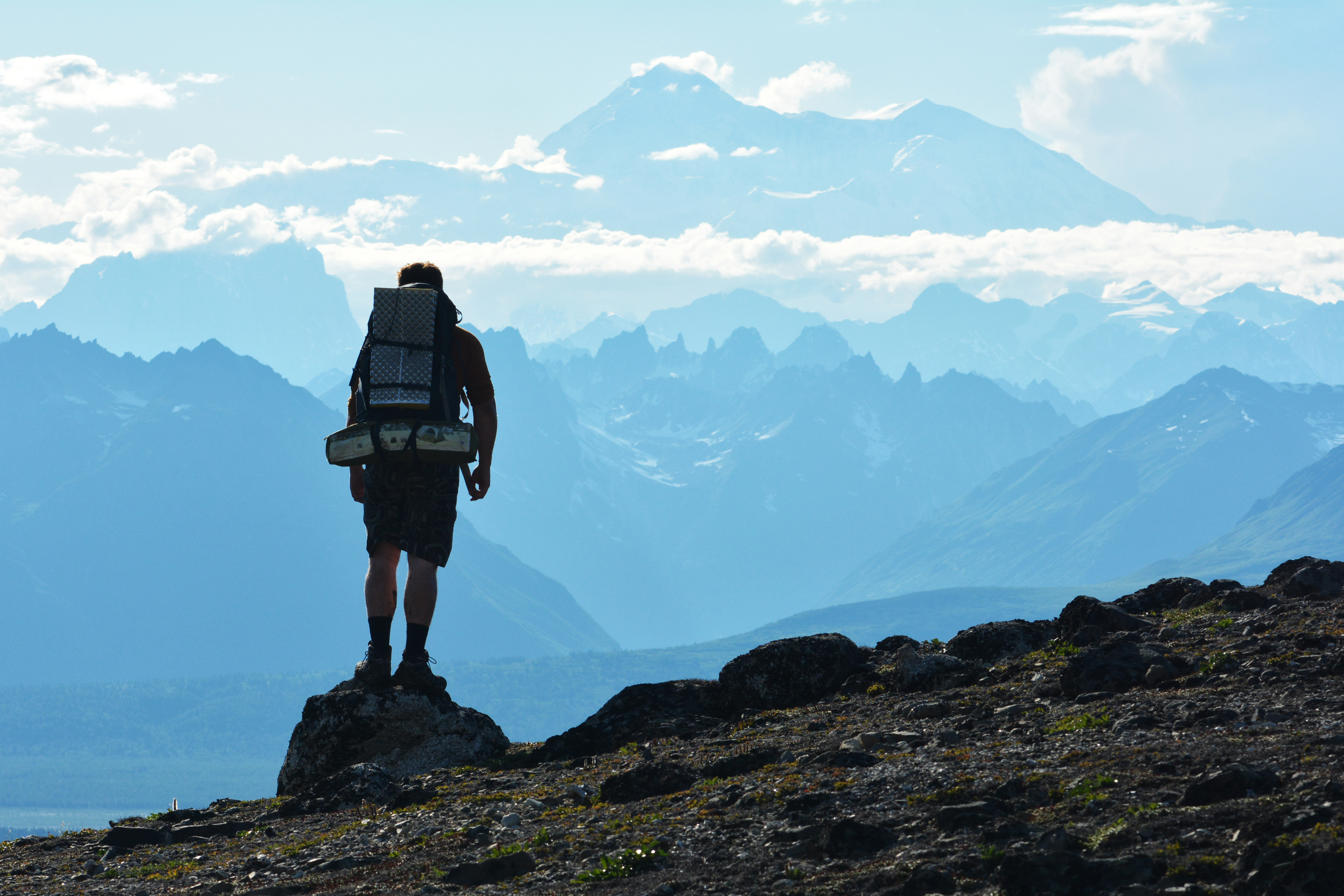
- Denali seen from Kesugi Ridge Trail
- Length: 22 miles (35 km)
- Location: Denali State Park
- Trailheads: North: 62.8765°N 149.6842°W South: 62.7305°N 150.0581°W
- Use: Hiking, backpacking
- Elevation gain/loss: 2,800 feet (850 m) feet gain, north to south
- Highest point: 3,500 feet (1,100 m)
- Lowest point: 700 feet (210 m)
- Difficulty: Difficult
- Waymark: Cairns at rocky parts
- Sights: Denali
- Hazards: Bear, severe weather
- Surface: Unpaved
- Maintained by: Alaska State Parks

Kesugi Ridge Trail is a through hike in Denali State Park, Alaska, United States. Under favorable conditions visitors can see Denali, the tallest mountain in North America. The trail is 22 miles (35 km) long, but does not connect directly to a roadway. The Upper Troublesome Creek trail, Cascade trail, Ermine Hill trail and Little Coal Creek trail provide access to it from Parks Highway between mile 137.6 and mile 163.9. It starts below the tree line and works it way up to the alpine tundra along the ridge, crossing hills and valleys with cairns marking the way in rocky areas. This hike can be considered difficult because of the elevation gain, exposure to sudden changes in weather and of bear activity. At times the presence of bear forces the closure of the trail. Other times it is closed because of flooding.

== Gallery ==
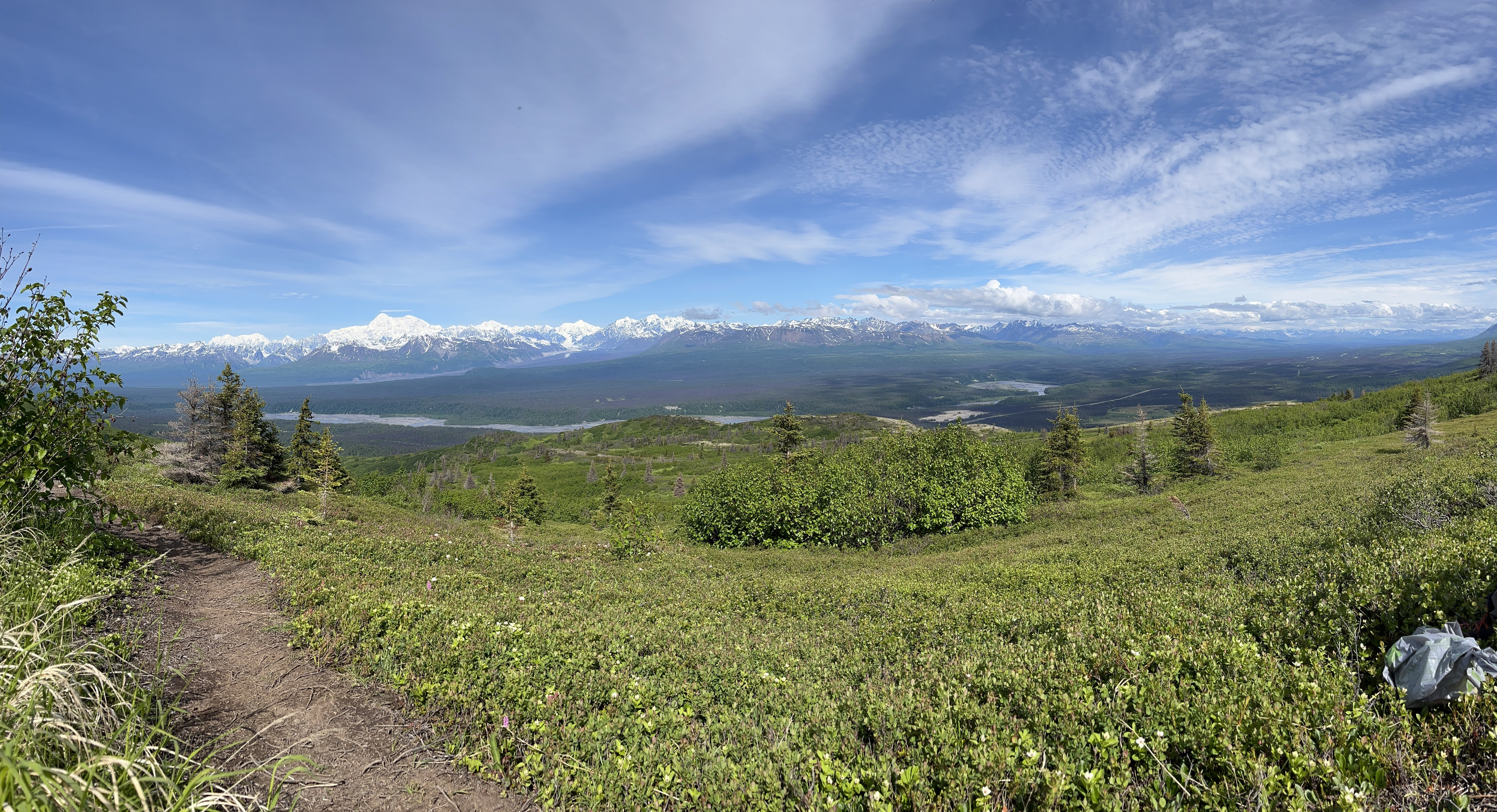
Denali visible from the Kesugi Ridge Trail, July 2023

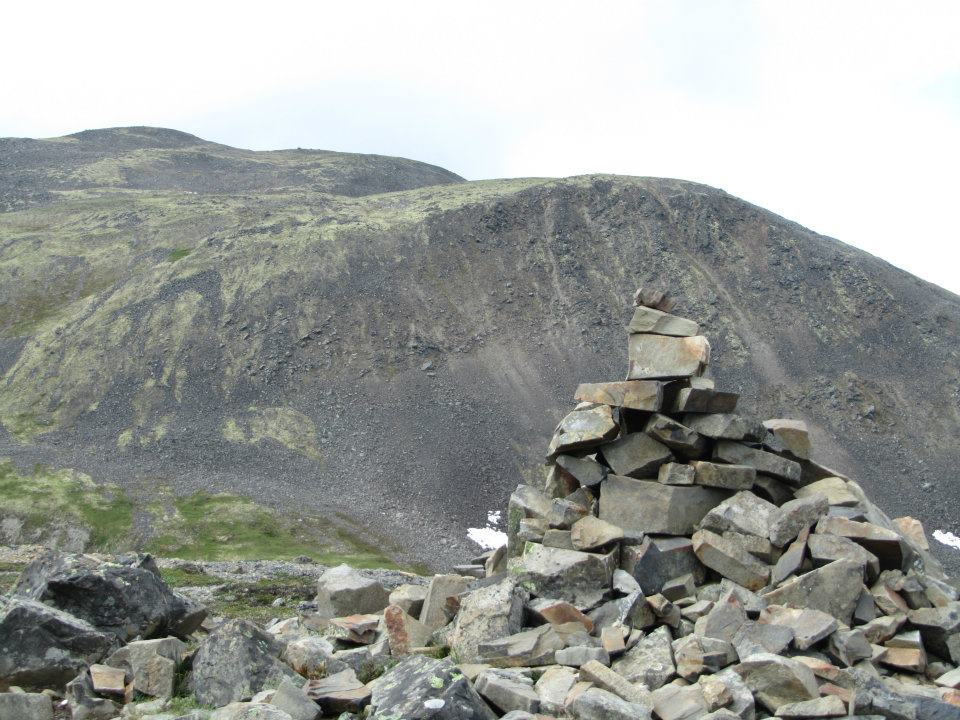
Cairn along Kesugi Ridge

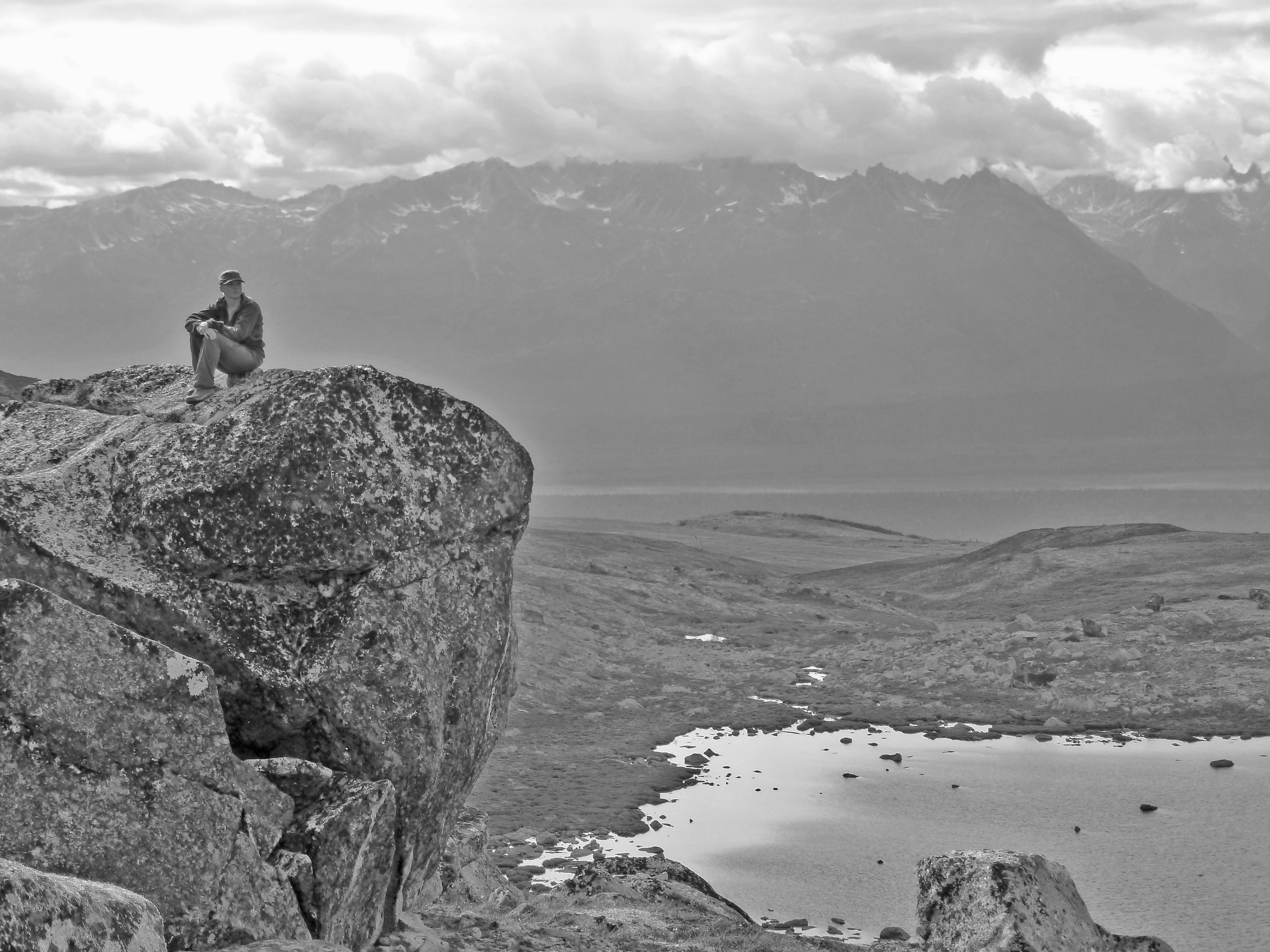
Rock Formations along Kesugi Ridge
