= Charles Foster Jones =

American civilian who was executed by Japanese soldiers

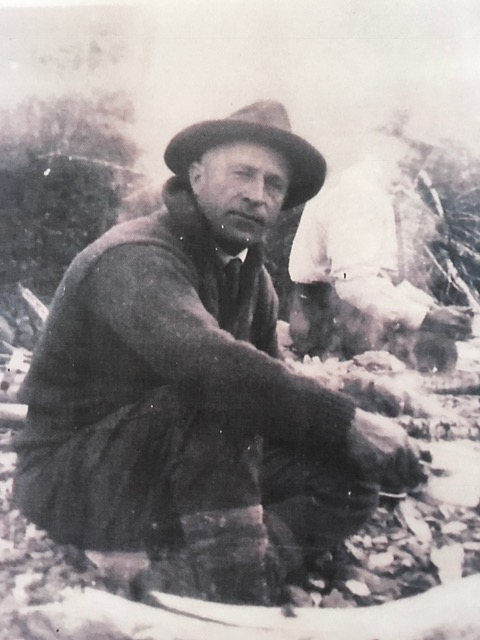
- Born: 1 May 1879; St. Paris, Ohio, United States
- Died: 8 June 1942 (aged 63); Attu Island, Alaska, United States
- Cause of death: Bullet wound to the head
- Body discovered: September 1945
- Resting place: Fort Richardson National Cemetery
- Other names: Foster Jones; Chawky
- Occupations: Weather observer and radio operator for the BIA
- Spouse: Etta Eugenie Jones (1923–1942)

Charles Foster Jones (1 May 1879 – 8 June 1942) was an American ham radio operator and weather observer who with his wife Etta were the only white couple on the Aleutian Island of Attu. During the Japanese occupation of Attu he was executed by Japanese soldiers. He was the only known civilian to be executed by the Japanese on American soil.

== Early life ==
Charles Foster Jones was born on 1 May 1879 in St. Paris, Ohio. He was the second child of Dr. Caleb Jones (2 June 1851 – 26 July 1924) and Sarah E. Jones (née Morris; 10 June 1851 – 29 September 1879). his family nicknamed him Chawky. When Jones was less than a year old his mother Sarah died from typhoid fever. A year later in 1880 Caleb married Julia Anna Jones (née Goodin; October 1862 – 1 December 1954). They had six children together.

In around 1897 Jones attended the University of Puget Sound. In 1898 during the Klondike Gold Rush he dropped out, and took mining jobs for over 20 years in Alaska. In the early 1920s in Tanana, Jones met his future wife Etta Eugenie "Tetts" Schureman (30 September 1879 – 12 December 1965) who was working at a post office. Schureman was a trained school teacher and nurse. They married in 1923.

== Later life ==
The couple travelled across Alaska for several years. During this time, Charles made his own radio and got a license to operate it. At some point the couple became employees for the Bureau of Indian Affairs and in September 1941 they moved to Attu Island which at the time had a population of around 45 Aleuts, making the couple the only white inhabitants of the island. The two lived in a small village at Chichagof Harbor. They were tasked with sending daily weather reports, keeping the school in repair, and directing the music band and entertainment.

=== Death ===
On 4 June 1942 while out on a boat trip Etta noticed the military build up at Dutch Harbor, during the Battle of Dutch Harbor. On 7 June, while the Attuans were returning home from church, 1,170 Japanese soldiers attacked them and rounded them up. Charles, who had just finished his daily weather report, told the men stationed at Dutch Harbor that "The Japs are here," which was the last time anyone heard from Attu's inhabitants until the end of the war. Charles destroyed the radio shortly before being captured by the Japanese.

The next day Japanese soldiers are believed to have tortured Jones, before demanding him to fix the broken radio. When he refused they shot him in the head and beheaded him. The soldiers then informed Etta that Charles had died and told her he had slit his wrists. They showed her his body which they beheaded in front of her. The soldiers then forced two Aleut men, Mike Lokanin and Alfred Prokopioff, to bury his body by the church and mark it with a bottle.

== Aftermath ==
On 21 June Etta arrived at a detention camp in Yokohama, while the 44 other Attuans were taken to another camp, where 16 died from malnutrition or illness. Etta befriended a group of 18 Australian nurses who had been captured in what is now Papua New Guinea. When they arrived Etta was reportedly bewildered and was found weeping behind a potted plant. Due to the women being much younger than Etta, she became a "surrogate mother" for the group. Etta and the 18 nurses were later moved to a detention camp in Totsuka. Etta was reportedly treated with kindness and was respected while in detention, the Japanese calling her "Oba San" which meant grandma, and was seen as a title of respect.

In May 1943 the US Army liberated Attu, but found no trace of Foster or any of the island's inhabitants.

Etta survived the war, and was freed on 17 August 1945, and subsequently sent home on 1 September 1945. She was given a check of $7,371.00 in compensation by the BIA. She moved to Florida and died on 12 December 1965.

After the war ended the two men who buried Foster, Mike Lokanin and Alfred Prokopioff, later led searchers to where they buried Jones's body. After the discovery of his body in September 1945, he was reburied at the Fort Richardson National Cemetery.

A few months later Mike and his wife Parascovia Lokanin who was from Atka and anthropologist Verne F. Ray recorded what's now known as the Lokanin Discs, a group of four glass 78 rpm discs were recorded in early December 1945 at the University of Washington in Seattle. The discs were found by Verne's wife Dorothy Jean Ray also a anthropologist, after someone had donated papers and letters to the Alaska and Polar Regions Archives at the University of Alaska Fairbanks, among the papers and letters she discovered the glass discs, and they were then handed over to collection manager Robyn Russell who realized the importance of these discs. The discs were found to contain several songs in the Aleut language most specifically the Attuan dialect which was no longer spoken, however the discs provided valuable samples of the Attuan dialect. The first disc was transcribed by Moses Dirks in July 2016.
