= Joseph Stephenson-Jellie =

Irish cricketer

Personal information
- Full name: Joseph Stephenson-Jellie

Domestic team information
- Years: Team
- 1896–1908: Gloucestershire

Career statistics
Competition	FC
Matches	6
Runs scored	88
Batting average	8.80
100s/50s	–/–
Top score	27
Balls bowled	–
Wickets	–
Bowling average	–
5 wickets in innings	–
10 wickets in match	–
Best bowling	–
Catches/stumpings	1/–
- Source: Cricinfo, 24 June 2010

Joseph Stephenson-Jellie (1874–1960) was an Irish cricketer. Stephenson-Jellie was born in Antrim, Ireland.

Joseph Stephenson-Jellie played six first-class matches for Gloucestershire, with his debut for the county coming in 1896 against Somerset and his final first-class match for the county coming against Essex in 1908. In his six matches between 1896 and 1908, he scored 88 runs at a batting average of 8.80, with a high score of 27.

Stephenson-Jellie died in Australia in 1960.
