= Michael Silka =

American spree killer

- Born: Michael Alan Silka; August 20, 1958; Presumed Hoffman Estates, Illinois, U.S.
- Died: May 19, 1984 (aged 25); Zitziana River, near Manley Hot Springs, Alaska, U.S.
- Cause of death: Gunshot wound
- Occupations: Construction worker, drifter

Details
- Date: April 28 – May 19, 1984
- Locations: Fairbanks, Alaska and Manley Hot Springs, Alaska, U.S.
- Killed: 10 (including an unborn child)
- Injured: 1
- Weapons: Ruger No. 1 .30-06 rifle w/ 4x Weaver scope, other firearms

Michael Alan Silka (August 20, 1958 – May 19, 1984) was an American spree killer who is believed to have fatally shot ten people, with one of the murders being prior in Alaska during May 1984, primarily in the small village of Manley Hot Springs. The shooting spree culminated in a shootout with Alaska State Troopers in the Alaskan wilderness in which Silka was shot and killed. The motives for Silka's actions are officially undetermined.

== Early life ==
Michael Silka grew up in Hoffman Estates, a suburb northwest of Chicago. From an early age, Silka harbored a love of firearms and the outdoors, and had a history of encounters with the law. In 1975, Silka and another juvenile were apprehended while trying to steal camping gear and weapons from a Des Plaines sporting goods store. That same year, Silka and his brother Steve ran away from high school to the Canadian wilderness, only returning when they had depleted their provisions. In February 1977, four months before graduating from high school, Silka was arrested for carrying an antique black-powder muzzle-loading rifle—reminiscent of the weapons used by early mountain men—through a park in Hoffman Estates. He was arrested again for the same offenses later that year. Silka was convicted and fined $100.

Shortly thereafter, Silka enlisted in the United States Army, at least partly on the advice of a longtime neighbor, Forman Hurst, who later recalled him as "a good kid, a typical teenager. He loved the outdoors. That was his No. 1 ambition, to be outside exploring nature." In 1981, he was stationed at Fort Wainwright, located east of Fairbanks, Alaska, until his discharge the same year. Army records show that Silka was rated an expert marksman with the M16 rifle and grenade launcher while in basic training. However, his stay at Fort Wainwright was marked by several run-ins with military police, including an assault charge and an arrest for discharging a firearm in a barracks.

After his discharge from the Army, Silka returned to the Chicago area and worked several jobs, mostly in construction. In November 1982, he was stopped for a minor traffic violation where the officer noticed four weapons—a .44 caliber revolver, a .22 caliber semi-automatic pistol, and two knives—in his car. Silka was charged with weapons possession and resisting arrest after he refused to exit the squad car upon arriving at the station. He was convicted and spent four days in Cook County Jail. On July 21, 1983, Silka was arrested on another weapons violation after a South Barrington officer stopped him for speeding, and a .22-caliber rifle was found in the back seat. He made several court appearances, the last on October 26, before he skipped bond and fled to Alaska. A warrant for his arrest was issued on December 20. According to his younger brother Frank, Silka had been working in Alaska for some time, although he did not know what job his brother held.

== Suspected murder of Roger Culp ==
A bearded, 25-year-old drifter, Silka was first seen in Alaska in the Chena Ridge section of Fairbanks. On April 29, 1984, police had questioned Silka about fresh blood and a snow-covered mound at his cabin. At the time, the Alaska State Troopers were under the impression that they were investigating whether Silka himself had been killed. Troopers dropped the matter when Silka stuck his head out of his shack and explained that the blood was from a moose hide.

However, Silka's neighbor, Roger Culp, had gone missing the day before. Witnesses reported that Silka and Culp went into Silka's cabin, and later heard as many as eight gunshots. Apparently, witnesses had not reported the incident immediately. When Troopers obtained the new information, they returned to the cabin on May 8 with a search warrant, but Silka was gone. Red spots on the ground, by this point free of snow, were found to be human blood. At this point, Silka was wanted for questioning in Culp's disappearance, but Troopers had no leads as to his whereabouts.

== Manley Hot Springs ==
Silka was next seen on Monday, May 14, 1984, at the end of a 150-mile (240 km) dirt road (Alaska Route 2) in Manley Hot Springs, a tiny mining town of 70 people located west of Fairbanks and deep in the interior of Alaska. He was driving a battered brown and white 1974 Dodge Monaco filled with camping equipment and an aluminum canoe mounted on the roof. Unseen by villagers among the equipment were guns and ammunition. According to one resident, Robert E. Lee, Silka told the villagers that he planned to settle in the area. Silka described himself to Lee as a "mountain man". The villagers were impressed by Silka's common sense of the wilderness and survival, as well as his marksmanship. He was often seen "hanging around" a boat landing on the Tanana River, only 3 miles (5 km) outside of town. Silka had set up a tent at the boat landing and was frequently seen paddling his canoe in the Tanana.

Lee said that on Thursday, May 17 between 2 and 4 p.m., six villagers went to the boat landing, all of whom disappeared. The disappearances were not noted by the locals until the following day, at which point they contacted Alaska State Troopers in Fairbanks on Friday night. The wife of one of the missing men gave Troopers Silka's license plate number, and the police then checked and learned he was wanted for investigation of the murder of Culp. Two helicopters, three planes and the Troopers' Special Emergency Reaction Team were sent to Manley at 2 a.m. Saturday, May 19. At the boat landing, Troopers found blood, believed to be human, and used cartridge casings.

A wide helicopter search for Silka along the Tanana began at 2 a.m. At this time of year in Alaska, it was still daylight, so the search proceeded without hindrance. By the late hours of the same day, Silka was found upstream about 25 miles (40 km) southeast of Manley in an unnamed tributary of the Zitziana River (which is itself a tributary of the Tanana), near his own canoe and a motorized boat belonging to one of his victims, Fred Burk. Troopers offered Silka a chance to surrender. Instead, he stepped from behind a tree and fired a Ruger .30-06-caliber rifle at one of the airborne helicopters, penetrating the windshield and striking 34-year-old Trooper Troy L. Duncan of Fairbanks in the head, killing him instantly, and injuring Captain Donald Lawrence in the face. Trooper Jeff Hall returned fire with an M16 rifle, firing a burst on automatic from a moving helicopter. Five shots struck Silka and killed him. Troopers at the shootout said it was reminiscent of combat in the Vietnam War.

A memorial service for the victims was held at the boat landing on Sunday, May 20. Silka was cremated and his ashes were buried in the Sitka National Cemetery next to the Alaska State Trooper training academy in Alaska at his father's request. By June 23, 1984, four of the bodies—those of Burk, Lyman Klein, Dale Madajski and Larry Joe McVey—had been recovered from the Tanana River. Burk's body was discovered by his wife, Liller, about 75 miles (120 km) downstream from the scene of the killings. For months, families and friends of the victims searched the brush choked banks of the Tanana.

Troopers believe that Silka had been in Alaska about a month. It is believed that he dumped the bodies of his victims into the Tanana in the hopes that they would not be found. The Tanana is as much as a mile wide and 70 to 80 feet (21 to 24 m) deep, and as the water remains near freezing temperatures, the glacier-fed river is heavily silted, and bodies are likely to remain below the surface. The motives for Silka's actions remain unclear.

== Victims ==
- Fred Burk (also spelled Burke), 30, an Athabaskan Alaska Native homesteader, fur trapper and fisherman, whose boat was stolen by Silka
- Albert Hagen Jr., 27, Alaska Native construction worker who had just returned six weeks previous to visit his parents after a ten-year absence. Unmarried, he had been living in California previously.
- Joyce Klein, about 30, who was four months pregnant and had gone to the river for an outing with her husband and son
- Lyman Klein, 36, husband of Joyce Klein
- Marshall Klein, 2, son of Joyce and Lyman Klein
- Dale Madajski, 24, a carpenter, cabin builder
- Larry Joe McVey, 38, a trapper and disabled Vietnam veteran (he was severely injured by a booby-trapped gasoline can during the war)
- Roger Culp, 34, a wood cutter, possible victim
- Troy L. Duncan, 34, an Alaska State Trooper since August 1981 and a ten-year veteran of the U.S. Marine Corps

== See also ==
- List of rampage killers in the United States
