= Alaska Veterans Memorial =

Veteran memorial in Alaska

Coordinates: 62°44′46″N 150°07′47″W

- United States
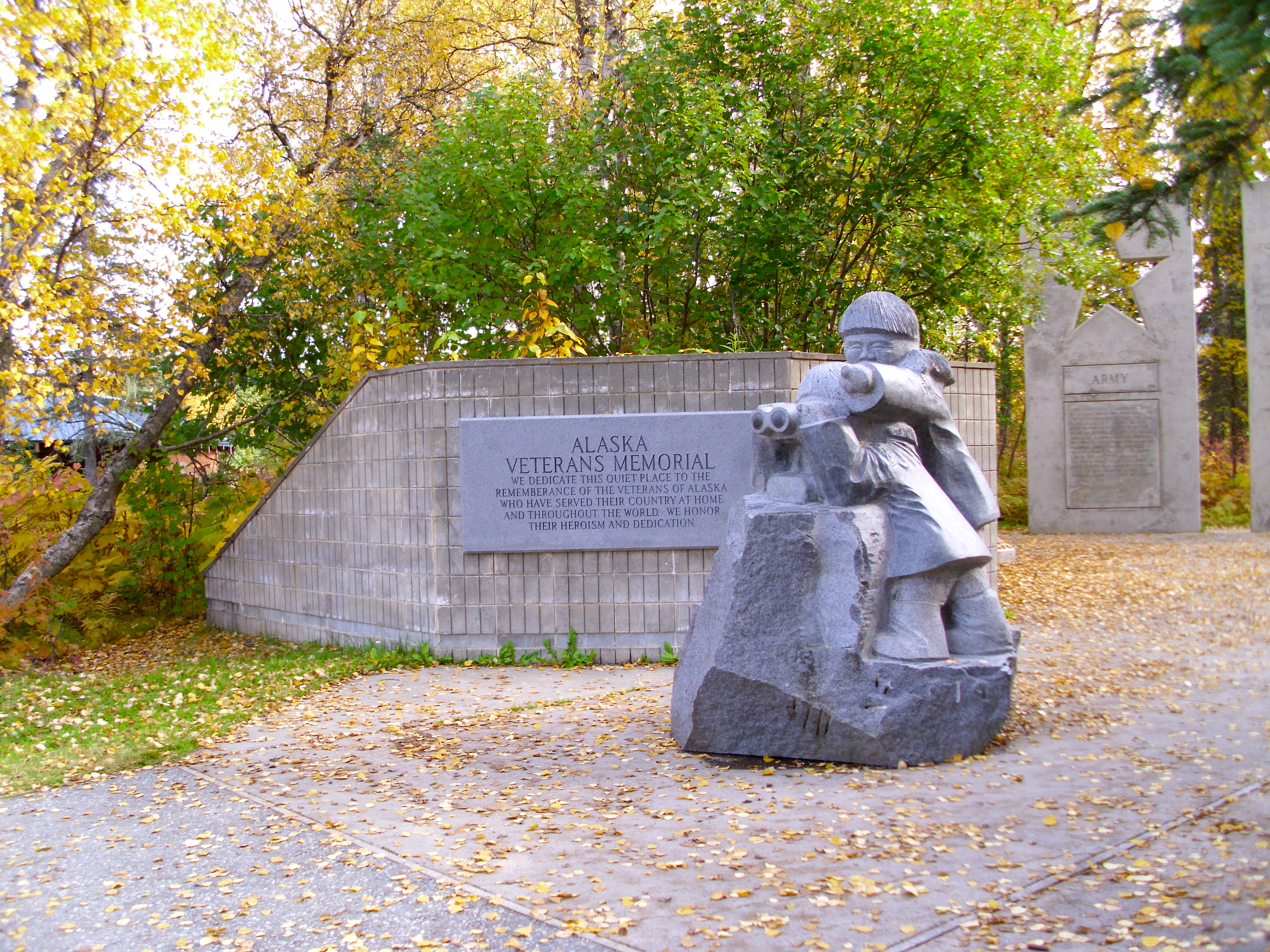
- The plaque on the left hand side reads: We dedicate this quiet place to the remembrance of the veterans of Alaska who have served their country at home and throughout the world. We honor their heroism and dedication.
- For Army, Navy, Air Force, Marine Corps, Coast Guard, Alaska National Guard, and Merchant Marine veterans from Alaska, as well as specific Alaskans who were awarded the Medal of Honor
- Established: 1983
- Location: Denali State Park near Denali
- We dedicate this quiet place to the remembrance of the veterans of Alaska who have served their country at home and throughout the world. We honor their heroism and dedication.

The Alaska Veterans Memorial is an outdoor memorial grove in Denali State Park in Interior Alaska. The memorial honors Army, Navy, Air Force, Marine Corps, Coast Guard, Alaska National Guard, and Merchant Marine veterans from Alaska, as well as specific Alaskans who were awarded the Medal of Honor. There are also small memorials to the passengers and crew of military plane crashes in Alaska. The site was selected because of the scenic beauty of the area and its location between Alaska's two largest cities. On a clear day visitors can see Denali from just outside the memorial. It is 147 miles (237 km) from Anchorage and 214 miles (344 km) from Fairbanks, on a hill above the Byers Lake campground. During the main visitor season (May–August) there is a staffed visitor center and bookstore. The main memorial alcove was constructed in 1983, Governor Bill Sheffield, himself a veteran, dedicated the site in 1984.

== Main memorial ==
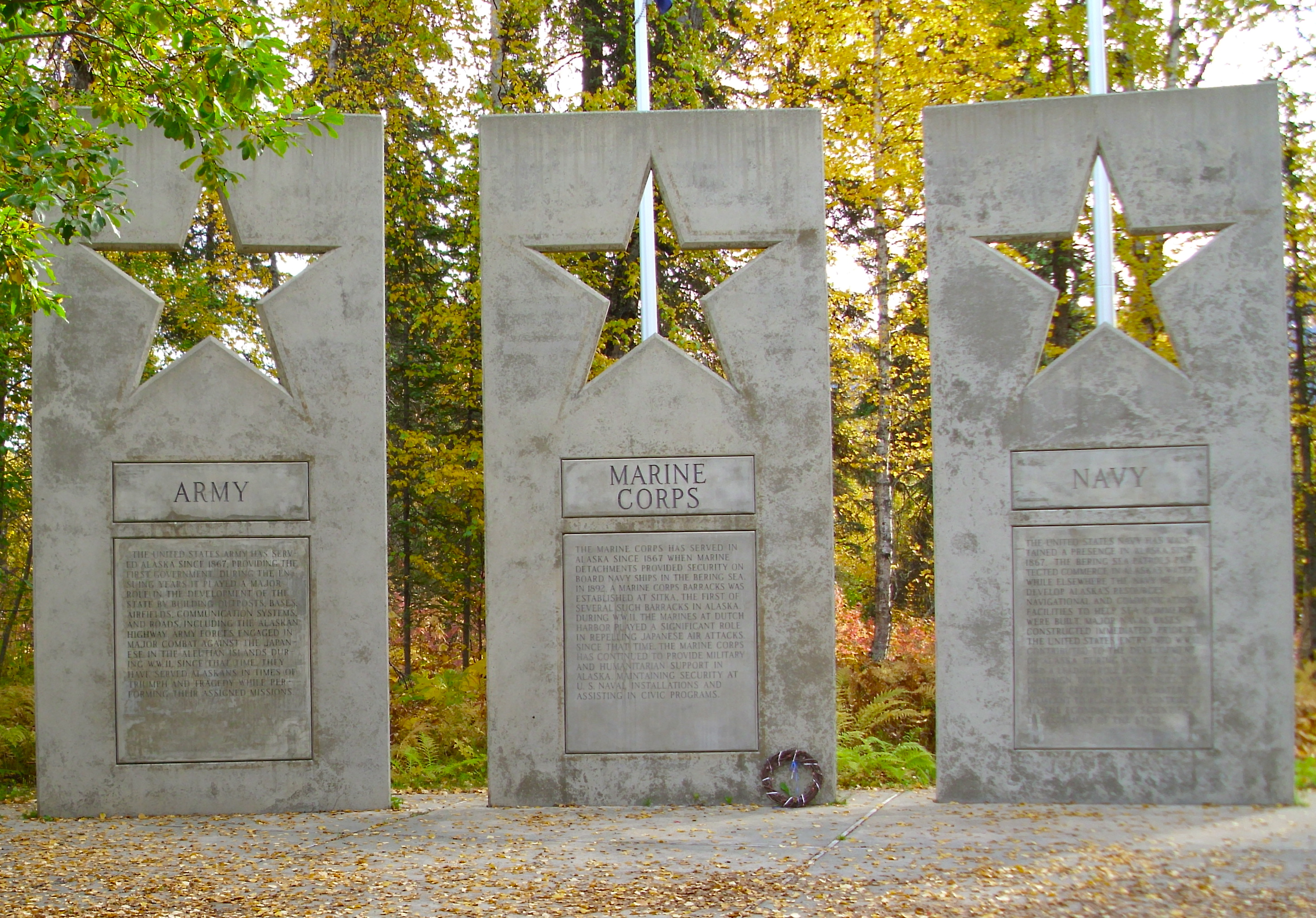
Large concrete slabs honor the five main branches of the armed forces.

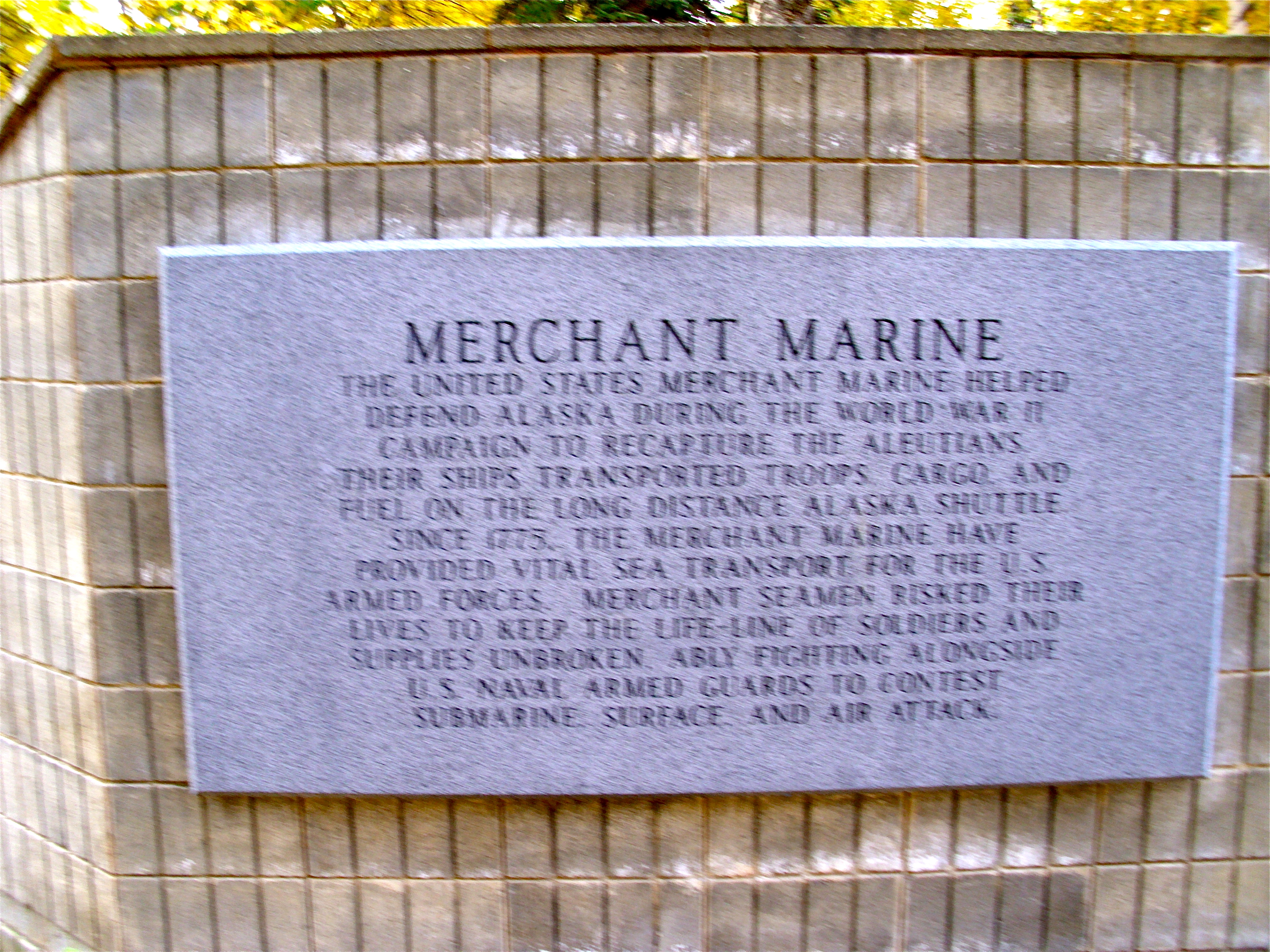
Smaller plaques at the alcove entrance honor The Merchant Marine and National Guard.

While approaching the alcove, visitors pass by small memorials honoring individual Alaskans who were awarded the Medal of Honor, including James Leroy Bondsteel, who lived in Houston, Alaska after retiring from active duty.

The main alcove of the memorial consists of five 20-foot (6.1 m) upright concrete slabs, each with a large star cut through the upper section and a description of a branch of the Armed Forces history in Alaska inscribed on the lower section. An inscribed plaque at the entrance honors the Alaska National Guard and the unpaid volunteers of the Alaska Territorial Guard, which filled in for the National Guard when it was mobilized during World War Two. The sculpture at the front of the alcove depicts two members of the Territorial Guard watching for threats with binoculars.

== Plane crash memorials ==
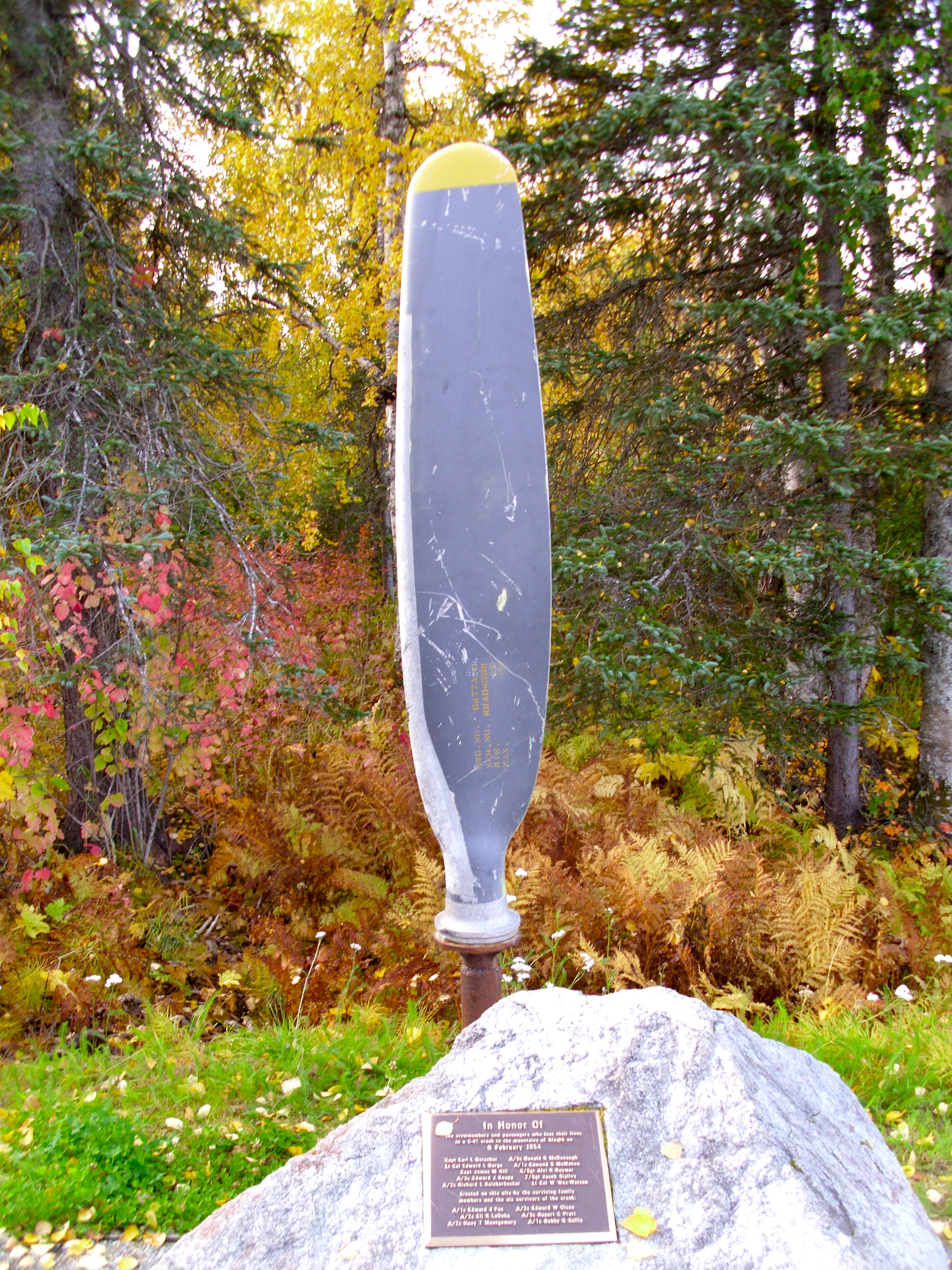
One of the propellers from the downed C-47 is used in the memorial.

Two military plane crashes in Alaska are also memorialized outside of the alcove. In February 1954 a C-47 crashed into a mountain, killing 10 of the 16 aboard. In November 1957 a TB-29 Superfortress stationed at Elmendorf Air Force Base strayed off course in bad weather and crashed in the Talkeetna Mountains, killing 6 of the 10 crew aboard at the time. One of the survivors was awarded the Soldiers Medal for his lifesaving actions while the survivors awaited rescue.
