= Curry Lookout =

- U.S. National Register of Historic Places
- Alaska Heritage Resources Survey
- Location within Alaska
- Location: Atop Curry Ridge, mile 137.2 of the Parks Highway
- Nearest city: Talkeetna, Alaska
- Coordinates: 62°37′22″N 150°05′54″W
- Area: less than one acre
- Built: 1923
- Built by: Alaska Railroad
- NRHP reference No.: 92000424
- AHRS No.: TAL-001
- Added to NRHP: April 27, 1992

The Curry Lookout, also known as Camp Regalvista, is an historic backcountry shelter in Alaska's Denali State Park. It is located on top of Curry Ridge, overlooking the Susitna River and the hamlet of Curry, a former depot on the Alaska Railroad. The only access to the shelter is via a 3-mile (4.8 km) hiking trail beginning at mile 137.2 of the Parks Highway. The shelter is a hexagonal wood-frame structure with a tent-shaped roof, and no foundation. Each side is about 6.5 feet (2.0 m) wide and 8 feet (2.4 m) high. A flagpole rises from the center of the shelter, and is secured to the structure via steel cables. The shelter was built by the railroad in 1923, the same year the Curry Hotel (no longer standing) was built. It was intended as an excursion point for visitors, providing views of the surrounding area, including Denali.

The shelter was listed on the National Register of Historic Places in 1992.

== See also ==
- National Register of Historic Places listings in Matanuska-Susitna Borough, Alaska
