= Valley Memorial Park (Alaska) =

Cemetery in Matanuska-Susitna County, Alaska, US

- Interactive map of Valley Memorial Park

Details
- Established: 1962-63
- Location: Palmer, Matanuska-Susitna Borough, Alaska
- Country: United States of America
- Coordinates: 61°33′35″N 149°2′28″W, Elevation: 121 feet (37 m)
- Type: Private
- Owned by: Angelus Memorial Park Cemetery, Inc.
- Size: 7 acres (0.028 km^{2})
- No. of graves: >1,100
- Website: Official website
- Find a Grave: Valley Memorial Park

Valley Memorial Park (also known as Valley Memory Garden and Butte Cemetery) is a cemetery in Palmer in the Matanuska-Susitna Borough, Alaska.

== See also ==
- List of cemeteries in Alaska
