= Byers Lake (Alaska) =

Lake in Alaska, United States

- Denaʼina: Quntughet'ut bena
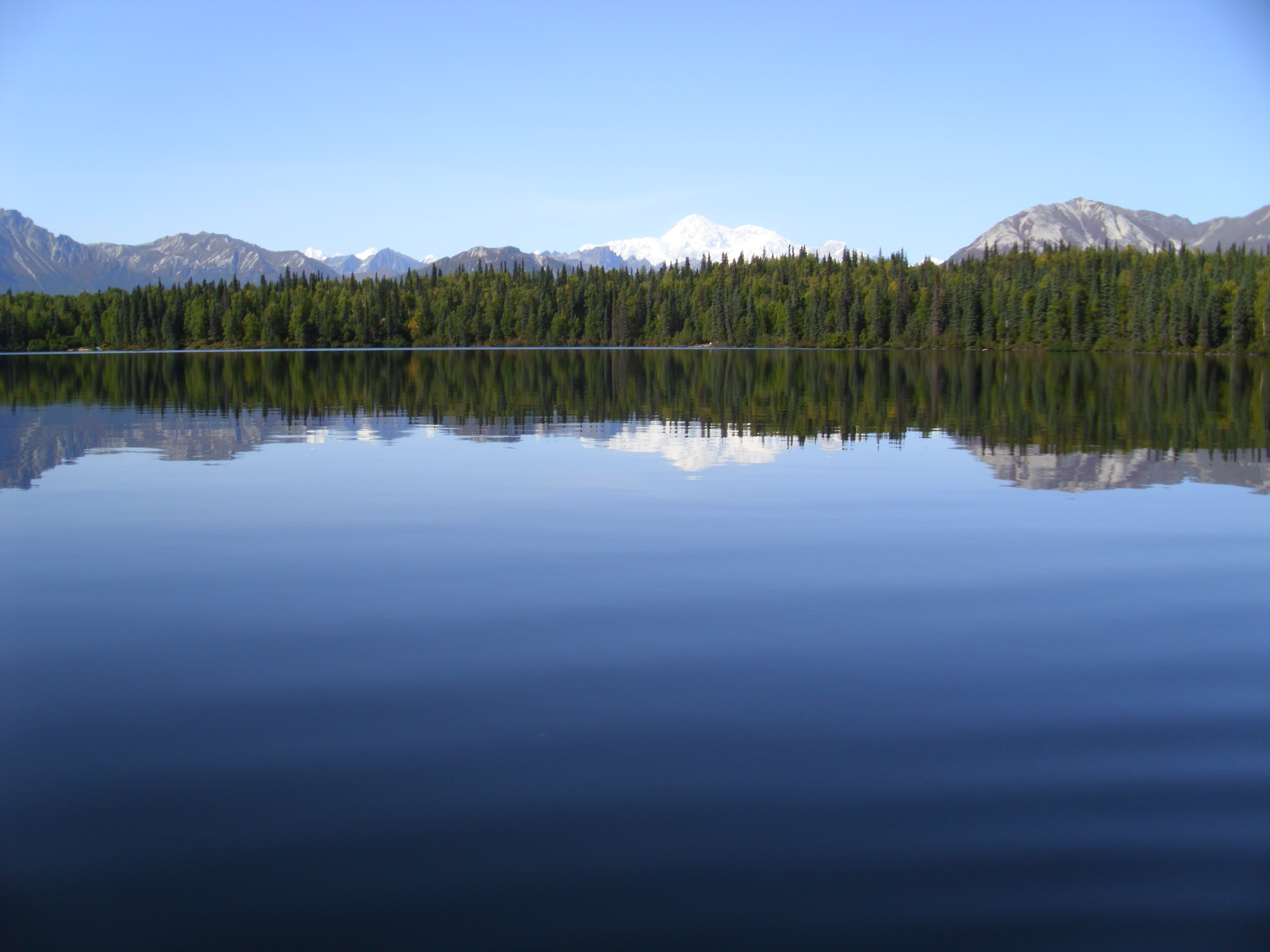
- View from the shore opposite the boat launch, with Denali and the Alaska Range reflected in the lake. Only human powered boats and electric motors are permitted at Byers Lake

- Location within Alaska Location within North America
- Location: Denali State Park, Matanuska-Susitna Borough, Alaska
- Coordinates: 62°44′23″N 150°06′40″W
- Primary inflows: Byers Creek
- Primary outflows: Byers Creek
- Basin countries: United States
- Max. length: 1.23 miles (1.98 km)
- Max. width: 0.6 miles (0.97 km)
- Surface area: 325 acres (132 ha)
- Max. depth: 160 feet (49 m)
- Shore length^{1}: 4 miles (6.4 km)
- Surface elevation: 816 feet (249 m)
- Frozen: late October-late May/early June
- Islands: none
- ^{1} Shore length is not a well-defined measure.

Byers Lake (Denaʼina: Quntughet'ut bena (Note: trans. "Lake of Where Water Comes up from Below") is a small lake in Denali State Park, within the Matanuska-Susitna Borough, Alaska, United States, 28 miles (45 km) north of Talkeetna. The lake is named for a fisherman who was brought there many times by bush pilot Don Sheldon in the 1950s. It is accessible from the George Parks Highway and has a developed campground, several public-use cabins and a small boat dock. The Alaska Veterans Memorial is on a hilltop adjacent to the lake. Gasoline-powered motors and floatplane landings are not permitted on the lake. The lake used to contain a sizable population of lake trout but due to overfishing in the time since the highway was built in 1972 the population has dwindled, and landings of lake trout are now rare, although there are still burbot in the lake as well. Migrating salmon also come into the lake but salmon fishing is not permitted. Campers are advised to keep a clean camp as the campground is frequently visited by bears. The lake is also home in summer months to trumpeter swans and common loons.

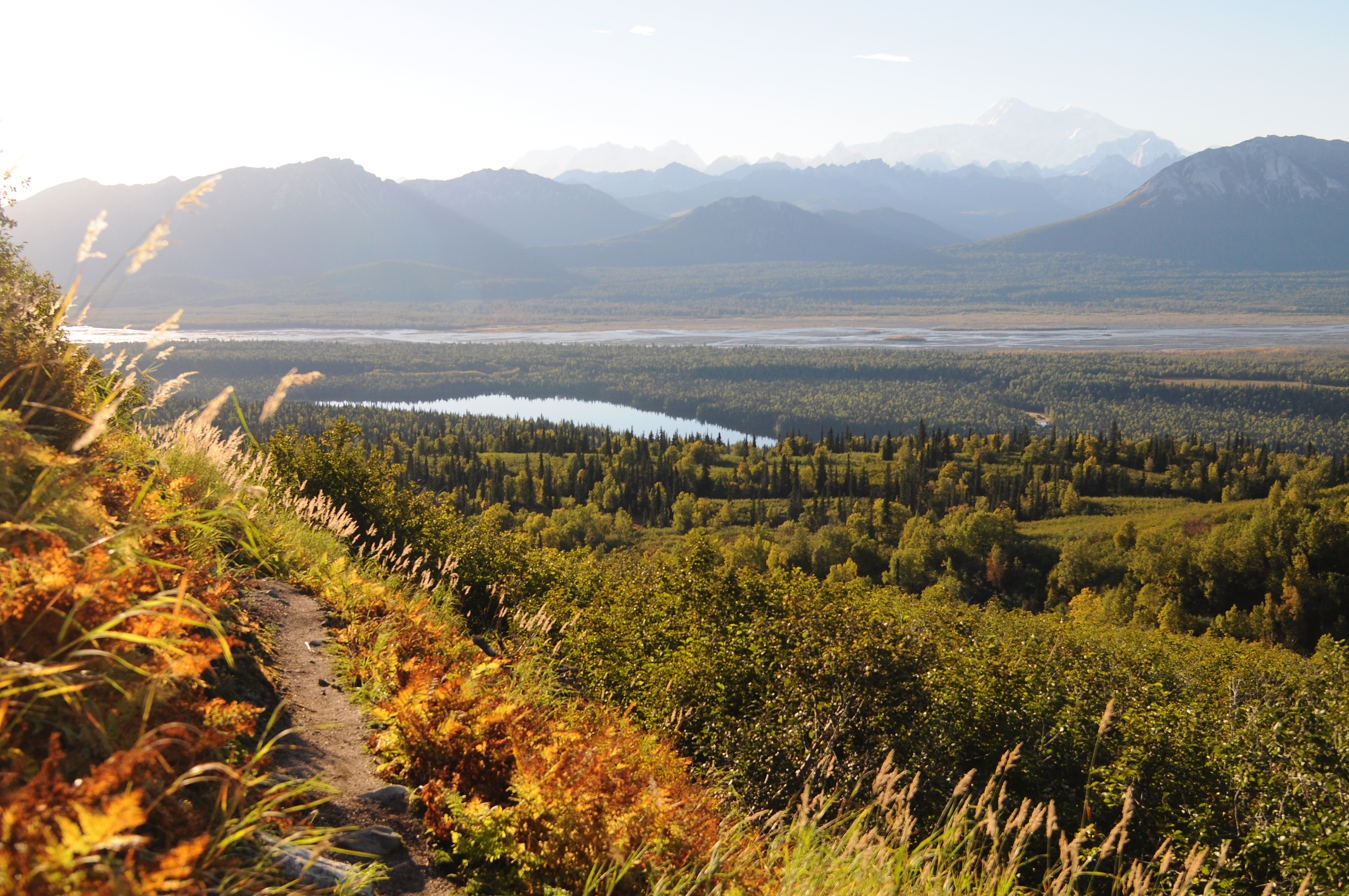
The Cascade Trail to Kesugi Ridge climbs above Byers Lake, with the Alaska Range and Denali in the background.
