= Clay Street Cemetery =

American burial site

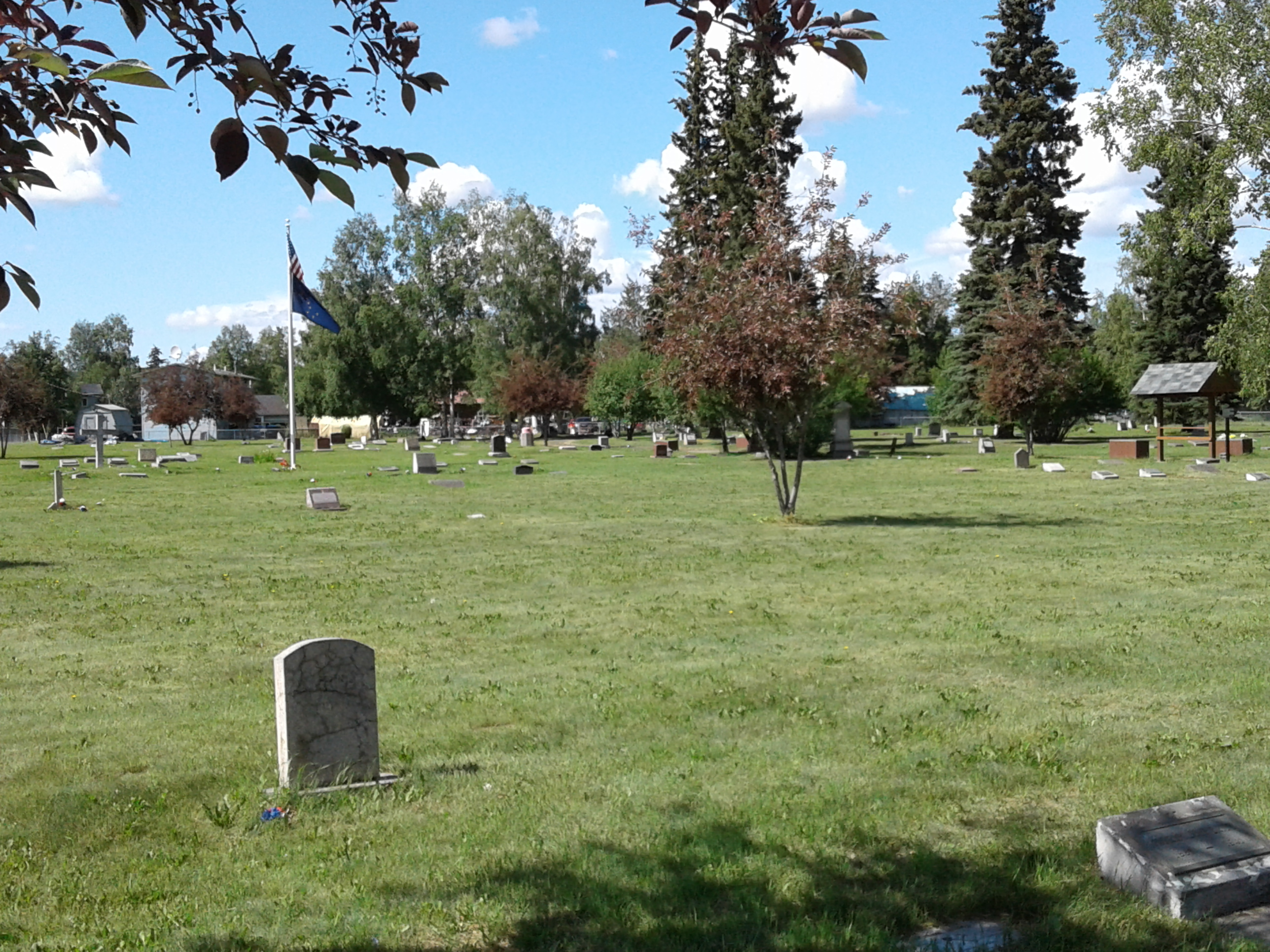
- Interactive map of Clay Street Cemetery

Details
- Established: 1903
- Location: 7th Avenue and Clay Street, Fairbanks, Alaska
- Country: United States
- Coordinates: 64°50′30″N 147°42′27″W
- Type: Public
- Owned by: City of Fairbanks
- Size: 3.5 acres (1.4 ha)
- Website: Clay Street Cemetery Commission
- Find a Grave: Clay Street Cemetery
- Clay Street Cemetery
- U.S. National Register of Historic Places
- Alaska Heritage Resources Survey
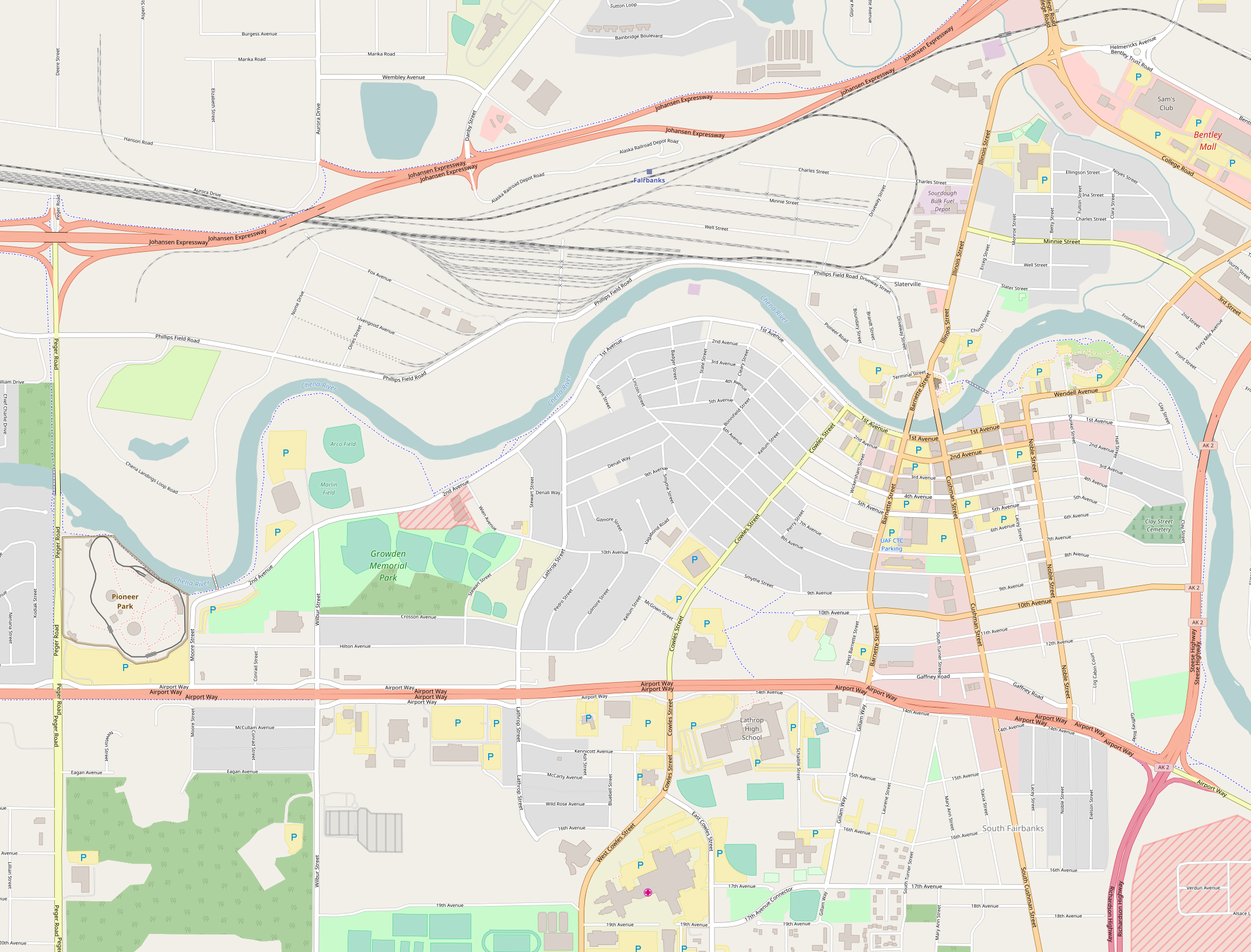
- Location within Downtown Fairbanks Location within Alaska
- Built: 1903
- NRHP reference No.: 82001619
- AHRS No.: FAI-164

Significant dates
- Added to NRHP: October 25, 1982
- Designated AHRS: May 1, 1980

Clay Street Cemetery is a cemetery located in Fairbanks, Alaska that is on the National Register of Historic Places. It was established in 1903 and contains the remains of many of Fairbanks' founders, including Mary Pedro, wife of Felix Pedro, the miner who discovered the gold that led to the city's founding.

== History ==
The Clay Street Cemetery was established in 1903 as the first cemetery of the new town of Fairbanks, founded two years before. The cemetery was located on the southeastern edge of the original townsite. Residences were built over time adjacent to the northern and western property lines. For many years, a large sawmill operated directly south of the cemetery.

The cemetery officially closed in 1938, when the City of Fairbanks established the Birch Hill Cemetery, which was far from the actual city limits at the time. Burials at Clay Street have continued, mostly sporadically. The last casket burial was of Irene Mary Sherman, a lifelong Fairbanks resident and the self-proclaimed "Queen of Fairbanks", in 1995. Burials of cremated individuals continue to occur to the present day.

The cemetery was listed on the National Register of Historic Places in 1982.

== See also ==
- List of cemeteries in Alaska
- National Register of Historic Places listings in Fairbanks North Star Borough, Alaska
