= Fort Richardson National Cemetery =

Historic veterans cemetery in Anchorage, Alaska

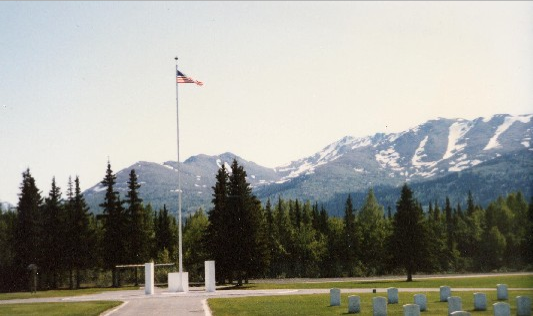
- Interactive map of Fort Richardson National Cemetery

Details
- Established: 1942–1943
- Location: Fort Richardson, Anchorage, Alaska
- Country: United States
- Coordinates: 61°16′32″N 149°39′35″W, Elevation: 367 feet (112 m)
- Type: United States National Cemetery
- Owned by: United States Army
- Size: 39 acres (16 ha)
- No. of graves: >8,000 (2021)
- Website: Official
- Find a Grave: Fort Richardson National Cemetery
- Fort Richardson National Cemetery
- U.S. National Register of Historic Places
- Location within Alaska
- Coordinates: 61°16′32″N 149°39′35″W
- NRHP reference No.: 12000056
- Added to NRHP: March 7, 2012

Fort Richardson National Cemetery is a United States National Cemetery located on the Fort Richardson United States Army installation near Anchorage, Alaska. It encompasses 39 acres (16 ha) and as of the end of 2020, it had more than 8,000 interments. For much of the year, the gravesites are inaccessible due to snowfall.

== History ==
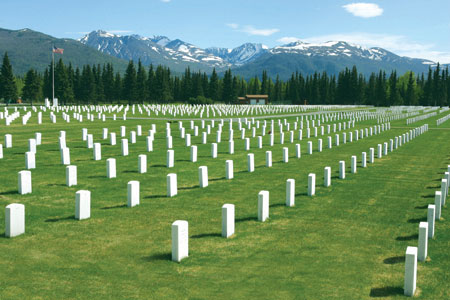
Fort Richardson National Cemetery

Established during World War II, the site was set aside to bury soldiers of any nationality who died in Alaska. After the war, many of the remains were disinterred and returned to their places of origin. Some remained at the cemetery, including 235 Japanese soldiers who died in the Battle of the Aleutian Islands which were exhumed in 1953 to be cremated in proper Shinto and Buddhist ceremonies under the supervision of Japanese government representatives. In 1981, Japanese residents of Anchorage erected a marker at the site of their interment.

On May 28, 1984, the cemetery became a National Cemetery, administered by the United States Department of Veterans Affairs.

In August 2025, Russian President Vladimir Putin visited the cemetery as part of his summit meeting with President Donald Trump.

== Notable monuments ==
- A memorial stone gateway for Major Kermit Roosevelt, erected in 1949.
- The Japan Monument, first erected in 1981 to honor the 235 Japanese interred at the cemetery. It was replaced with a new monument in 2002.

== Notable interments ==
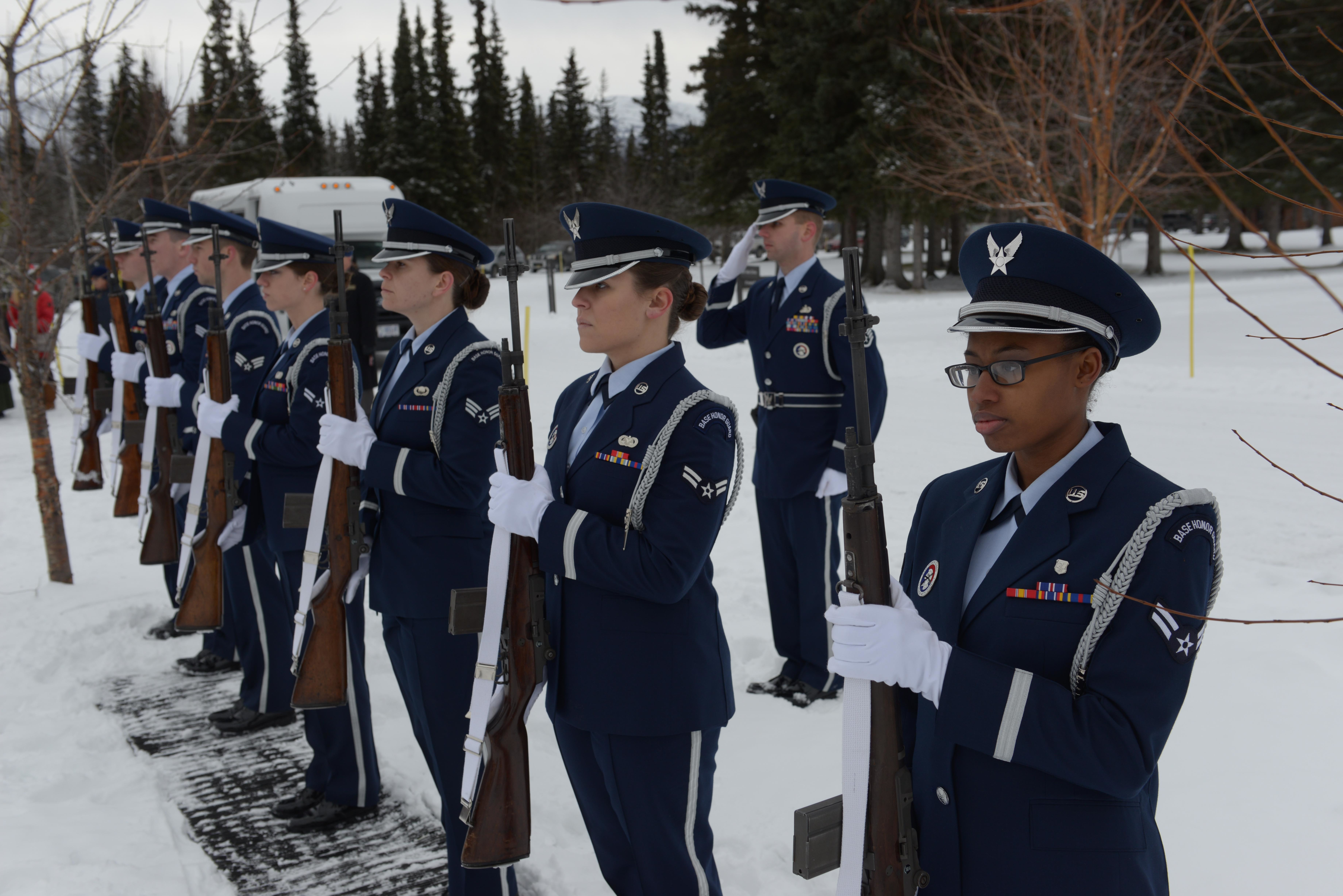
Veterans Day 2015 at Fort Richardson National Cemetery

- Charles Foster Jones (1879–1942), civilian weather observer on Attu Island who was executed by the Japanese during WWII.
- Kermit Roosevelt (1889–1943), son of President Theodore Roosevelt and Army Major during World War II.
- James Leroy Bondsteel (1947–1987), Medal of Honor recipient for action in the Vietnam War.
- Robert O. Bowen (1920–2003), novelist and essayist. Navy Veteran during WWII.

== See also ==
- List of cemeteries in Alaska
- National Register of Historic Places listings in Anchorage, Alaska
