= Denali State Park =

State park in Alaska, United States

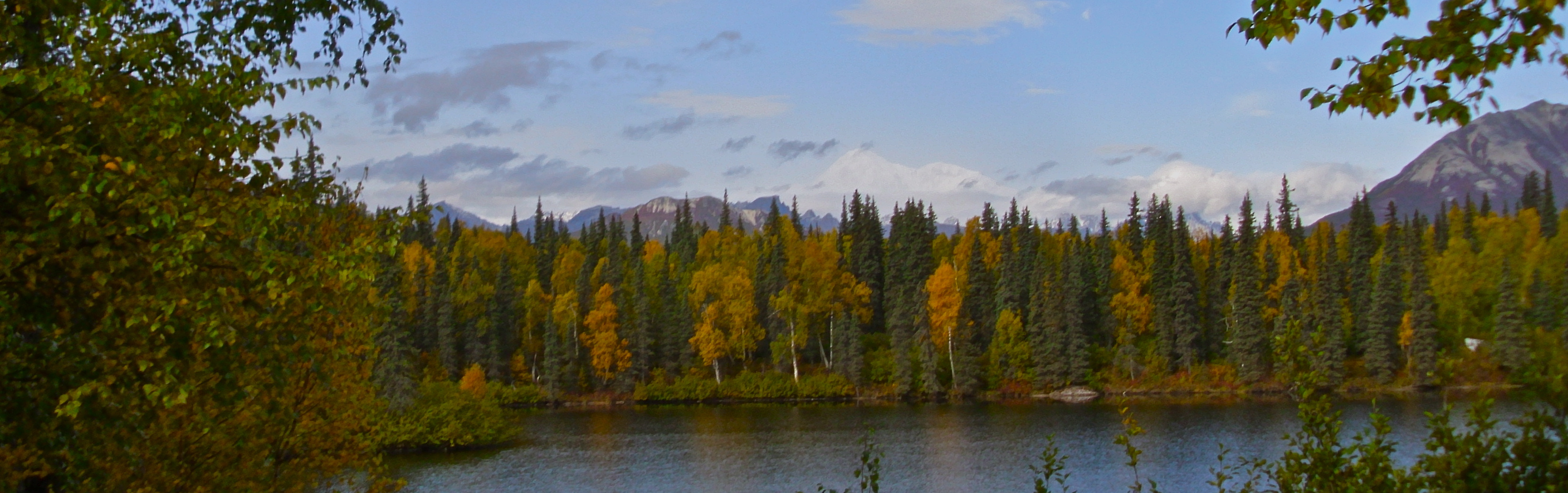
- Byers Lake view of Denali and the Alaska Range
- Interactive map of Denali State Park
- Type: Wilderness
- Location: 147.1 Parks Highway, north of Trapper Creek, Alaska, U.S.
- Coordinates: 62°46′12″N 150°03′12″W
- Area: 325,240 acres (131,620 ha)
- Created: 1970 (expanded to present size in 1976)
- Operator: Alaska State Parks

Denali State Park is a 325,240-acre (131,620 ha) state park in the U.S. state of Alaska. It is located in the Matanuska-Susitna Borough adjacent to the east side of Denali National Park and Preserve, along the Parks Highway.

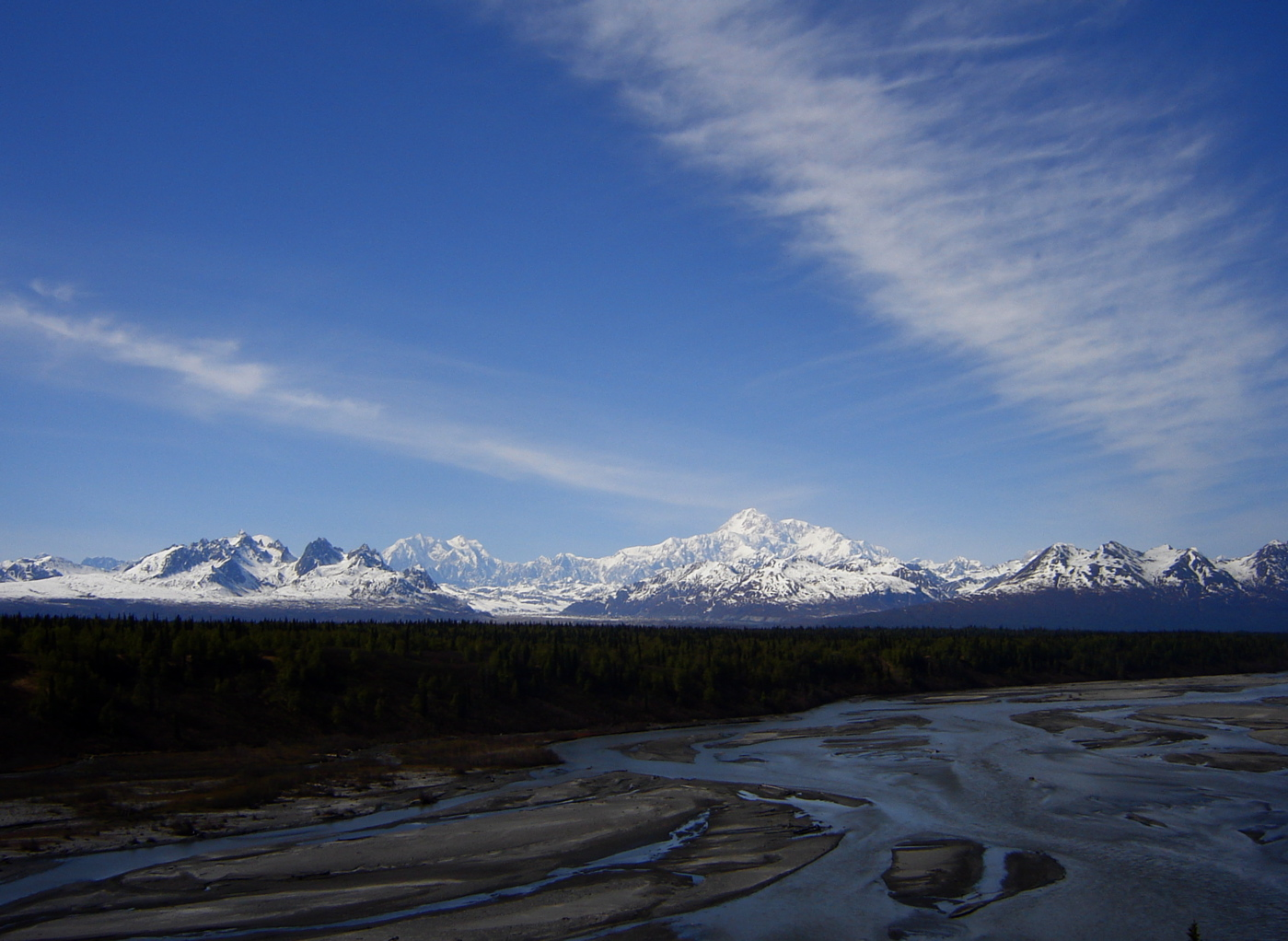
View of Alaska Range from Denali State Park

The park is undeveloped wilderness except for the two day-use areas, four campgrounds, and two trailheads accessible from the Parks Highway. These include:

- Alaska Veterans Memorial
- Denali Viewpoint South
- K'esugi Ken Campground
- Byers Lake Campground
- Denali Viewpoint North Campground
- Lower Troublesome Creek Campground
- Upper Troublesome Creek Trail (closed in 2009 due to washouts caused by severe flooding)
- Kesugi Ridge Trail
- Little Coal Creek Trail

== Overview ==
Denali State Park is located in southern Alaska on the southeastern border of the much larger Denali National Park and Preserve, formerly known as Mt. McKinley National Park. It is situated between Fairbanks and Anchorage along George Parks Highway (Alaska Route 3), which connects the two cities and runs directly through the park. This highway provides access to hiking routes and lookout points that allow visitors access to Denali and Kesugi Ridge, a popular trail in the Peters Hills area known for its views of the Alaska Range and surrounding tundra. The Alaska Range runs just north of Denali State Park and inside of Denali National Park, making the national park a more well-known tourist destination.

Denali State Park is in sight of Denali, the highest mountain peak in North America, with a summit elevation of 20,310 feet above sea level. Denali rises 18,000 feet from base to peak, making it the largest mountain situated entirely above sea level. To the east, the state park borders the Susitna River, which feeds into the Gompertz Channel near Anchorage, then into the ocean. Other rivers in the park include the Foraker, McKinley, Kantishna, Toklat, and Teklanika in the north, the Yentna, Kahiltna, and Chulitna in the south, and the Nenana at the east boundary.

== Attractions ==
The Denali State Park wilderness is a popular destination for backpacking, camping, canoeing, fishing, kayaking, rock climbing, and sightseeing. Denali is one of the main attractions, and there are easy-to-reach lookout points for visitors driving through, though it can sometimes be hard to view the peak due to clouds and other weather issues. Other peaks accessible from the park include the Talkeetna Mountains to the east, which offer different levels of climbing and backpacking experiences. Divided by a large valley, there are many different views of Alaska looking in either direction.

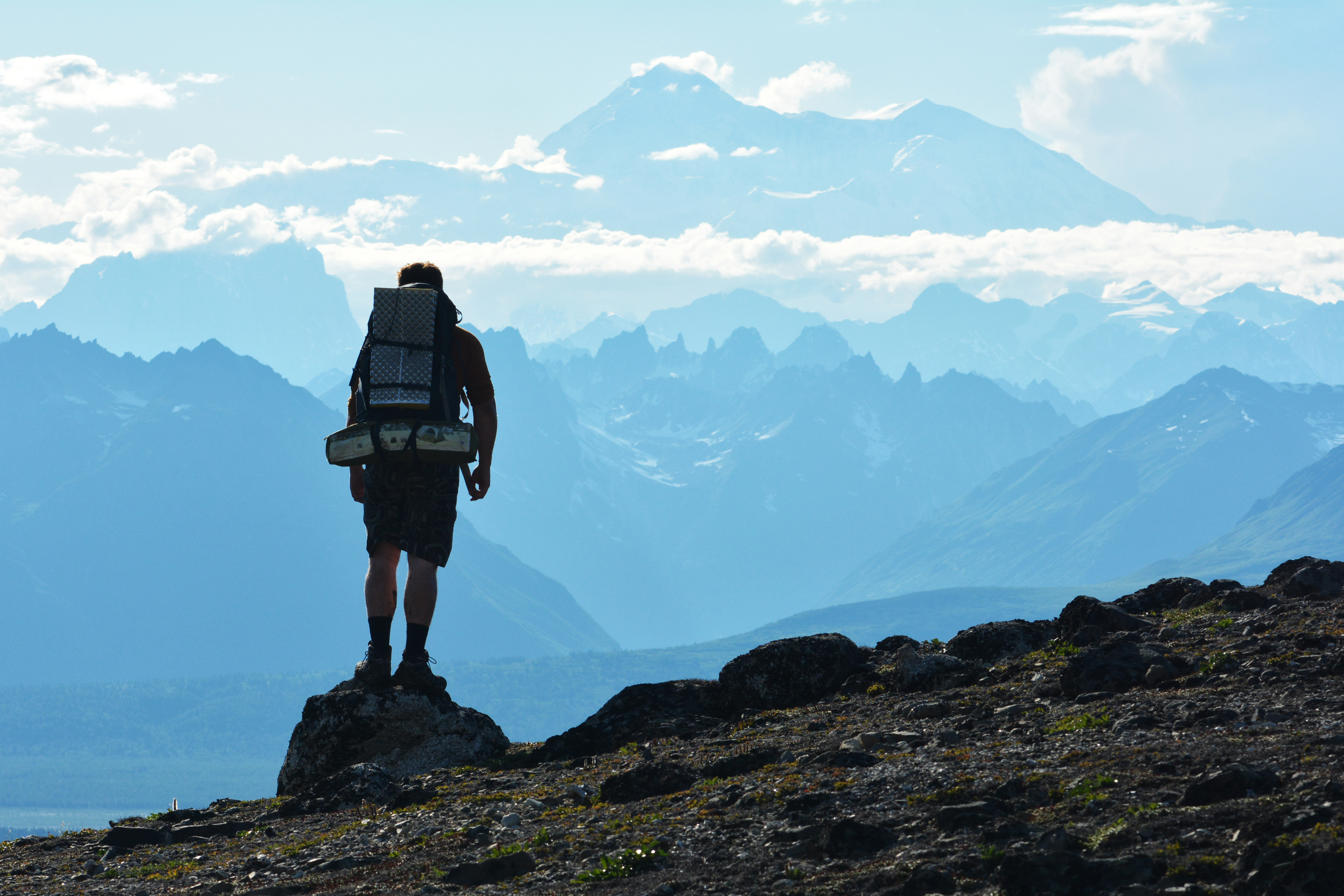
A hiker on Kesugi Ridge, looking across the valley toward Denali

The tundra on the surrounding plateau of the ranges and in the park offer a niche environment for plants and animals. This terrain also offers many small lakes for visitors to hike.

Rivers in the area allow for clearwater canoeing and rapids for various levels of canoers and kayakers. This area is also known for its salmon fishing during the season.

Since the environment is still very rugged and uninhabited it is left virtually wild.

During summer, there are almost 21 hours of constant daylight every day, with the sun barely dropping behind the horizon. The temperature stays at or below 80 degrees Fahrenheit during the summer but can drop to -40 degrees Fahrenheit in the winter, with snow covering most of the land. During all of the seasons, the surrounding glaciers in the area can be visited, and their distinct runoff paths can be seen.

=== State recreation sites ===
In addition to the main park, the area hosts two small, minimally developed state recreation sites founded in 1994: the Blair Lake State Recreation Site and the Tokositna River State Recreation Site.

== Wildlife ==
The flora and fauna in the park comprise a very diverse habitat. Visitors may see animals including black and grizzly bears, beavers, moose, and smaller ground mammals. Certain seasons attract insects such as mosquitos, so visitors should be prepared. Many unique bird species exist in the park, including certain water birds. Loons, ospreys, and trumpeter swans are attracted to the park's many lakes and streams. Fishing the clear streams also provides the opportunity to see many different types of fish; for example, these streams spawn all five species of Pacific salmon.

The tundra is also home to many unique plant species which can survive the winter and summer without dying, and along waterways, many different trees and plants can be found.

== See also ==
- Curry Lookout
- List of Alaska state parks
