= Birch Hill Cemetery =

Cemetery in Fairbanks North Star Borough, Alaska

Coordinates: 64°51′37″N 147°40′17″W

- Interactive map of Birch Hill Cemetery

Details
- Established: 1938
- Location: Fairbanks, Alaska

Birch Hill Cemetery is a cemetery in Fairbanks, Alaska. It was laid out on a hillside overlooking the city in 1938 as a secondary option to the Clay Street Cemetery. The cemetery is divided into different sections, including some set aside for Alaska Natives and Catholics, as well as fraternal organizations like the Eagles and Masons. For many years, the municipally run cemetery was known for its collection of folk monuments and natural landscape, both in some ways expressions of Alaskan notions of individualism and freedom from the regulations common in cemeteries elsewhere in the United States. Among those buried there are Klondike miner Elam Harnish, whose story inspired Jack London in the novel Burning Daylight and Territorial Governor Michael Stepovich.

There are stories of ghosts being sighted, the most prominent being the White Lady.

The cemetery was profiled on the PBS documentary A Cemetery Special.
