= ML-007 =

Experimental muscarinic drug

Clinical data
- Other names: ML007; ML-007/PAC; ML007/PAC
- Routes of administration: Oral
- Drug class: Muscarinic acetylcholine M_{1} and M_{4} receptor agonist

ML-007 is a selective muscarinic acetylcholine M_{1} and M_{4} receptor agonist which is under development for the treatment of schizophrenia, psychotic disorders, and dyskinesias. It is being developed in combination with a peripherally selective muscarinic acetylcholine receptor antagonist (also known as ML-007/peripherally acting anticholinergic or ML-007/PAC). The drug is taken orally.

It produces antipsychotic-like effects in rodents, including inhibition of amphetamine and phencyclidine (PCP)-induced hyperlocomotion and activity in the conditioned avoidance response test. These effects appear to dependent on activation of both muscarinic acetylcholine M_{1} and M_{4} receptors. The drug is approximately 10-fold more potent than xanomeline in these tests.

As of January 2024, ML-007 is in phase 1 clinical trials for schizophrenia, psychotic disorders, and dyskinesias. It is under development by MapLight Therapeutics. The drug is a small molecule, but its chemical structure does not seem to have been disclosed.

== See also ==
- List of investigational antipsychotics
- Emraclidine
- NBI-1117568
- NS-136
- Xanomeline/trospium (KarXT)
