= Revosimeline =

Muscarinic agonist

Clinical data
- Drug class: Muscarinic acetylcholine receptor agonist

Identifiers
- IUPAC name: ethyl (1S,5R)-3-(3-oxo-2,8-diazaspiro[4.5]decan-8-yl)-8-azabicyclo[3.2.1]octane-8-carboxylate
- CAS Number: 1810001-96-7
- PubChem CID: 133082878
- ChemSpider: 71115963
- UNII: 9GHO88L89C

Chemical and physical data
- Formula: C_{18}H_{29}N_{3}O_{3}
- Molar mass: 335.448 g·mol^{−1}
- 3D model (JSmol): Interactive image
- SMILES: CCOC(=O)N1[C@@H]2CC[C@H]1CC(C2)N3CCC4(CC3)CC(=O)NC4
- InChI: InChI=1S/C18H29N3O3/c1-2-24-17(23)21-13-3-4-14(21)10-15(9-13)20-7-5-18(6-8-20)11-16(22)19-12-18/h13-15H,2-12H2,1H3,(H,19,22)/t13-,14+,15?; Key:IXAHYSYEIHSUAG-YIONKMFJSA-N

Revosimeline is a muscarinic acetylcholine receptor agonist which has not been marketed at this time. It is said to be an agonist of the muscarinic acetylcholine M_{1} receptor. The drug appears to be structurally distinct from earlier muscarinic acetylcholine receptor agonists like milameline and xanomeline. Its INN was designated in 2018.
