= Itameline =

Muscarinic agonist

Clinical data
- Other names: RU-47213; RU47213
- Drug class: Non-selective muscarinic acetylcholine receptor agonist

Identifiers
- IUPAC name: (4-chlorophenyl) 5-[(E)-methoxyiminomethyl]-3,6-dihydro-2H-pyridine-1-carboxylate
- CAS Number: 145071-44-9 145071-44-9
- PubChem CID: 9571042
- ChemSpider: 7845508
- UNII: 5VO597V509
- ChEMBL: ChEMBL2105092

Chemical and physical data
- Formula: C_{14}H_{15}ClN_{2}O_{3}
- Molar mass: 294.74 g·mol^{−1}
- 3D model (JSmol): Interactive image
- SMILES: CO/N=C/C1=CCCN(C1)C(=O)OC2=CC=C(C=C2)Cl
- InChI: InChI=1S/C14H15ClN2O3/c1-19-16-9-11-3-2-8-17(10-11)14(18)20-13-6-4-12(15)5-7-13/h3-7,9H,2,8,10H2,1H3/b16-9+; Key:CTVQNEVLCGSTKL-CXUHLZMHSA-N

Itameline (INN; developmental code name RU-47213) is a non-selective muscarinic acetylcholine receptor agonist nootropic drug which was under development for the treatment of Alzheimer's disease and memory disorders but was never marketed.

Itameline is a prodrug of an arecoline derivative. It is an agonist of the muscarinic acetylcholine M_{1} receptor as well as of other muscarinic acetylcholine receptors. Itameline is described as being superior to arecoline in terms of potency, central selectivity, and duration of action. The drug shows antiamnesic effects in animals, for instance reversing scopolamine-induced memory deficits. Structurally, it is a tetrahydropyridine similarly to xanomeline and milameline.

Itameline was first described in the scientific literature by 1992. It was under development by Hoechst Marion Roussel and reached phase 2 clinical trials by 1998 prior to discontinuation of development.
