= Alvameline =

Chemical compound

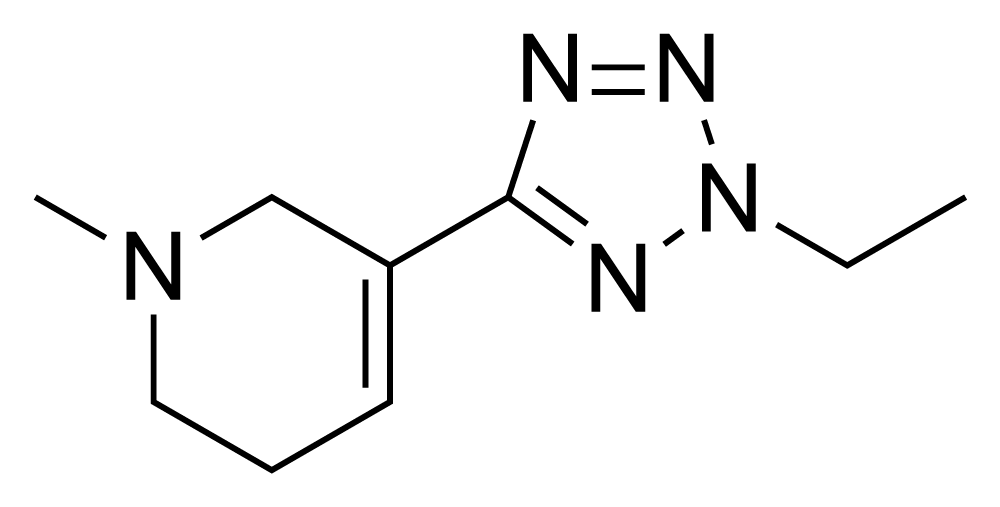

Clinical data
- ATC code: None

Identifiers
- IUPAC name: 3-(2-ethyltetrazol-5-yl)-1-methyl-5,6-dihydro-2H-pyridine
- CAS Number: 120241-31-8
- PubChem CID: 178030
- ChemSpider: 154980
- UNII: 4XFD7B36M6
- ChEMBL: ChEMBL131428
- CompTox Dashboard (EPA): DTXSID30152748

Chemical and physical data
- Formula: C_{9}H_{15}N_{5}
- Molar mass: 193.254 g·mol^{−1}
- 3D model (JSmol): Interactive image
- SMILES: n1nn(nc1\C2=C\CCN(C)C2)CC
- InChI: InChI=1S/C9H15N5/c1-3-14-11-9(10-12-14)8-5-4-6-13(2)7-8/h5H,3-4,6-7H2,1-2H3; Key:RNMOMKCRCIRYCZ-UHFFFAOYSA-N

Alvameline (Lu 25-109) is a M_{1} receptor agonist and M_{2}/M_{3} receptor antagonist that was under investigation for the treatment of Alzheimer's disease, but produced poor results in clinical trials and was subsequently discontinued.

== See also ==
- Milameline
- Sabcomeline
- Tazomeline
- Xanomeline
