= Sabcomeline =

Chemical compound

Clinical data
- ATC code: None

Legal status
- Legal status: Never marketed

Identifiers
- IUPAC name: (3Z,3R)-N-methoxy-1-azabicyclo[2.2.2]octane-3-carboximidoyl cyanide
- CAS Number: 159912-53-5; HCl: 159912-58-0
- PubChem CID: 9577995
- IUPHAR/BPS: 306
- ChemSpider: 7852359
- UNII: P8P92V596C; HCl: A24BK93DRR
- ChEMBL: ChEMBL134641
- CompTox Dashboard (EPA): DTXSID101028868

Chemical and physical data
- Formula: C_{10}H_{15}N_{3}O
- Molar mass: 193.250 g·mol^{−1}
- 3D model (JSmol): Interactive image
- SMILES: C2CC1CCN2CC1\C(\C#N)=N\OC

Sabcomeline (Memric; SB-202,026) is a selective M_{1} receptor partial agonist that was under development for the treatment of Alzheimer's disease. It made it to phase III clinical trials before being discontinued due to poor results.

It is a non-selective agonist of all five muscarinic acetylcholine receptors with similar affinities. However, functional selectivity for the M_{1} receptor has been claimed in vitro and in vivo.

== See also ==
- List of investigational cognition and memory disorder drugs
- Alvameline
- Milameline
- Tazomeline
- Xanomeline
