= Stanford Institutes of Medicine Summer Research Program =

Highly competitive 8-week research program held annually

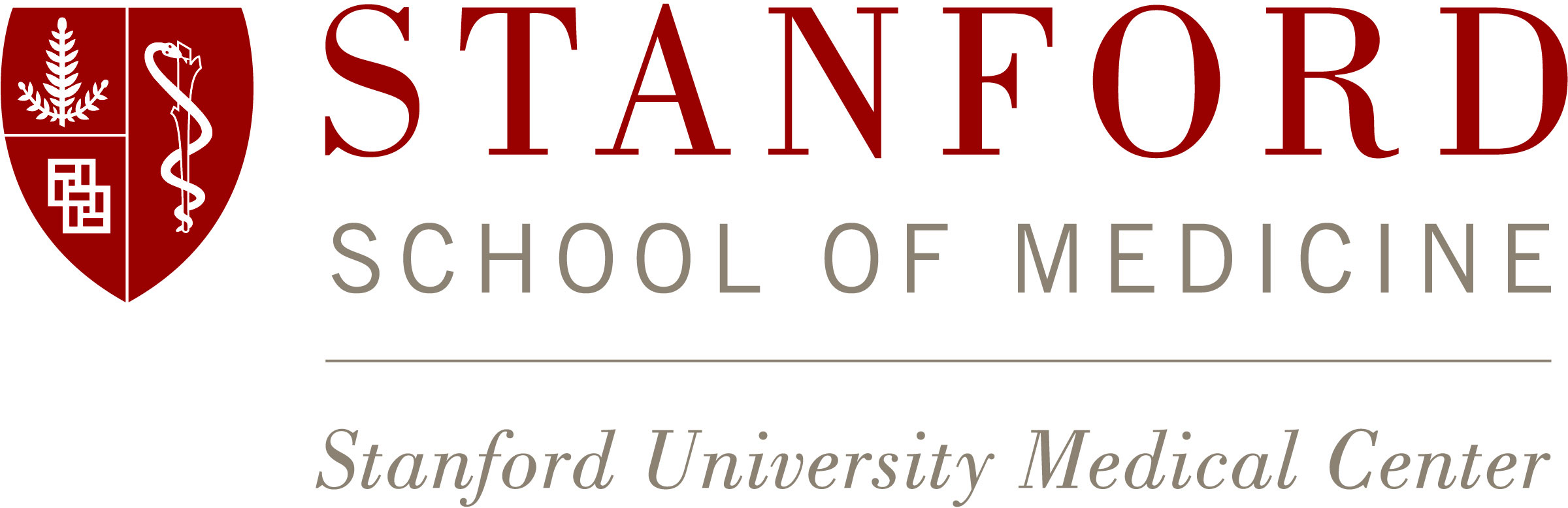
The Stanford School of Medicine logo.

The Stanford Institutes of Medicine Summer Research Program, sometimes referred to as the Stanford Institutes of Medical Research (SIMR), is a highly competitive 8-week research program held annually for approximately 60 students from the United States entering their final year of high school or first year of college. Widely regarded as one of the most prestigious internship programs in the country, SIMR was founded by P.J. Utz in 1998 as the Center for Clinical Immunology Summer Research Program. SIMR is run by Stanford University at the Stanford School of Medicine and is targeted towards students with an interest in science, engineering, and medicine.

== History ==
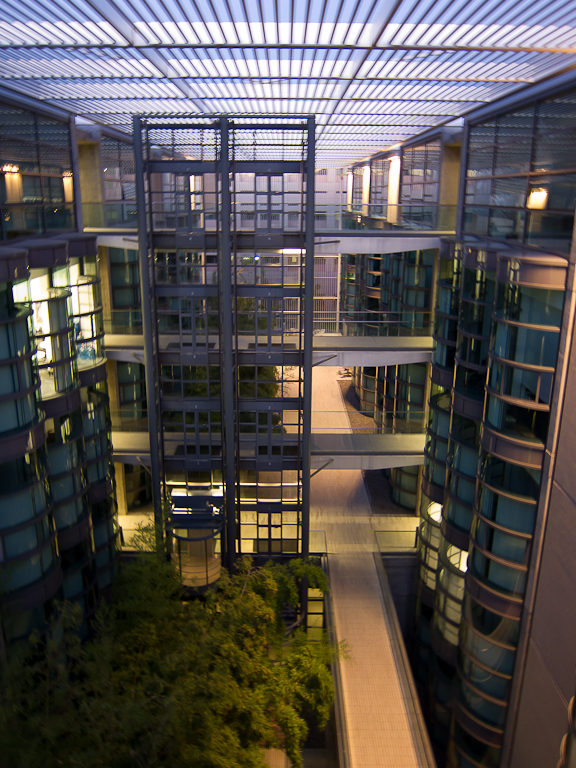
The Center for Clinical Sciences Research, which houses CCIS and core facilities available to interns.

The Stanford Institutes of Medicine (SIM) Summer Research Program was founded in 1998 as the CCIS Summer Research Program. The program was initially run by the Center for Clinical Immunology at Stanford. The goals of the program included increasing interest in biological sciences and immunology among high school students in the San Francisco Bay Area, California, and the United States.

In 2000, 10 interns participated. In 2001, the number increased to 20 interns and remained at 20 to 25 interns through the summer of 2007. Funding for the program has since been provided by Genentech, the Howard Hughes Medical Institute, the National Institute of Allergy and Infectious Disease's Asofsky Program, FOCIS, and private donors. In 2007, the Stanford Institute for Immunology, Transplantation and Infection cosponsored the program (called the CCIS/ITI Summer Intern Program).

In 2008, the program teamed up with five Stanford Institutes that study cancer biology, stem cell biology, neuroscience, immunology and cardiovascular medicine. The program was renamed the Stanford Institutes of Medicine Summer Research Program, or SIMR.

== Overview and structure ==
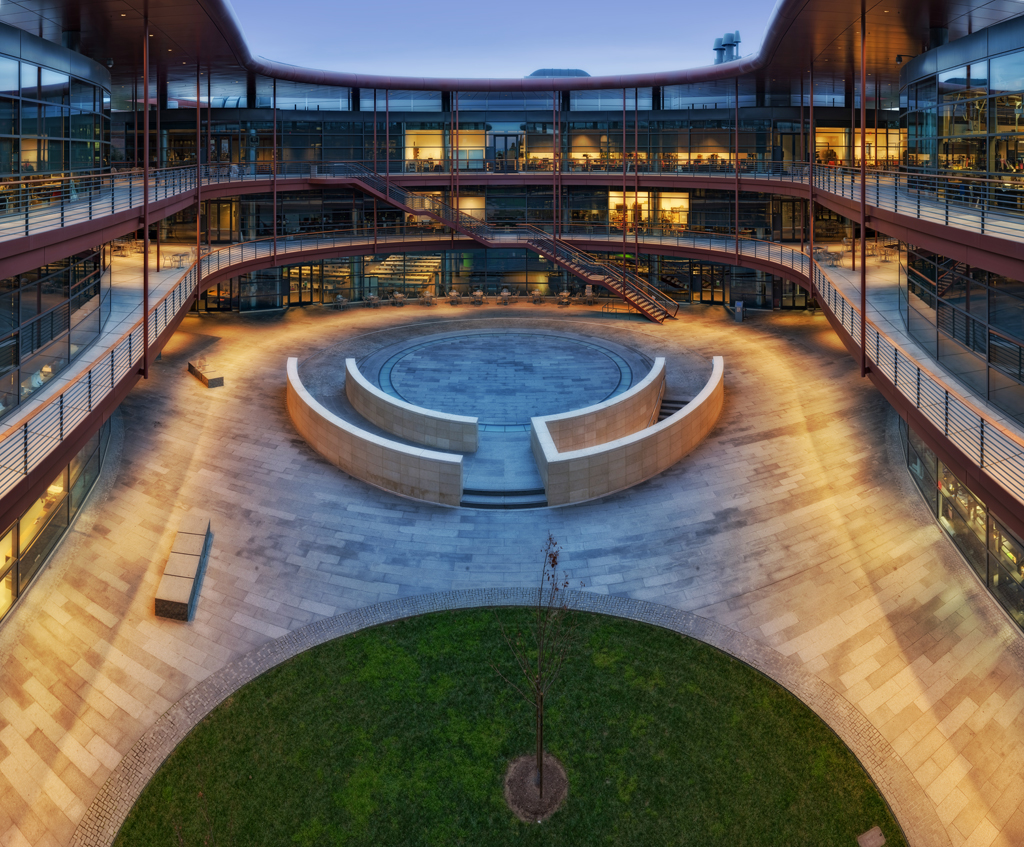
The Clark Center, home to Stanford's Bio-X program

Student apply to the program in the period between December and February preceding the summer. In 2013, 3.2% of applicants were accepted to the program. The application process entails submission of objective criteria including a transcript of grades and test scores; a resume of research experience and volunteer work; a summary of extracurricular activities, honors, and awards; letters of recommendation; and several essays detailing interests and goals in science.

Admitted students choose one of eight institutes (Immunology, Stem Cell Biology, Neurobiology, Cardiovascular Medicine, Cancer Biology, Bioinformatics, Bioengineering, and Genetics) to join, attending lectures by faculty, postdocs, and grad students within their respective institute for the first half of the program. Throughout the program, interns are required to work at least 40 hours a week in a lab of their choice with a Stanford grad student, postdoc, or faculty member on a hypothesis-driven research question, though most work more.

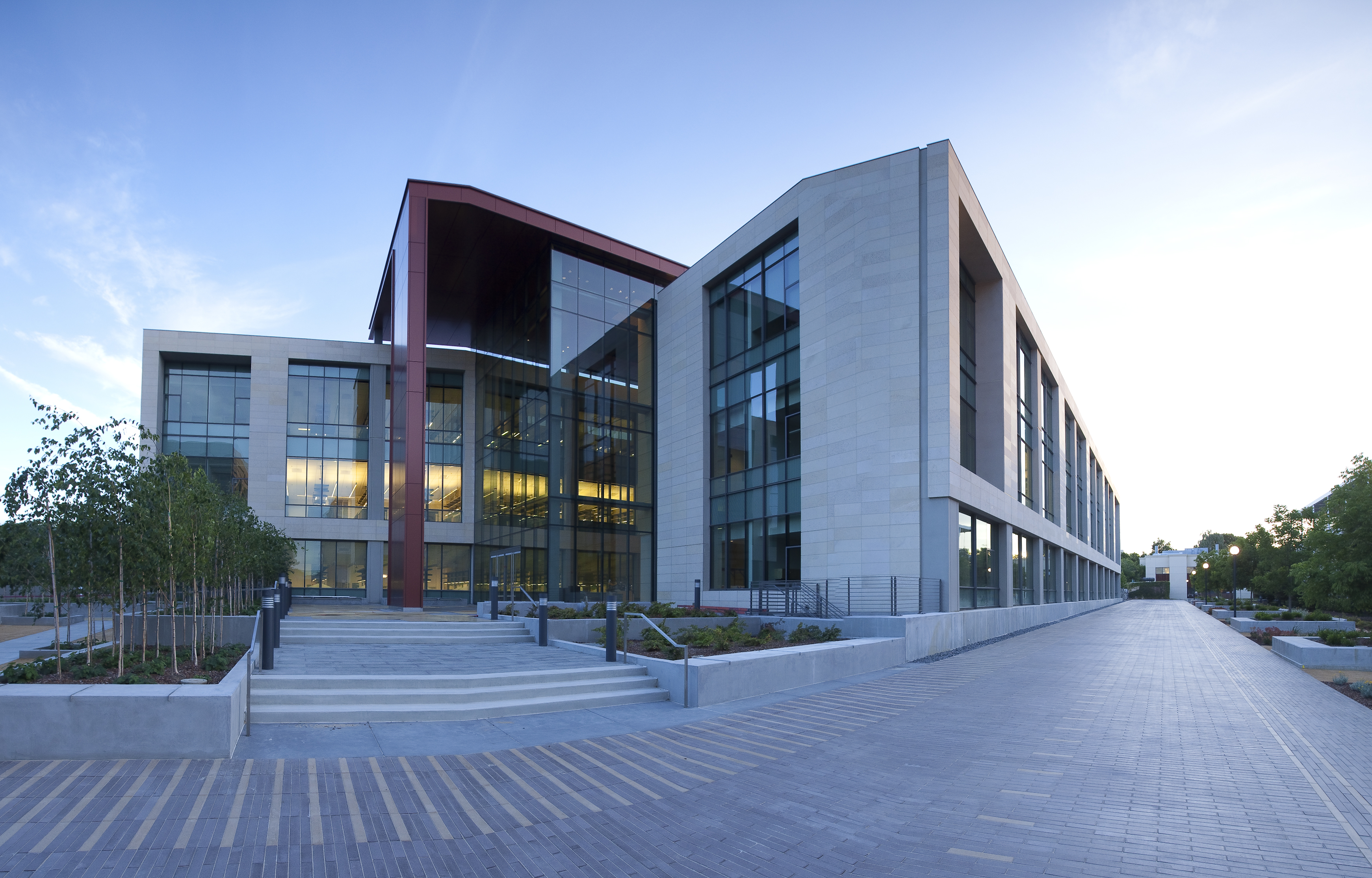
The Lorry I. Lokey Building, home to the Stem Cell Institute.

Interns have the opportunity to regularly attend core faculty talks specifically for entire SIMR class (rather than a specific institute within SIMR), thesis defenses, lab meetings, and symposia, as well as lunches with other interns and social events on Stanford's campus. Several notable faculty, such as Nobel laureate Brian Kobilka, Irving Weissman, Lawrence Steinman, and Atul Butte have given talks at SIMR. A hallmark of the program is a trip to the nearby Agilent Technologies in Santa Clara as well as several seminars intended to expose participants to opportunities and potential pathways in science and medicine. Many events are intended to provide interns the opportunity to interact with peers while networking with professionals in academia (at Stanford) and in industry. Interns have access to institute-specific TAs, college and career advising, as well as guidance for research publication and science fairs.

Upon completion of the program, interns are expected to deliver a 10-minute presentation open to members of the medical school. The program concludes with a poster session held for sponsors of the program, such as CIRM and the Arthritis Foundation, and the general public alike. Interns receive a stipend for their research along with a certificate of completion at the closing ceremony. Many interns choose to pursue their internship beyond the dates of the program.

== Accomplishments ==
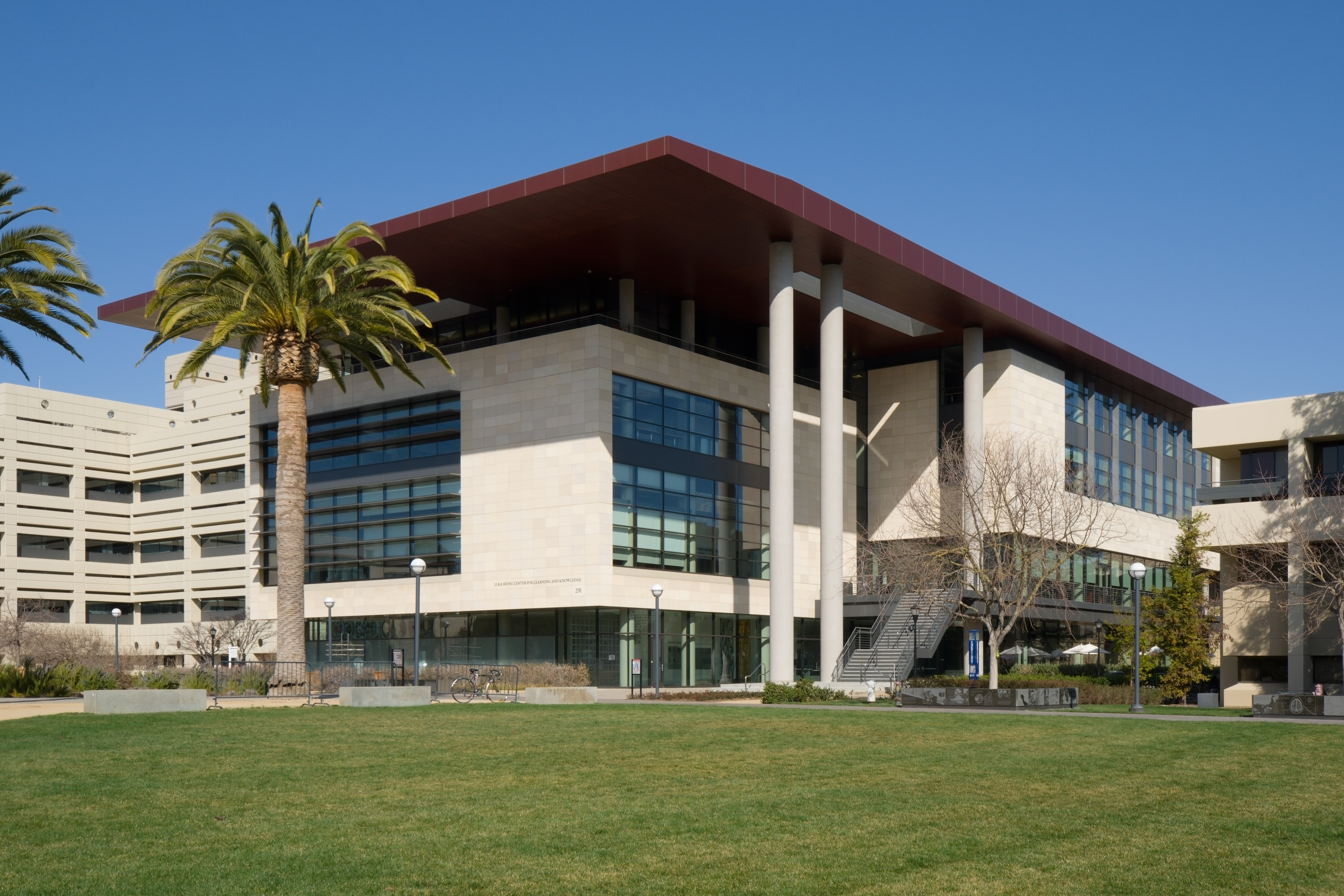
The Li Ka Shing Center, in which several social events and institute lectures are held.

Several participants have been named semifinalists and finalists in the Intel Science Talent Search. In addition, two interns have been named semifinalists in the Siemens Competition, and one student was named a Presidential Scholar by George W. Bush.

Over 80% of the students in the first six classes have gone on to major in science in college or are pursuing careers in research, medicine, or engineering-related fields. Students from graduating classes have entered college as well as medical and graduate school at universities including Stanford, Harvard, MIT, Yale, Princeton, Caltech, Penn, UC Berkeley, Johns Hopkins, and Duke. Furthermore, a few alumni are admitted each year to combined 7- or 8-year undergraduate/medical school programs, such as Northwestern University's Honors Program in Medical Education (HPME) and Brown's Program in Liberal Medical Education (PLME).

In 2007, approximately twenty interns coauthored publications on their research in highly respected peer-reviewed journals, such as Nature Medicine, Blood, PNAS, and Science during their time in the program.
