= Neurocrine =

Neurocrine can refer to:

- A type of cell signaling similar to paracrine, but involving neurons. See chemical synapse for more details.
- Neurocrine Biosciences
- Any molecule secreted by a nerve cell: Lipids, Gases, Peptides, Purines, Amine, Amino acids, Acetylcholine
