= VU-0238429 =

Chemical compound

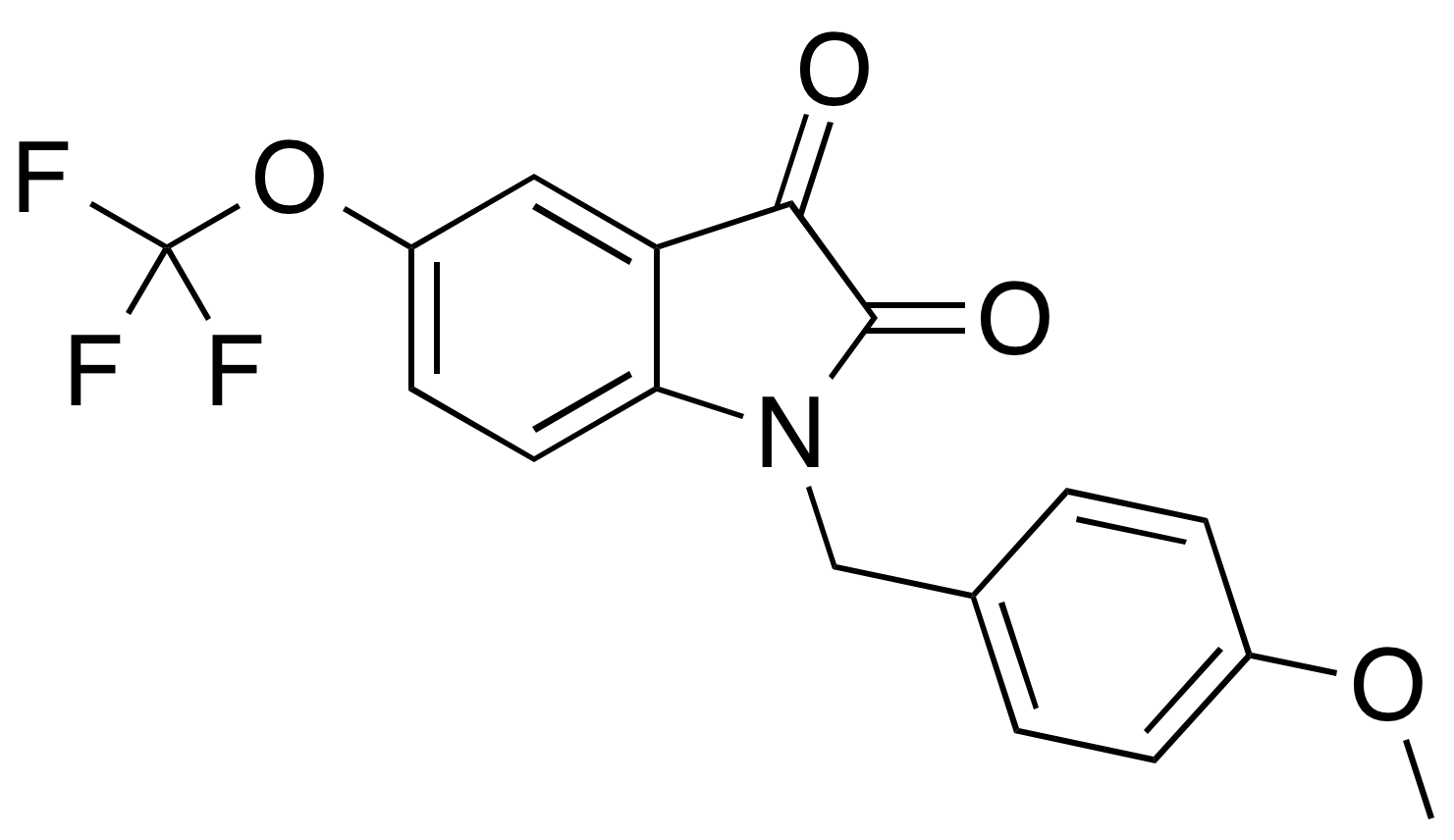

Identifiers
- IUPAC name: 1-(4-methoxybenzyl)-5-(trifluoromethoxy)indole-2,3-dione
- CAS Number: 1160247-92-6
- PubChem CID: 42633508
- ChemSpider: 24606034
- UNII: ZH1ZWF5Q3P
- ChEMBL: ChEMBL466253
- CompTox Dashboard (EPA): DTXSID40655290

Chemical and physical data
- Formula: C_{17}H_{12}F_{3}NO_{4}
- Molar mass: 351.281 g·mol^{−1}
- 3D model (JSmol): Interactive image; Interactive image
- SMILES: c2cc(OC)ccc2CN(C(=O)C1=O)c3ccc(cc13)OC(F)(F)F; COc1ccc(cc1)CN2c3ccc(cc3C(=O)C2=O)OC(F)(F)F
- InChI: InChI=1S/C17H12F3NO4/c1-24-11-4-2-10(3-5-11)9-21-14-7-6-12(25-17(18,19)20)8-13(14)15(22)16(21)23/h2-8H,9H2,1H3; Key:CKLGZXFOLMHCMC-UHFFFAOYSA-N

VU-0238429 is a drug which acts as a selective positive allosteric modulator for the muscarinic acetylcholine receptor M_{5}. It was the first selective ligand developed for the M_{5} subtype, and is structurally derived from older M_{1}-selective positive allosteric modulators such as VU-0119498. Replacing the O-methyl- by a phenyl group further improves the receptor subtype selectivity.
