= C21H32N2O =

The molecular formula C_{21}H_{32}N_{2}O (molar mass: 328.49 g/mol) may refer to:

- 77-LH-28-1
- Prodiame, or 17β-((3-aminopropyl)amino)estradiol
- Stanozolol
