= C25H25N3O2 =

The molecular formula C_{25}H_{25}N_{3}O_{2} may refer to:

- TC-G 1005
- MK-7622
