= C23H24N2O4 =

The molecular formula C_{23}H_{24}N_{2}O_{4} may refer to:

- 25N-NBPh
- PD-102,807
