= NBI-1076968 =

Muscarinic M4 receptor antagonist

Clinical data
- Other names: NBI1076968
- Routes of administration: Oral
- Drug class: Muscarinic acetylcholine M_{4} receptor antagonist

NBI-1076968 is a selective muscarinic acetylcholine M_{4} receptor antagonist which is under development by Neurocrine Biosciences for the treatment of movement disorders. It is orally active.

== Pharmacology ==
Along with the earlier drugs PD-0298029 and PD-102,807, NBI-1076968 is among the only selective M_{4} receptor antagonists to have been developed to date. However, in contrast to NBI-1076968, the earlier selective antagonists have not had optimal drug-like properties for development as pharmaceutical drugs.

== Clinical trials ==
As of September 2024, NBI-1076968 is in phase 1 clinical trials for treatment of movement disorders. The drug is under development by Neurocrine Biosciences. It was first described in 2024.
