= C18H15NO4 =

The molecular formula C_{18}H_{15}NO_{4} (molar mass: 469.31 g/mol) may refer to:

- BQCA
- Lunamarine
