= Tazomeline =

Chemical compound

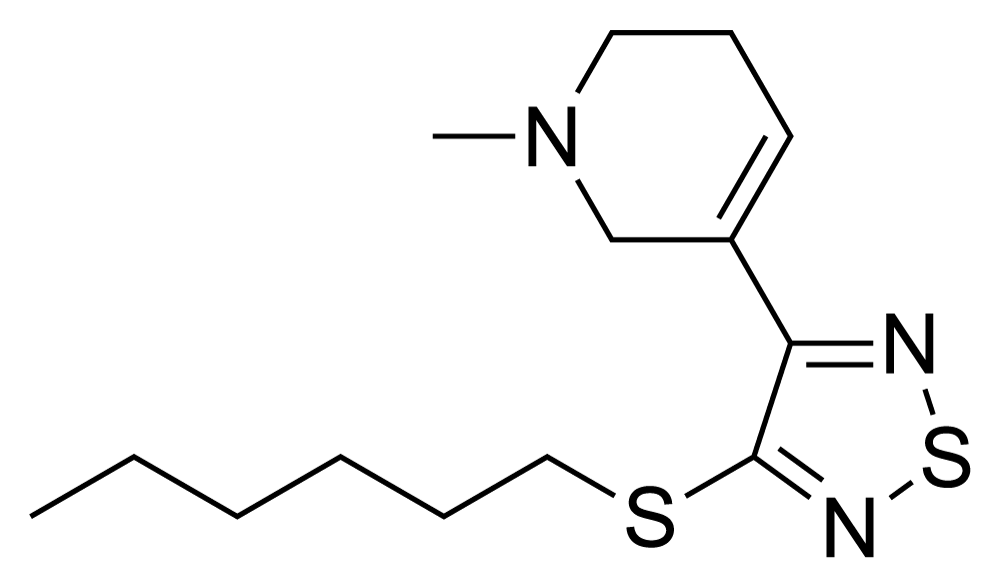

Clinical data
- Other names: LY-287,041; LY-287041; LY287041; 3-Hexylthio-TZTP
- ATC code: None

Identifiers
- IUPAC name: 5-[4-(hexylsulfanyl)-1,2,5-thiadiazol-3-yl]-1-methyl-1,2,3,6-tetrahydropyridine
- CAS Number: 131987-54-7
- PubChem CID: 131460
- ChemSpider: 116193
- UNII: QDP6S14W5W
- ChEMBL: ChEMBL131819
- CompTox Dashboard (EPA): DTXSID80157288

Chemical and physical data
- Formula: C_{14}H_{23}N_{3}S_{2}
- Molar mass: 297.48 g·mol^{−1}
- 3D model (JSmol): Interactive image
- SMILES: n2snc(/C1=C/CCN(C)C1)c2SCCCCCC

Tazomeline (LY-287,041) is a drug which acts as a non-selective muscarinic acetylcholine receptor agonist. It was in clinical trials for the treatment of cognitive dysfunction such as that seen in Alzheimer's disease and schizophrenia, but development was apparently scrapped for unknown reasons. Another of the patented uses is for the treatment of "severe painful conditions".

== See also ==
- Alvameline
- Milameline
- Sabcomeline
- Xanomeline
