= Direclidine =

Antipsychotic drug

Clinical data
- Other names: HTL-0016878; NBI-1117568; NBI-568
- Routes of administration: Oral
- Drug class: Muscarinic acetylcholine M_{4} receptor agonist

Identifiers
- IUPAC name: ethyl 2-[4-(2-methylpyrazol-3-yl)piperidin-1-yl]-6-azaspiro[3.4]octane-6-carboxylate
- CAS Number: 1803346-98-6
- PubChem CID: 118295270
- ChemSpider: 133319625
- UNII: TXB4V44U24
- KEGG: D13221

Chemical and physical data
- Formula: C_{19}H_{30}N_{4}O_{2}
- Molar mass: 346.475 g·mol^{−1}
- 3D model (JSmol): Interactive image
- SMILES: CCOC(=O)N1CCC2(C1)CC(C2)N3CCC(CC3)C4=CC=NN4C
- InChI: InChI=1S/C19H30N4O2/c1-3-25-18(24)23-11-7-19(14-23)12-16(13-19)22-9-5-15(6-10-22)17-4-8-20-21(17)2/h4,8,15-16H,3,5-7,9-14H2,1-2H3; Key:HEJAEKBVOZHTRA-UHFFFAOYSA-N

Direclidine (INN; developmental code names NBI-1117568, HTL-0016878) is an investigational antipsychotic drug for schizophrenia that was out-licensed from Nxera Pharma to Neurocrine Biosciences, a United States-based pharmaceutical company. It is an oral small molecule.

== Overview ==
It is a selective muscarinic acetylcholine M_{4} receptor agonist that indirectly modulates dopamine as the basis for its putative improvement of schizophrenia. In April 2016, the compound was out-licensed from Nxera Pharma to Allergan, an Irish pharmaceutical company, as part of Nxera's wider muscarinic agonist portfolio. By September 2017, it had advanced to Phase I clinical trial for the indication of "neuropsychiatric symptoms associated with Alzheimer's disease and other dementias" Following Allergan's acquisition by AbbVie, the license was returned to Nxera in January 2021. In November 2021, the compound was newly out-licensed to Neurocrine Biosciences, a U.S. pharmaceutical company. It has been under development as a treatment for schizophrenia, and is currently in Phase III clinical trials.

== History ==
- 2016
  - April: The rights to develop Nxera Pharma's muscarinic agonist portfolio, including NBI-1117568 were transferred to Allergan.
- 2017
  - September: Allergan initiated Phase I clinical trials for NBI-1117568 to treat "neurobehavioral symptoms related to Alzheimer's disease and other conditions."
- 2021
  - January: Allergan returned the rights to its muscarinic agonist portfolio, including, NBI-1117568 to Nxera Pharma.
  - November: The rights for the muscarinic agonist portfolio were then transferred to Neurocrine Biosciences, which took over the development of NBI-1117568.
- 2022
  - October: Phase II clinical trial of NBI-1117568 for the treatment of adults with schizophrenia was initiated.
- 2024
  - April: Neurocrine Biosciences announced that NBI-1117568 had met the requirements of long-term preclinical toxicity tests.
  - August: Neurocrine Biosciences released the results of the Phase II clinical trial.
- 2025
  - May: Neurocrine Biosciences initiated a Phase III registrational program for NBI-1117568 for the treatment of adults with schizophrenia.

== Clinical trials ==
=== Phase II clinical trial ===
The Phase II clinical trial was conducted in 15 sites across the U.S. with 200 adult patients diagnosed with schizophrenia. The primary endpoint was assessed by the change in the total score of the Positive and Negative Syndrome Scale (PANSS) after six weeks of treatment. The 20 mg once-daily group showed a statistically significant improvement of 7.5 points compared to the placebo group (improvement of 18.2 points from baseline, p = 0.011, effect size = 0.61). However, the 40 mg once-daily group, 60 mg once-daily group, and 30 mg twice-daily group did not show statistically significant differences compared to the placebo group (p-values: 40 mg group: 0.282, 60 mg group: 0.189, 30 mg twice-daily group: 0.090).

==== Market reaction to phase II clinical trial ====
With a PANSS improvement of 7.5, NBI-111758 lagged behind xanomeline/trospium (KarXT) (Karuna Therapeutics) with 8.4 and emraclidine (Cerevel Therapeutics) with 12.7, both of which were in clinical trials at the same time. Moreover, the lack of dose-dependency led to disappointment in the stock market. Neurocrine Biosciences' share price dropped 19% on the day following the announcement of the Phase II clinical trial results.

== See also ==
- List of investigational antipsychotics
- List of investigational bipolar disorder drugs
- Emraclidine
- ML-007
- NS-136
- Xanomeline/trospium
