= VU-0152100 =

Muscarinic acetylcholine receptor positive modulator selective for M4

Names
- IUPAC name 3-Amino-N-[(4-methoxyphenyl)methyl]-4,6-dimethylthieno[2,3-b]pyridine-2-carboxamide

Identifiers
CAS Number	409351-28-6
3D model (JSmol)	Interactive image
ChEMBL	ChEMBL1978713
ChemSpider	754902
ECHA InfoCard	100.209.922
EC Number	684-470-8
IUPHAR/BPS	3263
PubChem CID	864492
CompTox Dashboard (EPA)	DTXSID40357702
- InChI: InChI=1S/C18H19N3O2S/c1-10-8-11(2)21-18-14(10)15(19)16(24-18)17(22)20-9-12-4-6-13(23-3)7-5-12/h4-8H,9,19H2,1-3H3,(H,20,22) Key: MDNWGCQSCGNTKH-UHFFFAOYSA-N
- SMILES: CC1=CC(=NC2=C1C(=C(S2)C(=O)NCC3=CC=C(C=C3)OC)N)C

Properties
Chemical formula	C_{18}H_{19}N_{3}O_{2}S
Molar mass	341.43 g·mol^{−1}

Hazards
- GHS labelling
Pictograms	(GHS06: Toxic)
Signal word	Danger
Hazard statements	H301, H319
Precautionary statements	P264, P264+P265, P270, P280, P301+P316, P305+P351+P338, P321, P330, P337+P317, P405, P501
- Except where otherwise noted, data are given for materials in their standard state (at 25 °C [77 °F], 100 kPa). Infobox references

VU-0152100 is a positive modulator of the M4 receptor, one of the muscarinic acetylcholine receptors.

== Treatment of stimulant addiction ==
In mice, VU-0152100 is able to decrease self-administration of cocaine, this is thought to come from the M4 receptor's action on D1 containing dopaminergic neurons. It is also able to almost completely inhibit the hyperactivity caused by cocaine. Another study has shown that this drug is able to reverse hyperlocomotion induced by amphetamine, in an anti-psychotic-like manner. This data suggests that it could potentially be developed as a treatment for stimulant abuse.

== See also ==
- VU-0152099
