= GXV-813 =

Clinical data
- Other names: GXV813; EX-A8078; EXA8078
- Routes of administration: Oral
- Drug class: Muscarinic acetylcholine M_{4} receptor agonist

Identifiers
- IUPAC name: (7S)-7-[4-[5-fluoro-2-(2-oxaspiro[3.3]heptan-6-yloxy)phenyl]piperidin-1-yl]-2-(1,3,4-oxadiazol-2-yl)-5-oxa-2-azaspiro[3.4]octane
- CAS Number: 2640099-21-2
- PubChem CID: 156248515
- UNII: ZPB5JA37X4

Chemical and physical data
- Formula: C_{25}H_{31}FN_{4}O_{4}
- Molar mass: 470.545 g·mol^{−1}
- 3D model (JSmol): Interactive image
- SMILES: C1CN(CCC1C2=C(C=CC(=C2)F)OC3CC4(C3)COC4)[C@H]5CC6(CN(C6)C7=NN=CO7)OC5
- InChI: InChI=1S/C25H31FN4O4/c26-18-1-2-22(34-20-9-24(10-20)14-31-15-24)21(7-18)17-3-5-29(6-4-17)19-8-25(33-11-19)12-30(13-25)23-28-27-16-32-23/h1-2,7,16-17,19-20H,3-6,8-15H2/t19-/m0/s1; Key:ORGCUCREOUHRLJ-IBGZPJMESA-N

GXV-813, also known as EX-A8078, is a muscarinic acetylcholine M_{4} receptor agonist which is under development for the treatment of schizophrenia. It is taken orally. The drug is under development by Novartis. As of March 2026, it is in phase 2 clinical trials for schizophrenia. The drug also is or was under development for another unspecified indication, but no recent development for this use has been reported. Two phase 2 trials for schizophrenia are underway and expected to be completed in April 2027.

== See also ==
- List of investigational antipsychotics
