= Muscarinic acetylcholine receptor M5 =

Protein-coding gene in the species Homo sapiens

CHRM5

Identifiers
- Aliases: CHRM5, HM5, cholinergic receptor muscarinic 5
- External IDs: OMIM: 118496; MGI: 109248; GeneCards: CHRM5

Gene location (Human)
Chr.	Chromosome 15 (human)
Band	15q14	Start	33,968,497 bp
Band	15q14	End	34,067,458 bp

Gene location (Mouse)
Chr.	Chromosome 2 (mouse)
Band	2 E3|2 57.02 cM	Start	112,309,516 bp
Band	2 E3|2 57.02 cM	End	112,311,114 bp
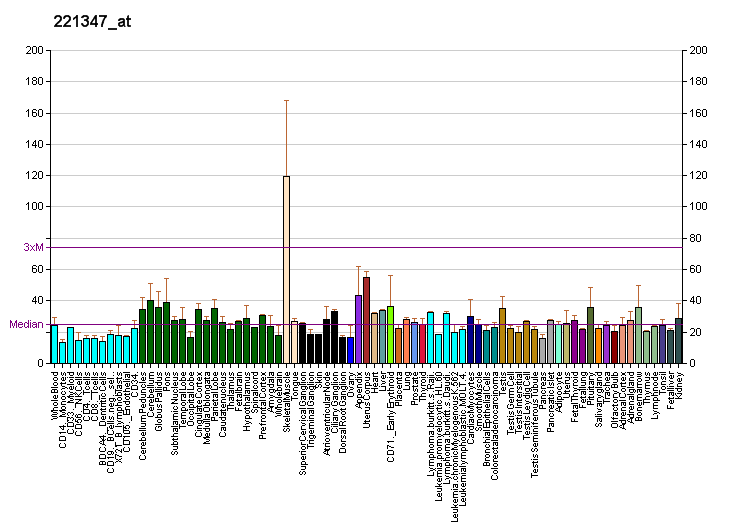
RNA expression pattern
Bgee	Human / Mouse (ortholog); Top expressed in: testicle; corpus callosum; C1 segment; gonad; substantia nigra; hypothalamus; inferior ganglion of vagus nerve; placenta; prefrontal cortex; right lobe of liver / Top expressed in: ventromedial nucleus; mammillary body; subiculum; ventral tegmental area; lateral hypothalamus; amygdala; anterior amygdaloid area; arcuate nucleus; dentate gyrus of hippocampal formation granule cell; hippocampus proper; More reference expression data
BioGPS	More reference expression data
Gene ontology
Molecular function	G protein-coupled receptor activity; signal transducer activity; phosphatidylinositol phospholipase C activity; G protein-coupled acetylcholine receptor activity; G protein-coupled serotonin receptor activity; neurotransmitter receptor activity
Cellular component	integral component of membrane; postsynaptic membrane; membrane; plasma membrane; synapse; integral component of plasma membrane; cell junction; dendrite
Biological process	G protein-coupled acetylcholine receptor signaling pathway; regulation of phosphatidylinositol dephosphorylation; gastric acid secretion; transmission of nerve impulse; synaptic transmission, cholinergic; adenylate cyclase-inhibiting G protein-coupled acetylcholine receptor signaling pathway; dopamine transport; phospholipase C-activating G protein-coupled acetylcholine receptor signaling pathway; cell population proliferation; signal transduction; G protein-coupled receptor signaling pathway; G protein-coupled receptor signaling pathway, coupled to cyclic nucleotide second messenger; chemical synaptic transmission; G protein-coupled serotonin receptor signaling pathway
Sources:Amigo / QuickGO
Orthologs
Databases	NCBI: entry; OMA: entry
Species	Human	Mouse
Entrez	1133	213788
Ensembl	ENSG00000184984	ENSMUSG00000074939
UniProt	P08912	Q920H4
RefSeq (mRNA)	NM_012125; NM_001320917	NM_205783
RefSeq (protein)	NP_001307846; NP_036257	NP_991352
Location (UCSC)	Chr 15: 33.97 – 34.07 Mb	Chr 2: 112.31 – 112.31 Mb
PubMed search
- Wikidata
View/Edit Human	View/Edit Mouse

The human muscarinic acetylcholine receptor M_{5}, encoded by the CHRM5 gene, is a member of the G protein-coupled receptor superfamily of integral membrane proteins. It is coupled to G_{q} protein. Binding of the endogenous ligand acetylcholine to the M_{5} receptor triggers a number of cellular responses such as adenylate cyclase inhibition, phosphoinositide degradation, and potassium channel modulation. Muscarinic receptors mediate many of the effects of acetylcholine in the central and peripheral nervous system. The clinical implications of this receptor have not been fully explored; however, stimulation of this receptor is known to effectively decrease cyclic AMP levels and downregulate the activity of protein kinase A (PKA).

== Ligands ==
No highly selective agonists or antagonists for the M_{5} receptor have been discovered as of 2018, but several non-selective muscarinic agonists and antagonists have significant affinity for M_{5}.

The lack of selective M5 receptor ligands is one of the main reasons that the medical community has such a limited understanding of the M5 receptors effects as the possibility that any and/or all effects of non-selective ligands may be due to interactions with other receptors can not be ruled out. Some data may be obtained by observing which effects are common among semi-selective ligands (ex. a ligand of M1 and M5, a ligand of M2 and M5, and a ligand of M3 and M5), but until both a selective agonist and a selective antagonist of the M5 receptor are developed this data must be considered merely theoretical.

=== Agonists ===
- Acetylcholine
- Bethanechol
- Methacholine
- Milameline ((E)-1,2,5,6-Tetrahydro-1-methyl-3-pyridinecarboxaldehyde-O-methyloxime, CAS# 139886-32-1)
- Pilocarpine

=== Positive allosteric modulators ===
- ML-380
- ML-326
- VU-0238429: EC_{50} = 1.16 μM; >30-fold selectivity versus M1 and M3, inactive at M2 and M4.

=== Negative allosteric modulators ===
- ML375
- VU6008667

=== Antagonists ===
- VU-0488130 (ML381)
- VU6036864
- Xanomeline
- Diphenhydramine
- Doxylamine

== See also ==
- Muscarinic acetylcholine receptor
