= Neurocrine Biosciences =

American biopharmaceutical company

Neurocrine Biosciences, Inc.
- Type: Public
- Traded as: Nasdaq: NBIX; S&P 400 component
- Industry: Biotechnology
- Founded: in 1992 by Larry Bock, Wylie Vale, Larry Steinman, Kevin Gorman
- Headquarters: San Diego, California, U.S.
- Key people: William Rastetter (chairman); Kyle Gano (CEO)
- Revenue: ▲US$2.86 billion (2025)
- Number of employees: 1,350 (June 30, 2023)
- Website: neurocrine.com

Neurocrine Biosciences, Inc. is an American biopharmaceutical company founded in 1992. It is headquartered in San Diego, California, and led by CEO Kyle Gano as of October 11, 2024. Neurocrine develops treatments for neurological and endocrine-related diseases and disorders. In 2017, the company's drug valbenazine (Ingrezza) was approved in the US to treat adults with tardive dyskinesia (TD).

The company is also developing treatments that are in various stages of clinical research for Parkinson's disease, Tourette syndrome, and congenital adrenal hyperplasia and with a partner for endometriosis and uterine fibroids.

== History ==
Previous logo

Neurocrine was founded in San Diego, California, in 1992. The company's academic founders were Wylie Vale of the Salk Institute for Biological Studies, and Lawrence Steinman of Stanford University. The company was backed and organized by Larry Bock of Avalon Ventures among others.

In 1995, the company collaborated with Belgium-based Janssen Pharmaceutica N.V. to develop treatments for psychiatric disorders utilizing corticotropin releasing factor (CRF) antagonists, a class of compounds to treat psychiatric, neurological and gastrointestinal diseases including anxiety, depression and irritable bowel syndrome. The company underwent an IPO in May 1996, listing on the NASDAQ exchange under the symbol NBIX and raising $34.2 million.

In October 1996, Eli Lilly and Company agreed to pay Neurocrine $74 million over five years to develop drugs for obesity and Alzheimer's disease based on its research of CRF-binding protein-ligand inhibitors.

In July 2001, Neurocrine and GlaxoSmithKline entered into a worldwide research, development and commercialization agreement, including a collaborative research program for up to five years to identify and develop CRF-R antagonist compounds. The collaboration also included worldwide development and commercialization of NBI-34041 as well as potential backup candidates resulting from the research program. Neurocrine received upfront fees and early milestone payments totaling $25.5 million.

In December 2002, Neurocrine reached an agreement with Pfizer for the rights to its experimental insomnia drug, indiplon. The deal paid Neurocrine $100 million initially with a possible $300 million more if the drug met regulatory and sales goals. In May 2006, the FDA issued a non-approvable letter for a modified-release 15 mg formulation of indiplon and an approvable letter with stipulations for 5 mg and 10 mg immediate-release formulations. As a result, Pfizer terminated its agreement with Neurocrine. Following a resubmission of the 5 mg and 10 mg formulations in December 2007, Neurocrine's new drug application was deemed 'approvable' but the FDA requested additional studies. The company discontinued development of the drug in the United States. In 2007, Neurocrine partnered with Dainippon Sumitomo Pharma to develop and commercialize indiplon in Japan. The deal paid Neurocrine $20 million up front with the ability to receive milestone payments and royalties based on the commercialization of indiplon in Japan.

Kevin Gorman replaced Gary Lyons as CEO of the company in January 2008. Lyons was CEO and president of the company since its founding and maintained a role on the company's board of directors.

On June 16, 2010, Neurocrine agreed to a deal with AbbVie Inc. (previously Abbott Laboratories) worth up to $575 million with Neurocrine granting AbbVie the worldwide rights to develop and commercialize elagolix, an oral gonadotropin-releasing hormone (GnRH) antagonist to treat endometriosis and uterine fibroids. The deal paid Neurocrine $75 million up front.

In April 2017, the FDA approved valbenazine for the treatment of TD. At the time of approval, it was the first and only drug approved for adults with TD. Neurocrine is also studying valbenazine in clinical trials for the treatment of Tourette Syndrome. In October 2017, Neurocrine announced that it had been granted orphan drug designation status from the FDA for valbenazine for the treatment of pediatric patients with Tourette syndrome.

In February 2017, Neurocrine announced an exclusive licensing agreement for the development and commercialization of the Parkinson's disease drug, opicapone, in North America with the Portugal-based pharmaceutical company Bial. As part of the agreement, Neurocrine provided an upfront payment of $30 million and agreed to fund development activities for FDA approval in the United States. Bial is eligible to receive additional milestone payments of up to $115 million and a percentage of net sales.

In September 2017, AbbVie submitted a NDA to the FDA for elagolix for the management of endometriosis and associated pain. The submission was supported by two similar Phase 3 clinical studies involving 1,700 women. In October 2017, AbbVie and Neurocrine announced that the FDA granted priority review for the elagolix NDA. A final regulatory decision on the drug will come during the third quarter of 2018. The companies are also developing elagolix for the treatment of uterine fibroids which is in Phase III development.

In 2021,Nexera Pharmain Japan licensed out its investigational schizophrenia drug, NBI-1117568, to Neurocrine Biosciences for development.

In August 2024, Neurocrine announced the results of a Phase II clinical trial of NBI-1117568 . The drug demonstrated a 7.5-point improvement in the Positive and Negative Syndrome Scale (PANSS), which was lower than the 8.4-point improvement seen with KarXT (developed by Karuna Therapeutics) and the 12.7-point improvement seen with Emraclidine (developed by Cerevel Therapeutics), both of which were also in clinical trials at the time. Additionally, the study found no dose-dependent response to NBI-1117568. As a result, Neurocrine's stock price fell 19% the following day as investors were disappointed by the results.

== Product pipeline ==
- Elagolix – gonadotropin-releasing hormone receptor antagonist undergoing FDA review for the treatment of endometriosis and in clinical trials for uterine fibroids
- Opicapone – A once daily catechol-O-methyl transferase inhibitor in trials for Parkinson's disease
- NBI-74788 – Corticotropin-releasing factor (CRF) receptor antagonist
- NBI-1117568 - A drug that stimulates muscarinic receptors and is used to treat schizophrenia.
