= NS-136 =

Experimental muscarinic drug

Clinical data
- Other names: NS136
- Routes of administration: Oral
- Drug class: Muscarinic acetylcholine M_{4} receptor positive allosteric modulator

NS-136 is a selective muscarinic acetylcholine M_{4} receptor positive allosteric modulator which is under development for the treatment of schizophrenia and Alzheimer's disease. It has been found to possess pro-cognitive effects in rodents. The drug is under development by NeuShen Therapeutics. As of May 2024, it is in phase 1 clinical trials for schizophrenia and is in the preclinical stage of development for Alzheimer's disease. Phase 2 trials to determine efficacy of NS-136 in treating schizophrenia began in October of 2025, with the expected completion date of the study being December of 2026. The drug is a small molecule, but its chemical structure does not seem to have been disclosed.

== See also ==
- List of investigational antipsychotics
- Emraclidine
- NBI-1117568
- Xanomeline
