= PIPE-359 =

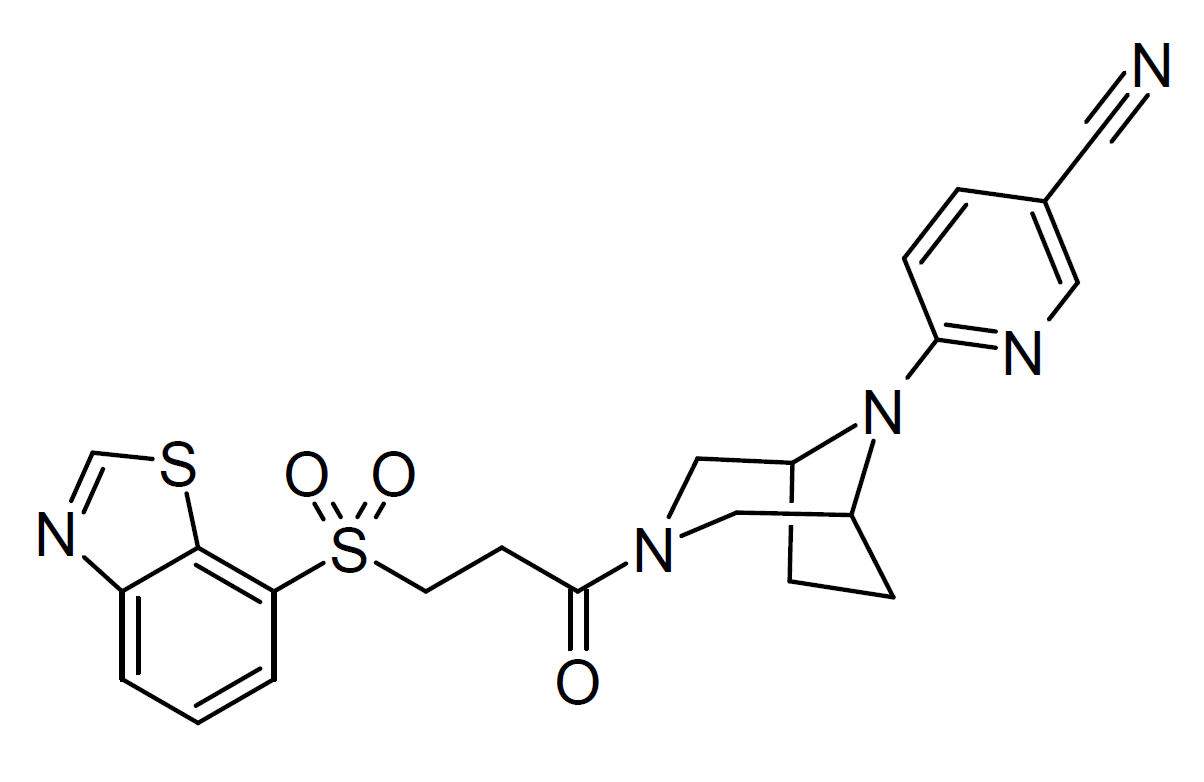

Identifiers
- IUPAC name: 6-[3-[3-(1,3-benzothiazol-7-ylsulfonyl)propanoyl]-3,8-diazabicyclo[3.2.1]octan-8-yl]pyridine-3-carbonitrile
- CAS Number: 2401785-66-6
- PubChem CID: 152278786
- ChemSpider: 129483116
- ChEMBL: ChEMBL4790083

Chemical and physical data
- Formula: C_{22}H_{21}N_{5}O_{3}S_{2}
- Molar mass: 467.56 g·mol^{−1}
- 3D model (JSmol): Interactive image
- SMILES: C1CC2CN(CC1N2C3=NC=C(C=C3)C#N)C(=O)CCS(=O)(=O)C4=CC=CC5=C4SC=N5
- InChI: InChI=1S/C22H21N5O3S2/c23-10-15-4-7-20(24-11-15)27-16-5-6-17(27)13-26(12-16)21(28)8-9-32(29,30)19-3-1-2-18-22(19)31-14-25-18/h1-4,7,11,14,16-17H,5-6,8-9,12-13H2; Key:WKWYANDGYZVVAK-UHFFFAOYSA-N

PIPE-359 is an experimental drug that acts as a potent and selective antagonist of the muscarinic acetylcholine receptor M1. It has been investigated for potential application in the remyelination of nerve sheaths
