= PD-0298029 =

Chemical compound

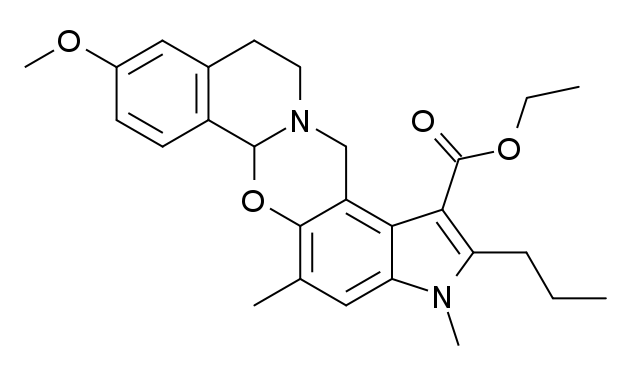

Identifiers
- IUPAC name: ethyl 3,6a,11,14-tetrahydro-9-methoxy-2-propyl-3,5-dimethyl-(12H)-isoquino[1,2-b]pyrrolo[3,2-f][1,3]benzoxazine-1-carboxylate
- CAS Number: 2178941-12-1
- PubChem CID: 60210050
- ChemSpider: 26233369
- UNII: 2A5XS99U8Q
- CompTox Dashboard (EPA): DTXSID701029771

Chemical and physical data
- Formula: C_{27}H_{32}N_{2}O_{4}
- Molar mass: 448.563 g·mol^{−1}
- 3D model (JSmol): Interactive image; Interactive image
- SMILES: CCCc1c(c2c(n1C)cc(c3c2CN4CCc5cc(ccc5C4O3)OC)C)C(=O)OCC; CCCc1n(C)c5cc(C)c3OC4c2ccc(OC)cc2CCN4Cc3c5c1C(=O)OCC
- InChI: InChI=1S/C27H32N2O4/c1-6-8-21-24(27(30)32-7-2)23-20-15-29-12-11-17-14-18(31-5)9-10-19(17)26(29)33-25(20)16(3)13-22(23)28(21)4/h9-10,13-14,26H,6-8,11-12,15H2,1-5H3; Key:MTMZSGQXRVRKSY-UHFFFAOYSA-N

PD-0298029 is a drug which acts as a selective antagonist for the muscarinic acetylcholine receptor M_{4}. It was developed for the treatment of Parkinson's disease, but poor bioavailability and rapid metabolism in animal studies have meant its use is largely limited to in vitro research into the M_{4} and other muscarinic receptors.

== See also ==
- PD-102,807
- NBI-1076968
