= Roger Guillemin =

French-American neuroscientist (1924–2024)

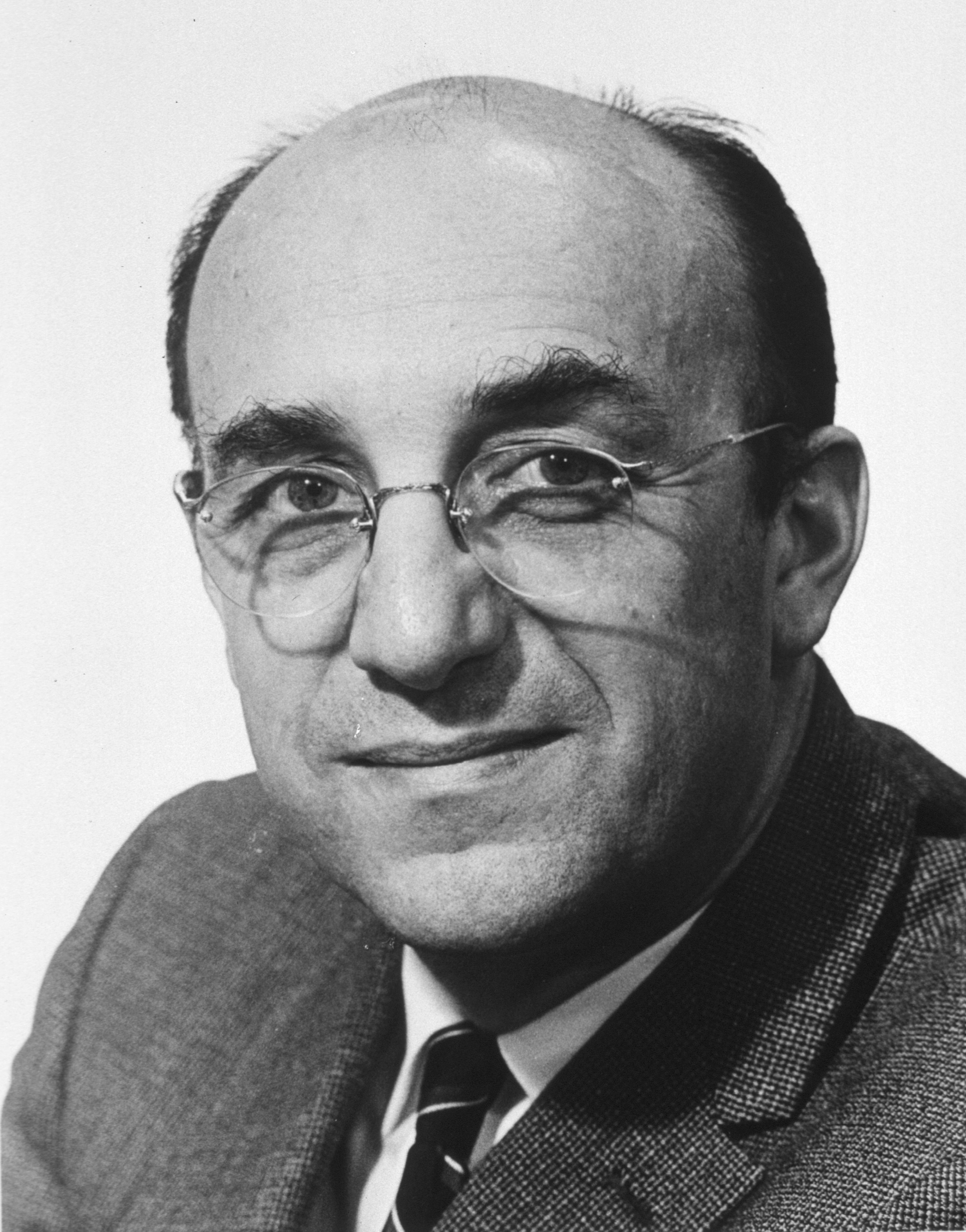
- Born: Roger Charles Louis Guillemin; January 11, 1924; Dijon, France
- Died: February 21, 2024 (aged 100); San Diego, California, U.S.
- Citizenship: United States
- Education: Université de Lyon; Université de Montréal
- Known for: Neurohormones
- Spouse: Lucienne Guillemin (died 2021)
- Children: 6
- Awards: National Medal of Science, Nobel Prize (1977); Dickson Prize (1977)
- Scientific career
- Fields: Biology; Neurology
- Workplaces: Baylor College of Medicine; University of California, San Diego
- Doctoral students: Wylie Vale

Roger Charles Louis Guillemin (French pronunciation: [ʁɔʒe ʃaʁl lwi ɡijmɛ̃]; January 11, 1924 – February 21, 2024) was a French-American neuroscientist. He received the National Medal of Science in 1976, and the Nobel Prize for Medicine in 1977 for his work on neurohormones, sharing the prize that year with Andrew Schally and Rosalyn Sussman Yalow.

== Biography ==
Guillemin was born in Dijon, France. After secondary studies at the Lycée Carnot in Dijon, he began his medical studies at the University of Dijon in 1943. He completed his medical studies at the University of Lyon and received MD degree in 1949. He worked as a doctor in a small village in Burgundy, and went to Montreal, Quebec, Canada, to work with Hans Selye at the Institute of Experimental Medicine and Surgery at the Université de Montréal where he received a Ph.D. in 1953. In 1965, he became a naturalized citizen of the United States.

In 1954, Guillemin observed that pituitary cells do not produce hormones unless hypothalamic cells are present, which supported the theory that the hypothalamus controls the pituitary through hormones, dubbed releasing factors. Guillemin moved to Baylor College of Medicine, in Houston, to develop that finding. Andrzej V. Schally, known in the US as Andrew Schally, joined him in 1957. Their partnership dissolved after five years for lack of progress and personal conflicts; Schally moved to the Veterans Affairs Hospital in New Orleans.

Both scientists then worked independently, processing large quantities of hypothalami: Guillemin used over two million sheep hypothalami, and Schally used pig brains—funded by the US government. The release factors are present in an extremely low amounts in the hypothalamus, and it was hard to detect them using the instrumentation available at that time. Their rivalry intensified, particularly regarding scientific credit. In 1969, as government funding was about to be cut off, Roger Burgus from Guillemin's team made a breakthrough by identifying the thyrotropin-releasing factor (TRF), which controls the thyroid gland. The achievement secured continued funding and led to the identification of another releasing factor, FRF, which controls reproductive systems. Guillemin and Schally discovered the structures of Thyrotropin-releasing hormone (TRH) and Gonadotropin-releasing hormone (GnRH) in separate laboratories. They were awarded the 1977 Nobel Prize in Physiology or Medicine for this discovery.

In 1970, he joined the Salk Institute in La Jolla, where he was the head of the Laboratories for Neuroendocrinology until his retirement in 1989. Here, he discovered somatostatin, and was "among the first" to isolate endorphins. A Guillemin protégé, Wylie Vale Jr., established his own laboratory at Salk in 1977; their attempts of finding releasing factors was described as "yet another furious rivalry." Vale's lab was first to purify and sequence the CRF.

In 2007, Guillemin was an interim president of the Salk Institute.

Guillemin signed, along with other Nobel Prize winners, a petition requesting a delegation of the Committee on the Rights of the Child of the United Nations to visit a Tibetan child who had been under house arrest in China since 1995, namely Gedhun Choekyi Nyima, who was recognized as the 11th Panchen Lama by the 14th Dalai Lama, Tenzin Gyatso.

Guillemin turned 100 on January 11, 2024, and died in San Diego, California the following month, on February 21.

He was married to Lucienne Jeanne Billard for 69 years until her death in 2021, at the age of 100. They had five daughters and a son.

== Awards and honors ==
- National Academy of Sciences, 1974
- Canada Gairdner International Award, 1974
- Albert Lasker Award for Basic Medical Research, 1975
- Dickson Prize in Medicine, 1976
- Passano Award in Medical Sciences, 1976
- National Medal of Science, 1976
- American Academy of Arts and Sciences, 1977
- Nobel Prize in Physiology or Medicine, 1977
