= Muscarinic agonist =

Activator of the muscarinic acetylcholine receptor

- Drug class
- Skeletal structure formula of muscarine

Class identifiers
- Synonyms: Muscarinic acetylcholine receptor agonist; Muscarinic receptor agonist; Muscarinic; Muscarinic drug; Muscarinic agent; Muscarinic medication; mACh agonist; mAChR agonist
- ATC code: N07
- Biological target: muscarinic acetylcholine receptor

External links
- MeSH: D018721

Legal status

A muscarinic acetylcholine receptor agonist, also known as a muscarinic agonist or as a muscarinic agent, is an agent that activates the muscarinic acetylcholine receptor. The muscarinic receptor has different subtypes, labelled M1-M5, allowing further differentiation.

== Clinical significance ==
=== M1 ===
M1-type muscarinic acetylcholine receptors play a role in cognitive processing. In Alzheimer's disease (AD), amyloid formation may decrease the ability of these receptors to transmit signals, leading to decreased cholinergic activity. As these receptors themselves appear relatively unchanged in the disease process, they have become a potential therapeutic target when trying to improve cognitive function in patients with AD.

A number of muscarinic agonists have been developed and are under investigation to treat AD. These agents show promise as they are neurotrophic, decrease amyloid depositions, and improve damage due to oxidative stress. Tau-phosphorylation is decreased and cholinergic function enhanced. Notably several agents of the AF series of muscarinic agonists have become the focus of such research:. AF102B, AF150(S), AF267B. In animal models that are mimicking the damage of AD, these agents appear promising.

The dual M1, M4 agonist xanomeline has been proposed as a potential treatment for schizophrenia. Xanomeline/trospium chloride was approved in the US in 2024. Based on preclinical pharmacological and genetic studies, M1 predominantly modulates cognitive symptom domains and modestly regulates psychosis symptom domains.

=== M3 ===
In the form of pilocarpine, muscarinic receptor agonists have been used medically for a short time.

- M3 agonists
  - Aceclidine, for glaucoma
  - Arecoline, an alkaloid present in the Betel nut
  - Pilocarpine, a drug that acts as a muscarinic receptor agonist that is used to treat glaucoma
  - Cevimeline (AF102B, Evoxac), a muscarinic agonist that is a Food and Drug Administration-approved drug and used for the management of dry mouth in Sjögren's syndrome

=== M4 ===
Xanomeline exerts its action partially through the M4 receptor. Based on preclinical pharmacological and genetic studies, M4 receptors appear to modulate both psychosis and cognitive symptom domains.

== Muscarinic versus nicotinic activity ==
Comparison of cholinergic agonists
Substance	Receptor specificity		Hydrolysis by AChE	Comments
Substance	Muscarinic	Nicotinic	Hydrolysis by AChE	Comments
Acetylcholine	High	High	High	Endogenous ligand.
Carbachol	Moderate	High	None	Used in the treatment of glaucoma.
Methacholine	High	Low	Moderate	Used to diagnose bronchial hyperreactivity, a hallmark of asthma and COPD.
Bethanechol	High	None	None	Used in bladder and gastrointestinal hypotonia.
Muscarine	High	None	None	Natural alkaloid found in certain mushrooms. Cause of one form of mushroom poisoning.
Nicotine	None	High	None	Natural alkaloid found in the tobacco plant.
Pilocarpine	Moderate	None	None	Used in glaucoma.
Oxotremorine	Moderate	Low	None	Used in research to induce symptoms of Parkinson's disease.

== Muscarinic acetylcholine receptor subtypes ==
The targets for muscarinic agonists are the muscarinic receptors: M_{1}, M_{2}, M_{3}, M_{4} and M_{5}. These receptors are GPCRs coupled to either Gi or Gq subunits.

== See also ==
- Muscarine
- Muscarinic acetylcholine receptor
- Muscarinic antagonist
- Nicotinic acetylcholine receptor
- Nicotinic agonist
- Nicotinic antagonist
