= Lawrence Steinman =

Immunologist and neurologist, professor of pediatrics

- Born: Los Angeles, California
- Occupations: Neurologist, neuroimmunologist and academic

Academic background
- Education: Bachelor of Arts in Physics; Doctor of Medicine
- Alma mater: Dartmouth College; Harvard Medical School

Academic work
- Institutions: Stanford University

Lawrence Steinman (born 1947) is an American neurologist, neuroimmunologist and academic. He is the George A. Zimmermann Professor at Stanford University, where he is a professor of neurology and neurological sciences and of pediatrics and, by courtesy, of genetics. Steinman's research has focused on how the immune system attacks the brain, specifically in multiple sclerosis (MS), and he has also worked on amyotrophic lateral sclerosis (ALS), neuromyelitis optica and type 1 diabetes. In 1992 his laboratory, working with scientists at Athena Neurosciences, showed that α4 integrin is needed for immune cells to enter the inflamed brain, a finding that led to natalizumab (Tysabri), the first monoclonal antibody approved for MS. In 2022 he was a senior author of a study that described molecular mimicry between the Epstein–Barr virus (EBV) protein EBNA1 and the brain protein GlialCAM, offering a mechanism for how EBV infection may trigger MS. He was also the lead author of the report on the phase 3 trials of ublituximab, which the U.S. Food and Drug Administration approved for relapsing MS in 2022.

Steinman was elected to the Institute of Medicine (now the National Academy of Medicine) in 2009 and to the National Academy of Sciences in 2015. His honors include the John Dystel Prize (2004), the Charcot Award of the Multiple Sclerosis International Federation (2011) and the Anthony Cerami Award in Translational Medicine (2016), and he twice received the Senator Jacob Javits Neuroscience Investigator Award from the National Institute of Neurological Disorders and Stroke.

== Early life and education ==
Steinman was born in Los Angeles in 1947 and grew up in Culver City, California. His father, Norman Steinman, served as an infantry rifleman in the Philippines during World War II and afterwards trained as a pharmacist; his mother, Anne, was an early-childhood teacher. He was one of four children. As a teenager he worked weekends at his father's pharmacy in Culver City, which he has suggested gave him an early grounding in pharmaceuticals and influenced his later interest in developing drugs through small companies. In 1951 his older sister contracted poliomyelitis; Steinman later wrote that the episode showed him that the brain is not fully protected from the immune system, an idea that shaped his later research.

After the launch of Sputnik, increased U.S. investment in science education gave Steinman opportunities in mathematics; while still in high school he took mathematics classes at UCLA, attended a National Science Foundation summer mathematics institute at Oregon State University in 1962, and published his first paper, on a mathematical theory. He entered Dartmouth College in 1964, majored in physics and graduated with an A.B. in 1968. In the summer of 1967 he worked at the Salk Institute in the laboratory of the physicist Edwin Lennox, studying the genetic control of the immune response to influenza—his first exposure to immunology.

Steinman entered Harvard Medical School in 1968 and received his M.D. in 1973. At Harvard he spent a research year in the neurobiology laboratory of Torsten Wiesel before turning to immunology. After an internship at Stanford, completed in 1974, and a brief fellowship in neurosurgery there, he was a postdoctoral fellow in chemical immunology at the Weizmann Institute of Science in Israel, completing the fellowship in 1977. Working in the laboratory of Michael Sela, he studied how the immune system becomes sensitized to myelin basic protein in experimental autoimmune encephalomyelitis (EAE), an animal model of MS, and found that the disease developed only when macrophages took up and presented the protein.

== Career ==
Steinman returned to Stanford as a resident in pediatric and adult neurology, completed his neurology residency in 1980 and joined the faculty that year. He was certified in neurology by the American Board of Psychiatry and Neurology in 1984. He has directed the Laboratory of Neuroimmunology and attends on the inpatient service at Lucile Packard Children's Hospital. In 2008 he was appointed the George A. Zimmermann Professor. He chaired Stanford's Interdepartmental Program in Immunology from 2002 to 2011, and is a member of Stanford Bio-X and the Wu Tsai Neurosciences Institute. He is a member editor of the Proceedings of the National Academy of Sciences.

Since 2015 Steinman has been a member of the Institute of Medicine advisory committee on multiple sclerosis and other neurologic disorders in veterans of the Persian Gulf and post-9/11 wars, and from 2018 to 2022 he chaired the U.S. Department of Veterans Affairs Research Advisory Committee on Gulf War Veterans' Illnesses.

In the biotechnology industry, Steinman co-founded Neurocrine Biosciences with Wylie Vale of the Salk Institute in 1992. He also co-founded Bayhill Therapeutics (later renamed Tolerion), Nuon Therapeutics, Transparency Life Sciences, Atreca and Pasithea Therapeutics, where he is executive chairman. He was an adviser to Centocor from 1987 to 1989 and later a member of its board of directors. By 2016 he held 45 patents, including patents on therapies for MS, Huntington's disease and type 1 diabetes.

== Research ==
Steinman's research concerns the pathogenesis of multiple sclerosis and related neuroinflammatory diseases, and the development of antigen-specific tolerance therapies for autoimmune diseases in which the target antigen is known, particularly type 1 diabetes and neuromyelitis optica. His laboratory also studies diseases in which amyloid structures are central, including Huntington's disease and Alzheimer's disease. It also developed a microarray technology for detecting autoantibodies to myelin proteins and lipids.

=== Immune cell entry into the brain and natalizumab ===
In the 1980s Steinman worked with Hugh McDevitt on antibodies against major histocompatibility complex molecules, and with Leonard and Lenore Herzenberg on antibodies to immune proteins, both of which blocked EAE; one of the first therapeutic antibodies he developed was directed against CD4. In the late 1980s he collaborated with Ted Yednock of Athena Neurosciences. Steinman's laboratory and Yednock's group published the 1992 Nature paper showing that antibodies against α4β1 integrin stopped white blood cells from binding to inflamed brain blood vessels and prevented EAE. The National Academy of Sciences cited this work, and Steinman's later role in designing trials of α4 integrin blockade, in his election citation, and the American Association for the Advancement of Science cited his discoveries on lymphocyte homing to the brain when electing him a fellow in 2016.

The humanized antibody natalizumab (Tysabri) was approved by the U.S. Food and Drug Administration in November 2004. It was withdrawn by its manufacturer in February 2005 after three patients in clinical trials developed progressive multifocal leukoencephalopathy (PML), a viral brain infection, and returned to the market in June 2006 under a restricted prescribing program. Steinman, who did not take part in the drug's commercial development, had warned for more than a decade that drugs blocking immune-cell entry into the brain might carry a risk of infection. In 2006, while the FDA was considering the drug's return, he and his Stanford colleague Annette Langer-Gould argued that it should be reserved for patients likely to suffer severe disability who had no other options. Patients are now tested for antibodies to the JC virus, which causes PML, before treatment. Natalizumab is also used to treat Crohn's disease.

=== Molecular analysis of MS lesions ===
Using gene microarrays on autopsy brain tissue, Steinman's group identified differences in gene expression between acute and inactive MS lesions, including increased transcripts for the inflammatory cytokines interleukin-6, interleukin-17 and interferon-γ; two of the resulting targets, G-CSF and the Fc receptor γ chain, were validated in EAE. He extended this work to proteins and lipids involved in acute and chronic disease. A 2008 proteomic study of lesions isolated by laser-capture microdissection found coagulation proteins, including tissue factor and protein C inhibitor, in chronic active plaques, and showed that the anticoagulants hirudin and activated protein C reduced disease in mice. Studies with lipid microarrays identified antibodies against sulfatide, sphingomyelin and oxidized lipids in the cerebrospinal fluid of people with MS, and later work identified naturally occurring fatty acids and phospholipids of the myelin sheath that suppress neuroinflammation.

These studies identified what Steinman called molecular "guardians" that protect the MS brain from injury, among them αB-crystallin, a prevalent transcript in MS lesions with potential as a therapeutic target. His group also found that T-cell receptor genes in MS brain lesions use a limited set of variable regions, and that many share sequence motifs with T cells that recognize a peptide of myelin basic protein. He was a co-author of a study, led by Shannon Dunn, that linked sex differences in T-cell cytokine production to the peroxisome proliferator-activated receptors PPARα and PPARγ, which may help explain why autoimmune diseases are more common in women.

=== Amyloid and immune suppression ===
Steinman's group found several amyloid-forming proteins, including tau, αB-crystallin and the precursor of β-amyloid, in MS lesions. Contrary to his expectation, amyloid given intravenously to mice with EAE reduced paralysis, and with the biochemist Jonathan Rothbard he showed that short synthetic amyloid-forming hexapeptides had the same effect. In his 2015 inaugural article as a member of the National Academy of Sciences, he and his colleagues reported that amyloid fibrils injected into the abdomen activated B-1a lymphocytes, a type of regulatory B cell, and macrophages that secrete interleukin-10, reducing paralysis; the fibrils also worked when given through the nose. Later work linked amyloid fibrils, small heat shock proteins and nicotine to a common immune-suppressive pathway.

=== Antigen-specific tolerance ===
Steinman developed DNA vaccines intended to switch off the immune response to a single self-antigen. His work led to several clinical trials. In a phase 2 trial in relapsing–remitting MS, a DNA plasmid encoding myelin basic protein (BHT-3009) reduced new enhancing brain lesions by about half at the lower dose compared with placebo, although the primary endpoint narrowly missed statistical significance; the higher dose was ineffective. A related plasmid encoding proinsulin (BHT-3021) was tested in 80 adults with type 1 diabetes in a trial sponsored by Bayhill Therapeutics; it reduced proinsulin-specific CD8+ T cells and preserved C-peptide during dosing, with no serious related adverse events.

=== Molecular mimicry and Epstein–Barr virus ===
In 2022 Steinman and William Robinson were the senior authors of a Nature study that traced clonally expanded B cells in the cerebrospinal fluid of people with MS and found antibodies that bind both the EBV protein EBNA1 and the central nervous system protein GlialCAM. Immunization with EBNA1 worsened the mouse model of MS, and antibodies against both proteins were common in people with MS—about 20 to 25 percent of the patients studied had antibodies that bound tightly to both. The same month, he and Robinson wrote a Science perspective arguing, alongside a large epidemiological study by Alberto Ascherio's group, that EBV is the trigger for most cases of MS. The work was cited when he received the 2023 Pioneer in Medicine Award, and Pasithea Therapeutics began developing a DNA plasmid vaccine designed to induce tolerance to GlialCAM.

He has since written on how these findings might be translated into treatments, including therapies that target EBV, and on other regions of EBNA1 that mimic human proteins, such as αB-crystallin and anoctamin-2.

=== B-cell therapy and other diseases ===
Steinman was the lead author of the report on ULTIMATE I and II, two phase 3 trials comparing the glycoengineered anti-CD20 antibody ublituximab with teriflunomide in 1,094 people with relapsing MS in 10 countries. Ublituximab lowered the annualized relapse rate by 59% in ULTIMATE I and 49% in ULTIMATE II, and the FDA approved it as Briumvi in December 2022. Outside MS, he co-led a 2023 study, carried out with Pasithea Therapeutics, that identified elevated α5 integrin on myeloid cells in motor areas of the brain in ALS as a possible therapeutic target, and in 2026 he was a co-author of a study reporting cytotoxic T cells that recognize α-synuclein in multiple system atrophy.

== Awards and honors ==
- 1979 – S. Weir Mitchell Award, American Academy of Neurology
- 1988–2002 – Senator Jacob Javits Neuroscience Investigator Award (twice), National Institute of Neurological Disorders and Stroke
- 1994 – Friedrich Sasse Prize, Free University of Berlin
- 2004 – John Dystel Prize for Multiple Sclerosis Research, American Academy of Neurology and National Multiple Sclerosis Society
- 2008 – Honorary doctorate, Hasselt University
- 2009 – Elected to the Institute of Medicine (now the National Academy of Medicine)
- 2011 – Charcot Award for lifetime achievement in MS research, Multiple Sclerosis International Federation; he gave the Charcot Lecture at the ECTRIMS meeting in Amsterdam
- 2015 – Elected to the National Academy of Sciences
- 2016 – Anthony Cerami Award in Translational Medicine (fifth recipient), Feinstein Institute for Medical Research and Molecular Medicine
- 2016 – Fellow, American Association for the Advancement of Science
- 2022 – Honorary doctorate (doctor honoris causa), University of Buenos Aires
- 2023 – Pioneer in Medicine Award, Society for Brain Mapping and Therapeutics and World Brain Mapping Foundation

== Selected publications ==
- Yednock, T. A.; Cannon, C.; Fritz, L. C.; Sanchez-Madrid, F.; Steinman, L.; Karin, N. (1992). "Prevention of experimental autoimmune encephalomyelitis by antibodies against α4β1 integrin." Nature. 356 (6364): 63–66.
- Lock, C.; et al. (2002). "Gene-microarray analysis of multiple sclerosis lesions yields new targets validated in autoimmune encephalomyelitis." Nature Medicine. 8 (5): 500–508.
- Feldmann, M.; Steinman, L. (2005). "Design of effective immunotherapy for human autoimmunity." Nature. 435 (7042): 612–619.
- Ousman, S. S.; Tomooka, B. H.; van Noort, J. M.; et al. (2007). "Protective and therapeutic role for αB-crystallin in autoimmune demyelination." Nature. 448 (7152): 474–479.
- Han, M. H.; et al. (2008). "Proteomic analysis of active multiple sclerosis lesions reveals therapeutic targets." Nature. 451 (7182): 1076–1081.
- Ho, P. P.; et al. (2012). "Identification of naturally occurring fatty acids of the myelin sheath that resolve neuroinflammation." Science Translational Medicine. 4 (137): 137ra73.
- Steinman, L. (2012). "The discovery of natalizumab, a potent therapeutic for multiple sclerosis." Journal of Cell Biology. 199 (3): 413–416.
- Roep, B. O.; et al. (2013). "Plasmid-encoded proinsulin preserves C-peptide while specifically reducing proinsulin-specific CD8+ T cells in type 1 diabetes." Science Translational Medicine. 5 (191): 191ra82.
- Ahmed, S. S.; et al. (2015). "Antibodies to influenza nucleoprotein cross-react with human hypocretin receptor 2." Science Translational Medicine. 7 (294): 294ra105.
- Steinman, L.; Fox, E.; Hartung, H.-P.; et al. (2022). "Ublituximab versus teriflunomide in relapsing multiple sclerosis." New England Journal of Medicine. 387 (8): 704–714.
- Lanz, T. V.; et al. (2022). "Clonally expanded B cells in multiple sclerosis bind EBV EBNA1 and GlialCAM." Nature. 603 (7900): 321–327.
- Chiot, A.; et al. (2023). "Elevated α5 integrin expression on myeloid cells in motor areas in amyotrophic lateral sclerosis is a therapeutic target." Proceedings of the National Academy of Sciences. 120 (32): e2306731120.
- Steinman, L. (2026). "Multiple molecular mimics in Epstein Barr Nuclear Antigen-1, and the pathogenesis of multiple sclerosis." Proceedings of the National Academy of Sciences. 123 (11): e2519445123.
