= Emraclidine =

Chemical compound

Clinical data
- Other names: CVL-231; PF-06852231
- Routes of administration: Oral
- Drug class: Muscarinic acetylcholine M_{4} receptor positive allosteric modulator; Antipsychotic

Identifiers
- IUPAC name: 1-(2,4-dimethyl-5,7-dihydropyrrolo[3,4-b]pyridin-6-yl)-2-[1-[2-(trifluoromethyl)pyridin-4-yl]azetidin-3-yl]ethanone
- CAS Number: 2170722-84-4
- PubChem CID: 140830653
- DrugBank: DB18706
- ChemSpider: 114856397
- UNII: J241Y80EEO
- KEGG: D12468
- ChEMBL: ChEMBL5314557

Chemical and physical data
- Formula: C_{20}H_{21}F_{3}N_{4}O
- Molar mass: 390.410 g·mol^{−1}
- 3D model (JSmol): Interactive image
- SMILES: CC1=CC(=NC2=C1CN(C2)C(=O)CC3CN(C3)C4=CC(=NC=C4)C(F)(F)F)C
- InChI: InChI=1S/C20H21F3N4O/c1-12-5-13(2)25-17-11-27(10-16(12)17)19(28)6-14-8-26(9-14)15-3-4-24-18(7-15)20(21,22)23/h3-5,7,14H,6,8-11H2,1-2H3; Key:DTCZNKWBDTXEBS-UHFFFAOYSA-N

Emraclidine (INN, USAN; developmental code names CVL-231, PF-06852231) is an investigational antipsychotic for the treatment of both schizophrenia and Alzheimer's disease psychosis developed by Cerevel Therapeutics. On November 11, 2024, AbbVie announced that phase 2 clinical trials did not show an improvement in Positive and Negative Syndrome Scale (PANSS) total scores from baseline when compared to the placebo group.

== Pharmacology ==
=== Mechanism of action ===
Emraclidine is a positive allosteric modulator that selectively targets the muscarinic acetylcholine receptor M4 subtype. The M4 receptor subtype is expressed in the striatum of the brain, which plays a key role in regulating acetylcholine and dopamine levels. An imbalance of these neurotransmitters has been linked to psychotic symptoms in schizophrenia. Unlike other muscarinic receptors, M4 receptor subtypes are selectively expressed in the striatum and activation of these receptors has been shown to indirectly regulate dopamine levels without blocking D2/D3 receptors, which may lead to unwanted motor side effects seen in current antipsychotics. Activation of the M4 receptor subtype may also have antipsychotic effects by reducing cortical glutamatergic hyperactivity, which is associated with schizophrenia, especially in early onset of disease. Knock-out mouse data suggests M4 receptors drive the antipsychotic activity of xanomeline, with M1 receptors believed to contribute to GI side effects.

== History ==
In June 2021, Cerevel first announced positive results from a phase 1b trial evaluating emraclidine in schizophrenia patients. In the phase 1b trial, both treatment groups, assessing 30 mg once daily and 20 mg twice daily, showed clinically meaningful and statistically significant improvements in PANSS total score and were generally well-tolerated compared with placebo after six weeks of treatment. The study demonstrated promising efficacy and safety profiles, supporting further clinical development.

In June 2022, Cerevel initiated two phase 2 trials, EMPOWER-1 and EMPOWER-2, designed to be registration-enabling studies for emraclidine in schizophrenia.

In August 2024, AbbVie completed the acquisition of Cerevel Therapeutics, expanding its neuroscience pipeline with emraclidine.

In November 2024, AbbVie announced that both EMPOWER-1 and EMPOWER-2 trials did not meet their primary endpoints, as emraclidine failed to demonstrate a statistically significant reduction in the PANSS total score compared to placebo.

Following the announcement of phase 2 trial results, AbbVie's shares were down more than 12% compared to the previous close, representing a $40 billion decrease in market capitalization. Shares of Bristol Myers Squibb, which sells Cobenfy, a medicine that emraclidine would have competed against, rose around 12%. AbbVie later disclosed a $3.5 billion impairment charge related to the unsuccessful development of emraclidine in January 2025.

== Research ==
=== Schizophrenia ===
In a phase 1b trial, emraclidine 30 mg once daily (n=27) demonstrated clinically meaningful and statistically significant improvement in PANSS total score at 6 weeks of 12.7 points (Cohen's d=0.68, p=0.023) least squares (LS) mean reduction compared with placebo in schizophrenia patients with acute psychosis. Emraclidine 20 mg twice daily (n=27) demonstrated an 11.1 point (Cohen's d=0.59, p=0.047) improvement. The trial also suggested that emraclidine was not associated with extrapyramidal side effects and weight gain, and that selective activation of the M4 receptor resulted in infrequent gastrointestinal side effects. Results from the phase 1b trial were followed up by two 6-week phase 2 trials.

The EMPOWER program evaluated emraclidine in schizophrenia patients with an acute exacerbation in two placebo-controlled clinical trials studying multiple doses to explore the therapeutic dose range of emraclidine. In phase 2 trial EMPOWER-1, those receiving placebo (n=127) saw a LS mean change in PANSS of -13.5, while those receiving emraclidine 10 mg once daily (n=125) and 30 mg once daily (n=127) saw an LS mean change in PANSS of -14.7 and -16.5, respectively. In EMPOWER-2, those receiving placebo (n=128) saw an LS mean change in PANSS of -16.1, while those receiving emraclidine 15 mg once daily (n=122) and 30 mg once daily (n=123) saw an LS mean change of -18.5 and -14.2, respectively. In these phase 2 trials, emraclidine was well-tolerated, with a safety profile comparable to that seen in the previous phase 1b trial. The most commonly reported adverse events were headache, dry mouth, and dyspepsia.

== See also ==
- List of investigational antipsychotics
- ML-007
- NBI-1117568
- NS-136
- Xanomeline/trospium
