= VU6036864 =

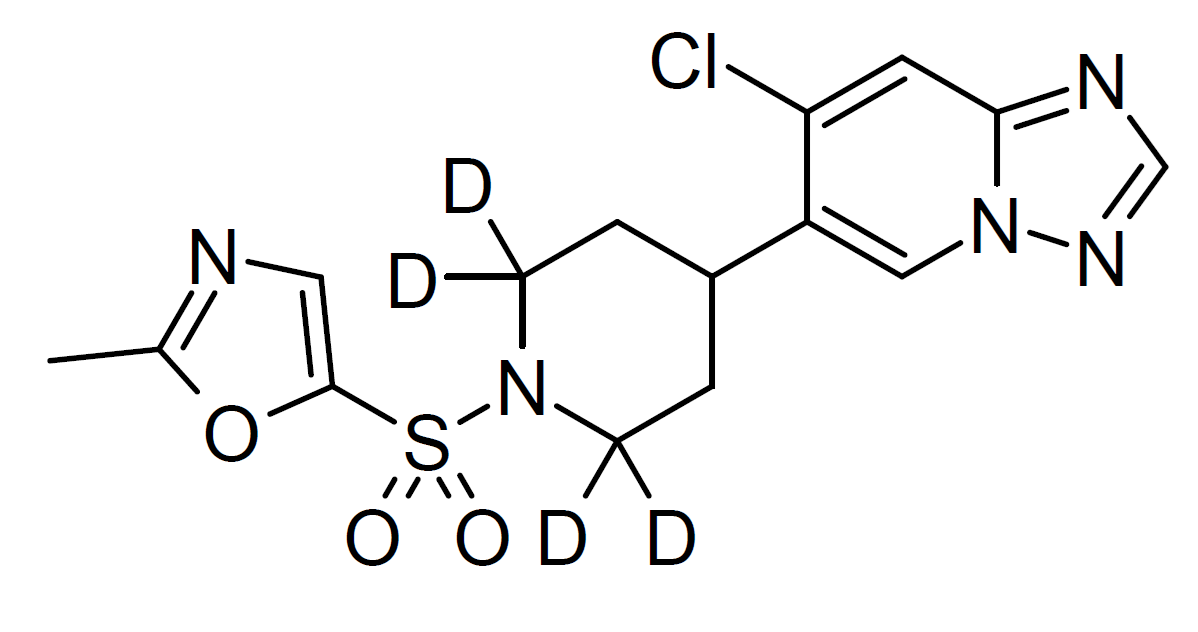

Identifiers
- IUPAC name: 5-[4-(7-chloro-[1,2,4]triazolo[1,5-a]pyridin-6-yl)-2,2,6,6-tetradeuteriopiperidin-1-yl]sulfonyl-2-methyl-1,3-oxazole
- CAS Number: 2746406-36-8
- PubChem CID: 162361022

Chemical and physical data
- Formula: C_{15}H_{12}ClD_{4}N_{5}O_{3}S
- Molar mass: 385.86 g·mol^{−1}
- 3D model (JSmol): Interactive image
- SMILES: [2H]C1(CC(CC(N1S(=O)(=O)C2=CN=C(O2)C)([2H])[2H])C3=CN4C(=NC=N4)C=C3Cl)[2H]
- InChI: InChI=1S/C15H16ClN5O3S/c1-10-17-7-15(24-10)25(22,23)20-4-2-11(3-5-20)12-8-21-14(6-13(12)16)18-9-19-21/h6-9,11H,2-5H2,1H3/i4D2,5D2; Key:URAUBDCJGRESTK-CQOLUAMGSA-N

VU6028418 is an experimental drug that acts as a potent and selective antagonist of the Muscarinic acetylcholine receptor M5. It has superior potency and selectivity compared to older ligands for this receptor and will be useful to characterise its effects, which have previously been difficult to separate from other muscarinic acetylcholine receptors.
