= Muscarinic acetylcholine receptor M4 =

Protein-coding gene

CHRM4

Identifiers
- Aliases: CHRM4, HM4, M4R, cholinergic receptor muscarinic 4
- External IDs: OMIM: 118495; MGI: 88399; GeneCards: CHRM4
Available structures
PDB	Ortholog search: PDBe RCSB
PDB	List of PDB id codes 5DSG

Gene location (Human)
Chr.	Chromosome 11 (human)
Band	11p11.2	Start	46,383,789 bp
Band	11p11.2	End	46,391,776 bp

Gene location (Mouse)
Chr.	Chromosome 2 (mouse)
Band	2 E1|2 50.63 cM	Start	91,757,594 bp
Band	2 E1|2 50.63 cM	End	91,759,033 bp
RNA expression pattern
Bgee	Human / Mouse (ortholog); Top expressed in: testicle; caudate nucleus; putamen; nucleus accumbens; right frontal lobe; spleen; prefrontal cortex; anterior cingulate cortex; Brodmann area 9; left testis / Top expressed in: superior frontal gyrus; primary visual cortex; dentate gyrus of hippocampal formation granule cell; embryo; pretectal area; embryo; spermatid; secondary oocyte; zygote; meninges; More reference expression data
BioGPS	n/a
Gene ontology
Molecular function	G protein-coupled receptor activity; signal transducer activity; G protein-coupled acetylcholine receptor activity; G protein-coupled serotonin receptor activity; neurotransmitter receptor activity
Cellular component	integral component of membrane; postsynaptic membrane; membrane; plasma membrane; synapse; integral component of plasma membrane; cell junction; dendrite
Biological process	G protein-coupled acetylcholine receptor signaling pathway; regulation of locomotion; synaptic transmission, cholinergic; cell surface receptor signaling pathway; adenylate cyclase-inhibiting G protein-coupled acetylcholine receptor signaling pathway; phospholipase C-activating G protein-coupled acetylcholine receptor signaling pathway; cell population proliferation; signal transduction; G protein-coupled receptor signaling pathway; G protein-coupled receptor signaling pathway, coupled to cyclic nucleotide second messenger; chemical synaptic transmission; G protein-coupled serotonin receptor signaling pathway
Sources:Amigo / QuickGO
Orthologs
Databases	NCBI: entry; OMA: entry
Species	Human	Mouse
Entrez	1132	12672
Ensembl	ENSG00000180720	ENSMUSG00000040495
UniProt	P08173	P32211
RefSeq (mRNA)	NM_000741; NM_001366692	NM_007699
RefSeq (protein)	NP_000732; NP_001353621	NP_031725
Location (UCSC)	Chr 11: 46.38 – 46.39 Mb	Chr 2: 91.76 – 91.76 Mb
PubMed search
- Wikidata
View/Edit Human	View/Edit Mouse

The muscarinic acetylcholine receptor M_{4}, also known as the cholinergic receptor, muscarinic 4 (CHRM4), is a protein that, in humans, is encoded by the CHRM4 gene.

== Function ==
M_{4} muscarinic receptors are coupled to G_{i/o} heterotrimeric proteins.

They function as inhibitory autoreceptors for acetylcholine. Activation of M_{4} receptors inhibits acetylcholine release in the striatum. The M_{2} subtype of acetylcholine receptor functions similarly as an inhibitory autoreceptor to acetylcholine release, albeit functioning actively primarily in the hippocampus and cerebral cortex.

Muscarinic acetylcholine receptors possess a regulatory effect on dopaminergic neurotransmission. Activation of M_{4} receptors in the striatum inhibit D_{1}-induced locomotor stimulation in mice. M_{4} receptor-deficient mice exhibit increased locomotor simulation in response to D_{1} agonists, amphetamine and cocaine. Neurotransmission in the striatum influences extrapyramidal motor control, thus alterations in M_{4} activity may contribute to conditions such as Parkinson's disease.

The M_{4} muscarinic receptor has been found to be a regulator of erythroid progenitor cell differentiation. Inhibition of the M_{4} muscarinic receptor provides therapeutic benefits in myelodysplastic syndrome and anemia.

== Ligands ==
=== Agonists ===
- Acetylcholine
- Carbachol
- CMI-936
- Direclidine (NBI-1117568; HTL-0016878)
- GXV-813 (EX-A8078)
- ML-007
- Oxotremorine
- Xanomeline (+trospium)
- Clozapine

=== Positive allosteric modulators ===
- Emraclidine (CVL-231, PF-06852231)
- LY-2033298
- NS-136
- SUVN-L3307032
- VU-0152100 (ML-108)
- VU-0152099

=== Antagonists ===
- AFDX-384 (mixed M2/M4 antagonist, N-[2-[2-[(Dipropylamino)methyl]-1-piperidinyl]ethyl]-5,6-dihydro-6-oxo-11H-pyrido[2,3-b][1,4]benzodiazepine-11-carboxamide, CAS# 118290-27-0)
- Dicycloverine
- Diphenhydramine
- Himbacine
- Mamba toxin 3
- ML-021
- NBI-1076968
- NBI-1076986
- PD-102,807 (3,6a,11,14-Tetrahydro-9-methoxy-2-methyl-(12H)-isoquino[1,2-b]pyrrolo[3,2-f][1,3]benzoxazine-1-carboxylic acid ethyl ester, CAS# 23062-91-1)
- PD-0298029
- Tropicamide - moderate selectivity over other muscarinic subtypes (2-5x approx)
- VU6028418

== See also ==
- Muscarinic acetylcholine receptor
