= VU6028418 =

Identifiers
- IUPAC name: (3aS,6aR)-2-(oxan-4-ylmethyl)-N-[6-(2,3,5-trifluorophenyl)pyridazin-3-yl]-3,3a,4,5,6,6a-hexahydro-1H-cyclopenta[c]pyrrol-5-amine
- CAS Number: 2649803-05-2
- PubChem CID: 164606754
- ChemSpider: 129431227
- ChEMBL: ChEMBL4850236

Chemical and physical data
- Formula: C_{23}H_{27}F_{3}N_{4}O
- Molar mass: 432.491 g·mol^{−1}
- 3D model (JSmol): Interactive image
- SMILES: C1COCCC1CN2C[C@H]3CC(C[C@H]3C2)NC4=NN=C(C=C4)C5=C(C(=CC(=C5)F)F)F
- InChI: InChI=1S/C23H27F3N4O/c24-17-9-19(23(26)20(25)10-17)21-1-2-22(29-28-21)27-18-7-15-12-30(13-16(15)8-18)11-14-3-5-31-6-4-14/h1-2,9-10,14-16,18H,3-8,11-13H2,(H,27,29)/t15-,16+,18?; Key:ITSKPCHXUYILTR-BYICEURKSA-N

VU6028418 is an experimental drug that acts as a potent and selective antagonist of the Muscarinic acetylcholine receptor M4. It has been investigated for the treatment of dystonia and other movement disorders.
