= VU-0152099 =

Names
- IUPAC name 3-Amino-N-(1,3-benzodioxol-5-ylmethyl)-4,6-dimethylthieno[2,3-b]pyridine-2-carboxamide

Identifiers
| CAS Number | 612514-42-8 |
| 3D model (JSmol) | Interactive image |
| ChEMBL | ChEMBL4461667 |
| ChemSpider | 1261401 |
| PubChem CID | 1541501 |
- InChI: InChI=1S/C18H17N3O3S/c1-9-5-10(2)21-18-14(9)15(19)16(25-18)17(22)20-7-11-3-4-12-13(6-11)24-8-23-12/h3-6H,7-8,19H2,1-2H3,(H,20,22) Key: AZOGCTMOKNTHIU-UHFFFAOYSA-N
- SMILES: CC1=CC(=NC2=C1C(=C(S2)C(=O)NCC3=CC4=C(C=C3)OCO4)N)C

Properties
| Chemical formula | C_{18}H_{17}N_{3}O_{3}S |
| Molar mass | 355.41 g·mol^{−1} |
- Except where otherwise noted, data are given for materials in their standard state (at 25 °C [77 °F], 100 kPa). Infobox references

VU-0152099 is a positive allosteric modulator of the M4 receptor used in scientific research.

== Mechanism of action ==
VU-0152099 is a positive allosteric modulator acting at M4 receptors, it lacks agonist activity, which means it cannot activate the receptor on its own, but can potentiate the activity of M4 receptor agonists such as acetylcholine.

== Potential use ==
In rats, VU-0152099 is able to decrease self-administration of cocaine and reverse hyperlocomotion induced by amphetamine.

These tests show that VU-0152099 could potentially be developed as a treatment for addiction to stimulants.

== See also ==
- VU-0152100
