= 77-LH-28-1 =

Chemical compound

Identifiers
- IUPAC name: 1-[3-(4-butylpiperidin-1-yl)propyl]-3,4-dihydroquinolin-2-one
- CAS Number: 560085-11-2
- PubChem CID: 10236758
- IUPHAR/BPS: 3271
- ChemSpider: 8412246
- UNII: 9ZH28BM589
- CompTox Dashboard (EPA): DTXSID90437063

Chemical and physical data
- Formula: C_{21}H_{32}N_{2}O
- Molar mass: 328.500 g·mol^{−1}
- 3D model (JSmol): Interactive image
- SMILES: O=C2N(c1ccccc1CC2)CCCN3CCC(CC3)CCCC
- InChI: InChI=1S/C21H32N2O/c1-2-3-7-18-12-16-22(17-13-18)14-6-15-23-20-9-5-4-8-19(20)10-11-21(23)24/h4-5,8-9,18H,2-3,6-7,10-17H2,1H3; Key:PHMGZAICAOYEAF-UHFFFAOYSA-N

77-LH-28-1 is a selective agonist of muscarinic acetylcholine receptor subtype 1 (M_{1}) discovered in 2008. It is an allosteric agonist, exhibiting over 100-fold specificity for M_{1} over other muscarinic receptor subtypes. 77-LH-28-1 penetrates the brain by crossing the blood–brain barrier and is therefore a useful pharmacological tool with cognition enhancing effects. It has been used as a lead compound for discovery of other M1 agonists, and a crystal structure of the bound complex between 77-LH-28-1 and the M1 receptor has been published.
