= PD-102,807 =

Chemical compound

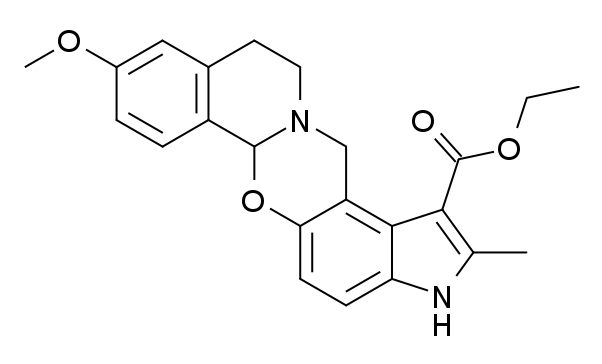

Identifiers
- IUPAC name: ethyl 3,6a,11,14-tetrahydro-9-methoxy-2-methyl-(12H)-isoquino[1,2-b]pyrrolo[3,2-f][1,3]benzoxazine-1-carboxylate
- CAS Number: 23062-91-1
- PubChem CID: 4995951
- ChemSpider: 4175916
- UNII: A7U96364HK
- ChEMBL: ChEMBL59898
- CompTox Dashboard (EPA): DTXSID20407355

Chemical and physical data
- Formula: C_{23}H_{24}N_{2}O_{4}
- Molar mass: 392.455 g·mol^{−1}
- 3D model (JSmol): Interactive image
- SMILES: CCOC(=O)c1c(C)[nH]c(c1c3C5)ccc3OC2N5CCc4c2ccc(OC)c4
- InChI: InChI=1S/C23H24N2O4/c1-4-28-23(26)20-13(2)24-18-7-8-19-17(21(18)20)12-25-10-9-14-11-15(27-3)5-6-16(14)22(25)29-19/h5-8,11,22,24H,4,9-10,12H2,1-3H3; Key:VDDUJINYXKGZLV-UHFFFAOYSA-N

PD-102,807 is a drug which acts as a selective antagonist for the muscarinic acetylcholine receptor M_{4}. It is used in scientific research for studying the effects of the different muscarinic receptor subtypes in the body and brain.

== See also ==
- PD-0298029
- NBI-1076968
