= BQCA =

Identifiers
- IUPAC name: 1-[(4-methoxyphenyl)methyl]-4-oxoquinoline-3-carboxylic acid
- CAS Number: 338747-41-4
- PubChem CID: 1476756
- ChemSpider: 1218427
- ChEBI: CHEBI:232407
- ChEMBL: ChEMBL608112
- CompTox Dashboard (EPA): DTXSID20363104

Chemical and physical data
- Formula: C_{18}H_{15}NO_{4}
- Molar mass: 309.321 g·mol^{−1}
- 3D model (JSmol): Interactive image
- SMILES: COC1=CC=C(C=C1)CN2C=C(C(=O)C3=CC=CC=C32)C(=O)O
- InChI: InChI=1S/C18H15NO4/c1-23-13-8-6-12(7-9-13)10-19-11-15(18(21)22)17(20)14-4-2-3-5-16(14)19/h2-9,11H,10H2,1H3,(H,21,22); Key:BZBBTGCKPRSPGF-UHFFFAOYSA-N

BQCA (benzyl quinolone carboxylic acid) is an experimental drug that acts as a potent and selective positive allosteric modulator of the Muscarinic acetylcholine receptor M1. It was one of the first M1-selective positive allosteric modulators to be discovered, originally developed as a potential treatment agent for cognitive symptoms of schizophrenia, and while BQCA itself was not adopted for clinical use due to its poor side effect profile it is still used in research, and has led to the discovery of a wide range of structurally related M1 PAMs.
