= MK-7622 =

Clinical data
- Drug class: positive allosteric modulator of M1 muscarinic receptor

Identifiers
- IUPAC name: 3-[(1S,2S)-2-hydroxycyclohexyl]-6-[(6-methyl-3-pyridinyl)methyl]benzo[h]quinazolin-4-one
- CAS Number: 1227923-29-6
- PubChem CID: 46207733
- DrugBank: DB12897
- UNII: 57R7D1Q49R
- ChEMBL: ChEMBL4078588
- ECHA InfoCard: 100.209.716

Chemical and physical data
- Formula: C_{25}H_{25}N_{3}O_{2}
- Molar mass: 399.494 g·mol^{−1}
- 3D model (JSmol): Interactive image
- SMILES: CC1=NC=C(C=C1)CC2=CC3=C(C4=CC=CC=C42)N=CN(C3=O)[C@H]5CCCC[C@@H]5O
- InChI: InChI=1S/C25H25N3O2/c1-16-10-11-17(14-26-16)12-18-13-21-24(20-7-3-2-6-19(18)20)27-15-28(25(21)30)22-8-4-5-9-23(22)29/h2-3,6-7,10-11,13-15,22-23,29H,4-5,8-9,12H2,1H3/t22-,23-/m0/s1; Key:JUVQLZBJFOGEEO-GOTSBHOMSA-N

The MK-7622 is the first-of-its-kind oral positive allosteric modulator of M_{1} muscarinic receptors, developed by Merck for the treatment of Alzheimer’s disease, with a structure comprising a benzoquinazolinone bearing additional complex substituents at positions 3 and 6. MK-7622 failed to pass Phase II clinical trials for the treatment of Alzheimer's disease (as an adjunctive therapy) and has been withdrawn from production.

== Pharmacology ==
=== Pharmacodynamics ===
MK-7622 acts as a highly selective positive allosteric modulator of the M_{1} muscarinic receptor; it exhibits the properties of an allosteric agonist and is characterised by a predominant enhancement of beta-arrestin-associated signalling rather than balanced modulation, which is the cause of some of its cholinergic side effects.

==== Side effects ====
Side effects included behavioural seizures and cognitive impairment.
