= Wylie Vale =

American endocrinologist

Wylie W. Vale Jr.
- Born: July 3, 1941; Houston, Texas, United States
- Died: January 3, 2012 (aged 70); Hana, Hawaii
- Education: Rice University, Baylor College of Medicine
- Known for: discovery of key neuroendocrine hormones
- Awards: Fred Conrad Koch Award; Hans Selye award
- Scientific career
- Fields: Endocrinology
- Workplaces: Salk Institute
- Doctoral advisor: Roger Guillemin

Wylie Walker Vale Jr. (July 3, 1941 – January 3, 2012) was an American endocrinologist who helped identify hormones controlling basic bodily functions.

== Early life and education ==
Vale was born in Houston, Texas, on July 3, 1941. He completed a B.A. degree in biology at Rice University and obtained a Ph.D. in physiology and biochemistry from Baylor College of Medicine. He commenced employment at the Salk Institute for Biological Studies in San Diego, California, in 1970.

== Career ==
In collaboration with his advisor and mentor Roger Guillemin, Vale contributed to the discovery, isolation and identification of thyrotropin releasing hormone and gonadotropin-releasing hormone in the 1970s; work that led to the Nobel Prize for Guillemin.

At the Salk Institute, Vale led efforts in identifying the group of hormones involved in human growth, reproduction and temperature. His group discovered, isolated and identified corticotropin-releasing hormone (CRF/CRH) in 1981 and growth hormone releasing factor (GHRF) in 1982.

Vale also founded two biotechnology companies, Neurocrine Biosciences and Acceleron Pharma.

Vale was head of both the Clayton Foundation Laboratories for Peptide Biology and the Helen McLoraine Chair in Molecular Neurobiology at the Salk Institute. He died in 2012.
