= Milameline =

Chemical compound

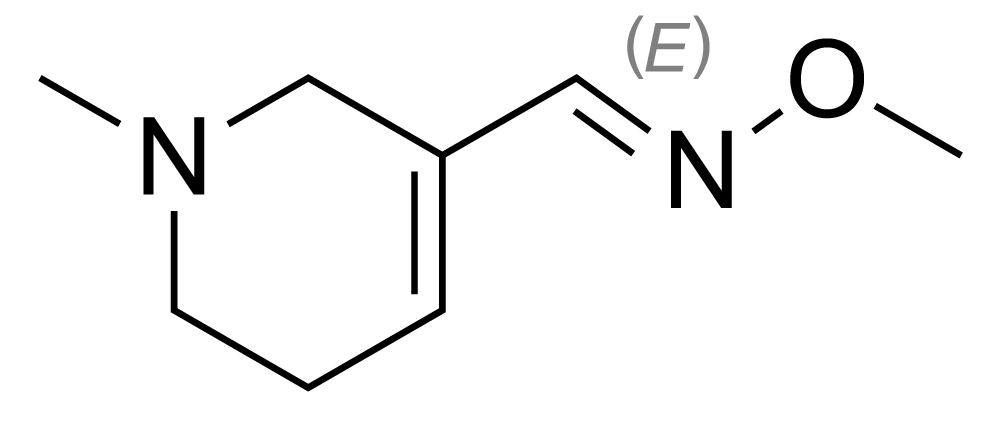

Clinical data
- ATC code: None

Identifiers
- IUPAC name: (E)-N-methoxy-1-(1-methyl-1,2,5,6-tetrahydropyridin-3-yl)methanimine
- CAS Number: 139886-32-1
- PubChem CID: 9571002
- IUPHAR/BPS: 301
- ChemSpider: 7845468
- UNII: R9X77R42FN
- CompTox Dashboard (EPA): DTXSID401028867
- ECHA InfoCard: 100.220.595

Chemical and physical data
- Formula: C_{8}H_{14}N_{2}O
- Molar mass: 154.213 g·mol^{−1}
- 3D model (JSmol): Interactive image
- SMILES: N(/OC)=C\C1=C\CCN(C)C1

Milameline (CI-979, PD-129,409, RU-35,926) is a non-selective muscarinic acetylcholine receptor partial agonist with cognition-acting properties that was being investigated for the treatment of Alzheimer's disease, but produced poor results in clinical trials and was subsequently discontinued.

- Changing the O-methyl aldoxime to an O-propargyl oxime instead gives a separate molecule called RU 35986.

== See also ==
- Alvameline
- Sabcomeline
- Tazomeline
- Xanomeline
