= Xanomeline/trospium chloride =

Medication

- Xanomeline (top) and trospium chloride (bottom)

Combination of
- Xanomeline: Muscarinic agonist
- Trospium chloride: Muscarinic antagonist (peripherally selective)

Clinical data
- Trade names: Cobenfy
- Other names: KarXT
- AHFS/Drugs.com: Monograph
- MedlinePlus: a624070
- License data: US DailyMed: Xanomeline and trospium
- Routes of administration: By mouth
- ATC code: N05AX50 (WHO)

Legal status
- Legal status: US: ℞-only

Identifiers
- KEGG: D12968

Xanomeline/trospium chloride, sold under the brand name Cobenfy, is a fixed-dose combination medication used for the treatment of schizophrenia. It contains xanomeline and trospium chloride, both of which are muscarinic antagonists. Xanomeline is a functionally-preferring muscarinic acetylcholine receptor M_{4} and M_{1} receptor agonist. Trospium chloride is a peripherally-acting non-selective muscarinic antagonist.

The most common side effects of xanomeline/trospium chloride include nausea, indigestion, constipation, vomiting, hypertension, abdominal pain, diarrhea, tachycardia (increased heartbeat), dizziness, and gastroesophageal reflux.

In September 2024, it was approved for medical use in the United States. It is the first antipsychotic drug approved by the US Food and Drug Administration (FDA) to treat schizophrenia that targets cholinergic receptors as opposed to dopamine receptors, which has long been the standard of care. The FDA considers it to be a first-in-class medication. Trospium chloride is a peripherally selective non-selective muscarinic antagonist to quell peripheral muscarinic agonist-dependent side effects. Xanomeline's mechanism of action in this context is hypothesized to be via modulating certain neurotransmitter circuits, including acetylcholine, dopamine, and glutamate, which can provide therapeutic benefits in schizophrenia and related conditions.

== Medical uses ==
Xanomeline/trospium chloride is indicated for the treatment of schizophrenia in adults.

== Adverse effects ==
The US Food and Drug Administration (FDA) prescribing information for the combination includes warnings that xanomeline/trospium chloride can cause urinary retention, increased heart rate, decreased gastric movement or angioedema (swelling beneath the skin) of the face and lips.

The most common side effects of xanomeline/trospium chloride include nausea, indigestion, constipation, vomiting, hypertension, abdominal pain, diarrhea, tachycardia (increased heartbeat), dizziness, and gastroesophageal reflux disease.

== Mechanism of action ==
Preclinical data supports the hypothesis that xanomeline's central mechanism of action is mediated primarily through stimulation of brain muscarinic M_{4} and M_{1} receptors. M_{4} muscarinic receptors are most highly expressed in the midbrain, which controls motor and action planning, decision-making, motivation, reinforcement, and reward perception. M_{1} muscarinic receptors are most highly expressed in the cerebral cortical regions, which regulate higher-level processes including language, memory, reasoning, thought, learning, decision-making, emotion, intelligence, and personality. Unlike direct dopamine D_{2} and serotonin 5-HT_{2A} blocking antipsychotic medications, M_{4} and M_{1} receptor stimulation indirectly rebalances dopaminergic and glutamatergic circuits involved in the symptoms associated with neurological and neuropsychiatric diseases such as schizophrenia and Alzheimer's disease. Based on preclinical pharmacological and genetic studies, M_{4} receptors appear to modulate both psychosis and cognitive symptom domains while M_{1} predominantly modulates cognitive symptom domains and modestly regulates psychosis symptom domains.

Trospium chloride is a non-selective muscarinic antagonist, but does not cross the blood–brain barrier. As a result, it is able to counteract the peripheral side effects of xanomeline caused by M_{4} and M_{1} receptor activation without affecting the central nervous system.

== History ==
Xanomeline was first synthesized in 1997 in a collaboration between pharmaceutical firms Eli Lilly and Novo Nordisk with the goal of delaying cognitive decline in people with Alzheimer's disease. In a phase II study, significant improvements in cognition were observed in people with Alzheimer's along with surprising improvements in behavioral symptoms such as hallucinations, delusions, suspiciousness and agitation. In a follow-up placebo-controlled study in participants with schizophrenia, similar effects on symptoms of psychosis was observed with xanomeline. However, cholinergic-mediated side effects prevented advancement of xanomeline into phase III trials.

Xanomeline was licensed to Karuna Therapeutics in 2012 and KarXT was subsequently created as a dual drug formulation by adding trospium. Trospium is a non-brain-penetrant and non-selective muscarinic receptor blocker that may ameliorate the peripheral side effects of xanomeline. In 2019, the EMERGENT-1 placebo controlled phase II clinical trial of KarXT in adults with schizophrenia met the primary endpoint of a change from baseline in the positive and negative syndrome scale (PANSS) total score at week 5 vs. placebo. The results from the trial were subsequently published in the New England Journal of Medicine. In August 2022, Karuna Therapeutics announced that KarXT has achieved the primary endpoint in the phase III EMERGENT-2 trial and in March 2023, Karuna Therapeutics announced that KarXT had met its primary endpoint in the phase III EMERGENT-3, and that it was submitting the drug for approval by the US Food and Drug Administration (FDA). The results from the EMERGENT-2 and EMERGENT-3 clinical trials were published in the LANCET and JAMA-Psychiatry respectively. In September 2023, Karuna announced that it has submitted the new drug application (NDA) for KarXT and in November 2023, the FDA began its review and set the PDUFA date for September 2024.

The FDA evaluated the effectiveness of xanomeline/trospium chloride for the treatment of schizophrenia in adults based on two studies with identical designs. Study 1 (NCT04659161, EMERGENT-2) and study 2 (NCT04738123, EMERGENT-2) were 5-week, randomized, double-blind, placebo-controlled, multi-center studies in adults with a diagnosis of schizophrenia according to DSM-5 criteria. The primary efficacy measure was the change from baseline in the positive and negative syndrome scale (PANSS) total score at week 5. The PANSS is a 30-item scale that measures symptoms of schizophrenia. Each item is rated by a clinician on a seven-point scale. In both studies, the participants who received xanomeline/trospium chloride experienced a meaningful reduction in symptoms from baseline to week 5 as measured by the PANSS total score compared to the placebo group. The FDA granted the approval of xanomeline/tropsium to Bristol-Myers Squibb, which acquired Karuna Therapeutics during the FDA review in March 2024. Xanomeline/trospium, also known as KarXT, is marketed under the name Cobenfy. Cobenfy is a trademark of Karuna Therapeutics.

The EMERGENT-2 and EMERGENT-3 trials enrolled 470 adults with schizophrenia. The trials were conducted at 39 sites in the United States and Ukraine. There were 425 trial participants from the United States. The efficacy of the combination (which is a measure of how well the drug works) was evaluated in two clinical trials for 470 participants with schizophrenia, and safety was assessed in the two trials in a total of 504 participants with schizophrenia who received at least one dose of xanomeline/trospium chloride. The same trials were used to assess efficacy and safety. The number of participants representing efficacy findings differs from the number of participants representing safety findings due to different pools of study participants analyzed for efficacy and safety. In the trials, participants were randomly assigned to receive xanomeline/trospium chloride or placebo, and neither participants nor care providers knew which treatment was given during the trial. Symptoms of schizophrenia were measured using a clinician-administered measure of schizophrenia symptoms called the Positive and Negative Syndrome Scale (PANSS). The benefit of COBENFY was assessed in both trials by determining the improvement in schizophrenia symptoms (the difference in PANSS scores before and after five weeks of treatment).

== Society and culture ==
=== Legal status ===
Xanomeline/trospium chloride was approved for medical use in the United States in September 2024.

=== Economics ===
In 2024, Bristol Myers Squibb purchased Karuna Therapeutics for US$14 billion. Bristol Myers Squibb set the wholesale cost of the combo at $1,850 a month.

== Research ==
=== Long-acting injectable prodrugs ===
A long-acting injectable (LAI) formulation of xanomeline/trospium chloride prodrugs is under development for the treatment of schizophrenia. It is being developed by Terran Biosciences under the developmental code name TerXT or TerXT-LAI. The prodrugs are slowly metabolized to xanomeline and trospium chloride, and are expected to have a duration of several months. As of May 2024, TerXT is in the preclinical stage of development.

== See also ==
- List of investigational antipsychotics
- List of investigational bipolar disorder drugs
