= Muscarinic acetylcholine receptor M1 =

Protein-coding gene in the species Homo sapiens

CHRM1
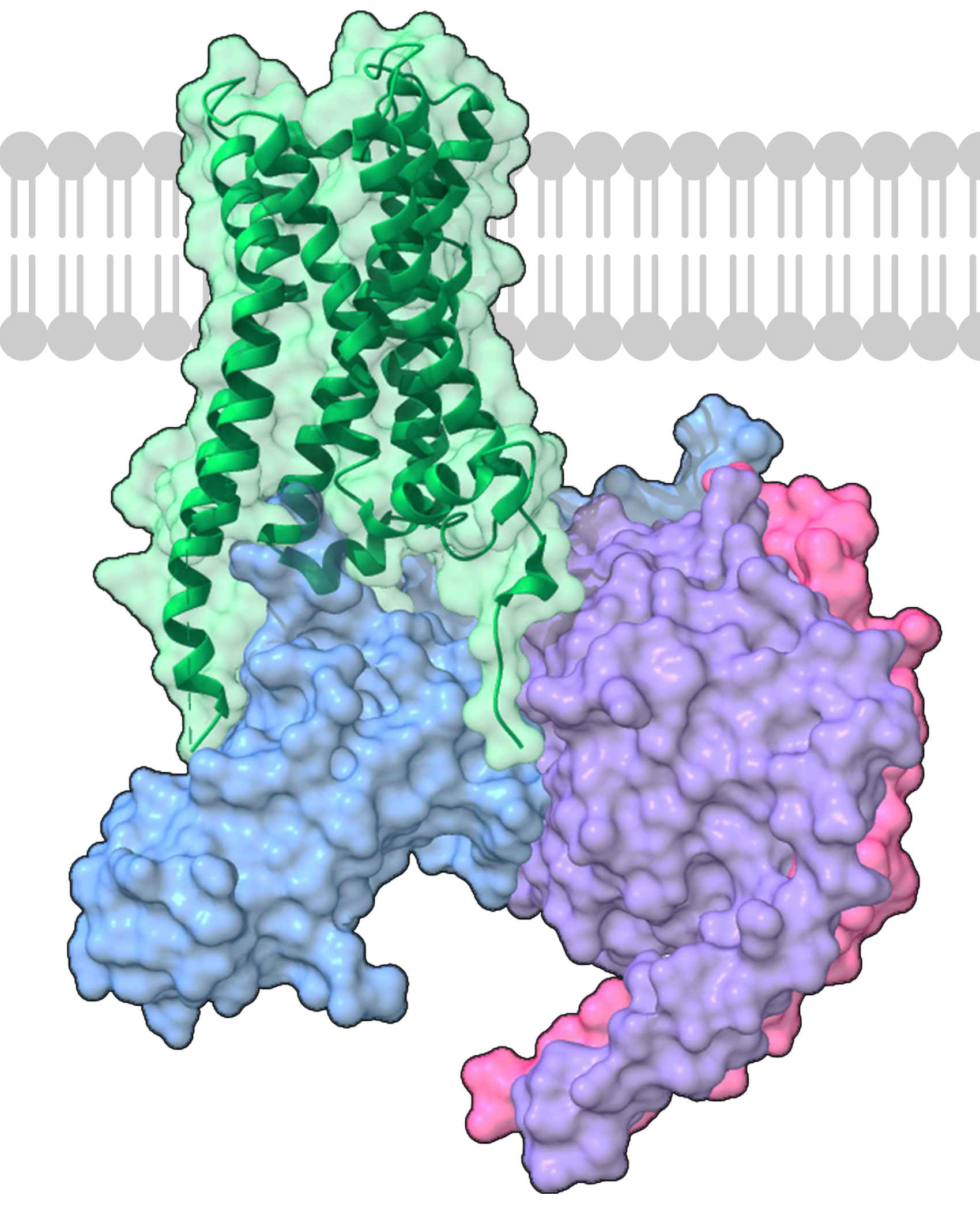

Identifiers
- Aliases: CHRM1, HM1, M1, M1R, cholinergic receptor muscarinic 1
- External IDs: OMIM: 118510; MGI: 88396; GeneCards: CHRM1
Available structures
PDB	Ortholog search: PDBe RCSB
PDB	List of PDB id codes 5CXV

Gene location (Human)
Chr.	Chromosome 11 (human)
Band	11q12.3	Start	62,908,679 bp
Band	11q12.3	End	62,921,807 bp

Gene location (Mouse)
Chr.	Chromosome 19 (mouse)
Band	19|19 A	Start	8,641,153 bp
Band	19|19 A	End	8,660,951 bp
RNA expression pattern
Bgee	Human / Mouse (ortholog); Top expressed in: prefrontal cortex; middle temporal gyrus; Brodmann area 9; right frontal lobe; superior frontal gyrus; nucleus accumbens; postcentral gyrus; cingulate gyrus; anterior cingulate cortex; putamen / Top expressed in: dentate gyrus of hippocampal formation granule cell; superior frontal gyrus; primary visual cortex; hippocampus proper; olfactory tubercle; nucleus accumbens; primary motor cortex; piriform cortex; prefrontal cortex; perirhinal cortex; More reference expression data
BioGPS	n/a
Gene ontology
Molecular function	G protein-coupled receptor activity; signal transducer activity; phosphatidylinositol phospholipase C activity; G protein-coupled acetylcholine receptor activity; neurotransmitter receptor activity involved in regulation of postsynaptic membrane potential; G protein-coupled serotonin receptor activity; neurotransmitter receptor activity
Cellular component	axon terminus; integral component of membrane; postsynaptic membrane; membrane; postsynaptic density; plasma membrane; integral component of plasma membrane; cell junction; dendrite; asymmetric synapse; synapse; Schaffer collateral - CA1 synapse; glutamatergic synapse; cholinergic synapse; integral component of postsynaptic membrane; integral component of presynaptic membrane; integral component of postsynaptic density membrane
Biological process	positive regulation of intracellular protein transport; G protein-coupled receptor signaling pathway; cognition; regulation of locomotion; synaptic transmission, cholinergic; saliva secretion; nervous system development; neuromuscular synaptic transmission; protein kinase C-activating G protein-coupled receptor signaling pathway; adenylate cyclase-inhibiting G protein-coupled acetylcholine receptor signaling pathway; positive regulation of ion transport; positive regulation of cell population proliferation; phospholipase C-activating G protein-coupled acetylcholine receptor signaling pathway; cell population proliferation; regulation of vascular associated smooth muscle contraction; signal transduction; G protein-coupled acetylcholine receptor signaling pathway; regulation of postsynaptic membrane potential; G protein-coupled receptor signaling pathway, coupled to cyclic nucleotide second messenger; chemical synaptic transmission; G protein-coupled serotonin receptor signaling pathway; regulation of glial cell proliferation
Sources:Amigo / QuickGO
Orthologs
Databases	NCBI: entry; OMA: entry
Species	Human	Mouse
Entrez	1128	12669
Ensembl	ENSG00000168539	ENSMUSG00000032773
UniProt	P11229	P12657
RefSeq (mRNA)	NM_000738	NM_001112697; NM_007698
RefSeq (protein)	NP_000729	NP_001106167; NP_031724
Location (UCSC)	Chr 11: 62.91 – 62.92 Mb	Chr 19: 8.64 – 8.66 Mb
PubMed search
- Wikidata
View/Edit Human	View/Edit Mouse

The Muscarinic Acetylcholine receptor M_{1}, also known as the Cholinergic receptor, Muscarinic 1, is a muscarinic receptor that in humans is encoded by the CHRM1 gene. It is localized to 11q13.

The locations of M_{1} receptor includes but not limited to various 'Secretory glands

This receptor is found mediating slow EPSP at the ganglion in the postganglionic nerve, and is common in exocrine glands and in the CNS.

It is predominantly found bound to G proteins of class G_{q} that use upregulation of phospholipase C and, therefore, inositol trisphosphate and intracellular calcium as a signalling pathway. A receptor so bound would not be susceptible to CTX or PTX. However, G_{i} (causing a downstream decrease in cAMP) and G_{s} (causing an increase in cAMP) have also been shown to be involved in interactions in certain tissues, and so would be susceptible to PTX and CTX respectively.

== Effects ==
- EPSP in autonomic ganglia
- Secretion from salivary glands
- Gastric acid secretion from stomach
- Via the central nervous system (especially within the brain); mediating certain core aspects of perception, attention, cognitive functioning and likely; memory consolidation. This is a notable component in regards to the M_{1} receptor since it helps explain how pharmacological compounds which antagonize the receptor site can consistently produce mental states like delirium (a major disruption in attention and decrease in baseline-level cognitive functioning), as well as the unusual and often frightening states of consciousness induced by M_{1} blocking recreational drugs such as Datura or diphenhydramine. As of 2015, the M_{1} receptor remains the only known muscarinic receptor to have this effect of hallucinogenic delirium when its functionality is inhibited or antagonized.
- Cognitive flexibility
- Synaptic plasticity modulation
- Anxiety-like behavior and spontaneous working memory
- Task switching
- Vagally-induced bronchoconstriction
- Mediating olfactory neural pathways which help regulate aggression, mating, and social behavior in rodents.

== Occurrence in human pathogenic amoebae ==
A structural but not sequential homolog of the human M1 receptor has been described in Acanthamoeba castellanii and Naegleria fowleri by a group of researchers working at Aga Khan University.

Drugs with significant antimuscarinic side effects such as chlorpromazine appear to show inhibitory effects on cultured Naegleria fowleri cells.

== Mechanism ==
It couples to G_{q}, and, to a small extent, G_{i} and G_{s}. This results in slow EPSP and decreased K^{+} conductance. It is preassembled to the G_{q} heterotrimer through a polybasic c-terminal domain.

== Ligands ==
=== Agonists ===
- Acetylcholine
- Arecoline
- Carbachol
- Cevimeline
- Itameline
- Muscarine
- Oxotremorine
- Pilocarpine
- Vedaclidine
- Xanomeline
- 77-LH-28-1 - brain penetrant selective M_{1} allosteric agonist
- CDD-0097
- McN-A-343 - mixed M1/M4 agonist
- L-689, L-660 - mixed M1/M3 agonist

=== Allosteric modulators ===
- BQCA
- BQZ-12
- MK-7622 - positive allosteric modulator
- MIPS-1780 - positive allosteric modulator
- PQCA - positive allosteric modulator
- VU-0090157
- VU-0029767
- VU0467319
- [^{3}H]PT-1284- M1-selective PAM Radioligand
- ANAVEX 3-71 (formerly AF710B) - PAM and σ1R agonist

=== Antagonists ===
- Atropine
- Diphenhydramine
- Scopolamine
- Tramadol
- Dicycloverine
- Fluoxetine
- Hyoscyamine
- Ipratropium
- Mamba toxin muscarinic toxin 7 (MT7)
- Many antipsychotics like olanzapine, quetiapine, clozapine, chlorpromazine
- Pirenzepine
- Oxybutynin
- Benzatropine
- Telenzepine
- Paroxetine
- PIPE-307 / JNJ-89495120
- PIPE-359
- Tricyclic antidepressants like clomipramine, imipramine, amitriptyline
- Tolterodine
- Biperiden

== See also ==
- Muscarinic acetylcholine receptor
