= Xanomeline =

Chemical compound

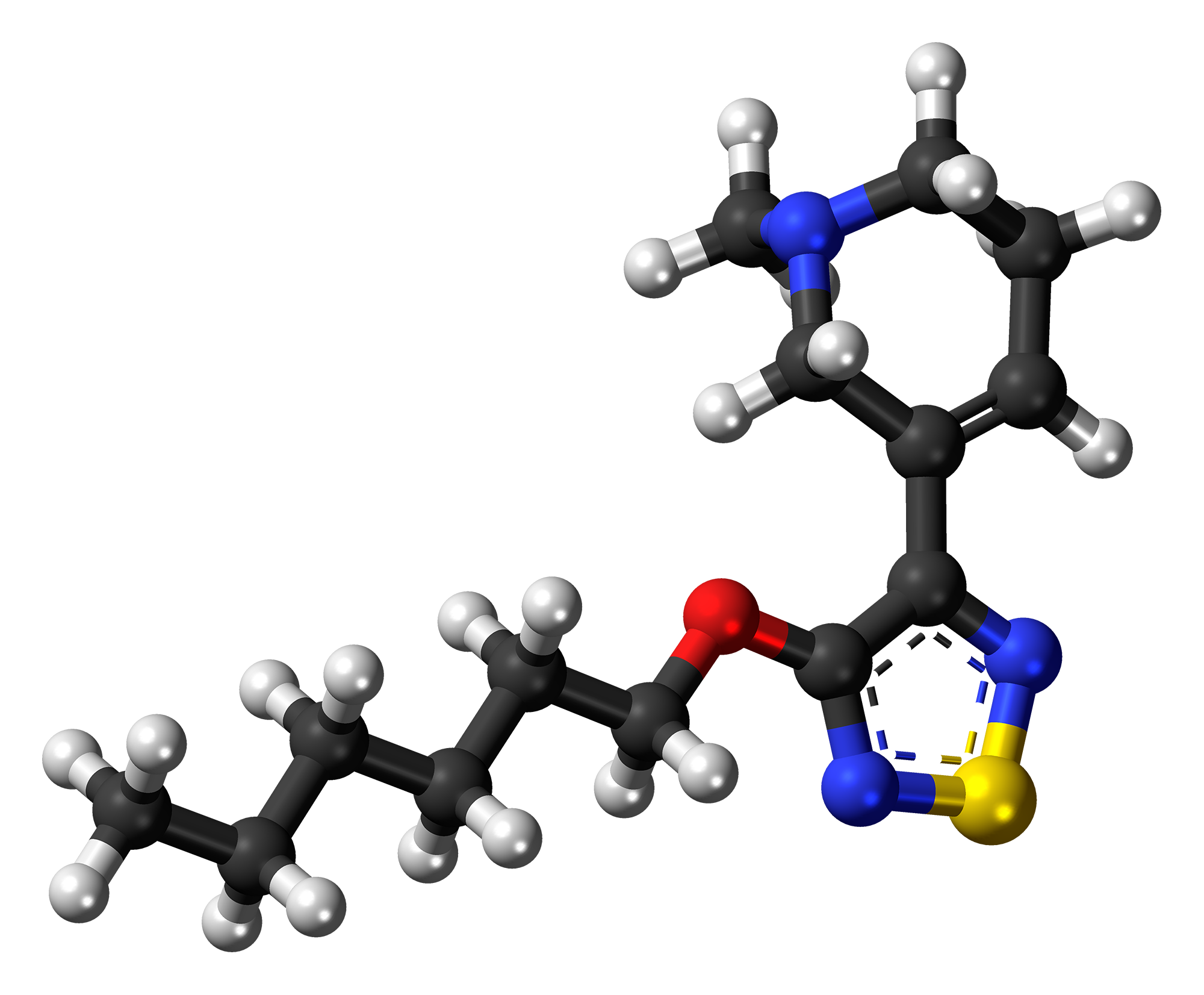

Clinical data
- Pronunciation: /zʌˈnoʊməliːn/ zuh-NOH-mə-leen
- Other names: LY-246,708; LY246708; LY-246708; NNC 11-0232; Hexyloxy-TZTP
- Routes of administration: Oral
- Drug class: Muscarinic acetylcholine receptor agonist
- ATC code: None

Identifiers
- IUPAC name: 3-hexoxy-4-(1-methyl-3,6-dihydro-2H-pyridin-5-yl)-1,2,5-thiadiazole
- CAS Number: 131986-45-3
- PubChem CID: 60809
- IUPHAR/BPS: 57
- DrugBank: DB15357
- ChemSpider: 54797
- UNII: 9ORI6L73CJ
- KEGG: D06330
- ChEBI: CHEBI:10056
- ChEMBL: ChEMBL21536
- CompTox Dashboard (EPA): DTXSID60157286
- ECHA InfoCard: 100.208.938

Chemical and physical data
- Formula: C_{14}H_{23}N_{3}OS
- Molar mass: 281.42 g·mol^{−1}
- 3D model (JSmol): Interactive image
- SMILES: CCCCCCOC1=NSN=C1C2=CCCN(C2)C
- InChI: InChI=1S/C14H23N3OS/c1-3-4-5-6-10-18-14-13(15-19-16-14)12-8-7-9-17(2)11-12/h8H,3-7,9-11H2,1-2H3; Key:JOLJIIDDOBNFHW-UHFFFAOYSA-N

Xanomeline (developmental code name LY-246,708) is a small molecule muscarinic acetylcholine receptor agonist that was synthesized in a collaboration between Eli Lilly and Novo as an investigational therapeutic being studied for the treatment of central nervous system (CNS) disorders.

Its pharmacological action is mediated primarily through stimulation of central nervous system muscarinic M_{1} and M_{4} receptor subtypes. Xanomeline is a non-selective muscarinic acetylcholine receptor agonist with similar high affinity for all five muscarinic acetylcholine receptor subtypes but has greater agonistic activity at the M_{1} and M_{4} subtypes.

Xanomeline/trospium (Cobenfy), is a combination medication used in the treatment of schizophrenia.

== Pharmacology ==
=== Pharmacodynamics ===
Xanomeline binding affinities
Target	Affinity (K_{i}, nM)	Species
M_{1}	7.9–82	Human
M_{2}	8.1–724	Human
M_{3}	7.8–40	Human
M_{4}	11–72	Human
M_{5}	9.3–80	Human
nACh (neuronal)	>10,000	Undefined
nACh (muscle)	>10,000	Undefined
5-HT_{1A}	63	Human
5-HT_{1B}	50	Human
5-HT_{1D}	6.3	Human
5-HT_{1E}	2,512	Human
5-HT_{1F}	316	Human
5-HT_{2A}	126	Human
5-HT_{2B}	20	Human
5-HT_{2C}	40	Human
5-HT_{3}	>10,000	Undefined
5-HT_{4}	251	Porcine
5-HT_{5A}	ND	ND
5-HT_{6}	1,259	Human
5-HT_{7}	126	Human
α_{1}-Adrenergic	2020	Rat
α_{2}-Adrenergic	1000	Rat
α_{2B}-Adrenergic	1,585	Human
D_{2}	1,000	Human
D_{3}	398	Human
H_{1}	398	Rat
ChT	1,390	Undefined
DAT	457	Undefined
NET	1,630	Undefined
SERT	>10,000	Undefined
Notes: Values are K_{i}, unless otherwise specified. The smaller the value, the more strongly the drug binds to the site. Refs:

==== Muscarinic acetylcholine receptor agonist ====
Xanomeline is an agonist that primarily targets the muscarinic acetylcholine receptor family of five muscarinic receptor subtypes, which are designated M_{1}-M_{5}. While it binds with near identical affinity to all five of the muscarinic receptor subtypes as measured by displacement of a muscarinic radioligand, the preponderance of evidence suggests that xanomeline acts preferentially in the central nervous system as a functionally selective partial agonist at the M_{1} and M_{4} muscarinic receptors. It has more modest partial agonist pharmacology at the M_{2}, M_{3} and M_{5} receptors.

In addition to its muscarinic acetylcholine M_{1} and M_{4} receptor agonism, xanomeline has been found to act as an antagonist or partial agonist of the M_{5} receptor.

==== Other actions ====
Aside from its actions at the muscarinic acetylcholine receptors, xanomeline has relatively high affinity for certain other targets, such as various serotonin receptors. It acts specifically as a partial agonist of the serotonin 5-HT_{1A} receptor, as an agonist of the serotonin 5-HT_{1B} receptor, and as an antagonist of the serotonin 5-HT_{2A}, 5-HT_{2B}, and 5-HT_{2C} receptors.

Xanomeline may inhibit CYP3A4 and P-glycoprotein locally in the intestines, but does not inhibit them systemically.

==== Mechanism of action ====
Xanomeline modulates certain dopaminergic and glutamatergic circuits in the brain that can provide therapeutic benefits in patients suffering from neuropsychiatric and neurological diseases such as schizophrenia and Alzheimer's disease through stimulation primarily of central M_{1} and M_{4} muscarinic receptor subtypes. Muscarinic M_{1} and M_{4} receptors have been shown in preclinical studies to be expressed in areas important for dopamine and glutamate neural circuit regulation (e.g. frontal cortex and dorsal and ventral striatum). Xanomeline has shown antipsychotic-like effects in various preclinical behavioral models, such as attenuation of amphetamine-induced locomotor hyperactivity, effects that are dependent on M_{1} and M_{4} receptor activation.

=== Pharmacokinetics ===
CYP2D6 significantly contributes to the metabolism of xanomeline. As a result, CYP2D6 polymorphisms are expected to affect the patient's exposure to xanomeline.

== Chemistry ==
Xanomeline has structural and pharmacological similarities to the main psychoactive ingredient in betel nut, arecoline, and the natural muscarinic receptor neurotransmitter, acetylcholine. Xanomeline is an achiral and lipophilic small molecule with a molecular weight of 281.4 (also known as hexyloxy-TZTP, LY246708, Lumeron, Memcor - Eli Lilly; NNC 11-0232 - Novo; Kar-XT, Karuna Therapeutics). Xanomeline's physical chemical properties, including low molecular weight, lipophilicity, and absence of hydrogen bond donors, favor its entry into the brain with a high brain to plasma ratio (> 10:1).

== Clinical development ==
Xanomeline was first discovered in a therapeutic development collaboration between Eli Lilly & Co. and Novo pharmaceutical companies in the early 1990s. Eli Lilly led the first clinical development effort of xanomeline through a phase 2 clinical trial to test the hypothesis that it would improve cognition in patients suffering from cognitive decline observed in Alzheimer's disease, with positive results for cognitive decline and an unexpected effect against delusions and hallucination. A small placebo-controlled study in treatment-resistant schizophrenia followed, demonstrating its antipsychotic-like action.

Xanomeline's development was discontinued primarily due to cholinergic side effects observed in clinical studies. Further development was enabled through a novel co-formulation strategy, xanomeline/trospium (developmental name KarXT), with the peripherally restricted muscarinic antagonist, trospium, to quell the peripheral cholinergic side effects. In March 2023, Karuna Therapeutics announced that KarXT had met its primary endpoint in a phase III trial, EMERGENT-3, and that it was submitting the drug for approval by the US Food and Drug Administration (FDA). In September 2024, the combination drug was approved by the FDA.

== See also ==
- List of investigational antipsychotics
