= Alasdair MacLullich =

Academic and scientist

Alasdair M. J. MacLullich
- Education: University of Edinburgh
- Known for: Development of the 4 'A's Test (4AT), Co-founding the European Delirium Association
- Scientific career
- Fields: Geriatric Medicine, Delirium, Cognitive Aging, Neuropsychology
- Workplaces: University of Edinburgh
- Website: https://www.alasdairmaclullich.com/

Alasdair MacLullich is a British geriatrician and professor at The Usher Institute at the University of Edinburgh. His research focus is on delirium. He is known for developing the 4 'A's Test (4AT) medical scale for assessing delirium and for co-founding the European Delirium Association.

== Education ==
MacLullich attended the University of Edinburgh as an undergraduate. After medical school, he earned a PhD on glucocorticoids and cognitive ageing.

== Career ==
MacLullich's research focuses on delirium and cognition. He developed the widely used 4 'A's Test (4AT) clinical assessment tool for delirium.

MacLullich co-founded the European Delirium Association in 2006 and served as its president from 2012 to 2015.

He is the editor-in-chief of the journal Delirium.

== Other activities ==
- Chair of the Scottish Hip Fracture Audit Steering Group.
- Co-founded World Delirium Awareness Day (WDAD) and co-runs the associated website.
- Co-chaired the committee that produced the 2019 Scottish Intercollegiate Guidelines Network (SIGN) guidelines on 'Risk reduction and management of delirium'.
- Academic panellist for the Anscombe Bioethics Centre.
- Curated a collection of delirium research for the British Geriatrics Society.

== Selected publications ==
- "New horizons in the pathogenesis, assessment and management of delirium". Age and Ageing. 42 (6): 667–674. 2013. doi:10.1093/ageing/aft148. PMC 3809721. PMID 24067500.
- "CSF biomarkers in delirium: a systematic review". International Journal of Geriatric Psychiatry. 33 (11): 1479–1500. 2018. doi:10.1002/gps.4720. hdl:20.500.11820/5933392d-bf79-4b57-940f-8a5c51f3b02e. PMID 28628246.
- "Three key areas in progressing delirium practice and knowledge". Age and Ageing. 51 (11) afac271. 2022. doi:10.1093/ageing/afac271. PMC 9704028. PMID 36309474.
