= C30H26O14 =

The molecular formula C_{30}H_{26}O_{14} may refer to:

- Delphinidin-3-O-(6-p-coumaroyl)glucoside
- Prodelphinidin B9
- Theasinensin C
- Theasinensin E
