= Theasinensin A =

Chemical compound

Names
- Other names (1M)-6,6′-Bis{(2R,3R)-5,7-dihydroxy-3-[(3,4,5-trihydroxybenzoyl)oxy]-3,4-dihydro-2H-1-benzopyran-2-yl}-[1,1′-biphenyl]-2,2′,3,3′,4,4′-hexol

Identifiers
CAS Number	89064-31-3
3D model (JSmol)	Interactive image
ChEBI	CHEBI:9518
ChEMBL	ChEMBL349197
ChemSpider	390965
KEGG	C09972
PubChem CID	442543
CompTox Dashboard (EPA)	DTXSID50331871
- InChI: InChI=1S/C44H34O22/c45-15-5-21(47)17-11-31(65-43(61)13-1-23(49)35(55)24(50)2-13)41(63-29(17)7-15)19-9-27(53)37(57)39(59)33(19)34-20(10-28(54)38(58)40(34)60)42-32(12-18-22(48)6-16(46)8-30(18)64-42)66-44(62)14-3-25(51)36(56)26(52)4-14/h1-10,31-32,41-42,45-60H,11-12H2/t31-,32-,41-,42-/m1/s1 Key: YUULFXAQUWEYNP-GXAWFILRSA-N
- SMILES: C1C(C(OC2=CC(=CC(=C21)O)O)C3=CC(=C(C(=C3C4=C(C(=C(C=C4C5C(CC6=C(C=C(C=C6O5)O)O)OC(=O)C7=CC(=C(C(=C7)O)O)O)O)O)O)O)O)O)OC(=O)C8=CC(=C(C(=C8)O)O)O

Properties
Chemical formula	C_{44}H_{34}O_{22}
Molar mass	914.734 g·mol^{−1}
- Except where otherwise noted, data are given for materials in their standard state (at 25 °C [77 °F], 100 kPa). Infobox references

Theasinensin A is polyphenol flavonoid from black tea (Camellia sinensis) created during fermentation, by oxidation of epigallocatechin gallate.

One important take-home is that theasinensin A is only poorly soluble in water & to get the best possible extraction must employ an alcoholic medium.

While it is known that EGCG has enjoyed use as a topical skincare product, a limitation of its use is that it is not very stable and has poor solubility in water. A recent patent states substituting EGCG for theasinensin A "provides wrinkle-reducing or skin elasticity-enhancing benefits, and skin-brightening benefits".

Its atropisomer is theasinensin D.

== See also ==
- Theasinensin B
- Theasinensin C
- Theasinensin D
- Theasinensin E
- Theasinensin F
- Theasinensin G
