= C44H34O21 =

The molecular formula C_{44}H_{34}O_{21} may refer to:

- Theasinensin F
- Theasinensin G
