= C44H34O22 =

The molecular formula C_{44}H_{34}O_{22} may refer to:

- Theasinensin A
- Theasinensin D
