= Sharon K. Inouye =

American geriatrician

- Born: Culver City, California, USA
- Spouse: Stephen Lewis Helfand (m. 1983)

Academic background
- Education: BA, English literature, 1977, Pomona College; MD, 1981, UCSF Medical Center; MPH, 1989, Yale University

Academic work
- Institutions: Harvard Medical School; Yale University

Sharon Kiyomi Inouye is an American geriatrician. She is the Director of the Aging Brain Center at the Hinda and Arthur Marcus Institute for Aging Research, as well as a professor of medicine at the Harvard Medical School and Beth Israel Deaconess Medical Center. Her career has focused on maintaining healthy brain aging, preventing delirium and functional decline, and optimizing healthcare for older adults. Her recent work has focused on healthy longevity and combating ageism.

== Early life and education ==
Inouye was born to parents Lily Ann and Mitsuo Inouye in Culver City, California, the second of four children. She attended Pomona College for her undergraduate degree where she majored in English literature before studying medicine at the UCSF Medical Center, matriculating there as the youngest of her class. She completed her internal medicine residency as UCSF and Beth Israel Deaconess Medical Center (Harvard). As a senior resident in internal medicine at Moffitt Hospital in 1983, she married neurobiologist Stephen Lewis Helfand.

== Career ==
Upon completing her medical degree, Inouye completed a post-doctoral research fellowship in general medicine at Stanford with Dr. Harold Sox prior to completing the Robert Wood Johnson Clinical Scholars Program at Yale with Drs. Alvan Feinstein and Ralph Horwitz, where she completed an MPH degree in 1989. She joined the faculty at Yale University from 1985 to 2005. As a professor at Yale, she focused on translating clinical investigation from its theoretical basis to practical applications that will improve clinical care and quality of life for older persons. In the 1990s, she focused her research on preventing delirium amongst the elderly in hospitals. As such, she developed the Confusion Assessment Method as a new tool for the identification of delirium in 1990, now the most widely used tool for identification of delirium worldwide. In 1999, she published a landmark study in the New England Journal of Medicine demonstrating a 40% reduction in delirium using a multi-component non-pharmacologic program targeted at delirium risk factors. These strategies, which included orientation, early mobilization, providing nutrition and hydration, and enhancing sleep without medication using warm milk and backrubs, were encapsulated in the Hospital Elder Life Program (HELP). Yale-New Haven Hospital adopted her prevention methods such as warm milk and backrubs as a routine method. She also developed the Hospitals Elder Life Program (HELP) to prevent delirium in hospitalized patients. By 2002, Inouye was serving as Director of the Aging Brain Center at the Hinda and Arthur Marcus Institute for Aging Research and was the Milton and Shirley F. Levy Family Chair at Yale. As a result of her research, she was elected a member of the American Society for Clinical Investigation. Inouye was then awarded the 2003 Ewald W. Busse Research Award in Biomedical Sciences, the 2005 Leonard Tow Humanism in Medicine Award (Arnold P. Gold Foundation), and elected to the Society of Distinguished Teachers, Yale University School of Medicine, in 2005. Inouye was a tenured full professor at Yale, director of the Yale Mentored Clinical Research Scholars Program, co-director of the Yale Program on Aging, and Claude D. Pepper Older Americans Independence Center, director of the Yale Mentorship Program in Patient-Oriented Research on Aging, and director of Patient-Oriented Research for the Yale Investigative Medicine Program. She was also appointed co-director of the Yale Program on Aging and Yale's Claude D. Pepper Older Americans Independence Center.

Inouye left Yale University in 2005 to join the Beth Israel Deaconess Medical Center, Harvard Medical School, and Hebrew SeniorLife. In 2012, she was elected a member of the National Academy of Medicine. A few years later, Inouye was recognized by Thomson Reuters ScienceWatch as being amongst the world's most influential scientific minds for 2014. In October 2016, Inouye received a federal grant to help establish an interdisciplinary Network for Investigation of Delirium across the United States. Later that year, she also earned the M. Powell Lawton Award for her significant contributions in gerontology. In 2017, Inouye was named a 2017 Health and Aging Policy Fellow and an American Political Science Association Congressional Fellow.

During the COVID-19 pandemic, Inouye was selected as the Next Avenue 2020 Influencer in Aging, in part because of her work advocating for older adults during the COVID-19 pandemic.

She was named editor-in-chief of JAMA Internal Medicine effective July 1, 2023.
