= C20H14 =

The molecular formula C_{20}H_{14} (molar mass: 254.32 g/mol, exact mass: 254.1096 u) may refer to:

- 1,1'-Binaphthyl
- Triptycene
