= Theasinensin G =

Chemical compound

Identifiers
CAS Number	116403-61-3
3D model (JSmol)	Interactive image
ChemSpider	410677
PubChem CID	467316
- InChI: InChI=1S/C44H34O21/c45-16-5-23(47)20-12-34(64-43(60)14-1-27(51)37(56)28(52)2-14)41(62-32(20)7-16)19-10-26(50)25(49)9-18(19)36-22(11-31(55)39(58)40(36)59)42-35(13-21-24(48)6-17(46)8-33(21)63-42)65-44(61)15-3-29(53)38(57)30(54)4-15/h1-11,34-35,41-42,45-59H,12-13H2/t34-,35-,41-,42-/m1/s1 Key: JLFHSPGTENNODT-WLDZFSAMSA-N
- SMILES: c1c(O)c(O)c(O)cc1C(=O)O[C@@H]2Cc3c(O)cc(O)cc3O[C@@H]2c4cc(O)c(O)cc4c5c(O)c(O)c(O)cc5[C@H]6Oc7cc(O)cc(O)c7C[C@H]6OC(=O)c8cc(O)c(O)c(O)c8

Properties
Chemical formula	C_{44}H_{34}O_{21}
Molar mass	898.735 g·mol^{−1}
- Except where otherwise noted, data are given for materials in their standard state (at 25 °C [77 °F], 100 kPa). Infobox references

Theasinensin G is a polyphenol flavonoid found in oolong tea.

It is a deoxy derivative of theasinensin D and atropisomer of theasinensin F.
