= Theasinensin B =

Chemical compound

Identifiers
| CAS Number | 89064-32-4 |
| 3D model (JSmol) | Interactive image |
| ChEMBL | ChEMBL159548 |
| ChemSpider | 410676 |
| PubChem CID | 467315 |
- InChI: InChI=1S/C37H30O18/c38-12-3-18(40)14-7-24(46)35(53-25(14)5-12)16-8-22(44)31(48)33(50)28(16)29-17(9-23(45)32(49)34(29)51)36-27(10-15-19(41)4-13(39)6-26(15)54-36)55-37(52)11-1-20(42)30(47)21(43)2-11/h1-6,8-9,24,27,35-36,38-51H,7,10H2/t24-,27-,35-,36-/m1/s1 Key: CTVAVEOYQKVFFY-DUSGSIEYSA-N
- SMILES: C1C(C(OC2=CC(=CC(=C21)O)O)C3=CC(=C(C(=C3C4=C(C(=C(C=C4C5C(CC6=C(C=C(C=C6O5)O)O)OC(=O)C7=CC(=C(C(=C7)O)O)O)O)O)O)O)O)O)O

Properties
| Chemical formula | C_{37}H_{30}O_{18} |
| Molar mass | 762.629 g·mol^{−1} |
- Except where otherwise noted, data are given for materials in their standard state (at 25 °C [77 °F], 100 kPa). Infobox references

Theasinensin B is polyphenol flavonoid from black tea (Thea sinensis).

== See also ==
- Theasinensin A
- Theasinensin C
