= JAMA Internal Medicine =

- Discipline: Internal medicine
- Language: English
- Edited by: Sharon K. Inouye

Publication details
- Former name(s): A.M.A. Archives of Internal Medicine, Archives of Internal Medicine
- History: 1908–present
- Publisher: American Medical Association (United States)
- Frequency: Monthly
- Impact factor: 39.0 (2022)

Standard abbreviations
- ISO 4: JAMA Intern. Med.

Indexing
- ISSN: 2168-6106 (print); 2168-6114 (web)

Links
- Journal homepage

JAMA Internal Medicine is a monthly peer-reviewed medical journal published by the American Medical Association. It was established in 1908 as the Archives of Internal Medicine and obtained its current title in 2013. It covers all aspects of internal medicine, including cardiovascular disease, geriatrics, infectious disease, gastroenterology, endocrinology, allergy, and immunology. Sharon K. Inouye of Harvard Medical School and Beth Israel Deaconess Hospital became the journal editor-in-chief on July 1, 2023, succeeding Rita F. Redberg of the University of California, San Francisco.

According to Journal Citation Reports, the journal's 2022 impact factor is 39.0, ranking it 7th out of 168 journals in the category "Medicine, General & Internal".

== Naming history ==
JAMA Internal Medicine – Historical name changes
Title	Year	ISSN
JAMA Internal Medicine	2013–present	2168-6114
Archives of Internal Medicine	1960–2012	0003-9926
A.M.A. Archives of Internal Medicine	1950–1960	0888-2479
Archives of Internal Medicine (Chicago, Ill.: 1908)	1908–1950	0730-188X

== Abstracting and indexing ==
The journal is abstracted and indexed in Index Medicus/MEDLINE/PubMed.

== See also ==
- List of American Medical Association journals
