= Theabrownin =

Identifiers
CAS Number	330783-95-4

Properties
Chemical formula	Variable
Molar mass	Variable
- Except where otherwise noted, data are given for materials in their standard state (at 25 °C [77 °F], 100 kPa). Infobox references

Theabrownin is a polymeric chemical compound found in pu-erh tea that can attenuate hypercholesterolemia. During microbial fermentation, catechins and their gallate derivatives from green tea (like theaflavins (TF), thearubigins (TR)) get fermented into theabrownin.
