= European Delirium Association =

International medical association

The European Delirium Association was founded in 2006 in order to promote research, education and clinical practice in delirium. It serves as a forum to bring together interested researchers, practitioners and policy makers.

In 2006, the inaugural meeting brought together 50 delegates from the disciplines central to delirium including doctors, nurses, and psychologists working in geriatrics, psychiatry, palliative medicine, pediatrics, and neurology. The association has a broad remit, covering research, clinical practice, and promotion of better care through campaigning at local, national, and international levels. The annual scientific congress addresses a wide spectrum of issues including the latest developments in epidemiology, pathophysiology, phenomenology, treatment (including service models), and delirium advocacy.

In 2011, the European Delirium Association received the first Delirium Champion Award at the inaugural meeting of the American Delirium Society. Along with the American Delirium Society, the European Delirium Association has provided a framework for the interpretation of delirium diagnostic criteria.

The European Delirium Association provides research funding, and has been able to coordinate research across its network.

== Journals: Delirium and Delirium Communications ==
Together with the Australasian Delirium Association and American Delirium Society, European Delirium Association publishes two open access journals Delirium and Delirium Communications. Each organisation contributes to the editorial board, led by Alasdair MacLullich of the University of Edinburgh.

Delirium aims to increase understanding of delirium through the dissemination of original research with the potential to change clinical practice and policy for the ultimate benefit of patients and their families. It publishes the highest-quality research across the entire range of delirium-related studies.

Delirium Communications provides an avenue for publishing any scientifically robust research focusing on delirium. It is committed to publishing any delirium-related work that meets methodological and ethical standards. Its ambition is to accelerate the scientific understanding of delirium by bringing together delirium-related research currently published in disparate fields and journals, increasing the volume of delirium-related publications whatever the editorial interest outside the field, and widely disseminate open access delirium research findings and related data.

== Annual Scientific Congress ==
- 2006 Alkmaar, Netherlands
- 2007 Limerick, Ireland
- 2008 Helsinki, Finland
- 2009 Leeds, UK
- 2010 Amsterdam, Netherlands
- 2011 Umea, Sweden
- 2012 Bielefeld, Germany
- 2013 Leuven, Belgium
- 2014 Cremona, Italy
- 2015 London, UK
- 2016 Vilamoura, Portugal
- 2017 Oslo, Norway
- 2018 Utrecht, Netherlands
- 2019 Edinburgh, UK
- 2020 no meeting
- 2021 Barcelona, Spain
- 2022 Milan, Italy
- 2023 Birmingham, UK
- 2024 The Hague, Netherlands
- 2025 Hamburg, Germany (12-14 November)
