= Knipholone =

- Atropisomerism of knipholone

Names
- Preferred IUPAC name 1-(3-Acetyl-2,6-dihydroxy-4-methoxyphenyl)-4,5-dihydroxy-2-methylanthracene-9,10-dione

Identifiers
CAS Number	94450-08-5
3D model (JSmol)	Interactive image
ChEBI	CHEBI:6141
ChEMBL	ChEMBL514883
ChemSpider	391095
KEGG	C10365
PubChem CID	442753
CompTox Dashboard (EPA)	DTXSID10331938
- InChI: InChI=1S/C24H18O8/c1-9-7-13(27)20-21(22(29)11-5-4-6-12(26)18(11)24(20)31)16(9)19-14(28)8-15(32-3)17(10(2)25)23(19)30/h4-8,26-28,30H,1-3H3 Key: DUENHQWYLVQDQK-UHFFFAOYSA-N; InChI=1/C24H18O8/c1-9-7-13(27)20-21(22(29)11-5-4-6-12(26)18(11)24(20)31)16(9)19-14(28)8-15(32-3)17(10(2)25)23(19)30/h4-8,26-28,30H,1-3H3 Key: DUENHQWYLVQDQK-UHFFFAOYAR
- SMILES: COc1cc(O)c(c(O)c1C(C)=O)-c1c(C)cc(O)c2C(=O)c3c(O)cccc3C(=O)c12

Properties
Chemical formula	C_{25}H_{20}O_{8}
Molar mass	448.42 g/mol
- Except where otherwise noted, data are given for materials in their standard state (at 25 °C [77 °F], 100 kPa). Infobox references

Knipholone is a chemical compound found in the roots of Kniphofia foliosa of the family Asphodelaceae.
