= Telenzepine =

Chemical compound

Clinical data
- ATC code: None

Identifiers
- IUPAC name: 1-methyl-10-[2-(4-methylpiperazin-1-yl)acetyl]-5H-thieno[3,4-b][1,5]benzodiazepin-4-one
- CAS Number: 80880-90-6
- PubChem CID: 5387
- ChemSpider: 5194
- UNII: 0990EG3K10
- ChEMBL: ChEMBL253978
- CompTox Dashboard (EPA): DTXSID5045209

Chemical and physical data
- Formula: C_{19}H_{22}N_{4}O_{2}S
- Molar mass: 370.47 g·mol^{−1}
- 3D model (JSmol): Interactive image
- SMILES: C1CN(C)CCN1CC(=O)N2c3ccccc3NC(=O)c4csc(C)c42
- InChI: InChI=1S/C19H22N4O2S/c1-13-18-14(12-26-13)19(25)20-15-5-3-4-6-16(15)23(18)17(24)11-22-9-7-21(2)8-10-22/h3-6,12H,7-11H2,1-2H3,(H,20,25); Key:VSWPGAIWKHPTKX-UHFFFAOYSA-N

Telenzepine is a thienobenzodiazepine acting as selective M_{1} antimuscarinic. It is used in the treatment of peptic ulcers. Telenzepine is atropisomeric, in other words the molecule has a stereogenic C–N-axis. In neutral aqueous solution it displays a half-life for racemization of the order of 1000 years. The enantiomers have been resolved. The activity is related to the (+)-isomer which is about 500-fold more active than the (–)-isomer at muscarinic receptors in the rat cerebral cortex.

== See also ==
- Pirenzepine
