= Rita F. Redberg =

American cardiologist

- Born: December 27, 1956 (age 69); Brooklyn, New York, US

Academic background
- Education: BS, biology, Cornell University; MS, Health Policy and Administration, 1981, London School of Economics; MD, 1982, Perelman School of Medicine at the University of Pennsylvania

Academic work
- Institutions: University of California, San Francisco

Rita Fran Redberg (born December 27, 1956) is an American cardiologist and was the editor-in-chief of JAMA Internal Medicine (JAMA IM) from 2009 to 2023.

== Early life and education ==
Redberg was born on December 27, 1956 in Brooklyn, New York. She attended James Madison High School and was among the first students enrolled in City-as-School, an experiential learning high school that allowed students to have educational experiences all over New York City. During the program, she chose to work at a hospital, shadowing doctors. Following high school, Redberg majored in biology at Cornell University.

Following Cornell, Redberg completed her medical degree at Perelman School of Medicine at the University of Pennsylvania while simultaneously earning her Master of Science degree in Health Policy and Administration at the London School of Economics. She then accepted a residency and fellowship position at the Columbia University Medical Center, Mount Sinai Hospital, and the Cardiovascular Research Institute at the University of California, San Francisco (UCSF) Medical Center.

== Career ==
Upon completing her residency and fellowship, Redberg accepted a faculty position at the University of California, San Francisco (UCSF) in 1991, where she is currently a professor of clinical medicine. During the 1990s, she was appointed the director of women's cardiovascular services at the UCSF National Center of Excellence in Women's Health and was a founding member of the American Heart Association's Women in Cardiology Committee. In 2003, Redberg spent a year in Washington, D.C. as a Robert Wood Johnson Health Policy Fellow. As part of her fellowship, she began working as a health policy staff member for Senator Orrin Hatch whom she helped research and develop legislation related to the Food and Drug Administration and lead the implementation of the Medicare Modernization Act.

When Redberg returned from her Fellowship, she focused much of her subsequent research on technology assessment and the evidence base and regulatory pathway for medical devices. She has since had an extensive history of government service, including serving on the Medicare Payment Advisory Commission (MedPAC) from 2012 to 2018 as a commissioner, and the Medicare Evidence and Development Coverage Advisory Committee (MEDCAC) from 2003 to 2006 as a member and 2012 to 2017 as its chairperson.

In 2009, she was appointed the editor-in-chief of JAMA IM (formerly the Archives of Internal Medicine). While in this role, she led the journal's prioritization of health care reform and spearheaded the "Less is More" series, which highlighted the overuse of low-value care and encouraged the adoption of more evidence-based and high-value medical procedures.

Redberg frequently speaks with reporters of major media outlets on topics related to medical devices and health policy and has been featured in The New York Times, The Wall Street Journal, on National Public Radio and The Today Show, and in the George Polk Award-winning nominated Netflix documentary The Bleeding Edge.

In 2017, she was elected to the National Academy of Medicine for her "outstanding professional achievement and commitment to service in the medical sciences, health care and public health."

Redberg has been listed as a "Top Doctor" by San Francisco Magazine every year since 2015. In 2016, Redberg was awarded the Robert Wood Johnson Foundation (RWJF) Health Policy Fellows Lifetime Achievement Award. During the COVID-19 pandemic, Redberg was appointed the Araxe Vilensky Endowed Chair for her "long history and proven record of research." A few months later, she also received the 2021 Perelman School of Medicine Distinguished Graduate Award from the University of Pennsylvania for her "outstanding service to society and the profession of medicine." Redberg currently serves on Penn's Center for Health Incentives and Behavioral Economics' (CHIBE) external advisory board.

== Selected publications ==
- Lalani, C; Kunwar, EM; Kinard, M; Dhruva, SS; Redberg, RF (2021). "Reporting of Death in US Food and Drug Administration Medical Device Adverse Event Reports in Categories Other Than Death". JAMA Intern Med. 181 (9): 1217–1223. doi:10.1001/jamainternmed.2021.3942. PMC 8314174. PMID 34309624.
- Redberg, RF; Dhruva, SS (2019). "Moving From Substantial Equivalence to Substantial Improvement for 510(k) Devices". JAMA. 322 (10): 927–928. doi:10.1001/jama.2019.10191. PMID 31355877..
- Meier, L; Wang, EY; Tomes, M; Redberg, RF (2020). "Miscategorization of Deaths in the US Food and Drug Administration Adverse Events Database". JAMA Intern Med. 180 (1): 147–148. doi:10.1001/jamainternmed.2019.4030. PMC 6784806. PMID 31589249.
- Jones, LC; Dhruva, SS; Redberg, RF (2018). "Assessment of Clinical Trial Evidence for High-Risk Cardiovascular Devices Approved Under the Food and Drug Administration Priority Review Program". JAMA Intern Med. 178 (10): 1418–1420. doi:10.1001/jamainternmed.2018.3649. PMC 6584255. PMID 30178044.
- Brown, DL; Redberg, RF (Nov 2017). "Last nail in the coffin for PCI in stable angina?". Lancet. 391: 3–4. doi:10.1016/S0140-6736(17)32757-5. PMID 29103657.
- Judson, TJ; Dhruva, SS; Redberg, RF (2019). "Evaluation of technologies approved for supplemental payments in the United States". BMJ. 365 l2190. doi:10.1136/bmj.l2190. PMC 6890455. PMID 31209124.
- You Can be a Woman Cardiologist (1996)
