= Theasinensin E =

Chemical compound

Identifiers
CAS Number	116348-81-3
3D model (JSmol)	Interactive image
ChEBI	CHEBI:136611
ChEMBL	ChEMBL264042
ChemSpider	410678
PubChem CID	467317
- InChI: InChI=1S/C30H26O14/c31-9-1-15(33)11-5-19(37)29(43-21(11)3-9)13-7-17(35)25(39)27(41)23(13)24-14(8-18(36)26(40)28(24)42)30-20(38)6-12-16(34)2-10(32)4-22(12)44-30/h1-4,7-8,19-20,29-42H,5-6H2/t19-,20-,29-,30-/m1/s1 Key: JPBGHWKYWUEIOT-XYTTVBAYSA-N
- SMILES: C1C(C(OC2=CC(=CC(=C21)O)O)C3=CC(=C(C(=C3C4=C(C(=C(C=C4C5C(CC6=C(C=C(C=C6O5)O)O)O)O)O)O)O)O)O)O
- Except where otherwise noted, data are given for materials in their standard state (at 25 °C [77 °F], 100 kPa). Infobox references

Theasinensin E is polyphenol flavonoid found in oolong tea. It's an atropisomer of theasinensin C.
