= 1,1'-Binaphthyl =

Names
- Preferred IUPAC name 1,1′-Binaphthalene
- Other names 1-Naphthalen-1-ylnaphthalene

Identifiers
CAS Number	604-53-5
3D model (JSmol)	Interactive image
ChemSpider	11296
ECHA InfoCard	100.009.155
EC Number	210-070-6
PubChem CID	11789
UNII	T87T28S609
CompTox Dashboard (EPA)	DTXSID70870671
- InChI: InChI=1S/C20H14/c1-3-11-17-15(7-1)9-5-13-19(17)20-14-6-10-16-8-2-4-12-18(16)20/h1-14H Key: ZDZHCHYQNPQSGG-UHFFFAOYSA-N
- SMILES: C1=CC=C2C(=C1)C=CC=C2C3=CC=CC4=CC=CC=C43

Properties
Chemical formula	C_{20}H_{14}
Molar mass	254.332 g·mol^{−1}
Appearance	Colorless solid
Density	1.299 g/cm^{3}
Melting point	160 °C (320 °F; 433 K)
- Except where otherwise noted, data are given for materials in their standard state (at 25 °C [77 °F], 100 kPa). Infobox references

1,1'-Binaphthyl is an organic compound with the formula (C_{10}H_{7})_{2}. It is one of the dimers of naphthalene (or literally: dimers of naphthyl). A colorless solid, it has attracted some attention because the atropisomers can be isolated due to hindered rotation between the two naphthyl subunits. The halflife of the racemization is 14.5 min. at 50 °C. Substituted derivatives of this parent species, e.g. binaphthol, exhibit much higher barriers to racemization.
