= Karl Freudenberg =

German chemist (1886–1983)

Karl Johann Freudenberg ForMemRS (29 January 1886 Weinheim, Baden – 3 April 1983 Weinheim) was a German chemist who did early seminal work on the absolute configurations to carbohydrates, terpenes, and steroids, and on the structure of cellulose (first correct formula published, 1928) and other polysaccharides, and on the nature, structure, and biosynthesis of lignin. The Research Institute for the Chemistry of Wood and Polysaccharides at the University of Heidelberg was created for him in the mid to late 1930s, and he led this until 1969.

== Life ==
Freudenberg studied at Bonn University in 1904, and the University of Berlin from 1907 to 1910, where he studied with Emil Fischer. In July 1910, he married Doris Nieden; they had five children. His grandfather Carl Johann Freudenberg was a tanner and businessman, who in 1849, with Heinrich Christian Heintze, founded Freudenberg Group.

Freudenberg was a professor at University of Freiburg in 1921, at Heidelberg University in 1922, at Karlsruhe University from 1926 to 1956, and director of the Research Institute at the University of Heidelberg, noted above, from 1936 to 1969.

== Works ==
- Chemie der natürlichen Gerbstoffe (1920) [studies on tannins and their relations to catechins]
- Stereochemie (1933)
- Tannin, Cellulose, Lignin (1933)
