= Confusion Assessment Method =

The Confusion Assessment Method (CAM) is a diagnostic tool developed to allow physicians and nurses to identify delirium in the healthcare setting. It was designed to be brief (less than 5 minutes to perform) and based on criteria from the third edition-revision of the Diagnostic and Statistical Manual of Mental Disorders (DSM-III-R). The CAM rates four diagnostic features, including acute onset and fluctuating course, inattention, disorganized thinking, and altered level of consciousness. The CAM requires that a brief cognitive test is performed before it is completed. It has been translated into more than 20 languages and adapted for use across multiple settings.

== Elements of Score ==
The CAM consists of a short and long form. The CAM short form assesses four features: 1. acute onset or fluctuating course, 2. inattention, 3. disorganized thinking, and 4. altered level of consciousness. The CAM-long form includes the short-form features and adds disorientation, memory impairment, perceptual disturbances, psychomotor agitation or retardation, and altered sleep-wake cycle. These features are based on the 9 features of delirium from DSM-III-R. Each feature is scored as present or absent. Delirium is considered present based on the CAM diagnostic algorithm: presence of (acute onset or fluctuating course -AND‐ inattention) ‐AND EITHER‐ (disorganized thinking or altered level of consciousness) (Table 1). Detailed training and scoring instructions are available here.

== Interpretation ==
In the original study, the 3-5-minute CAM assessment was validated against a >90 minute assessment by reference standard geriatric psychiatrists using DSM-III-R, and found to have a sensitivity and specificity of 94-100% and 90-95%, respectively, for identification of delirium. In a systematic review of 7 high quality studies involving >1000 patients, CAM was found to have a sensitivity of 94%, 95% CI 91-97%; and specificity of 89%, 95% CI 85-94%. A 2013 systematic review of 22 studies involving >2400 patients found a sensitivity of 82%, 95% CI 69-91%; and specificity of 99%, 95% CI 87-100%.

A large high-quality STARD-compliant diagnostic randomized controlled trial published in 2019 comparing the CAM with the 4AT delirium detection tool found that the CAM had lower sensitivity than the 4AT, with the two tools showing similar specificity. Though some studies show good performance of the CAM in research settings, large scale studies of detection of delirium in real-world clinical practice show that the CAM shows a lower sensitivity (as judged by positive score rates in relation to estimated delirium rates) of around 30-40%.

== Adaptations ==
The table below describes delirium assessment tools based on the CAM, their scoring, and available translations. Additional information (for example: administration and instrument validity) may be found here.

CONFUSION ASSESSMENT METHOD ADAPTATIONS
CAM and its Adaptations	Description	Scoring	Available Languages
CAM – Short^{Confusion Assessment Method – Short} All settings	A 4 question assessment of features including acute onset and fluctuating course, inattention, disorganized thinking, and altered level of consciousness.	Delirium scored as ‘present’ (1) or ‘absent’ (0) based on question responses. Positive scores are based on the CAM algorithm, presence of acute onset or fluctuating course and inattention, and either disorganized thinking or altered level of consciousness.	English, Arabic, Dutch, French, German, Italian, Polish, Portuguese, Spanish, Thai, Turkish
CAM – Long^{Confusion Assessment Method – Long} All settings	A 10 question assessment of features including acute onset and fluctuating course, inattention, disorganized thinking, altered level of consciousness, disturbances, psychomotor agitation and retardation, and altered sleep-walk cycle.	Delirium scored as ‘present’ (1) or ‘absent’ (0) based on question responses. Positive scores are based on the CAM algorithm, presence of acute onset or fluctuating course and inattention, and either disorganized thinking or altered level of consciousness.	English, Arabic, Dutch, French, German, Italian, Polish, Portuguese, Spanish, Thai, Turkish
CAM-S Short^{Confusion Assessment Method – Severity (Short)} All settings	A delirium severity rating scale based on the additive scoring of symptoms rated in the CAM short form (Confusion Assessment Method). The CAM-S is intended to be used in addition to the original CAM algorithm.	Rate each symptom of delirium listed in the instrument as absent (0), mild (1), or marked (2), except acute onset or fluctuating course which was rated as absent (0) or present (1). The severity score is created by an additive summary of the ratings ranging from 0–7. Higher scores indicate more severe delirium.	English
CAM-S Long^{Confusion Assessment Method – Severity (Long)} All settings	A delirium severity rating scale based on the additive scoring of symptoms rated in the CAM long form (Confusion Assessment Method). The CAM-S is intended to be used in addition to the original CAM algorithm.	Rate each symptom of delirium listed in the instrument as absent (0), mild (1), or marked (2), except acute onset or fluctuating course which was rated as absent (0) or present (1). The severity score is created by an additive summary of the ratings ranging from 0–19. Higher scores indicate more severe delirium.	English
FAM-CAM^{Family Confusion Assessment Method} All settings	The FAM‐CAM is an 11-item informant‐based screening instrument to heighten detection of delirium features by family members. It is designed to be used in conjunction with or confirmed by expert clinicians or trained assessors using the Confusion Assessment Method (CAM), and including further assessment and cognitive testing.	Each item pertains to a specific feature and is coded as positive or negative. The FAM‐CAM is considered positive according to the CAM diagnostic algorithm: presence of acute onset or fluctuating course –AND‐ inattention ‐AND EITHER‐ disorganized thinking or altered level of consciousness	English and Spanish
3D-CAM^{3-Minute Diagnostic Confusion Assessment Method} All settings	A 3-minute and rating scale that uses verbal responses and observations by the rater to rate the CAM diagnostic algorithm. The clinical version includes skip patterns that can shorten the instrument, while the research version is designed for systematic case-finding for delirium in a research setting and does not include skip patterns. Research and clinical versions exist.	Considered positive if 3 out of 4 features are present including acute onset or fluctuating course, inattention, and either disorganize thinking or altered level of consciousness.	English, Danish, and Italian (clinical version only)
UB-CAM^{Ultra-Brief Confusion Assessment Method} All settings	A two-step protocol with skip pattern involving a clinician-administered two-item interview (UB-2), followed, when positive, by a short interview (3D-CAM) and rating scale that uses verbal responses and observations by the rater to rate the Confusion Assessment Method (CAM) diagnostic algorithm. The following skip pattern is applied—as soon as one incorrect answer or positive patient symptom report or interview observation is positive, the remainder of the items in that CAM feature can be skipped.	Begin with 2-item interview. If the patient gets both items correct, the screen is negative for delirium. If one or both items are incorrect, then this is a positive screen, then move to 3D-CAM with skip pattern. Considered positive for delirium based on the CAM diagnostic algorithm: Presence of CAM Features 1 and 2, and either 3 or 4. Each of the 20 items pertains to a specific CAM feature and is coded either yes/no or correct/incorrect.	English
CAM-ICU^{Confusion Assessment Method for the ICU} ICU	An adaptation of the Confusion Assessment Method (CAM) to be usable by clinicians to screen for delirium in the intensive care unit setting, designed for nonverbal (intubated) patients. The CAM-ICU utilizes the CAM diagnostic algorithm. There are 4 core features including acute onset or fluctuating course, inattention, disorganized thinking, and altered level of consciousness rated with 8 items.	3 of the 4 features must be present for CAM-ICU to be considered positive, according to the original CAM algorithm. Items are rated absent/present base on specific thresholds.	English, Arabic, Chinese, Czech, Danish, Dutch, Egyptian, French, German, Greek, Hindi, Italian, Japanese, Korean, Malayalam, Marathi, Norwegian, Persian, Polish, Portuguese, Russian, Serbian, Spanish, Swedish, Thai, and Zulu
bCAM^{Brief Confusion Assessment Method} Emergency Department	A modification of the Confusion Assessment Method for the Intensive Care Unit (CAM‐ ICU) to quickly screen for delirium outside of the ICU. The bCAM utilizes the CAM diagnostic algorithm. The 4 core features rated with 7 items include acute onset or fluctuating course, inattention, altered level of consciousness, and disorganized thinking.	3 of the 4 features must be present for bCAM to be considered positive (1 and 2, and either 3 or 4), according to the original CAM algorithm. Items are rated absent/present. The bCAM scoring sheet is presented as a flow chart to determine delirium presence quickly.	English and Zambian (Bemba and Nyanja dialects available)
CAM-ED^{Confusion Assessment Method for the Emergency Department} Emergency Department	The CAM-ED uses a modified CAM algorithm to determine delirium in the Emergency Department. It differs from the CAM only in the presence of a scoring system (from 1 to 4) that allowed more flexibility in assigning the diagnosis of delirium (acute or fluctuating course to be a feature for "probable" delirium). The instrument requires use of the Mini‐Mental State Examination (MMSE). There are 4 core features including acute onset or fluctuating course, inattention, disorganized thinking, and altered level of consciousness rated with 10 items.	Delirium scored as ‘delirium’ (scoring 4/4), ‘probable’ (3/4), ‘possible’ (2/4), or ‘No’ (1/4) based on question responses; CAM is considered positive based on the CAM algorithm: presence of acute onset or fluctuating course –AND/OR- inattention -AND EITHER - disorganized thinking or altered level of consciousness.	English
mCAM-ED^{Modified Confusion Assessment Method for Emergency Department} Emergency Department	The mCAM-ED is based on the original CAM algorithm, modified to screening for inattention using the months of the year in reverse order from the Bedside Confusion Scale by nurses in the emergency department. If inattention is present, then proceed to the MSQ and The Comprehension Test, a subdomain for the Cognitive Test for Delirium. The four features assessed include acute onset or fluctuating course, inattention, disorganized thinking, and altered level of consciousness rated with 15 items.	To score inattention: Every omission (from months of the year in reverse order) is scored 1 point, a delay >30 seconds scored 1 additional point. Inattention was present with a score of >2. If inattention present, Mental Status Questionnaire (MSQ) is used to determine altered cognition; if >2 errors are made, then altered cognition is present. Disorganized thinking is tested with The Comprehension Test, present if >2 errors. Altered level of consciousness and fluctuating course are assessed using patient observation during the interview.	English and German
NH-CAM^{Nursing Home Confusion Assessment Methods} Nursing Home	The four CAM features were modified into the NH-CAM using 9 variables associated with the standard Minimum Data Set (MDS) Resident Assessment Protocol (RAP) (Items B5f, E3, B5a, B5b, B5c, B6, B5d, B5e, E5) for delirium screening of patients within 19 days after admission to the nursing home from hospitalization.	CAM is considered positive based on the CAM algorithm: presence of acute onset or fluctuating course –AND- inattention -AND EITHER- disorganized thinking or altered level of consciousness	English
