= 4AT =

Medical scale to test for delirium

The 4 'A's Test (4AT) is a bedside medical scale used to help determine if a person has positive signs for delirium. The 4AT also includes cognitive test items, making it suitable also for use as a rapid test for cognitive impairment. A 2025 study using large scale routine clinical data reported that 4AT scores were associated with dementia as well as delirium.

== Description ==
The 4AT is designed to be used as a delirium detection tool in general clinical settings, inpatient hospital settings outside of the Intensive Care Unit (ICU), or in the community. The 4AT is intended to be used by healthcare practitioners without the need for special training, and it takes around two minutes to complete. The test was first published online in 2011.

The 4AT has 32 published formal validation diagnostic test accuracy studies involving >6000 patients. It has been evaluated in several areas of practice including in the emergency department (ED), medical, surgical, community and palliative care settings. The 4AT is used internationally in both clinical practice and research. It is included in clinical guidelines, including the UK NICE Guidelines on Delirium, and policy documents. The 4AT is used as a tool for delirium and cognitive assessment in hip fracture registries.

Some evidence shows that the 4AT can be implemented at scale in real-world clinical practice and that it shows positive score rates at comparable levels to the expected delirium prevalence rates.

A 2022 two-center study in real-world clinical populations (total N=82,770) found that 4AT positive scores were aligned with expected delirium rates, and also were linked with important outcomes including 30-day mortality, one-year mortality, hospital length of stay, and days at home in the year following hospital admission. Notably, the 4AT was completed as part of usual care by a large number of different staff (mostly doctors and nurses) who had not received special training in use of the 4AT. This study therefore showed that the 4AT is feasible in large-scale practice and that it provides real-time delirium ascertainment with positive scores being linked to important short and longer-term outcomes.

== Parameters ==
Full 4AT scale
Parameters and scoring	Points
[1] Alertness This includes patients who may be markedly drowsy (eg. difficult to rouse and/or obviously sleepy during assessment) or agitated/hyperactive. Observe the patient. If asleep, attempt to wake with speech or a gentle touch on the shoulder. Ask the patient to state their name and address to assist rating.
Normal (fully alert, but not agitated, throughout assessment) Mild sleepiness for <10 seconds after waking, then normal Clearly abnormal	0 0 4
[2] AMT4 Age, date of birth, place (name of the hospital or building), current year.
No mistakes 1 mistake 2 or more mistakes/untestable	0 1 2
[3] Attention Ask the patient: "Please tell me the months of the year in backwards order, starting at December."To assist initial understanding one prompt of "what is the month before December?" is permitted.
Achieves 7 months or more correctly Starts but scores <7 months / refuses to start Untestable (cannot start because unwell, drowsy, inattentive)	0 1 2
[4] Acute change or fluctuating course Evidence of significant change or fluctuation in alertness, cognition, other mental function (eg. paranoia, hallucinations) arising over the last 2 weeks and still evident in the last 24hrs
No Yes	0 4
4AT TOTAL SCORE	
SCORING KEY 4 or above: possible delirium +/- cognitive impairment 1-3: possible cognitive impairment 0: delirium or severe cognitive impairment unlikely (Delirium still possible if [4] information incomplete)

The 4AT has 4 parameters:

1. Alertness
2. Abbreviated mental test-4 (AMT4)
3. Attention (months backwards test)
4. Acute change or fluctuating course

The score range is 0–12, with scores of 4 or more suggesting possible delirium. Scores of 1-3 suggest possible cognitive impairment.

There are several indications of a positive score of 4 or more. Parameters [1] and [4] can each individually trigger a positive score. The rationale is that both altered arousal and acute change in mental functioning are highly specific indicators of delirium.

Parameters [2] and [3] provide embedded cognitive testing. These parameters can also yield an overall positive score for the 4AT: if [2] scores as 2 or more mistakes or if the patient is untestable, and with [3] the patient is untestable, then the combined score is 4, suggesting possible delirium. The rationale for allowing untestability to trigger an outcome of possible delirium is that many people with delirium are too drowsy or inattentive to undergo cognitive testing or interview. These scoring options additionally allow the 4AT to be completed in patients who are unable to provide verbal responses.

== Psychometric properties ==
A review of data to December 2019 involving 17 studies reported a pooled sensitivity of 88% and a pooled specificity of 88% for delirium diagnosis. Since then, several additional validation studies have been published.

A large, high quality (STARD-compliant) diagnostic randomized controlled trial comparing the 4AT and the Confusion Assessment Method (CAM) found that the 4AT had higher sensitivity and similar specificity to the CAM.

== Recommended use ==
The 4AT is intended to be used to assess for delirium on initial presentation with the patient, in transitions of care, in periods of high risk such as post-operatively and when delirium is suspected. Using the 4AT multiple times per day for monitoring for new onset delirium for prolonged periods (weeks or more) is not recommended because of the burden of repeated cognitive testing on patients and staff. However, it can be used 1-2 times per day for specified periods, e.g. perioperatively. Additionally the 4AT is validated for monitoring for recovery from active delirium. The 4AT is thus considered an episodic delirium test rather than a monitoring test. Use of the 4AT multiple times per day may be associated with lower compliance and overall performance because of the burden on staff and patients caused by performing several face to face interviews and cognitive testing per day.

Shorter, largely observational tests such as the National Early Warning Score - 2 (NEWS2), RADAR, the Delirium Observation Scale (DOS), the (Single Question in Delirium (SQiD)), or the Nursing Delirium Screening Scale (Nu-DESC) are more suitable for ongoing routine monitoring for new delirium after admission to hospital (or in long-term care settings). A positive score in those tests generally then requires a more detailed assessment with a tool like the 4AT. This is an area of delirium practice which requires additional research.

The 4AT is one of several other delirium assessment tools in the literature. Each varies in its intended use (research, severity grading, very brief screening, etc.), completion time, need for training, and psychometric characteristics.

== Languages ==
The 4AT has to date been translated into German, French, Italian, Spanish, Portuguese, Danish, Finnish, Swedish, Turkish, Arabic, Norwegian, Thai, Cantonese, Putonghua, Russian, Korean, Japanese, and Icelandic.
