= Thienobenzodiazepine =

Class of chemical compounds

General structure of thienobenzodiazepines. Core is highlighted by black and color. Grey depicts accessory functional groups. It's Molecular Weight is 200.26 g/mol

Thienobenzodiazepine is a heterocyclic compound containing a diazepine ring fused to a thiophene ring and a benzene ring. Thienobenzodiazepine forms the central core of pharmaceutical drugs including atypical antipsychotic olanzapine (Zyprexa) and antimuscarinic telenzepine.
