= Theasinensin D =

Chemical compound

Identifiers
CAS Number	116403-62-4
3D model (JSmol)	Interactive image
ChemSpider	390965
PubChem CID	442543
CompTox Dashboard (EPA)	DTXSID50331871
- InChI: InChI=1S/C44H34O22/c45-15-5-21(47)17-11-31(65-43(61)13-1-23(49)35(55)24(50)2-13)41(63-29(17)7-15)19-9-27(53)37(57)39(59)33(19)34-20(10-28(54)38(58)40(34)60)42-32(12-18-22(48)6-16(46)8-30(18)64-42)66-44(62)14-3-25(51)36(56)26(52)4-14/h1-10,31-32,41-42,45-60H,11-12H2/t31-,32-,41-,42-/m1/s1 Key: YUULFXAQUWEYNP-GXAWFILRSA-N
- SMILES: C1[C@H]([C@H](OC2=CC(=CC(=C21)O)O)C3=CC(=C(C(=C3C4=C(C(=C(C=C4[C@@H]5[C@@H](CC6=C(C=C(C=C6O5)O)O)OC(=O)C7=CC(=C(C(=C7)O)O)O)O)O)O)O)O)O)OC(=O)C8=CC(=C(C(=C8)O)O)O
- Except where otherwise noted, data are given for materials in their standard state (at 25 °C [77 °F], 100 kPa). Infobox references

Theasinensin D is polyphenol flavonoid found in oolong tea. It's an atropisomer of theasinensin A.
