= Theasinensin F =

Chemical compound

Identifiers
CAS Number	116329-55-6
3D model (JSmol)	Interactive image
ChEMBL	ChEMBL159692
ChemSpider	410677
PubChem CID	467316
- InChI: InChI=1S/C44H34O21/c45-16-5-23(47)20-12-34(64-43(60)14-1-27(51)37(56)28(52)2-14)41(62-32(20)7-16)19-10-26(50)25(49)9-18(19)36-22(11-31(55)39(58)40(36)59)42-35(13-21-24(48)6-17(46)8-33(21)63-42)65-44(61)15-3-29(53)38(57)30(54)4-15/h1-11,34-35,41-42,45-59H,12-13H2/t34-,35-,41-,42-/m1/s1 Key: JLFHSPGTENNODT-WLDZFSAMSA-N
- SMILES: C1C(C(OC2=CC(=CC(=C21)O)O)C3=CC(=C(C=C3C4=C(C(=C(C=C4C5C(CC6=C(C=C(C=C6O5)O)O)OC(=O)C7=CC(=C(C(=C7)O)O)O)O)O)O)O)O)OC(=O)C8=CC(=C(C(=C8)O)O)O

Properties
Chemical formula	C_{44}H_{34}O_{21}
Molar mass	898.735 g·mol^{−1}
- Except where otherwise noted, data are given for materials in their standard state (at 25 °C [77 °F], 100 kPa). Infobox references

Theasinensin F is polyphenol flavonoid found in oolong tea.

It's a deoxy derivative of theasinensin A.
