= Delirium =

Severe confusion that develops quickly, and often fluctuates in intensity

- Specialty: Intensive care medicine, neurology, psychiatry, geriatrics
- Symptoms: Agitation, confusion, drowsiness, hallucinations, delusions, memory problems
- Usual onset: Any age, but more often in people aged 65 and above
- Duration: Days to weeks, sometimes months (several hours when caused by anticholinergic medications, like dicycloverine, diphenhydramine, doxylamine, promethazine)
- Types: Hyperactive, hypoactive, mixed level of activity
- Causes: Medications, substance abuse, poorly controlled blood sugar, vitamin deficiencies, neurotoxins, fever, and unknown causes.
- Risk factors: Infection, chronic health problems, certain medications, neurological problems, sleep deprivation, surgery, hospitalization at an intensive care unit
- Differential diagnosis: Dementia
- Treatment: Treating underlying cause, symptomatic management with medication
- Medication: Depending on the underlying cause

Delirium (formerly acute confusional state, an ambiguous term that is now discouraged) is a specific state of acute confusion attributable to the direct physiological consequence of a medical condition, effects of a psychoactive substance, or multiple causes, which usually develops over the course of hours to days. As a syndrome, delirium presents with disturbances in attention, awareness, and higher-order cognition. People with delirium may experience other neuropsychiatric disturbances including changes in psychomotor activity (e.g., hyperactive, hypoactive, or mixed level of activity), disrupted sleep–wake cycle, emotional disturbances, disturbances of consciousness, or altered state of consciousness, as well as perceptual disturbances (e.g., hallucinations and delusions), although these features are not required for diagnosis.

Diagnostically, delirium encompasses both the syndrome of acute confusion and its underlying organic process, known as an acute encephalopathy. The cause of delirium may be either a disease process inside the brain or a process outside the brain that nonetheless affects the brain. Delirium may be the result of an underlying medical condition (e.g., infection or hypoxia), side effect of a medication such as diphenhydramine, promethazine, and dicycloverine, substance intoxication (e.g., opioids or hallucinogenic deliriants), substance withdrawal (e.g., alcohol or sedatives), or from multiple factors affecting one's overall health (e.g., malnutrition, pain, etc.). In contrast, the emotional and behavioral features due to primary psychiatric disorders (e.g., as in schizophrenia, bipolar disorder) do not meet the diagnostic criteria for 'delirium'.

Delirium may be difficult to diagnose without first establishing a person's usual mental function or 'cognitive baseline'. Delirium may be confused with multiple psychiatric disorders or chronic organic brain syndromes because of many overlapping signs and symptoms in common with dementia, depression, psychosis, etc. Delirium may occur in persons with existing mental illness, baseline intellectual disability, or dementia, entirely unrelated to any of these conditions. Delirium is often confused with schizophrenia, psychosis, organic brain syndromes, and more, because of similar signs and symptoms of these disorders.

Treatment of delirium requires identifying and managing the underlying causes, managing delirium symptoms, and reducing the risk of complications. In some cases, temporary or symptomatic treatments are used to comfort the person or to allow other care (e.g., preventing people from pulling out a breathing tube). Antipsychotics are not supported for the treatment or prevention of delirium among those who are in hospital; however, they may be used in cases where a person has distressing experiences such as hallucinations or if the person poses a danger to themselves or others. When delirium is caused by alcohol or sedative-hypnotic withdrawal, benzodiazepines are typically used as a treatment. There is evidence that the risk of delirium in hospitalized people can be reduced by non-pharmacological care bundles (see Delirium § Prevention). According to the text of DSM-5-TR, although delirium affects only 1–2% of the overall population, 18–35% of adults presenting to the hospital will have delirium, and delirium will occur in 29–65% of people who are hospitalized. Delirium occurs in 11–51% of older adults after surgery, in 81% of those in the ICU, and in 20–22% of individuals in nursing homes or post-acute care settings. Among those requiring critical care, delirium is a risk factor for death within the next year.

Because of the confusion caused by similar signs and symptoms of delirium with other neuropsychiatric disorders like schizophrenia and psychosis, treating delirium can be difficult, and might even cause death of the patient due to being treated with the wrong medications.

== Definition ==
In common usage, delirium can refer to drowsiness, agitation, disorientation, or hallucinations. In medical terminology, however, the core features of delirium include an acute disturbance in attention, awareness, and global cognition.

Although slight differences exist between the definitions of delirium in the DSM-5-TR and ICD-10, the core features are broadly the same. In 2022, the American Psychiatric Association released the fifth edition text revision of the DSM (DSM-5-TR) with the following criteria for diagnosis:

- A. Disturbance in attention and awareness. This is a required symptom and involves easy distraction, inability to maintain attentional focus, and varying levels of alertness.
- B. Onset is acute (from hours to days), representing a change from baseline mentation and often with fluctuations throughout the day
- C. At least one additional cognitive disturbance (in memory, orientation, language, visuospatial ability, or perception)
- D. The disturbances (criteria A and C) are not better explained by another neurocognitive disorder
- E. There is evidence that the disturbances above are a "direct physiological consequence" of another medical condition, substance intoxication or withdrawal, toxin, or various combinations of causes

== Signs and symptoms ==
Delirium exists across a range of arousal levels, either as a state between normal wakefulness/alertness and coma (hypoactive) or as a state of heightened psychophysiological arousal (hyperactive). It can also alternate between the two (mixed level of activity). While requiring an acute disturbance in attention, awareness, and cognition, the syndrome of delirium encompasses a broad range of additional neuropsychiatric disturbances.

- Inattention: A disturbance in attention is required for delirium diagnosis. This may present as an impaired ability to direct, focus, sustain, or shift attention.
- Memory impairment: The memory impairment that occurs in delirium is often due to an inability to encode new information, largely as a result of having impaired attention. Older memories already in storage are retained without need of concentration, so previously formed long-term memories (i.e., those formed before the onset of delirium) are usually preserved in all but the most severe cases of delirium, though recall of such information may be impaired due to global impairment in cognition.
- Disorientation: A person may be disoriented to self, place, or time. Additionally, a person may be 'disoriented to situation' and not recognize their environment or appreciate what is going on around them.
- Disorganized thinking: Disorganized thinking is usually noticed with speech that makes limited sense with apparent irrelevancies, and can involve poverty of speech, loose associations, perseveration, tangentiality, and other signs of a formal thought disorder.
- Language disturbances: Anomic aphasia, paraphasia, impaired comprehension, agraphia, and word-finding difficulties all involve impairment of linguistic information processing.
- Sleep/wake disturbances: Sleep disturbances in delirium reflect disruption in both sleep/wake and circadian rhythm regulation, typically characterized by fragmented sleep or even sleep-wake cycle reversal (i.e., active at night, sleeping during the day), including as an early sign preceding the onset of delirium.
- Psychotic and other erroneous beliefs: Symptoms of psychosis include suspiciousness, overvalued ideation and frank delusions. Delusions are typically poorly formed and less stereotyped than in schizophrenia or Alzheimer's disease. They usually relate to persecutory themes of impending danger or threat in the immediate environment (e.g., being poisoned by nurses).
- Perceptual disturbances: These can include illusions, which involve the misperception of real stimuli in the environment, or hallucinations, which involve the perception of stimuli that do not exist.
- Mood lability: Distortions to perceived or communicated emotional states as well as fluctuating emotional states can manifest in delirium (e.g., rapid changes between terror, sadness, joking, fear, anger, and frustration).
- Motor activity changes: Delirium has been commonly classified into psychomotor subtypes of hypoactive, hyperactive, and mixed level of activity, though studies are inconsistent as to their prevalence. Hypoactive cases are prone to non-detection or misdiagnosis as depression. A range of studies suggests that motor subtypes differ regarding underlying pathophysiology, treatment needs, functional prognosis, and risk of mortality, though inconsistent subtype definitions and poorer detection of hypoactive subtypes may influence the interpretation of these findings. The notion of unifying hypoactive and hyperactive states under the construct of delirium is commonly attributed to Lipowski.
  - Hyperactive symptoms include hyper-vigilance, restlessness, fast or loud speech, irritability, combativeness, impatience, swearing, singing, laughing, uncooperativeness, euphoria, anger, wandering, easy startling, fast motor responses, distractibility, tangentiality, nightmares, and persistent thoughts (hyperactive sub-typing is defined with at least three of the above).
  - Hypoactive symptoms include decreased alertness, sparse or slow speech, lethargy, slowed movements, staring, and apathy.
  - Mixed level of activity describes instances of delirium where activity level is either normal or fluctuating between hyperactive and hypoactive.

== Causes ==
Delirium arises through the interaction of a number of predisposing and precipitating factors.

Individuals with multiple and/or significant predisposing factors are at high risk for an episode of delirium with a single and/or mild precipitating factor. Conversely, delirium may only result in low risk individuals if they experience a serious or multiple precipitating factors. These factors can change over time, thus an individual's risk of delirium is modifiable (see Delirium § Prevention).

=== Predisposing factors ===
Important predisposing factors include the following:

- 65 or more years of age
- Cognitive impairment/dementia
- Physical morbidity (e.g., biventricular failure, cancer, cerebrovascular disease)
- Psychiatric morbidity (e.g., depression)
- Sensory impairment (i.e., vision and hearing)
- Functional dependence (e.g., requiring assistance for self-care or mobility)
- Dehydration/malnutrition
- Substance use disorder, especially alcohol use disorder and anticholinergic abuse.

=== Precipitating factors ===
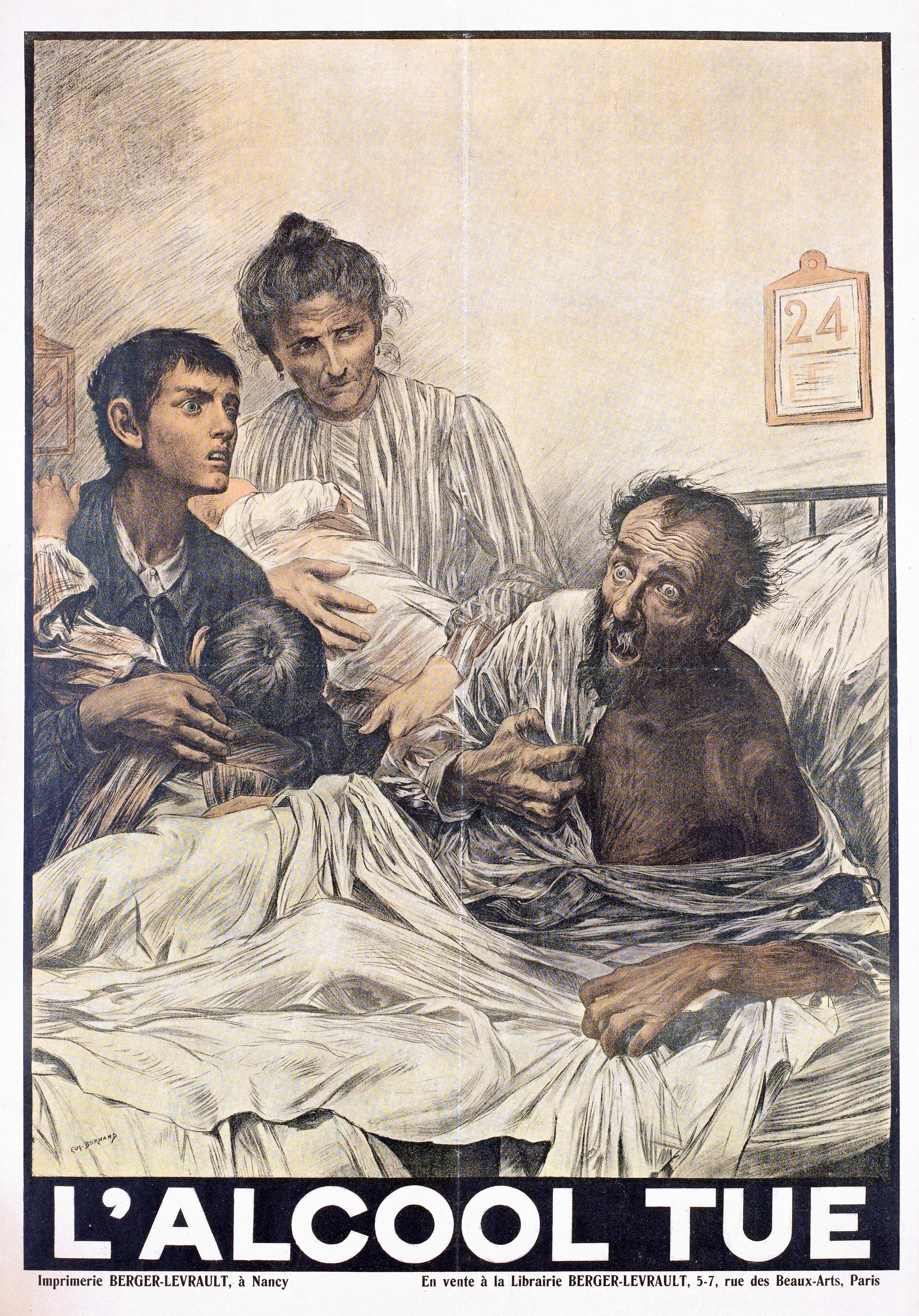
Acute confusional state caused by alcohol withdrawal, also known as delirium tremens

Any serious, acute biological factor that affects neurotransmitter, neuroendocrine, or neuroinflammatory pathways can precipitate an episode of delirium in a vulnerable brain. Certain elements of the clinical environment have also been associated with the risk of developing delirium. Some of the most common precipitating factors are listed below:

- Prolonged sleep restriction or deprivation
- Environmental, psychophysiological stress (as found in acute care settings)
  - Inadequately controlled pain
  - Immobilization, use of physical restraints
  - Urinary retention, use of bladder catheter
  - Emotional stress
  - Severe constipation/fecal impaction
- Medications and other drugs, causing substance-induced delirium. This type of delirium is separate from the delirium in elderly and older people above 65 years of age, and is characterized by shorter duration (usually several hours), and the symptoms are highly influenced by the type of drug and amount consumed.
  - Sedatives (benzodiazepines, opioids), anticholinergics, dopaminergics, corticosteroids, polypharmacy
  - General anesthetic
  - Substance intoxication or withdrawal
- Primary neurologic conditions
  - Severe drop in blood pressure, relative to the person's normal blood pressure (orthostatic hypotension) resulting in inadequate blood flow to the brain (cerebral hypoperfusion)
  - Stroke/transient ischemic attack(TIA)
  - Intracranial bleeding
  - Meningitis, encephalitis
- Concurrent illness
  - Infections – especially respiratory (e.g. pneumonia, COVID-19) and urinary tract infections
  - Iatrogenic complications
  - Hypoxia, hypercapnea, anemia
  - Poor nutritional status, dehydration, electrolyte imbalances, hypoglycemia
  - Shock, heart attacks, heart failure
  - Metabolic derangements (e.g. SIADH, Addison's disease, hyperthyroidism)
  - Chronic/terminal illness (e.g. cancer)
  - Post-traumatic event (e.g. fall, fracture)
  - Mercury poisoning (e.g. erethism)
- Major surgery (e.g. cardiac, orthopedic, vascular surgery)

== Pathophysiology ==
The pathophysiology of delirium is still not well understood, despite extensive research.

=== Animal models ===
The lack of animal models that are relevant to delirium has left many key questions in delirium pathophysiology unanswered. Earliest rodent models of delirium used atropine (a muscarinic acetylcholine receptor blocker) to induce cognitive and electroencephalography (EEG) changes similar to delirium, and other anticholinergic drugs, such as biperiden and hyoscine, have produced similar effects. Along with clinical studies using various drugs with anticholinergic activity, these models have contributed to a "cholinergic deficiency hypothesis" of delirium.

Profound systemic inflammation occurring during sepsis is also known to cause delirium (often termed sepsis-associated encephalopathy). Animal models used to study the interactions between prior degenerative disease and overlying systemic inflammation have shown that even mild systemic inflammation causes acute and transient deficits in working memory among diseased animals. Prior dementia or age-associated cognitive impairment is the primary predisposing factor for clinical delirium and "prior pathology" as defined by these new animal models may consist of synaptic loss, abnormal network connectivity, and "primed microglia" brain macrophages stimulated by prior neurodegenerative disease and aging to amplify subsequent inflammatory responses in the central nervous system (CNS).

=== Cerebrospinal fluid ===
Studies of cerebrospinal fluid (CSF) in delirium are difficult to perform. Apart from the general difficulty of recruiting participants who are often unable to give consent, the inherently invasive nature of CSF sampling makes such research particularly challenging. However, a few studies have managed to sample CSF from persons undergoing spinal anesthesia for elective or emergency surgery.

A 2018 systematic review showed that, broadly, delirium may be associated with neurotransmitter imbalance (namely serotonin and dopamine signaling), reversible fall in somatostatin, and increased cortisol. The leading "neuroinflammatory hypothesis" (where neurodegenerative disease and aging leads the brain to respond to peripheral inflammation with an exaggerated CNS inflammatory response) has been described, but current evidence is still conflicting and fails to concretely support this hypothesis.

=== Neuroimaging ===
Neuroimaging provides an important avenue to explore the mechanisms that are responsible for delirium. Despite progress in the development of magnetic resonance imaging (MRI), the large variety in imaging-based findings has limited our understanding of the changes in the brain that may be linked to delirium. Some challenges associated with imaging people diagnosed with delirium include participant recruitment and inadequate consideration of important confounding factors such as history of dementia and/or depression, which are known to be associated with overlapping changes in the brain also observed on MRI.

Evidence for changes in structural and functional markers include: changes in white-matter integrity (white matter lesions), decreases in brain volume (likely as a result of tissue atrophy), abnormal functional connectivity of brain regions responsible for normal processing of executive function, sensory processing, attention, emotional regulation, memory, and orientation, differences in autoregulation of the vascular vessels in the brain, reduction in cerebral blood flow and possible changes in brain metabolism (including cerebral tissue oxygenation and glucose hypometabolism). Altogether, these changes in MRI-based measurements invite further investigation of the mechanisms that may underlie delirium, as a potential avenue to improve clinical management of people with this condition.

=== Neurophysiology ===
Electroencephalography (EEG) allows for continuous capture of cortical activity in the brain, and is useful in understanding real-time physiologic changes during delirium. Since the 1950s, delirium has been known to be associated with slowing of resting-state EEG rhythms, with abnormally decreased background alpha power and increased theta and delta frequency activity.

From such evidence, a 2018 systematic review proposed a conceptual model that delirium results when insults/stressors trigger a breakdown of brain network dynamics in individuals with low brain resilience (i.e. people who already have underlying problems of low neural connectivity and/or low neuroplasticity like those with Alzheimer's disease).

=== Neuropathology ===
Only a handful of studies exist where there has been an attempt to correlate delirium with pathological findings at autopsy. One research study has been reported on 7 people who died during ICU admission. Each case was admitted with a range of primary pathologies, but all had acute respiratory distress syndrome and/or septic shock contributing to the delirium, 6 showed evidence of low brain perfusion and diffuse vascular injury, and 5 showed hippocampal involvement. A case-control study showed that 9 delirium cases showed higher expression of HLA-DR and CD68 (markers of microglial activation), IL-6 (cytokines pro-inflammatory and anti-inflammatory activities) and GFAP (marker of astrocyte activity) than age-matched controls; this supports a neuroinflammatory cause to delirium, but the conclusions are limited by methodological issues.

A 2017 retrospective study correlating autopsy data with mini–mental state examination (MMSE) scores from 987 brain donors found that delirium combined with a pathological process of dementia accelerated MMSE score decline more than either individual process.

== Diagnosis ==
The DSM-5-TR criteria are often the standard for diagnosing delirium clinically. However, early recognition of delirium's features using screening instruments, along with taking a careful history, can help in making a diagnosis of delirium. A diagnosis of delirium generally requires knowledge of a person's baseline level of cognitive function. This is especially important for treating people who have neurocognitive or neurodevelopmental disorders, whose baseline mental status may be mistaken as delirium.

=== General settings ===
Guidelines recommend that delirium should be diagnosed consistently when present. Much evidence reveals that in most centers delirium is greatly under-diagnosed. A systematic review of large scale routine data studies reporting data on delirium detection tools showed important variations in tool completion rates and tool positive score rates. Some tools, even if completed at high rates, showed delirium positive score rates that are much lower than the expected delirium occurrence level, suggesting low sensitivity in practice.

There is evidence that delirium detection and coding rates can show improvements in response to guidelines and education; for example, whole country data in England and Scotland (sample size 7.7M people per year) show that there were large increases (3–4 fold) in delirium coding between 2012 and 2020. Delirium detection in general acute care settings can be assisted by the use of validated delirium screening tools. Many such tools have been published, and they differ in a variety of characteristics (e.g., duration, complexity, and need for training). It is also important to ensure that a given tool has been validated for the setting where it is being used.

Examples of tools in use in clinical practice include:

- Confusion Assessment Method (CAM), including variants such as the 3-Minute Diagnostic Interview for the CAM (3D-CAM) and brief CAM (bCAM)
- Delirium Observation Screening Scale (DOS)
- Nursing Delirium Screening Scale (Nu-DESC)
- Recognizing Acute Delirium As part of your Routine (RADAR)
- 4AT (4 A's Test)
- Delirium Diagnostic Tool-Provisional (DDT-Pro), also for subsyndromal delirium

=== Intensive care unit ===
People who are in the ICU are at greater risk of delirium, and ICU delirium may lead to prolonged ventilation, longer stays in the hospital, increased stress on family and caregivers, and an increased chance of death. In the ICU, international guidelines recommend that every person admitted gets checked for delirium every day (usually twice or more a day) using a validated clinical tool. Key elements of detecting delirium in the ICU are whether a person can pay attention during a listening task and follow simple commands. The two most widely used are the Confusion Assessment Method for the ICU (CAM-ICU) and the Intensive Care Delirium Screening Checklist (ICDSC). Translations of these tools exist in over 20 languages and are used ICUs globally with instructional videos and implementation tips available. For children in need of intensive care there are validated clinical tools adjusted according to age. The recommended tools are preschool and pediatric Confusion Assessment Methods for the ICU (ps/pCAM-ICU) or the Cornell Assessment for Pediatric Delirium (CAPD) as the most valid and reliable delirium monitoring tools in critically ill children or adolescents.

More emphasis is placed on regular screening over the choice of tool used. This, coupled with proper documentation and informed awareness by the healthcare team, can affect clinical outcomes. Without using one of these tools, 75% of ICU delirium can be missed by the healthcare team, leaving the person without any likely interventions to help reduce the duration of delirium.

Evidence from systematic reviews and meta-analyses indicates that multicomponent non-pharmacological care bundles are effective in reducing the incidence and duration of delirium among patients in intensive care units (ICUs). These interventions are also associated with decreased duration of mechanical ventilation in ventilated patients, shortened hospital length of stay, lower rates of complications, and enhanced patient satisfaction with care. Multicomponent care bundles represent a promising evidence-based strategy for delirium prevention and management in critically ill patients. In clinical practice, successful implementation requires multidisciplinary coordination involving nurses, physicians, and family members to deliver concise, individualized interventions tailored to patient-specific risk factors.

The ABCDEF bundle (also referred to as the A2F bundle) represents an evidence-based, multicomponent intervention designed to coordinate and align multidisciplinary care in the intensive care unit (ICU). It places particular emphasis on delirium assessment, prevention, and management as an integral element within the broader framework of patient care, encompassing optimal pain and sedation management, mechanical ventilation strategies, and early mobilization protocols.

What are the components of the A2F bundle?

- A

Assess, Prevent, and Manage Pain

- B

Both Spontaneous Awakening Trials & Spontaneous Breathing Trials

- C

Choice of Analgesia and Sedation

- D

Delirium: Assess, Prevent and Manage

- E

Early Mobility and Exercise

- F

Family Engagement and Empowerment

=== Differential diagnosis ===
There are conditions that might have similar clinical presentations to those seen in delirium. These include dementia, depression, psychosis, catatonia, and other conditions that affect cognitive function.

- Dementia: This group of disorders is acquired (non-congenital) with usually irreversible cognitive and psychosocial functional decline. Dementia usually results from an identifiable degenerative brain disease (e.g., Alzheimer's disease or Huntington's disease), requires chronic impairment (versus acute onset in delirium), and is typically not associated with changes in level of consciousness. Dementia is different from delirium in that dementia lasts long-term while delirium lasts short-term.
- Depression: Similar symptoms exist between depression and delirium (especially the hypoactive subtype). Gathering a history from other caregivers can clarify baseline mentation.
- Psychosis: In general, people with primary psychosis have intact cognitive function; however, primary psychosis can mimic delirium when it presents with disorganized thoughts and mood dysregulation. This is particularly true in the condition known as delirious mania.
- Other mental illnesses: Some mental illnesses, such as a manic episode of bipolar disorder, depersonalization disorder, or other dissociative conditions, can present with features similar to that of delirium. Such condition, however, would not qualify for a diagnosis of delirium per DSM-5-TR criterion D (i.e., fluctuating cognitive symptoms occurring as part of a primary mental disorder are results of the said mental disorder itself), while physical disorders (e.g., infections, hypoxia, etc.) can precipitate delirium as a mental side-effect/symptom.

== Prevention ==
Treating delirium that is already established is challenging and for this reason, preventing delirium before it begins is ideal. Prevention approaches include screening to identify people who are at risk, and medication-based and non-medication based (non-pharmacological) treatments.

An estimated 30–40% of all cases of delirium could be prevented in cognitively at-risk populations, and high rates of delirium reflect negatively on the quality of care. Episodes of delirium can be prevented by identifying hospitalized people at risk of the condition. This includes individuals over age 65, with a cognitive impairment, undergoing major surgery, or with severe illness. Routine delirium screening is recommended in such populations. A meta-analysis found that a personalized approach to prevention combining several interventions decreased rates of delirium by 27% among the elderly.

In 1999, Sharon K. Inouye at Yale University, founded the Hospital Elder Life Program (HELP) which has since become recognized as a proven model for preventing delirium. HELP prevents delirium among the elderly through active participation and engagement with these individuals. There are two working parts to this program, medical professionals such as a trained nurse, and volunteers, who are overseen by the nurse. The volunteer program equips each trainee with the adequate basic geriatric knowledge and interpersonal skills to interact with patients. Volunteers perform the range of motion exercises, cognitive stimulation, and general conversation with elderly patients who are staying in the hospital. Alternative effective delirium prevention programs have been developed, some of which do not require volunteers.

Prevention efforts often fall on caregivers. Caregivers often have a lot expected of them and this is where socioeconomic status plays a role in prevention. If prevention requires constant mental stimulation and daily exercise, this takes time out of the caregiver's day. Depending on socioeconomic classes this may be valuable time that would be used working to support the family. This leads to a disproportionate number of individuals who experience delirium being from marginalized identities. Programs such as the Hospital Elder Life Program can attempt to combat these societal issues by providing additional support and education about delirium that may not otherwise be accessible.

=== Non-pharmacological ===
Delirium may be prevented and treated by using non-pharmacologic approaches focused on risk factors, such as constipation, dehydration, low oxygen levels, immobility, visual or hearing impairment, sleep disturbance, functional decline, and by removing or minimizing problematic medications. Ensuring a therapeutic environment (e.g., individualized care, clear communication, adequate reorientation and lighting during daytime, promoting uninterrupted sleep hygiene with minimal noise and light at night, minimizing room relocation, having familiar objects like family pictures, providing earplugs, and providing adequate nutrition, pain control, and assistance toward early mobilization) may also aid in preventing delirium. Research into pharmacologic prevention and treatment is weak and insufficient to make proper recommendations.

=== Pharmacological ===
Melatonin and other pharmacological agents have been studied for delirium prevention, but evidence is conflicting. Avoidance or cautious use of benzodiazepines has been recommended for reducing the risk of delirium in critically ill individuals. It is unclear if the medication donepezil, a cholinesterase inhibitor, reduces delirium following surgery. There is also no clear evidence to suggest that citicoline, methylprednisolone, or antipsychotic medications prevent delirium. A review of intravenous versus inhalational maintenance of anaesthesia for postoperative cognitive outcomes in elderly people undergoing non-cardiac surgery showed little or no difference in postoperative delirium according to the type of anaesthetic maintenance agents in five studies (321 participants). The authors of this review were uncertain whether maintenance of anaesthesia with propofol-based total intravenous anaesthesia (TIVA) or with inhalational agents can affect the incidence rate of postoperative delirium.

Interventions for preventing delirium in long-term care or hospital

The current evidence suggests that software-based interventions to identify medications that could contribute to delirium risk and recommend a pharmacist's medication review probably reduces incidence of delirium in older adults in long-term care. The benefits of hydration reminders and education on risk factors and care homes' solutions for reducing delirium is still uncertain.

For inpatients in a hospital setting, numerous approaches have been suggested to prevent episodes of delirium including targeting risk factors such as sleep deprivation, mobility problems, dehydration, and impairments to a person's sensory system. Often a 'multicomponent' approach by an interdisciplinary team of health care professionals is suggested for people in the hospital at risk of delirium, and there is some evidence that this may decrease to incidence of delirium by up to 43% and may reduce the length of time that the person is hospitalized.

== Treatment ==
Most often, delirium is reversible; however, people with delirium require treatment for the underlying cause(s), often to prevent injury and other poor outcomes directly related to delirium.

Treatment of delirium requires attention to multiple domains including the following:

- Identify and treat the underlying medical disorder or cause(s)
- Addressing any other possible predisposing and precipitating factors that might be disrupting brain function
- Optimize physiology and conditions for brain recovery (e.g., oxygenation, hydration, nutrition, electrolytes, metabolites, medication review)
- Detect and manage distress and behavioral disturbances (e.g., pain control)
- Maintaining mobility
- Provide rehabilitation through cognitive engagement and mobilization
- Communicate effectively with the person experiencing delirium and their carers or caregivers
- Provide adequate follow-up including consideration of possible dementia and post-traumatic stress.

=== Multidomain interventions ===
These interventions are the first steps in managing acute delirium, and there are many overlaps with delirium preventative strategies. In addition to treating immediate life-threatening causes of delirium (e.g., low O_{2}, low blood pressure, low glucose, dehydration), interventions include optimizing the hospital environment by reducing ambient noise, providing proper lighting, offering pain relief, promoting healthy sleep-wake cycles, and minimizing room changes. Although multicomponent care and comprehensive geriatric care are more specialized for a person experiencing delirium, several studies have been unable to find evidence showing they reduce the duration of delirium.

Family, friends, and other caregivers can offer frequent reassurance, tactile and verbal orientation, cognitive stimulation (e.g. regular visits, familiar objects, clocks, calendars, etc.), and means to stay engaged (e.g. making hearing aids and eyeglasses readily available). Sometimes verbal and non-verbal deescalation techniques may be required to offer reassurances and calm the person experiencing delirium. Restraints should rarely be used as an intervention for delirium. The use of restraints has been recognized as a risk factor for injury and aggravating symptoms, especially in older hospitalized people with delirium. The only cases where restraints should sparingly be used during delirium is in the protection of life-sustaining interventions, such as endotracheal tubes.

Another approached called the "T-A-DA (tolerate, anticipate, don't agitate) method" can be an effective management technique for older people with delirium, where abnormal behaviors (including hallucinations and delusions) are tolerated and unchallenged, as long as caregiver safety and the safety of the person experiencing delirium is not threatened. Implementation of this model may require a designated area in the hospital. All unnecessary attachments are removed to anticipate for greater mobility, and agitation is prevented by avoiding excessive reorientation/questioning.

=== Medications ===
The use of medications for delirium is generally restricted to managing its distressing or dangerous neuropsychiatric disturbances. Short-term use (one week or less) of low-dose haloperidol is among the more common pharmacological approaches to delirium. Evidence for effectiveness of atypical antipsychotics (e.g. risperidone, olanzapine, ziprasidone, and quetiapine) is emerging, with the benefit for fewer side effects Use antipsychotic drugs with caution or not at all for people with conditions such as Parkinson's disease or dementia with Lewy bodies. Evidence for the effectiveness of medications (including antipsychotics and benzodiazepines) in treating delirium is weak.

Benzodiazepines can cause or worsen delirium, and there is no reliable evidence of efficacy for treating non-anxiety-related delirium. Similarly, people with dementia with Lewy bodies may have significant side effects with antipsychotics, and should either be treated with a none or small doses of benzodiazepines.

The antidepressant trazodone is occasionally used in the treatment of delirium, but it carries a risk of over-sedation, and its use has not been well studied.

For adults with delirium that are in the ICU, medications are used commonly to improve the symptoms. Dexmedetomidine may shorten the length of the delirium in adults who are critically ill, and rivastigmine is not suggested. There is emerging evidence that guanfacine can be helpful in reducing delirium, which may involve strengthening network connections in the prefrontal cortex.

For adults with delirium who are near the end of their life (on palliative care) high quality evidence to support or refute the use of most medications to treat delirium is not available. Low quality evidence indicates that the antipsychotic medications risperidone or haloperidol may make the delirium slightly worse in people who are terminally ill, when compared to a placebo treatment. There is also moderate to low quality evidence to suggest that haloperidol and risperidone may be associated with a slight increase in side effects, specifically extrapyramidal symptoms, if the person near the end of their life has delirium that is mild to moderate in severity.

== Prognosis ==
There is substantial evidence that delirium results in long-term poor outcomes in older persons admitted to hospital. This systematic review only included studies that looked for an independent effect of delirium (i.e., after accounting for other associations with poor outcomes, for example co-morbidity or illness severity).

In older persons admitted to hospital, individuals experiencing delirium are twice as likely to die than those who do not (meta-analysis of 12 studies). In the only prospective study conducted in the general population, older persons reporting delirium also showed higher mortality (60% increase). A large (N=82,770) two-centre study in unselected older emergency population found that delirium detected as part of normal care using the 4AT tool was strongly linked to 30-day mortality, hospital length of stay, and days at home in the year following the 4AT test date.

Institutionalization was also twice as likely after an admission with delirium (meta-analysis of seven studies). In a community-based population examining individuals after an episode of severe infection (though not specifically delirium), these persons acquired more functional limitations (i.e., required more assistance with their care needs) than those not experiencing infection. After an episode of delirium in the general population, functional dependence increased threefold.

The association between delirium and dementia is complex. The systematic review estimated a 13-fold increase in dementia after delirium (meta-analysis of two studies). However, it is difficult to be certain that this is accurate because the population admitted to hospital includes persons with undiagnosed dementia (i.e., the dementia was present before the delirium, rather than caused by it). In prospective studies, people hospitalised from any cause appear to be at greater risk of dementia and faster trajectories of cognitive decline, but these studies did not specifically look at delirium. In the only population-based prospective study of delirium, older persons had an eight-fold increase in dementia and faster cognitive decline. The same association is also evident in persons already diagnosed with Alzheimer's dementia.

Recent long-term studies showed that many people still meet criteria for delirium for a prolonged period after hospital discharge, with up to 21% of people showing persistent delirium at 6 months post-discharge.

=== Dementia in ICU survivors ===
Between 50% and 70% of people admitted to the ICU have permanent problems with brain dysfunction similar to those experienced by people with Alzheimer's or those with a traumatic brain injury, leaving many ICU survivors permanently disabled. This is a distressing personal and public health problem and continues to receive increasing attention in ongoing investigations.

The implications of such an "acquired dementia-like illness" can profoundly debilitate a person's livelihood level, often dismantling his/her life in practical ways like impairing one's ability to find a car in a parking lot, complete shopping lists, or perform job-related tasks done previously for years. The societal implications can be enormous when considering work-force issues related to the inability of wage-earners to work due to their own ICU stay or that of someone else they must care for.

== Epidemiology ==
The highest rates of delirium (often 50–75% of people) occur among those who are critically ill in the intensive care unit (ICU). This was historically referred to as "ICU psychosis" or "ICU syndrome"; however, these terms are now widely disfavored in relation to the operationalized term ICU delirium. Since the advent of validated and easy-to-implement delirium instruments for people admitted to the ICU such as the Confusion Assessment Method for the ICU (CAM-ICU) and the Intensive Care Delirium Screening Checklist (ICDSC), it has been recognized that most ICU delirium is hypoactive, and can easily be missed unless evaluated regularly. The causes of delirium depend on the underlying illnesses, new problems like sepsis and low oxygen levels, and the sedative and pain medicines that are nearly universally given to all people in the ICU p. Outside the ICU, on hospital wards and in nursing homes, the problem of delirium is also a very important medical problem, especially for older patients.

The most recent area of the hospital in which delirium is just beginning to be monitored routinely in many centers is the Emergency Department, where the prevalence of delirium among older adults is about 10%. A systematic review of delirium in general medical inpatients showed that estimates of delirium prevalence on admission ranged 10–31%. About 5–10% of older adults who are admitted to hospital develop a new episode of delirium while in hospital. Rates of delirium vary widely across general hospital wards. Estimates of the prevalence of delirium in nursing homes are between 10% and 45%.

== Society and culture ==
Delirium is one of the oldest forms of mental disorder known in medical history. The Roman author Aulus Cornelius Celsus used the term to describe mental disturbance from head trauma or fever in his work De Medicina. Sims (1995, p. 31) points out a "superb detailed and lengthy description" of delirium in "The Stroller's Tale" from Charles Dickens' The Pickwick Papers. Historically, delirium has also been noted for its cognitive sequelae. For instance, the English medical writer Philip Barrow noted in 1583 that if delirium (or "frensy") resolves, it may be followed by a loss of memory and reasoning power.

=== Costs ===
In the US, the cost of a hospital admission for people with delirium is estimated at between $16k and $64k, suggesting the national burden of delirium may range from $38 bn to $150 bn per year (2008 estimate). In the UK, the cost is estimated as £13k per admission.
