= Atropisomer =

Stereoisomerism due to hindered rotation

Atropisomers of 6,6'-dinitro-2,2'-diphenic acid were first experimentally described case, by Christie and Kenner (1922).

Atropisomers are a kind of stereoisomer arising because of hindered rotation about a single bond, where energy differences due to steric strain or other contributors create a barrier to rotation that is high enough to allow for isolation of individual rotamers. They occur naturally and are of occasional importance in pharmaceutical design. When the substituents are achiral, these conformers are enantiomers (atropoenantiomers), showing axial chirality; otherwise they are diastereomers (atropodiastereomers).

== Etymology and history ==
The word atropisomer (Greek: ἄτροπος, atropos, meaning "not to be turned") was coined in application to a theoretical concept by German biochemist Richard Kuhn for Karl Freudenberg's seminal Stereochemie volume in 1933. Atropisomerism was first experimentally detected in a tetra substituted biphenyl, a diacid, by George Christie and James Kenner in 1922. Michinori Ōki further refined the definition of atropisomers taking into account the temperature-dependence associated with the interconversion of conformers, specifying that atropisomers interconvert with a half-life of at least 1000 seconds at a given temperature, corresponding to an energy barrier of 93 kJ·mol^{−1} (22 kcal·mol^{−1}) at 300 K (27 °C).

== Energetics ==
The stability of individual atropisomers is conferred by the repulsive interactions that inhibit rotation. Both the steric bulk and, in principle, the length and rigidity of the bond connecting the two subunits contribute. Commonly, atropisomerism is studied by dynamic nuclear magnetic resonance spectroscopy, since atropisomerism is a form of fluxionality. Inferences from theory and results of reaction outcomes and yields also contribute.

Atropisomers exhibit axial chirality (planar chirality). When the barrier to racemization is high, as illustrated by the BINAP ligand class, the phenomenon becomes of practical value in asymmetric synthesis. Methaqualone, the anxiolytic and hypnotic-sedative, is a classical example of a drug molecule that exhibits the phenomenon of atropisomerism.

Most examples of atropisomerism focus on derivatives or analogues of biphenyl. Some acylic systems, such as amides and especially thioamides, also exhibit the phenomenon owing to the partial double bond character of the C-N bonds in these systems.

== Stereochemical assignment ==
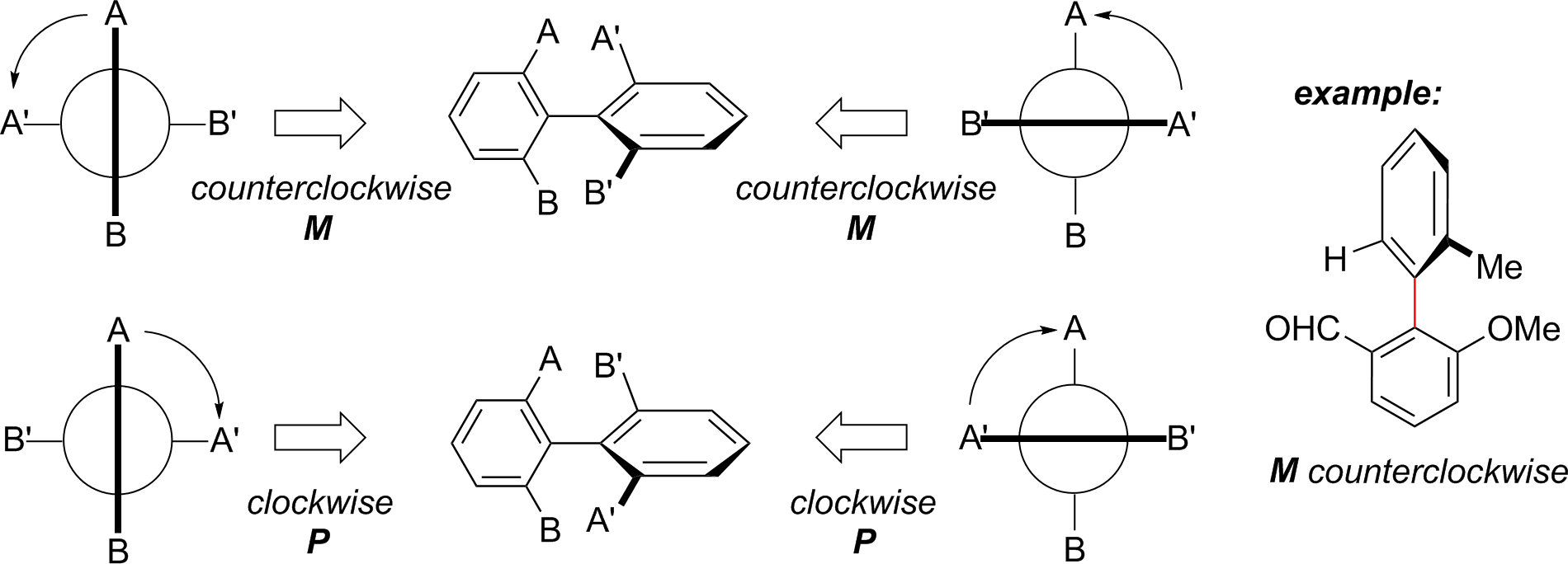
Determining stereochemistry in atropisomers using the helicity rule follows the priority: front substituent A > backward substituent A > front substituent B > backward substituent B

Determining the axial stereochemistry of biaryl atropisomers can be accomplished through the use of a Newman projection along the axis of hindered rotation. The ortho, and in some cases meta substituents are first assigned priority based on Cahn–Ingold–Prelog priority rules. One scheme of nomenclature is based on envisioning the helicity defined by these groups. Starting with the substituent of highest priority in the closest ring and moving along the shortest path to the substituent of highest priority in the other ring, the absolute configuration is assigned P or Δ for clockwise and M or Λ for counterclockwise. Alternately, all four groups can be ranked by Cahn–Ingold–Prelog priority rules, with overall priority given to the two groups on the "front" atom of the Newman projection. The two configurations determined in this way are termed R_{a} and S_{a}, in analogy to the traditional R/S for a traditional tetrahedral stereocenter.

== Synthesis ==
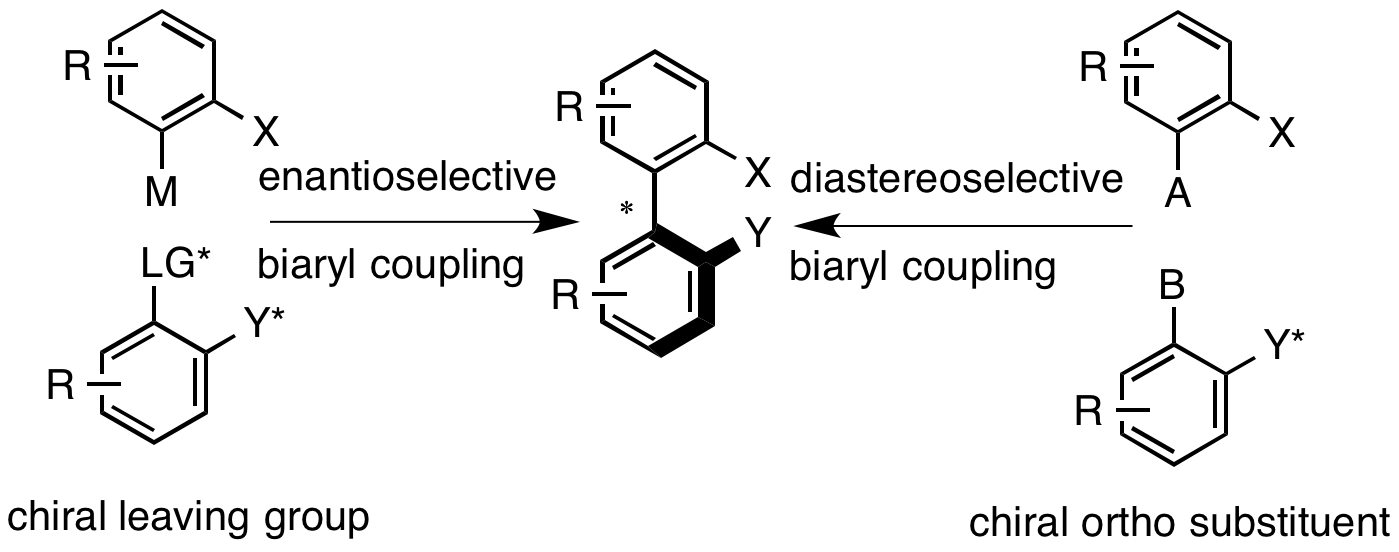
Two examples of atropisomer synthesis

Axially chiral biaryl compounds are prepared by coupling reactions, e.g., Ullmann coupling, Suzuki–Miyaura reaction, or palladium-catalyzed arylation of arenes. Subsequent to the synthesis, the racemic biaryl is resolved by classical methods. Diastereoselective coupling can be achieved through the use of a chiral bridge that links the two aryl groups or through the use of a chiral auxiliary at one of the positions proximal to axial bridge. Enantioselective coupling can be achieved through the use of a chiral leaving group on one of the biaryls or under oxidative conditions that utilize chiral amines to set the axial configuration.

Individual atropisomers can be isolated by seed-directed crystallization of racemates. Thus, 1,1'-Binaphthyl crystallizes from the melt as individual enantiomers.

== Scope ==
Relaying Asymmetry of Transient Atropisomers

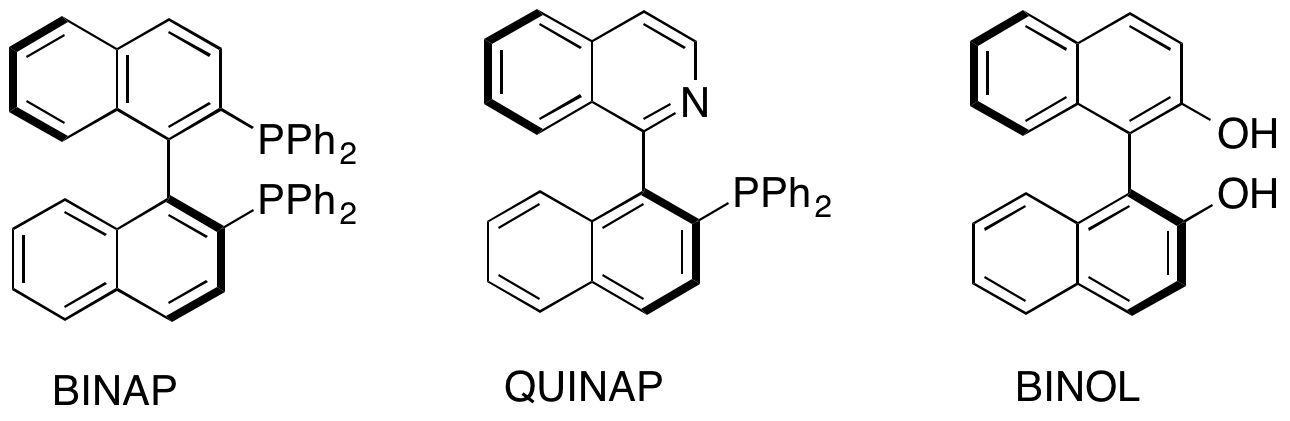
Structures of BINAP, BINOL, QUINAP

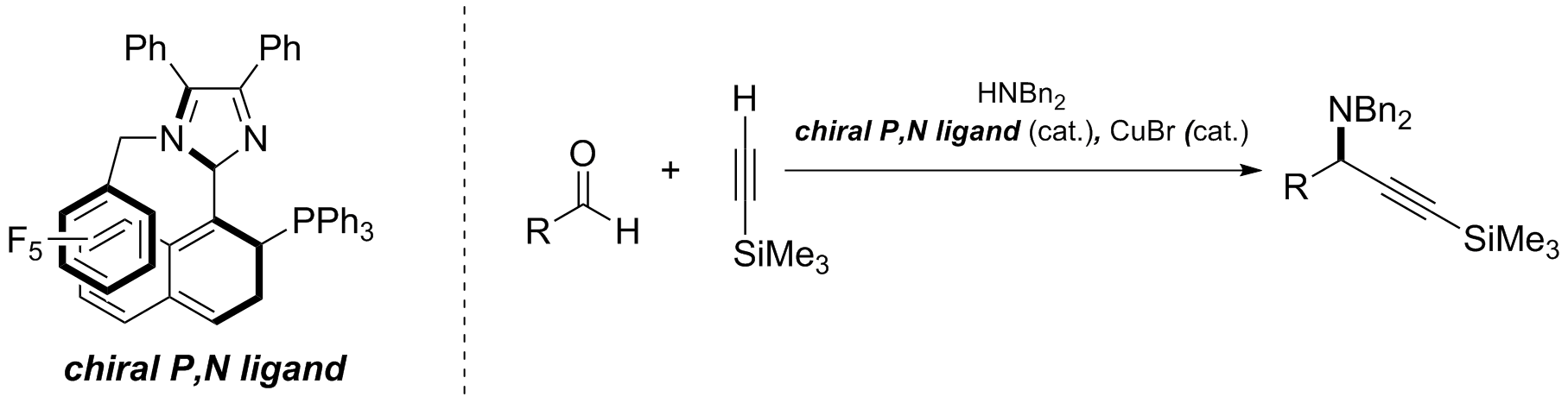
Example of use of P,N ligand for asymmetric catalysis

In one application the asymmetry in an atropisomer is transferred in a chemical reaction to a new stereocenter. The atropisomer is an iodoaryl compound synthesised starting from (S)-valine and exists as the (M,S) isomer and the (P,S) isomer. The interconversion barrier between the two is 24.3 kcal/mol (101.7 kJ/mol). The (M,S) isomer can be obtained exclusively from this mixture by recrystallisation from hexanes. The iodine group is homolytically removed to form an aryl radical by a tributyltin hydride/iethylboron/oxygen mixture as in the Barton–McCombie reaction. Although the hindered rotation is now removed in the aryl radical, the intramolecular reaction with the alkene is so much faster than is rotation of the carbon–nitrogen bond that the stereochemistry is preserved. In this way the (M,S) isomer yields the (S,S) dihydroindolone.

The most important class of atropisomers are biaryls such as diphenic acid, which is a derivative of biphenyl with a complete set of ortho substituents. Heteroaromatic analogues of the biphenyl compounds also exist, where hindered rotation occurs about a carbon-nitrogen or a nitrogen-nitrogen bond. Others are dimers of naphthalene derivatives such as 1,1'-bi-2-naphthol. In a similar way, aliphatic ring systems like cyclohexanes linked through a single bond may display atropisomerism provided that bulky substituents are present. The use of axially chiral biaryl compounds such as BINAP, QUINAP and BINOL, have been found to be useful in the area of asymmetric catalysis as chiral ligands.

Their ability to provide stereoinduction has led to use in metal catalyzed hydrogenation, epoxidation, addition, and allylic alkylation reactions. Other reactions that can be catalyzed by the use of chiral biaryl compounds are the Grignard reaction, Ullmann reaction, and the Suzuki reaction. A recent example in the area of chiral biaryl asymmetric catalysis employs a five-membered imidazole as part of the atropisomer scaffold. This specific phosphorus, nitrogen-ligand has been shown to perform enantioselective A^{3}-coupling.

== Natural products, drug design ==
Atropisomeric Natural Products
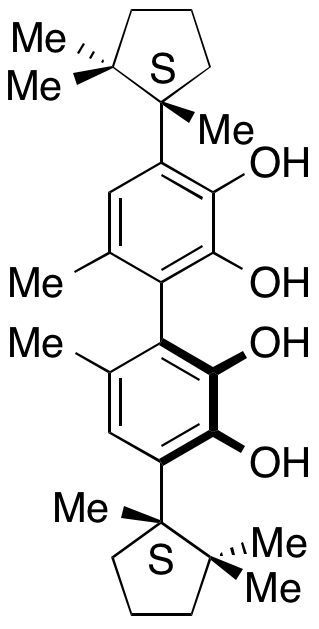
Mastigophorene A

Knipholone

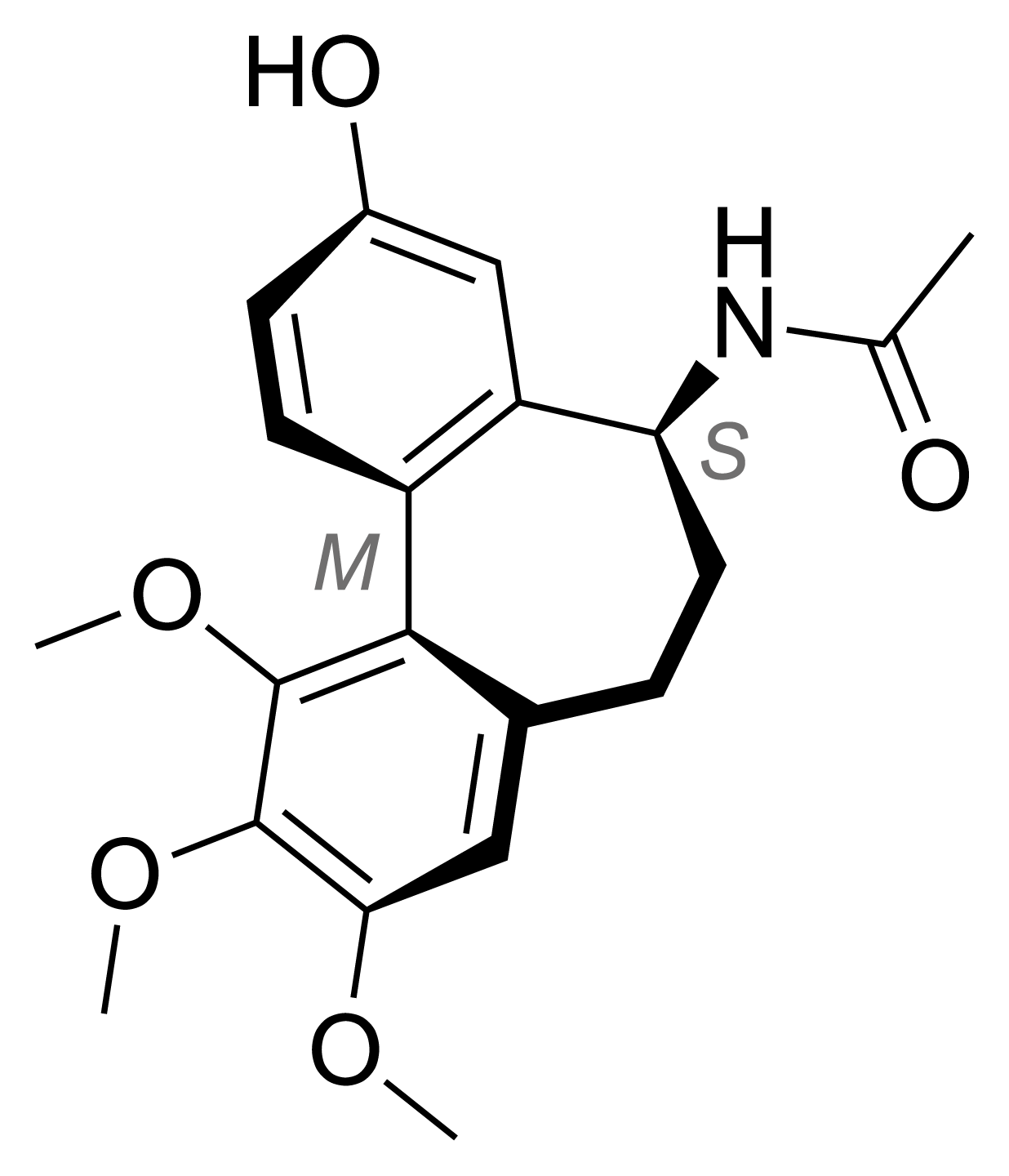
(–)-N-Acetylallocolchinol

Many atropisomers occur in nature, and some have applications to drug design. The natural product mastigophorene A has been found to aid in nerve growth. Other examples of naturally occurring atropisomers include vancomycin isolated from an Actinobacterium, and knipholone, which is found in the roots of Kniphofia foliosa of the family Asphodelaceae. The structure complexity in vancomycin is significant because it can bind with peptides due to the complexity of its stereochemistry, which includes multiple stereocenters, two chiral planes in its stereogenic biaryl axis. Knipholone, with its axial chirality, occurs in nature and has been shown to offer good antimalarial and antitumor activities particularly in the M form.

The use of atropisomeric drugs provides an additional way for drugs to have stereochemical variations and specificity in design. One example is (–)-N-acetylallocolchinol, a drug that was discovered to aid in chemotherapy cancer treatment.

Telenzepine is atropisomeric in the conformation of its central thienobenzodiazepine ring. The two enantiomers have been resolved, and it was found that the (+)-isomer which is about 500-fold more active than the (–)-isomer at muscarinic receptors in rat cerebral cortex. However, drug design is not always aided by atropisomerism. In some cases, making drugs from atropisomers is challenging because isomers may interconvert faster than expected. Atropisomers also might interact differently in the body, and as with other types of stereoisomers, it is important to examine these properties before administering drugs to patients.

== See also ==
- Dihedral angle
