= Muscarinic antagonist =

Drug that binds to but does not activate muscarinic cholinergic receptors

Muscarinic acetylcholine receptor antagonist
- Drug class
- Skeletal formula of scopolamine, a nonselective antagonist of the muscarinic receptors

Class identifiers
- Synonyms: Muscarinic acetylcholine receptor antagonist; Antimuscarinic; Anti-muscarinic; mACh antagonist; mAChR antagonist; Muscarinic antagonist; Antimuscarinic agent; Antimuscarinic drug; Antimuscarinic medication
- Use: Allergies, asthma, atrial fibrillation with bradycardia, motion sickness, Parkinson's disease, etc.
- ATC code: V
- Biological target: Muscarinic acetylcholine receptors

External links
- MeSH: D018727

Legal status

A muscarinic acetylcholine receptor antagonist, also simply known as a muscarinic antagonist or as an antimuscarinic agent, is a type of anticholinergic drug that blocks the activity of the muscarinic acetylcholine receptors (mAChRs). The muscarinic receptors are proteins involved in the transmission of signals through certain parts of the nervous system, and muscarinic receptor antagonists work to prevent this transmission from occurring. Notably, muscarinic antagonists reduce the activation of the parasympathetic nervous system. The normal function of the parasympathetic system is often summarised as "rest-and-digest", and includes slowing of the heart, an increased rate of digestion, narrowing of the airways, promotion of urination, and sexual arousal. Muscarinic antagonists counter this parasympathetic "rest-and-digest" response, and also work elsewhere in both the central and peripheral nervous systems.

Drugs with muscarinic antagonist activity are widely used in medicine, in the treatment of low heart rate, overactive bladder, respiratory problems such as asthma and chronic obstructive pulmonary disease (COPD). A number of other drugs, such as antipsychotics and the tricyclic family of antidepressants, have incidental muscarinic antagonist activity which can cause unwanted side effects such as difficulty urinating, dry mouth and skin, and constipation.

Acetylcholine (often abbreviated ACh) is a neurotransmitter whose receptors are proteins found in synapses and other cell membranes. Besides responding to their primary neurochemical, neurotransmitter receptors can be sensitive to a variety of other molecules. Acetylcholine receptors are classified into two groups based on this:

- muscarinic, which respond to muscarine
- nicotinic, which respond to nicotine

Most muscarinic receptor antagonists are synthetic chemicals; however, the two most commonly used anticholinergics, scopolamine and atropine, are belladonna alkaloids, and are naturally extracted from plants such as Atropa belladonna, commonly known as deadly nightshade. The name "belladonna", Italian for "beautiful woman", is thought to derive from one of the antimuscarinic effects of these alkaloids, having been put into use by women for the cosmetic purpose of promoting dilation of the pupils.

Muscarinic antagonist effects and muscarinic agonist effects counterbalance each other for homeostasis.

Certain muscarinic antagonists can be classified into either long-acting muscarinic receptor antagonists (LAMAs) or short-acting muscarinic receptor antagonists (SAMAs), depending on when maximum effect occurs and for how long the effect persists.

== Effects ==
Scopolamine and atropine have similar effects on the peripheral nervous system. However, scopolamine has greater effects on the central nervous system (CNS) than atropine due to its ability to cross the blood–brain barrier. At higher-than-therapeutic doses, atropine and scopolamine cause CNS depression characterized by amnesia, fatigue, and reduction in rapid eye movement sleep. Scopolamine (Hyoscine) has anti-emetic activity and is, therefore, used to treat motion sickness.

Antimuscarinics are also used as anti-parkinsonian drugs. In parkinsonism, there is imbalance between levels of acetylcholine and dopamine in the brain, involving both increased levels of acetylcholine and degeneration of dopaminergic pathways (nigrostriatal pathway). Thus, in parkinsonism there is decreased level of dopaminergic activity. One method of balancing the neurotransmitters is through blocking central cholinergic activity using muscarinic receptor antagonists.

Atropine acts on the M2 receptors of the heart and antagonizes the activity of acetylcholine. It causes tachycardia by blocking vagal effects on the sinoatrial node. Acetylcholine hyperpolarizes the sinoatrial node; this is overcome by MRAs, and thus they increase the heart rate. If atropine is given by intramuscular or subcutaneous injection, it causes initial bradycardia. This is because when administered intramuscularly or subcutaneously atropine acts on presynaptic M1 receptors (autoreceptors). Uptake of acetylcholine in axoplasm is prevented and the presynaptic nerve releases more acetylcholine into the synapse, which initially causes bradycardia.

In the atrioventricular node, the resting potential is lowered, which facilitates conduction. This is seen as a shortened PR-interval on an electrocardiogram. It has an opposite effect on blood pressure. Tachycardia and stimulation of the vasomotor center causes an increase in blood pressure. But, due to feedback regulation of the vasomotor center, there is a fall in blood pressure due to vasodilation.

Important muscarinic antagonists include atropine, hyoscyamine, hyoscine butylbromide and hydrobromide, ipratropium, tropicamide, cyclopentolate, pirenzepine and scopolamine.

Muscarinic antagonists such as ipratropium bromide can also be effective in treating asthma, since acetylcholine is known to cause smooth muscle contraction, especially in the bronchi.

== Comparison table ==
=== Overview ===
Substance	Selectivity	Clinical use	Adverse effects	Notes	Trade names
Atropine (D/L-Hyoscyamine)	NS	During anesthesia; Antidote to anticholinesterase poisoning; Atrial fibrillation with bradycardia; Antispasmodic in gastrointestinal hypermotility	UR; xerostomia; blurred vision	CD	Symax, HyoMax, Anaspaz, Egazil, Buwecon, Cystospaz, Levsin, Levbid, Levsinex, Donnamar, NuLev, Spacol T/S and Neoquess
Atropine methonitrate	NS	antispasmodic in gastrointestinal hypermotility		Blocks transmission in ganglia. Lacks CNS effects	
Aclidinium bromide	Selective	Bronchospasm; COPD		Long acting antagonist	Tudorza
Benztropine	M1-selective	PD; EPS caused by typical and atypical antipsychotics		Reduces the effects of the relative central cholinergic excess that occurs as a result of dopamine deficiency.	Cogentin
Cyclopentolate	NS	produce mydriasis and cycloplegia in diagnostics	may cause ocular hypertension	Short acting, CD	
Diphenhydramine	NS	for EPS from typical and atypical antipsychotic medications; antihistamine; sleep aid; PD; management of asthma symptoms; antiemetic	sedation; dry mouth; constipation; UR	Acts in the central nervous system, blood vessels and smooth muscle tissues	Benadryl, Nytol
Doxylamine	NS	antihistamine; antiemetic; sleep aid	dizziness; dry mouth		Unisom
Dimenhydrinate		motion sickness		Combination of diphenhydramine with a methylxanthine salt	Dramamine, Gravol
Dicyclomine		IBS			Bentyl
Darifenacin	Selective for M3	Urinary incontinence	Few side effects		Enablex
Flavoxate		Urinary bladder antispasmodic			Urispas
Glycopyrrolate (Glycopyrronium bromide)	NS	Prior to anesthesia to reduce salivary, tracheobronchial, and pharyngeal secretions; In combination with neostigmine to prevent muscarinic effects such as bradycardia; Sialorrhea; Hyperhidrosis; COPD	Dry mouth; UR; Headache; Vomiting	Does not cross the blood–brain barrier and has few to no central effects.	Robinul, Cuvposa, Seebri
Hydroxyzine				Very mild/negligible action	Vistaril, Atarax
Ipratropium bromide	NS	Asthma and bronchitis	Bronchial vasodilation	Lacks mucociliary excretion inhibition.	Atrovent and Apovent
Mebeverine		IBS in its primary form (e.g., Abdominal Pain, Bloating, Constipation, and Diarrhea).; Irritable bowel syndrome associated with organic lesions of the gastrointestinal tract. (e.g., diverticulosis & diverticulitis, etc.).	skin rashes	A muscolotropic spasmolytic with a strong and selective action on the smooth muscle spasm of the gastrointestinal tract, in particular of the colon.	Colofac, Duspatal, Duspatalin
Oxybutynin	M1/3/4 selective	overactive bladder; urge incontinence			Ditropan
Pirenzepine	M1-selective	in peptic ulcer (not much anymore)	(fewer than non-selective ones)	Inhibits gastric secretion	
Procyclidine	NS	Drug-induced parkinsonism, akathisia and acute dystonia; PD; Idiopathic or secondary dystonia	Overdose produces confusion, agitation and sleeplessness that can last up to or more than 24 hours. Pupils become dilated and unreactive to light. Tachycardia (fast heart beat), as well as auditory and visual hallucinations		
Scopolamine (L-Hyoscine)	NS	Same uses as atropine; Motion sickness	as atropine; sedation	CD	Scopace, Transderm-Scop, Maldemar, Buscopan
Solifenacin		overactive bladder (OAB); Urgency (urge incontinence)		Competitive antagonist	Vesicare
Tropicamide	NS	produce mydriasis and cycloplegia in diagnostics	may cause ocular hypertension	Short acting, CD	
Tiotropium		COPD			Spiriva
Trihexyphenidyl/Benzhexol	M1 selective	PD	Drug at relative dose has 83% activity of atropine, thus has the same side-effects		Artane
Tolterodine		urge incontinence			Detrusitol, Detrol

The muscarinic acetylcholine receptor subtype sectivities of a large number of antimuscarinic drugs have been reviewed.

=== Binding affinities ===
==== Anticholinergics ====
Compound	M_{1}	M_{2}	M_{3}	M_{4}	M_{5}	Species	Ref
3-Quinuclidinyl benzilate	0.035–0.044	0.027–0.030	0.080–0.088	0.034–0.037	0.043–0.065	Human	
4-DAMP	0.57–0.58	3.80–7.3	0.37–0.52	0.72–1.17	0.55–1.05	Human	
AF-DX 250	427	55.0	692	162	3020	Human	
AF-DX 384	30.9	6.03	66.1	10.0	537	Human	
AQ-RA 741	28.8	4.27	63.1	6.46	832	Human	
Atropine	0.21–0.50	0.76–1.5	0.15–1.1	0.13–0.6	0.21–1.7	Human	
Benzatropine (benztropine)	0.231	1.4	1.1	1.1	2.8	Human	
Biperiden	0.48	6.3	3.9	2.4	6.3	Human	
Darifenacin	5.5–13	47–77	0.84–2.0	8.6–22	2.3–5.4	Human	
Dicycloverine (dicyclomine)	57 (IC_{50})	415 (IC_{50})	67 (IC_{50})	97 (IC_{50})	53 (IC_{50})	Human/rat	
Glycopyrrolate	0.37	1.38	1.31	0.41	1.30	Human	
Hexahydrodifenidol	11	200	16	76 (IC_{50})	83	Human/rat	
Hexahydrosiladifenidol	44	249	10	298 (IC_{50})	63	Human/rat	
(R)-Hexbutinol	2.09	20.9	2.14	3.02	5.50	Human	
Hexocyclium	2.3	23	1.4	5.5	3.7	Human/rat	
Himbacine	107	10.0	93.3	11.0	490	Human	
Ipratropium	0.49	1.5	0.51	0.66	1.7	Human	
Methoctramine	16–50	3.6–14.4	118–277	31.6–38.0	57–313	Human	
N-Methylscopolamine	0.054–0.079	0.083–0.251	0.052–0.099	0.026–0.097	0.106–0.125	Human	
Orphenadrine	48	213	120	170	129	Human	
Otenzepad (AF-DX 116)	1300	186	838	1800 (IC_{50})	2800	Human/rat	
Oxybutynin	0.66	13	0.72	0.54	7.4	Human	
pFHHSiD	22.4	132	15.5	31.6	93.3	Human	
Pirenzepine	6.3–8	224–906	75–180	17–37	66–170	Human	
Procyclidine	4.6	25	12.4	7	24	Human	
Propiverine	476	2970	420	536	109	Human	
Scopolamine (hyoscine)	1.1	2.0	0.44	0.8	2.07	Human	
Silahexacyclium	2.0	35	1.2	3.2	2.0	Human/rat	
Timepidium	34	7.7	31	18	11	Human	
Tiquizium	4.1	4.0	2.8	3.6	8.2	Human	
Trihexyphenidyl	1.6	7	6.4	2.6	15.9	Human	
Tripitamine (tripitramine)	1.58	0.27	38.25	6.41	33.87	Human	
Zamifenacin	55	153	10	68	34	Human	
Values are K_{i} (nM). The smaller the value, the more strongly the drug binds to the site.

==== Antihistamines ====
Compound	M_{1}	M_{2}	M_{3}	M_{4}	M_{5}	Species	Ref
Brompheniramine	25700	32400	50100	67600	28800	Human	
Chlorphenamine (chlorpheniramine)	19000	17000	52500	77600	28200	Human	
Cyproheptadine	12	7	12	8	11.8	Human	
Diphenhydramine	80–100	120–490	84–229	53–112	30–260	Human	
Doxylamine	490	2100	650	380	180	Human	
Mequitazine	5.6	14	5.3	11.1	11.0	Human	
Terfenadine	8710	8510	5250	30900	11200	Human	
Values are K_{i} (nM). The smaller the value, the more strongly the drug binds to the site.

==== Antidepressants ====
Compound	M_{1}	M_{2}	M_{3}	M_{4}	M_{5}	Species	Ref
Amitriptyline	14.7	11.8	12.8	7.2	15.7	Human	
Bupropion	>35,000	>35,000	>35,000	>35,000	>35,000	Human	
Citalopram	1430	ND	ND	ND	ND	Human	
Desipramine	110	540	210	160	143	Human	
Desmethylcitalopram	>10000	>10000	>10000	>10000	>10000	Human	
Desmethyldesipramine	404	927	317	629	121	Human	
Desvenlafaxine	>10000	>10000	>10000	>10000	>10000	Human	
Dosulepin (dothiepin)	18	109	38	61	92	Human	
Doxepin	18–38	160–230	25–52	20–82	5.6–75	Human	
Escitalopram	1242	ND	ND	ND	ND	Human	
Etoperidone	>35000	>35000	>35000	>35000	>35000	Human	
Femoxetine	92	150	220	470	400	Human	
Fluoxetine	702–1030	2700	1000	2900	2700	Human	
Fluvoxamine	31200	ND	ND	ND	ND	Human	
Imipramine	42	88	60	112	83	Human	
Lofepramine	67	330	130	340	460	Human	
Norfluoxetine	1200	4600	760	2600	2200	Human	
Nortriptyline	40	110	50	84	97	Human	
Paroxetine	72–300	340	80	320	650	Human	
Sertraline	427–1300	2100	1300	1400	1900	Human	
Tianeptine	>10000	>10000	>10000	>10000	>10000	Human	
Trazodone	>35,000	>35,000	>35,000	>35,000	>35,000	Human	
Venlafaxine	>35000	>35000	>35000	>35000	>35000	Human	
Values are K_{i} (nM). The smaller the value, the more strongly the drug binds to the site.

==== Antipsychotics ====
Compound	M_{1}	M_{2}	M_{3}	M_{4}	M_{5}	Species	Ref
Amisulpride	>10,000	>10,000	>10,000	>10,000	>10,000	Human	
Aripiprazole	6780	3510	4680	1520	2330	Human	
Asenapine	>10000	>10000	>10000	>10000	ND	Human	
Bromperidol	7600	1800	7140	1700	4800	Human	
Chlorprothixene	11	28	22	18	25	Human	
Chlorpromazine	25	150	67	40	42	Human	
Clozapine	1.4–31	7–204	6–109	5–27	5–26	Human	
Cyamemazine (cyamepromazine)	13	42	32	12	35	Human	
N-Desmethylclozapine	67.6	414.5	95.7	169.9	35.4	Human	
Fluperlapine	8.8	71	41	14	17	Human	
Fluphenazine	1095	7163	1441	5321	357	Human	
Haloperidol	>10000	>10000	>10000	>10000	>10000	Human	
Iloperidone	4898	3311	>10000	8318	>10000	Human	
Loxapine	63.9–175	300–590	122–390	300–2232	91–241	Human	
Melperone	>15000	2400	>15000	4400	>15000	Human	
Mesoridazine	10	15	90	19	60	Human	
Molindone	ND	ND	>10000	ND	ND	Human	
Olanzapine	1.9–73	18–96	13–132	10–32	6–48	Human	
Perphenazine	ND	ND	1848	ND	ND	Human	
Pimozide	ND	ND	1955	ND	ND	Human	
Quetiapine	120–135	630–705	225–1320	660–2990	2990	Human	
Remoxipride	>10000	>10000	>10000	>10000	ND	Human	
Rilapine	190	470	1400	1000	1100	Human	
Risperidone	11000	≥3700	13000	≥2900	>15000	Human	
Sertindole	ND	ND	2692	ND	ND	Human	
Tenilapine	260	62	530	430	660	Human	
Thioridazine	2.7	14	15	9	13	Human	
Thiothixene	>10000	>10000	>10000	>10000	5376	Human	
cis-Thiothixene	2600	2100	1600	1540	4310	Human	
Tiospirone	630	180	1290	480	3900	Human	
Trifluoperazine	ND	ND	1001	ND	ND	Human	
Ziprasidone	≥300	>3000	>1300	>1600	>1600	Human	
Zotepine	18	140	73	77	260	Human	
Values are K_{i} (nM). The smaller the value, the more strongly the drug binds to the site.

== See also ==
- Anticholinergic
- Muscarinic agonist
- Nicotinic acetylcholine receptor
- Nicotinic agonist
- Nicotinic antagonist
- Parasympatholytic
