= Procyclidine =

Group of stereoisomers

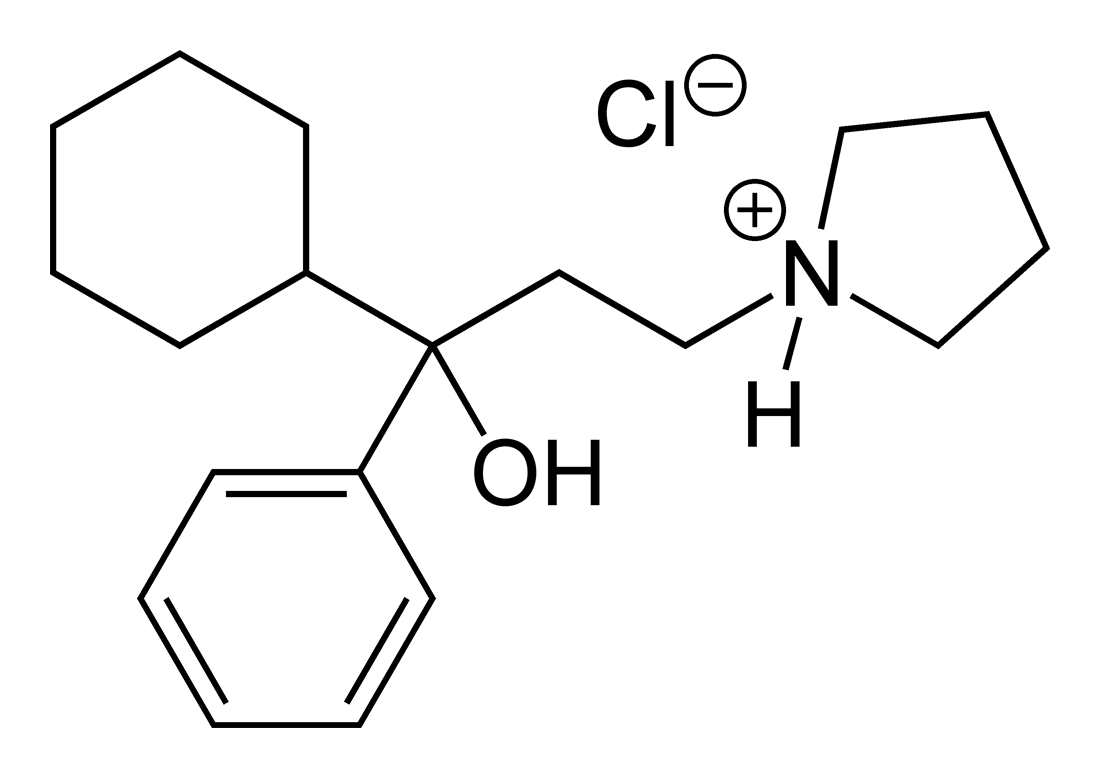

Clinical data
- AHFS/Drugs.com: Monograph
- MedlinePlus: a605037
- Routes of administration: By mouth, im, iv
- ATC code: N04AA04 (WHO)

Pharmacokinetic data
- Protein binding: ~100%-albumin
- Elimination half-life: ~12 h

Identifiers
- IUPAC name: 1-cyclohexyl-1-phenyl-3-pyrrolidin-1-yl-propan-1-ol hydrochloride
- CAS Number: 77-37-2 77-37-2 (free base)
- PubChem CID: 207841
- DrugBank: DB00387
- ChemSpider: 4750
- UNII: C6QE1Q1TKR
- KEGG: D08425
- ChEMBL: ChEMBL1761
- CompTox Dashboard (EPA): DTXSID2023515
- ECHA InfoCard: 100.000.931

Chemical and physical data
- Formula: C_{19}H_{30}ClNO
- Molar mass: 323.90 g·mol^{−1}
- 3D model (JSmol): Interactive image
- SMILES: OC(C1=CC=CC=C1)(C2CCCCC2)CCN3CCCC3

Procyclidine is an anticholinergic drug principally used for the treatment of drug-induced parkinsonism, akathisia and acute dystonia, Parkinson's disease, and idiopathic or secondary dystonia.

== Medical uses ==
It is used in patients with parkinsonism and akathisia, and to reduce the side effects of antipsychotic treatment given for schizophrenia. Procyclidine is also a second-line drug for the treatment of Parkinson's disease. It improves tremor but not rigidity or bradykinesia.

Procyclidine is also sometimes used for the treatment of dystonia (but not tardive dyskinesia), a rare disorder that causes abnormal muscle contraction, resulting in twisting postures of limbs, trunk, or face.

== Side effects ==
Side effects include nausea, constipation, urinary retention, blurred vision, anxiety, cognitive impairment, confusion, dizziness, gingivitis, hallucination, memory loss, rash and vomiting.

== Overdose ==
Signs of procyclidine overdose are those of an anticholinergic and include confusion, agitation and sleeplessness that can last up to or more than 24 hours. Pupils become dilated and unreactive to light. Tachycardia (fast heart beat), as well as auditory and visual hallucinations have also been reported.

Other known symptoms of overdose are: clumsiness or unsteadiness, being severely drowsy, having a severely dry mouth, nose, or throat, having an altered mood or other mental changes, seizures, being short of breath or having troubled breathing, a dry and warm, flushed skin.

A suspected overdose with severe life-threatening symptoms should immediately be brought to medical attention, where reversal can be attempted with physostigmine administered intravenously or subcutaneously.

== Pharmacology ==
=== Pharmacodynamics ===
Procyclidine is an anticholinergic. It is specifically an antimuscarinic. The drug acts as a non-selective antagonist of the muscarinic acetylcholine M_{1}, M_{2}, and M_{4} receptors, whereas its activities at the M_{3} and M_{5} receptors are reportedly unknown.

== Chemistry ==
=== Synthesis ===
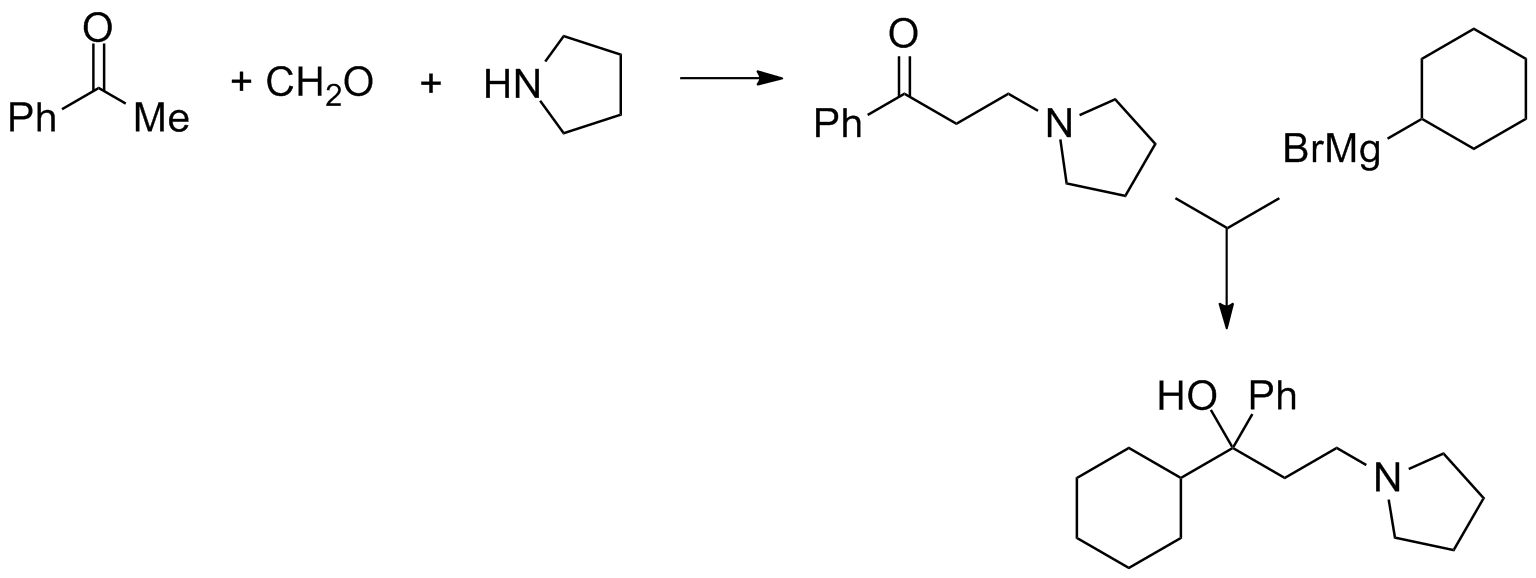
Procyclidine synthesis: U.S. patent 2,826,590

Procyclidine, 1-cyclohexyl-1-phenyl-3-pyrrolidinopropan-1-ol, is synthesized in exactly the same manner as was seen for trihexyphenidyl, except this time the linear synthesis begins with the preparation of 3-(1-pyrrolidino)propiophenone.

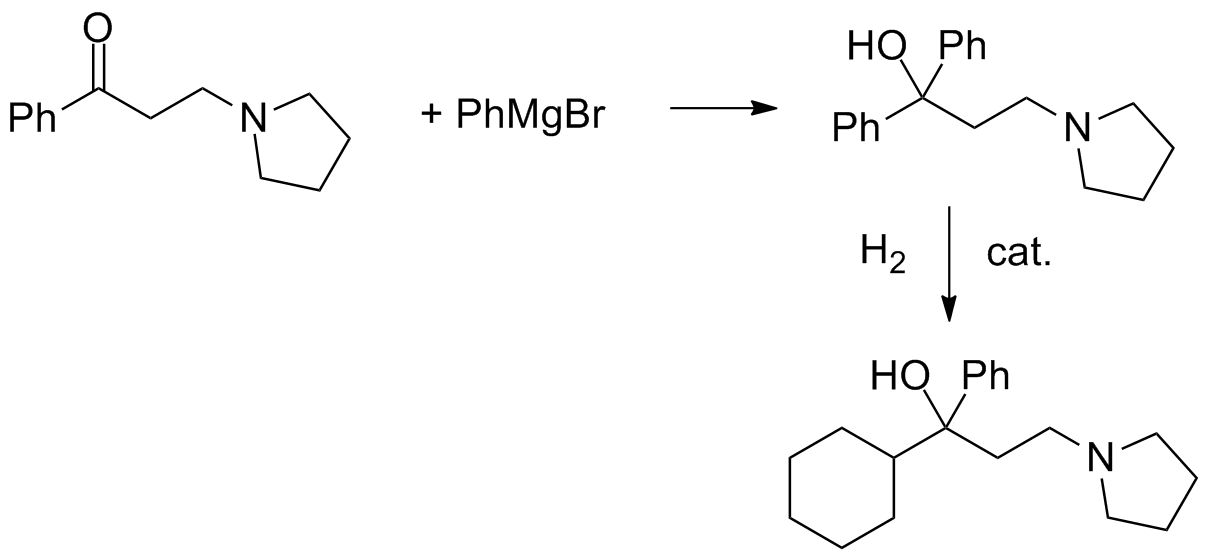
Procyclidine synthesis 2

In an interesting variation, the ketone is first reacted with phenylmagnesium bromide. Catalytic hydrogenation of the carbinol thus obtained can be stopped after the reduction of only one aromatic ring.

Procyclidine synthesis (Morton)

Morton method: The Reformatsky reaction between Cyclohexyl phenyl ketone (BzCy) [712-50-5] (1) and Ethyl Bromoacetate [105-36-2] (2) gives ethyl 3-cyclohexyl-3-hydroxy-3-phenylpropanoate, PC12565684 (3). The reduction of the ester gives 1-cyclohexyl-1-phenylpropane-1,3-diol, PC13841193 (4). FGI of the primary alcohol to the Tosyl leaving group gives 3-Cyclohexyl-3-hydroxy-3-phenylpropyl 4-methylbenzenesulfonate [102473-43-8] (5). Alkylation with pyrrolidine [123-75-1] completes the synthesis of procyclidine.

== See also ==
- Benzatropine
- Biperiden
- Cycrimine
