= Pentolinium =

Chemical compound

Identifiers
- IUPAC name: 1-Methyl-1-[5-(1-methylpyrrolidin-1-ium-1-yl)pentyl]pyrrolidin-1-ium
- CAS Number: 144-44-5 52-62-0 (tartrate salt)
- PubChem CID: 5850
- DrugBank: DB01090
- ChemSpider: 5641
- UNII: ULL76WPU5X
- ChEMBL: ChEMBL1271
- CompTox Dashboard (EPA): DTXSID5048554

Chemical and physical data
- Formula: C_{15}H_{32}N_{2}^{2+}
- Molar mass: 240.435 g·mol^{−1}
- InChI: InChI=1S/C15H32N2/c1-16(12-6-7-13-16)10-4-3-5-11-17(2)14-8-9-15-17/h3-15H2,1-2H3/q+2; Key:XSBSKEQEUFOSDD-UHFFFAOYSA-N

Pentolinium, also known as pentapyrrolidinium, is a ganglionic blocking agent which acts as a nicotinic acetylcholine receptor antagonist. Formulated as the pentolinium tartrate salt, it was marketed under the trade name Ansolysen. It can be used as an antihypertensive drug during surgery or to control hypertensive crises. It works by binding to the acetylcholine receptor of adrenergic nerves and thereby inhibiting the release of noradrenaline and adrenaline. Blocking this receptor leads to smooth muscle relaxation and vasodilation.

== Route of administration and dose ==
Pentolinium can be given orally (20mg three times a day), injected intramuscularly, or administered intravenously.

== Use ==
Pentolinium and hexamethonium combined with Rauvolfia was reported in 1955 to be effective in the outpatient management of moderate to severe hypertension, with satisfactory orthostatic reduction in blood pressure but there are significant untoward effects attributable to the use of the hexamethonium. Pentolinium has been reported to offer more prolonged ganglionic blockade and has less severe untoward effects than hexamethonium.

== History ==
Pentolinium was developed in the early 1950s at May & Baker among several other related compounds with potential ganglionic blocking activity. It was assigned the code name M. & B. 2050A. The first clinical trials were conducted by F. H. Smirk at Dunedin Hospital in 1952.
