= Tripitramine =

Selective M2 receptor antagonist

Clinical data
- Other names: Tripitamine
- Drug class: Muscarinic acetylcholine receptor antagonist; Selective muscarinic acetylcholine M_{2} receptor antagonist

Identifiers
- IUPAC name: 11-[2-[6-[8-[6-[bis[2-oxo-2-(6-oxo-5H-pyrido[2,3-b][1,4]benzodiazepin-11-yl)ethyl]amino]hexyl-methylamino]octyl-methylamino]hexylamino]acetyl]-5H-pyrido[2,3-b][1,4]benzodiazepin-6-one
- CAS Number: 152429-64-6
- PubChem CID: 132947
- IUPHAR/BPS: 361
- ChemSpider: 117328
- ChEMBL: ChEMBL265256
- CompTox Dashboard (EPA): DTXSID30165030

Chemical and physical data
- Formula: C_{64}H_{77}N_{13}O_{6}
- Molar mass: 1124.405 g·mol^{−1}
- 3D model (JSmol): Interactive image
- SMILES: CN(CCCCCCCCN(C)CCCCCCN(CC(=O)N1C2=CC=CC=C2C(=O)NC3=C1N=CC=C3)CC(=O)N4C5=CC=CC=C5C(=O)NC6=C4N=CC=C6)CCCCCCNCC(=O)N7C8=CC=CC=C8C(=O)NC9=C7N=CC=C9
- InChI: InChI=1S/C64H77N13O6/c1-72(41-20-8-5-17-35-65-44-56(78)75-53-32-14-11-26-47(53)62(81)69-50-29-23-36-66-59(50)75)39-18-6-3-4-7-19-40-73(2)42-21-9-10-22-43-74(45-57(79)76-54-33-15-12-27-48(54)63(82)70-51-30-24-37-67-60(51)76)46-58(80)77-55-34-16-13-28-49(55)64(83)71-52-31-25-38-68-61(52)77/h11-16,23-34,36-38,65H,3-10,17-22,35,39-46H2,1-2H3,(H,69,81)(H,70,82)(H,71,83); Key:YUJOQEAGGUIMED-UHFFFAOYSA-N

Tripitramine, or tripitamine, is an antimuscarinic drug which was never marketed.

== Pharmacology ==
The drug is a selective antagonist of the muscarinic acetylcholine M_{2} receptor. Its affinities (K_{i}) for the muscarinic acetylcholine receptors are 0.27 nM for the M_{2} receptor, 1.58 nM for the M_{1} receptor (5.9-fold less than for M_{2}), 6.41 nM for the M_{4} receptor (24-fold less than for M_{2}), 33.87 nM for the M_{5} receptor (125-fold less than for M_{2}), and 38.25 nM for the M_{3} receptor (142-fold less than for M_{2}). Tripitramine has been found to be cardioselective and to increase heart rate in animals.

== Chemistry ==
Structurally, it consists of three pirenzepine- or AQ-RA 741-like tricyclic (more specifically pyridobenzodiazepine) moieties bound together by a long amine-containing hydrocarbon chain similar to the one found within methoctramine (a modestly M_{2}-selective antimuscarinic agent). Related compounds with analogous structural designs include dipitramine, spirotramine, caproctamine, and benextramine, among others.

== History ==
Tripitramine was first described in the scientific literature by 1993. It was developed in efforts to discover more highly selective M_{2} receptor antagonists than methoctramine.
