= Cycrimine =

Chemical compound

Clinical data
- License data: US FDA: Cycrimine
- ATC code: none

Identifiers
- IUPAC name: 1-Cyclopentyl-1-phenyl-3-(piperidin-1-yl)propan-1-ol
- CAS Number: 77-39-4
- PubChem CID: 2911
- DrugBank: DB00942
- ChemSpider: 2808
- UNII: 543567RFQQ
- ChEBI: CHEBI:59692
- ChEMBL: ChEMBL1201227
- CompTox Dashboard (EPA): DTXSID50861769
- ECHA InfoCard: 100.000.932

Chemical and physical data
- Formula: C_{19}H_{29}NO
- Molar mass: 287.447 g·mol^{−1}
- 3D model (JSmol): Interactive image
- SMILES: OC(CCN1CCCCC1)(C2CCCC2)c3ccccc3
- InChI: InChI=1S/C19H29NO/c21-19(18-11-5-6-12-18,17-9-3-1-4-10-17)13-16-20-14-7-2-8-15-20/h1,3-4,9-10,18,21H,2,5-8,11-16H2; Key:SWRUZBWLEWHWRI-UHFFFAOYSA-N

Cycrimine (trade name Pagitane) is an anticholinergic drug used in the treatment of Parkinson's disease. It is an antagonist of muscarinic acetylcholine receptor M1.

== Synthesis ==
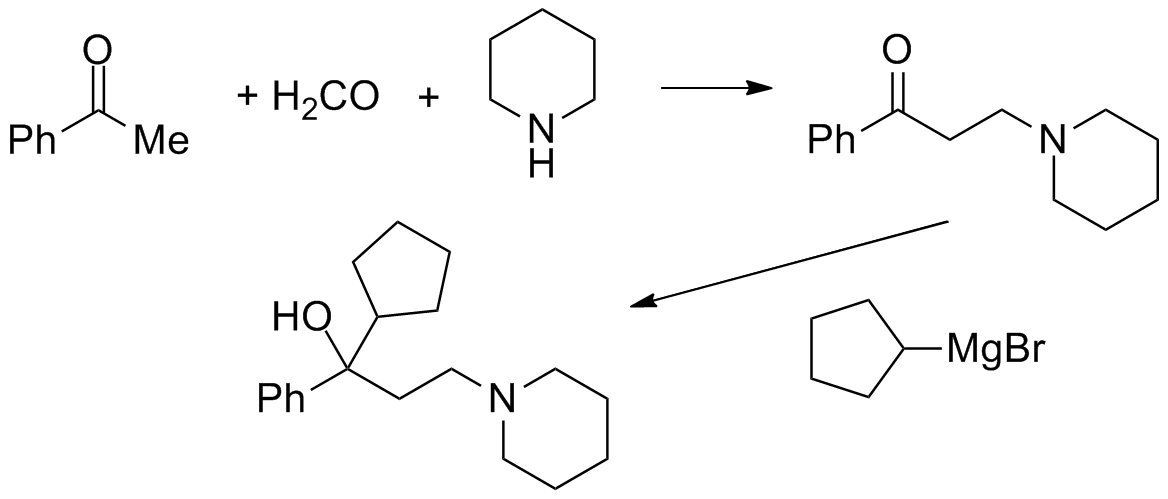
Cycrimine synthesis:

== See also ==
- Biperiden
- Procyclidine
- Trihexyphenidyl
