= BIBN 99 =

Muscarinic acetylcholine receptor antagonist

Names
- IUPAC name N-[3-[1-[2-(8-chloro-6-oxo-5H-pyrido[2,3-b][1,4]benzodiazepin-11-yl)-2-oxoethyl]piperidin-4-yl]propyl]-N-ethyl-2,2-dimethylpentanamide

Identifiers
CAS Number	145301-48-0
3D model (JSmol)	Interactive image
ChEMBL	ChEMBL4468100
ChemSpider	117150
PubChem CID	132712
CompTox Dashboard (EPA)	DTXSID00162975
- InChI: Key: LUPAFPUKESJDMZ-UHFFFAOYSA-N; InChI=1S/C31H42ClN5O3/c1-5-15-31(3,4)30(40)36(6-2)17-8-9-22-13-18-35(19-14-22)21-27(38)37-26-12-11-23(32)20-24(26)29(39)34-25-10-7-16-33-28(25)37/h7,10-12,16,20,22H,5-6,8-9,13-15,17-19,21H2,1-4H3,(H,34,39)
- SMILES: CCCC(C)(C)C(=O)N(CC)CCCC1CCN(CC1)CC(=O)N2C3=C(C=C(C=C3)Cl)C(=O)NC4=C2N=CC=C4

Properties
Chemical formula	C_{31}H_{42}ClN_{5}O_{3}
Molar mass	568.16 g·mol^{−1}
- Except where otherwise noted, data are given for materials in their standard state (at 25 °C [77 °F], 100 kPa). Infobox references

BIBN 99 is an antagonist of mACh receptors. Specifically, it is selective for the M_{2} type, and was prototypical for this class of selective compounds. BIBN 99 is lipophilic, it crosses the blood-brain barrier and is a competitive antagonist of the M_{2} receptor with 30-fold selectivity over M_{1} receptors.

== Effects ==
During research, it was observed that BIBN 99 was able to diminish the cognitive deficits caused by injury. Another also came to the conclusion that the compound could provide cognitive improvements. The cognitive effects could possibly be caused by the increased release of acetylcholine, a neurotransmitter.
