= Antoine Charial =

Antoine Charial (March 18, 1885, Murat, Corrèze – April 8, 1965, Lyon) was a French trades unionist and leader of the co-operative movement.

Antoine Charial was born in Murat, Correze in 1885, the son of Jean-Baptiste Charial (1859–1920) and his wife Jeanne Françoise Barbasanges (1859–1944). One of six children of a poor rural family, Antoine Charial came to Lyon at the age of 16 to work in the building trade. By 1910, he was secretary of the local stone masons trade union, and a delegate to the CGT national congress.

Excluded by illness from military service in World War I, Charial worked at the artillery depot in Angouleme and latterly at the Lyon Arsenal.

After the war he founded ‘’L’Avenir’’ (‘’The Future’’), a co-operative society for building workers, and became its first director. Charial was director of the General Confederation of Cooperative Societies from 1932 until 1946.

In 1920, he was elected as a socialist member of Lyon city council and represented the third arrondissement until 1936, serving as deputy mayor and as chair of the health and housing committees.

He was honoured with membership of the Légion d’honneur and the Order of Public Health.

Charial lived at rue Moncey in the 3rd arrondissement of Lyon. Rue Antoine Charial, the Hopital Antoine Charial and the Antoine Charial elementary school in Lyon are named in his honour.

His son Lucien (1917–1971) became technical director of the Theraplix pharmaceutical laboratories.
