= Nicotinic antagonist =

Drug that inhibits the action of acetylcholine at nicotinic acetylcholine receptors

A nicotinic antagonist is a type of anticholinergic drug that inhibits the action of acetylcholine (ACh) at nicotinic acetylcholine receptors. These compounds are mainly used for peripheral muscle paralysis in surgery, the classical agent of this type being tubocurarine, but some centrally acting compounds such as bupropion, mecamylamine, and 18-methoxycoronaridine block nicotinic acetylcholine receptors in the brain and have been proposed for treating nicotine addiction.

Comparison
| Mechanism | Antagonist | Preferred receptor | Clinical use |
|---|---|---|---|
| Ganglionic blocking agents | Hexamethonium | Ganglion type | None |
| Ganglionic blocking agents | Mecamylamine | Ganglion type | |
| Ganglionic blocking agents | Trimethaphan | Ganglion type | Rarely used for blood pressure decrease during surgery |
| Nondepolarizing neuromuscular blocking agents | Atracurium | Muscle type | Muscle relaxant in anaesthesia |
| Nondepolarizing neuromuscular blocking agents | Doxacurium | Muscle type | |
| Nondepolarizing neuromuscular blocking agents | Mivacurium | Muscle type | |
| Nondepolarizing neuromuscular blocking agents | Pancuronium | Muscle type | Muscle relaxant in anaesthesia |
| Nondepolarizing neuromuscular blocking agents | Tubocurarine | Muscle type | Discovered in arrow poison; it was the first peripheral muscle relaxant. Rarely used since the 1980s. |
| Nondepolarizing neuromuscular blocking agents | Vecuronium | Muscle type | Muscle relaxant in anaesthesia |
| Depolarizing neuromuscular blocking agents | Succinylcholine* | Muscle type | |
| Centrally acting nicotinic antagonists | 18-Methoxycoronaridine | α3β4 | |
| Centrally acting nicotinic antagonists | Bupropion | α3β4. α4β2, α1β1γδ | Antidepressant (NDRI) |
| Centrally acting nicotinic antagonists | Hydroxybupropion | α3β4. α4β2, α1β1γδ | Antidepressant (NDRI). Metabolite of bupropion. |
| Centrally acting nicotinic antagonists | Threohydrobupropion | α3β4. | Antidepressant (NDRI). Metabolite of bupropion. |
| Centrally acting nicotinic antagonists | Dextromethorphan | α3β4. α4β2, α7 | Common over the counter antitussive. |
| Centrally acting nicotinic antagonists | Dextrorphan | α3β4. α4β2, α7 | Metabolite of dextromethorphan; no accepted medical uses. |
| Centrally acting nicotinic antagonists | 3-Methoxymorphinan | α3β4 | Secondary metabolite of dextromethorphan; not used in medical practice. Unknown medical efficacy. |

- Note: Succinylcholine is a nicotinic agonist. See neuromuscular blocking agents page for details on the mechanism of action.

== See also ==
- Nicotinic acetylcholine receptor
- Nicotinic agonist
- Muscarinic acetylcholine receptor
- Muscarinic agonist
- Muscarinic antagonist
