= Vedaclidine =

Chemical compound

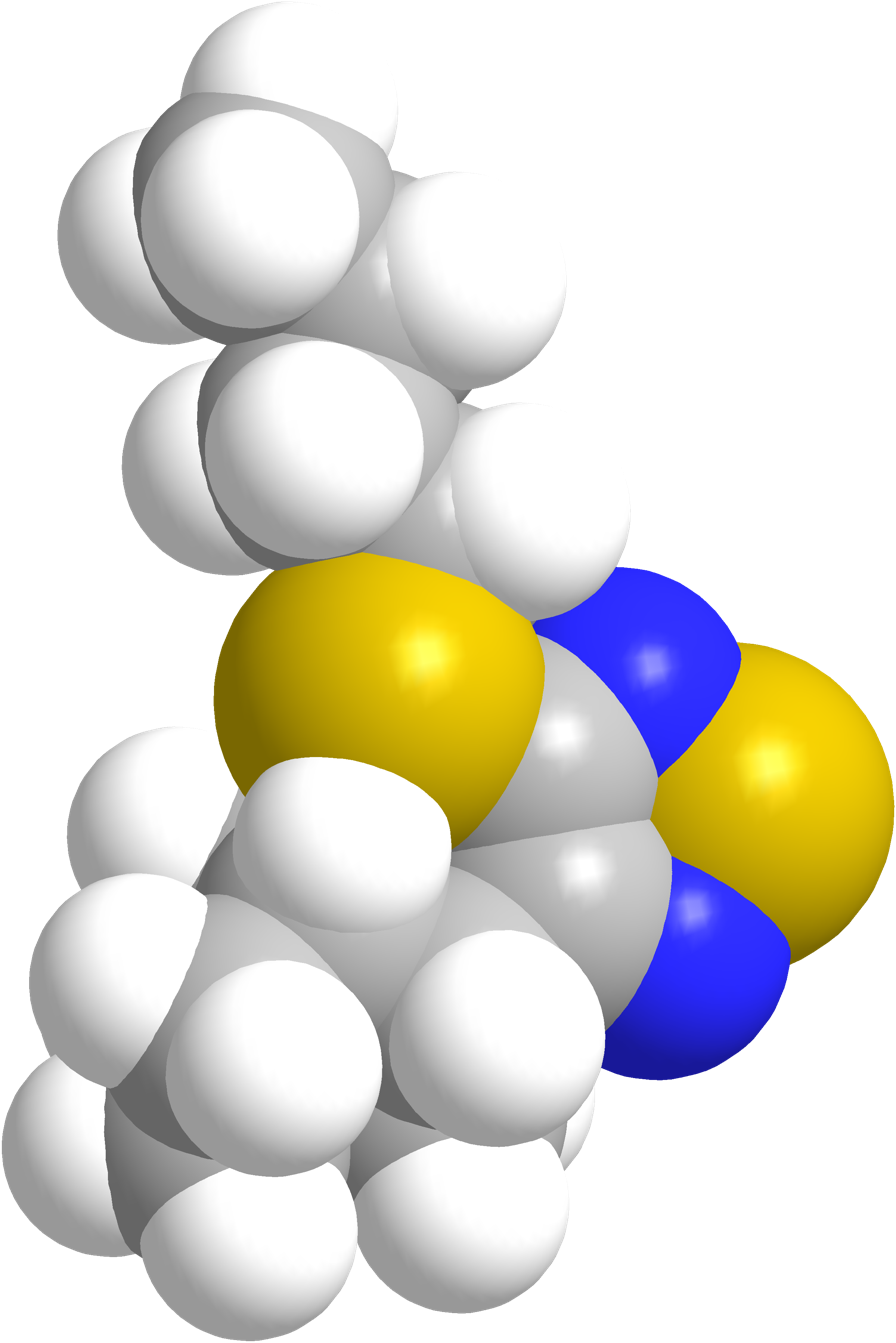

Clinical data
- Other names: (S)-3-[4-(butylthio)-1,2,5-thiadiazol-3-yl]quinuclidine
- Routes of administration: oral
- ATC code: None

Identifiers
- IUPAC name: (3S)-3-[4-(Butylsulfanyl)-1,2,5-thiadiazol-3-yl]quinuclidine
- CAS Number: 141575-50-0
- PubChem CID: 9889093
- ChemSpider: 8064764
- UNII: 98IW5HAV1N
- ChEMBL: ChEMBL136807
- CompTox Dashboard (EPA): DTXSID30275663

Chemical and physical data
- Formula: C_{13}H_{21}N_{3}S_{2}
- Molar mass: 283.45 g·mol^{−1}
- 3D model (JSmol): Interactive image
- SMILES: CCCCSC1=NSN=C1[C@@H]2CN3CCC2CC3
- InChI: InChI=1S/C13H21N3S2/c1-2-3-8-17-13-12(14-18-15-13)11-9-16-6-4-10(11)5-7-16/h10-11H,2-9H2,1H3/t11-/m1/s1; Key:WZZPXVURFDJHGI-LLVKDONJSA-N

Vedaclidine (INN, codenamed LY-297,802, NNC 11-1053) is an experimental analgesic drug which acts as a mixed agonist–antagonist at muscarinic acetylcholine receptors, being a potent and selective agonist for the M_{1} and M_{4} subtypes, yet an antagonist at the M_{2}, M_{3} and M_{5} subtypes. It is orally active and an effective analgesic over 3× the potency of morphine, with side effects such as salivation and tremor only occurring at many times the effective analgesic dose. Human trials showed little potential for development of dependence or abuse, and research is continuing into possible clinical application in the treatment of neuropathic pain and cancer pain relief.

== See also ==
- Aceclidine
- Talsaclidine
