= Chlorisondamine =

Chemical compound

Clinical data
- ATC code: None

Identifiers
- IUPAC name: Trimethyl-[2-(4,5,6,7-tetrachloro-2-methyl-isoindolin-2-ium-2-yl)ethyl]ammonium dichloride
- CAS Number: 7701-62-4
- PubChem CID: 6243
- ChemSpider: 6008
- UNII: JD3M24F66I
- ChEMBL: ChEMBL2104531
- CompTox Dashboard (EPA): DTXSID0048395

Chemical and physical data
- Formula: C_{14}H_{20}Cl_{6}N_{2}
- Molar mass: 429.03 g·mol^{−1}
- 3D model (JSmol): Interactive image
- SMILES: [Cl-].[Cl-].Clc1c2c(c(Cl)c(Cl)c1Cl)C[N+](C2)(C)CC[N+](C)(C)C
- InChI: InChI=1S/C14H20Cl4N2/c1-19(2,3)5-6-20(4)7-9-10(8-20)12(16)14(18)13(17)11(9)15/h5-8H2,1-4H3/q+2; Key:IXWDUZLHWJKVPX-UHFFFAOYSA-N

Chlorisondamine is a nicotinic acetylcholine receptor antagonist that produces both neuronal and ganglionic blockade.

Chlorisondamine has been shown to form noncovalent complexes with various biomolecules including sphingomyelin and other associated glycolipids.
