= Hydrocodone/homatropine =

Medication

Combination of
- Hydrocodone: Opioid agonist
- Homatropine: Muscarinic antagonist

Clinical data
- Trade names: Tussigon, Hycodan, Hydromet, others
- AHFS/Drugs.com: Micromedex Detailed Consumer Information
- License data: US DailyMed: Hydrocodone and homatropine
- Routes of administration: By mouth
- ATC code: None

Legal status
- Legal status: US: Schedule II

Identifiers
- CAS Number: 8013-91-0
- KEGG: D11076

Hydrocodone/homatropine, sold under the brand name Tussigon among others, is a fixed-dose combination medication used for the treatment of cough. It contains hydrocodone, as the bitartrate, an opioid agonist; and homatropine, as the methylbromide, a muscarinic antagonist. It is taken by mouth.

Hydrocodone/homatropine was approved for medical use in the United States in 1943.

== Adverse effects ==
In the US, the label for hydrocodone/homatropine contains a black box warning about addiction, abuse, and misuse.
