= François Albert-Buisson =

French entrepreneur (1881–1961)

- Born: May 3, 1881; Issoire, Puy-de-Dôme, France
- Died: May 21, 1961 (aged 80); Aix-en-Provence, France
- Occupations: entrepreneur industrialist consular magistrate economist politician, historian.

François Albert-Buisson (French pronunciation: [fʁɑ̃swa albɛʁ bɥisɔ̃]; 3 May 1881, Issoire, Puy-de-Dôme – 21 May 1961, Aix-en-Provence) was a French entrepreneur, industrialist, consular magistrate, economist, politician, and historian.

== Background ==
François Albert-Buisson was born in 1881 to Pierre Buisson and Marie Boste. A prolific businessperson, his many roles ranged from pharmacist and founder of the pharmaceutical company Theraplix to banker and literary figure. François Albert-Buisson is noted for being the fourteenth member elected to occupy seat two of the Académie Française in 1955.
