= Talsaclidine =

Chemical compound

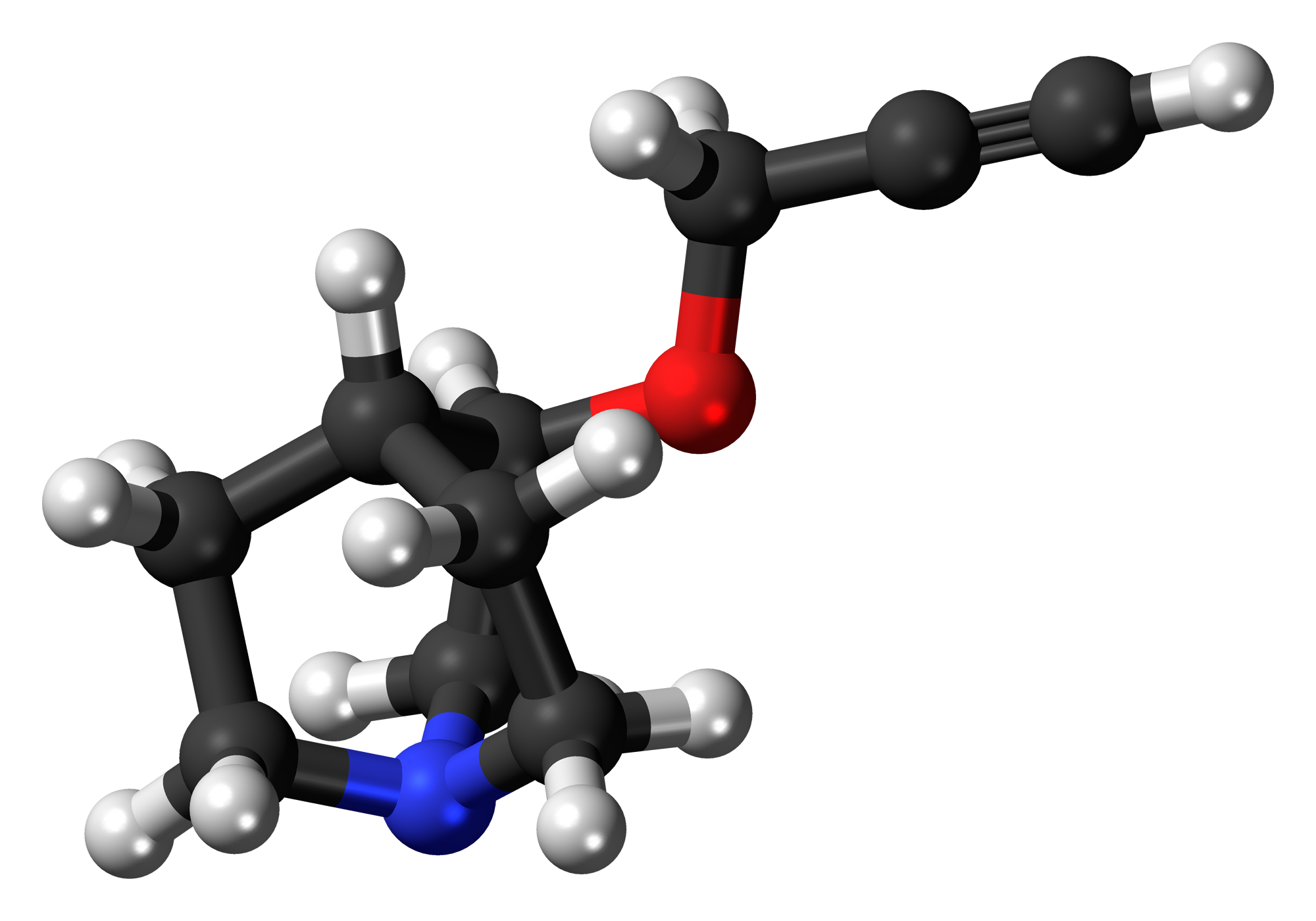

Clinical data
- ATC code: None

Pharmacokinetic data
- Bioavailability: 70%
- Protein binding: 7%
- Excretion: Renal (86%)

Identifiers
- IUPAC name: (3R)-3-(Prop-2-yn-1-yloxy)-1-azabicyclo[2.2.2]octane
- CAS Number: 147025-53-4
- PubChem CID: 71792
- ChemSpider: 64819
- UNII: 1O8VSL798T
- CompTox Dashboard (EPA): DTXSID20163565
- ECHA InfoCard: 100.161.949

Chemical and physical data
- Formula: C_{10}H_{15}NO
- Molar mass: 165.236 g·mol^{−1}
- 3D model (JSmol): Interactive image
- SMILES: O([C@@H]2C1CCN(CC1)C2)CC#C

Talsaclidine (WAL-2014) is a non-selective muscarinic acetylcholine receptor agonist which acts as a full agonist at the M_{1} subtype, and as a partial agonist at the M_{2} and M_{3} subtypes. It was under development for the treatment of Alzheimer's disease but showed only modest or poor efficacy in rhesus monkeys and humans, respectively, perhaps due to an array of dose-limiting side effects including increased heart rate and blood pressure, increased salivation, urinary frequency and burning upon urination, increased lacrimation and nasal secretion, abnormal accommodation, heartburn, upset stomach as well as cramps, nausea, vomiting and diarrhea, excessive sweating and palpitations.

== See also ==
- Aceclidine
- Vedaclidine
