= BAY 2413555 =

Identifiers
- IUPAC name: 7-[(3R,4R)-3,4-dihydroxypyrrolidin-1-yl]-6-fluoro-4-oxo-N-[(2S)-3,3,4,4,4-pentafluorobutan-2-yl]-1-(2,4,6-trifluorophenyl)-1,8-naphthyridine-3-carboxamide
- CAS Number: 2206665-50-9
- PubChem CID: 172431614
- UNII: L3ZD2JT6N7

Chemical and physical data
- Formula: C_{23}H_{17}F_{9}N_{4}O_{4}
- Molar mass: 584.399 g·mol^{−1}
- 3D model (JSmol): Interactive image
- SMILES: C[C@@H](C(C(F)(F)F)(F)F)NC(=O)C1=CN(C2=NC(=C(C=C2C1=O)F)N3C[C@H]([C@@H](C3)O)O)C4=C(C=C(C=C4F)F)F
- InChI: InChI=1S/C23H17F9N4O4/c1-8(22(28,29)23(30,31)32)33-21(40)11-5-36(17-12(25)2-9(24)3-13(17)26)19-10(18(11)39)4-14(27)20(34-19)35-6-15(37)16(38)7-35/h2-5,8,15-16,37-38H,6-7H2,1H3,(H,33,40)/t8-,15+,16+/m0/s1; Key:VTFWALACVWFKNO-OCJYXSBASA-N

BAY 2413555 is an experimental drug that acts as a potent and selective positive allosteric modulator of the Muscarinic acetylcholine receptor M2. It has been investigated as an agent to stabilise heart rhythm.
