= Otenzepad =

Drug

- Structure of Otenzepad

Clinical data
- Routes of administration: oral

Pharmacokinetic data
- Bioavailability: 45% (oral)
- Elimination half-life: 2.5h

Identifiers
- IUPAC name: 11-[2-[2-(diethylaminomethyl)piperidin-1-yl]acetyl]-5H-pyrido[2,3-b][1,4]benzodiazepin-6-one
- CAS Number: 102394-31-0
- PubChem CID: 107867
- IUPHAR/BPS: 309
- ChemSpider: 97004
- UNII: OM7J0XAL0S
- ChEBI: CHEBI:111174
- ChEMBL: ChEMBL17045
- CompTox Dashboard (EPA): DTXSID0045674
- ECHA InfoCard: 100.220.541

Chemical and physical data
- Formula: C_{24}H_{31}N_{5}O_{2}
- Molar mass: 421.545 g·mol^{−1}
- 3D model (JSmol): Interactive image
- SMILES: CCN(CC)CC1CCCCN1CC(=O)N2C3=CC=CC=C3C(=O)NC4=C2N=CC=C4
- InChI: InChI=1S/C24H31N5O2/c1-3-27(4-2)16-18-10-7-8-15-28(18)17-22(30)29-21-13-6-5-11-19(21)24(31)26-20-12-9-14-25-23(20)29/h5-6,9,11-14,18H,3-4,7-8,10,15-17H2,1-2H3,(H,26,31); Key:UBRKDAVQCKZSPO-UHFFFAOYSA-N

Otenzepad is a competitive muscarinic receptor antagonist that is relatively selective at the M2 receptor. It was investigated as a treatment for arrhythmia and bradycardia due to its cardioselectivity but research ceased after stage III clinical trials. The drug was originally developed by the German pharmaceutical company, Boehringer Ingelheim Pharma KG.

== Pharmacodynamics ==
The (+)-enantiomer has 8 times greater potency at the M2 receptor than the (-)-enantiomer.

Potency of Otenzepad at muscarinic receptor isoforms
mAChR isoform	Dissociation constant (K_{i})
M1	537.0 - 1300nM
M2	81.0 - 186nM
M3	838 - 2089.0nM
M4	407.0 - 1800nM
M5	2800nM

== See also ==
- Muscarinic antagonist
- Antiarrhythmic agent
