= Ganglionic blocker =

Medication type

A ganglionic blocker (or ganglioplegic) is a type of medication that inhibits transmission between preganglionic and postganglionic neurons in the autonomic nervous system, often by acting as a nicotinic receptor antagonist. Nicotinic acetylcholine receptors are found on skeletal muscle, but also within the route of transmission for the parasympathetic and sympathetic nervous system (which together comprise the autonomic nervous system). More specifically, nicotinic receptors are found within the ganglia of the autonomic nervous system, allowing outgoing signals to be transmitted from the presynaptic to the postsynaptic cells. Thus, for example, blocking nicotinic acetylcholine receptors blocks both sympathetic (excitatory) and parasympathetic (calming) stimulation of the heart. The nicotinic antagonist hexamethonium, for example, does this by blocking the transmission of outgoing signals across the autonomic ganglia at the postsynaptic nicotinic acetylcholine receptor.

Because ganglionic blockers block both the parasympathetic nervous system and sympathetic nervous system, the effect of these drugs depends upon the dominant tone in the organ system.

The opposite of a ganglionic blocker is referred to as a ganglionic stimulant. Some substances can exhibit both stimulating and blocking effects on autonomic ganglia, depending on dosage and/or duration of action. An example for such a "dual" action is nicotine, which does this via depolarization block (see classification below).

== Examples ==
The first ganglion-blocker to be used clinically was tetraethylammonium, although it was soon superseded by better drugs.

Nicotinic receptor antagonists:

- hexamethonium
- pentolinium
- mecamylamine
- trimetaphan
- tubocurarine
- pempidine
- benzohexonium
- chlorisondamine
- pentamine

Nicotinic receptor agonists (acting through depolarization block):

- nicotine

Blocking ACh release in autonomic ganglia (although these have many other actions elsewhere):

- botulinum toxin

== Uses ==
Ganglionic blockers are used less frequently now than they were in the past, because antihypertensives with fewer side effects are now available. Hexamethonium has been described as the "first effective antihypertensive drug". However, they are still used in some emergency situations, such as aortic dissection or autonomic dysreflexia.

== Side effects ==
- Cardiovascular: Orthostatic hypotension with or without reflex tachycardia
- ENT/glands: xerostomia, dry eyes, blurred vision, reduced bronchial secretion, hypohidrosis
- GIT: gastroparesis, constipation, urinary retention
- Sexual dysfunction: failure of erection and ejaculation
- in overdose risk of peripheral circulatory collapse (shock) and paralytic ileus

== See also ==
- Neuromuscular-blocking drug
