= Pentamine =

Chemical compound

Identifiers
- IUPAC name: Ethyl-[2-[2-(ethyl-dimethyl-ammonio)ethyl-methyl-amino]ethyl]-dimethyl-ammonium
- CAS Number: 60-30-0
- PubChem CID: 9383
- ChemSpider: 9014
- UNII: 43XK6AW58D
- CompTox Dashboard (EPA): DTXSID30861863

Chemical and physical data
- Formula: C_{13}H_{33}N_{3}
- Molar mass: 231.428 g·mol^{−1}
- 3D model (JSmol): Interactive image
- SMILES: CC[N+](C)(C)CCN(C)CC[N+](C)(C)CC
- InChI: InChI=1S/C13H33N3/c1-8-15(4,5)12-10-14(3)11-13-16(6,7)9-2/h8-13H2,1-7H3/q+2; Key:NHWGPUVJQFTOQX-UHFFFAOYSA-N

Pentamine is a pharmaceutical drug that acts as a ganglionic blocker.
