= Antisialagogue =

Drugs that decrease the flow rate of saliva

Antisialagogues are drugs or substances that decrease the flow rate of saliva and their effect is opposite to that of sialagogues. Their origin may be both natural and synthetic.

Anticholinergics generally have antisialagogue effects, and most produce some level of sedation, both being advantageous in surgical procedures.

Classic antisialagogues include:

- atropine,
- opioids,
- alkalis,
- hyoscyamine,
- scopolamine,
- tobacco in excess,
- most cannabinoids,
- all nauseous or insipid substances.
