= Cyamemazine =

Antipsychotic medication

Clinical data
- Trade names: Tercian
- AHFS/Drugs.com: International Drug Names
- Routes of administration: Oral, IM, IV
- ATC code: N05AA06 (WHO)

Legal status
- Legal status: In general: ℞ (Prescription only)

Pharmacokinetic data
- Bioavailability: 10-70%
- Metabolism: Hepatic
- Elimination half-life: 10 hours
- Excretion: Urine

Identifiers
- IUPAC name: 10-(3-dimethylamino-2-methyl-propyl)phenothiazine-2-carbonitrile
- CAS Number: 3546-03-0
- PubChem CID: 62865
- IUPHAR/BPS: 84
- DrugBank: DB09000
- ChemSpider: 56597
- UNII: A2JGV5CNU4
- KEGG: D07307
- ChEMBL: ChEMBL2104153
- CompTox Dashboard (EPA): DTXSID80863190
- ECHA InfoCard: 100.020.541

Chemical and physical data
- Formula: C_{19}H_{21}N_{3}S
- Molar mass: 323.46 g·mol^{−1}
- 3D model (JSmol): Interactive image
- SMILES: N#Cc2cc1N(c3c(Sc1cc2)cccc3)CC(C)CN(C)C
- InChI: InChI=1S/C19H21N3S/c1-14(12-21(2)3)13-22-16-6-4-5-7-18(16)23-19-9-8-15(11-20)10-17(19)22/h4-10,14H,12-13H2,1-3H3; Key:SLFGIOIONGJGRT-UHFFFAOYSA-N

Cyamemazine (Tercian), also known as cyamepromazine, is a typical antipsychotic drug of the phenothiazine class which was introduced by Theraplix in France in 1972 and later in Portugal as well.

== Medical use ==
It is used for the treatment of schizophrenia and, especially, for psychosis-associated anxiety, due to its unique anxiolytic efficacy.

It is also used to reduce anxiety associated with benzodiazepine withdrawal syndrome and anxiety in depression with suicidal tendency.

== Side effects ==
Here are some of the most common side effects and related incidence:

- Sedation (20%)
- Vertigo (7.9%)
- Constipation (4%)
- Dyskinesia (4.4%)
- Dryness of mouth (5.9%)
- Hypotension (7.4%)
- Tachycardia (3.2%)

== Mechanism ==
Cyamemazine differs from other phenothiazine neuroleptics in that aside from the usual profile of dopamine, α_{1}-adrenergic, H_{1}, and mACh receptor antagonism, it additionally produces potent blockade of several serotonin receptors, including 5-HT_{2A}, 5-HT_{2C}, and 5-HT_{7}. These actions have been implicated in cyamemazine's anxiolytic effects (5-HT_{2C}) and lack of extrapyramidal side effects (5-HT_{2A}), and despite being classified as a typical antipsychotic, it actually behaves like an atypical antipsychotic.

Site	K_{i} (nM)	Species	Ref
H_{1}	9.3	Guinea pig	
H_{2}	351	Guinea pig	
H_{3}	10000+	Rat	
M_{1}	13	Human	
M_{2}	42	Human	
M_{3}	32	Human	
M_{4}	12	Human	
M_{5}	35	Human	
5-HT_{1A}	517	Human	
5-HT_{2A}	1.5	Human	
5-HT_{2C}	12	Human	
5-HT_{3}	2943	Human	
5-HT_{7}	22	Human	
D_{1}	3.8	Human	
D_{2}	5.8	Human	
D_{3}	2.5	Human	
D_{4}	5.3	Human	
α_{1}	2.3	Rat	
α_{2}	1320	Rat	
GABA_{A}	10000+	Rat	
GABA_{B}	10000+	Rat	
Values are K_{i} (nM). The smaller the value, the more strongly the drug binds to the site.

== Synthesis ==
Synthesis: Patent:

2-Cyanophenothiazine [38642-74-9] (1) 3-Chloro-2-methylpropyl(dimethyl)amine [23349-86-2] (2)
