= Muscle-type nicotinic receptor =

The muscle-type nicotinic receptor is a type of nicotinic acetylcholine receptor consisting of the subunit combination (α1)_{2}β1δε (adult receptor) or (α1)_{2}β1δγ (fetal receptor). These receptors are found in neuromuscular junctions, where activation leads to an excitatory postsynaptic potential (EPSP), mainly by increased Na^{+} and K^{+} permeability.

== Activation ==
Tetraethylammonium (TEA) is a molecule found to be a weak agonist of the muscle‐type nicotinic receptor. Since receptor activation occurs as isolated bursts, it has been proposed that the receptors have a very low channel‐opening rate constant when bound to TEA.

== Inhibition ==
Lidocaine, a local anesthetic, has multiple inhibitory actions on the receptor and analysis of the structure of lidocaine has identified the presence of a hydrophobic aromatic ring and a hydrophilic terminal amine. Diethylamine (DEA), a molecule that mimics the hydrophilic moiety of lidocaine by way of a positively charged amine, has been found to block the channel when the receptor is open restricting the flow of Na^{+} and K^{+} ions. 2,6-Dimethylaniline (DMA), a molecule that mimics the hydrophobic moiety of lidocaine, has been found to bind the receptor at inter-subunit crevices of the trans-membrane spanning domain thereby causing non-competitive inhibition and restricting the channel from opening.

Benzocaine and tetracaine are also local anesthetics that have an inhibitory effect on the muscle‐type nicotinic receptor. Benzocaine is a permanently uncharged species that inhibits the receptor by plugging the pore of the opened channel. Tetracaine is a permanently positively charged species. It can bind to the receptor at different sites in both the open and closed conformations. Both of these local anesthetics enhance nAChR desensitization.

== Ligands ==
=== Agonist ===
- Acetylcholine

=== Partial Agonists ===
- Carbachol
- Suxamethonium

=== Antagonists ===
- α-Bungarotoxin
- α-Conotoxin
- Hexamethonium
- Pancuronium
- Tubocurarine

== See also ==
- Nicotinic acetylcholine receptor
- Ganglion type nicotinic receptor
