= Dimethylphenylpiperazine =

Dimethylphenylpiperazine (DMPP) may refer to:

- Dimethylphenylpiperazinium (DMPP)
- 2,3-Dimethylphenylpiperazine (2,3-DMPP; PAL-218)
- 2,4-Dimethylphenylpiperazine (2,4-DMPP)
- 2,5-Dimethylphenylpiperazine (2,5-DMPP)
- 3,4-Dimethylphenylpiperazine (3,4-DMPP)

== See also ==
- Substituted phenylpiperazine
