= Horace Smirk =

New Zealand professor of medicine

Sir Frederick Horace Smirk KBE (12 December 1902 – 18 May 1991) was a New Zealand professor of medicine and researcher in hypertension.

== Early life and education ==
Smirk was born in Accrington, Lancashire, England, in 1902. He attended Haslingden School and Victoria University of Manchester where he graduated with MBChB in 1925 and MD in 1927.

== Career ==
After graduation Smirk received scholarships for research including a Beit fellowship which enabled him to do three years of research at University College London. There he worked with Thomas Lewis, John McMichael and T.R. Elliott who stimulated his interest in clinical and laboratory research. In 1936 he became professor of pharmacology at the University of Cairo where he developed an interest in blood pressure and hypertension. In 1940 he took up a chair in medicine at the University of Otago.

Continuing his research into hypertension Smirk concluded that in the early stages it was physiological but later pathological and that it was damaging. This led him to search for drug treatments in particular the effectiveness of hexamethonium in lowering blood pressure. It was administered by injection and while it had severe side effects such as postural hypotension it was found to be successful. He continued his research into hypertension and arrhythmias for the rest of his career and had an international reputation.

Smirk served on the WHO committee on hypertension and was a founder member of the group which developed into the International Society of Hypertension. He wrote 160 scientific articles.

== Honours and awards ==
In the 1958 Queen's Birthday Honours, Smirk was appointed a Knight Commander of the Order of the British Empire. He was awarded two honorary doctorates: one from the Hahnemann Medical College in Philadelphia in 1961 and the other from the University of Otago in 1975. He received a Canada Gairdner International Award in 1965.

== Personal life ==
Smirk married Aileen Bamforth in Salford in 1931. They had three sons and one daughter.

He died on 18 May 1991 in Dunedin.

== Selected publications ==
- Restall, P.A., Smirk F.H. (1950). "The treatment of high blood pressure with hexamethonium iodide." N Z Med J. 49 (271):206-9. PMID: 15439685.
- Smirk, F. Horace (1951). "Methonium Halides in High Blood Pressure". Science. 114 (2949): 4–5. doi:10.1126/science.114.29.
- Smirk, F.Horace (1952). "HYPOTENSIVE ACTIONS OF HEXAMETHONIUM BROMIDE AND SOME OF ITS HOMOLOGUES". The Lancet. 260 (6743): 1002–1005. doi:10.1016/S0140-6736(52)91181-1. ISSN 0140-6736.
- Smirk, F. H. (1957). High arterial pressure. Blackwell Scientific Publications.
- Smirk, F.H. (1959). "Basic Principles of Hypotensive Therapy". Postgraduate Medicine. 25 (1): 11–17. doi:10.1080/00325481.1959.11712310.
