= Theraplix =

Pharmaceutical company

Theraplix is a European pharmaceutical company. Founded in 1931 by the pharmacist François Albert-Buisson, It is now a subsidiary of Sanofi.

One of their products is the antipsychotic cyamemazine (Tercian).

Their products include: Amidezel, Diamex, Hexomedine Solution, Cathomycine, Kanamylone, Theraleneand Trecator. In the 1960s, they distributed gifts to physicians in the form of collage cards. They were mostly of Asian subjects and were suitable for framing.
