= Methoctramine =

Chemical compound

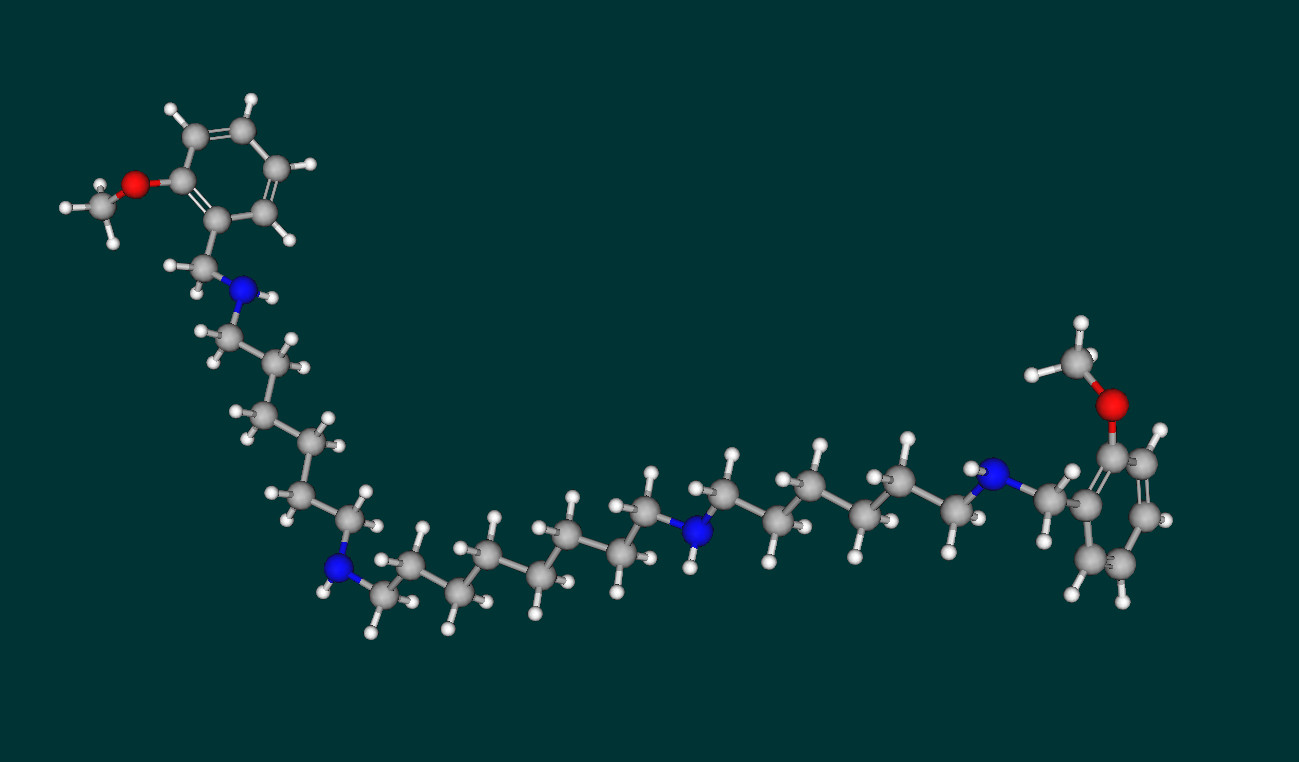

Legal status
- Legal status: US: Only for research

Identifiers
- IUPAC name: N, N'-bis[6-[(2-methoxybenzyl)amino]hexyl]-1, 8-octanediamine
- CAS Number: 104807-46-7
- PubChem CID: 4108
- IUPHAR/BPS: 327
- ChemSpider: 3965
- UNII: RLO2T99XT3
- ChEBI: CHEBI:73339
- CompTox Dashboard (EPA): DTXSID50960286 DTXSID90657547, DTXSID50960286

Chemical and physical data
- Formula: C_{36}H_{62}N_{4}O_{2}
- Molar mass: 582.918 g·mol^{−1}
- 3D model (JSmol): Interactive image
- Solubility in water: 20 g/l mg/mL (20 °C)
- SMILES: COC1=CC=CC=C1CNCCCCCCNCCCCCCCCNCCCCCCNCC2=CC=CC=C2OC
- InChI: InChI=1S/C36H62N4O2/c1-41-35-23-13-11-21-33(35)31-39-29-19-9-7-17-27-37-25-15-5-3-4-6-16-26-38-28-18-8-10-20-30-40-32-34-22-12-14-24-36(34)42-2/h11-14,21-24,37-40H,3-10,15-20,25-32H2,1-2H3

Methoctramine is a polymethylene tetraamine that acts as a muscarinic antagonist. It preferentially binds to the pre-synaptic receptor M2, a muscarinic acetylcholine ganglionic protein complex present basically in heart cells. In normal conditions -absence of methoctramine-, the activation of M2 receptors diminishes the speed of conduction of the sinoatrial and atrioventricular nodes thus reducing the heart rate. Thanks to its apparently high cardioselectivity, it has been studied as a potential parasymphatolitic drug, particularly against bradycardia. However, currently it is only addressed for research purposes, since the administration to humans is still unavailable.

== Chemistry ==
=== Mechanism of action ===
Methoctramine has been shown to competitively antagonize muscarinic receptors, thus preventing them from binding to the neurotransmitter acetylcholine (and other agonists, such as bethanechol or berberine). At higher concentrations, allosteric properties of methoctramine have also been described.

Biochemical literature distinguishes 5 different types of muscarinic receptors, each of one having a different affinity to methoctramine:

Muscarinic receptor subtype	M1	M2	M3	M4	M5
Affinity constants (nM) in Chinese hamster ovary cells.	50	13.2	214	31.6	135

The lower the affinity constants are, the more affinity exists.

As shown in the chart above, methoctramine binds preferently to M2 receptors, found mostly in the parasympathetic nerves and atria. There, the activity it develops is clearly related to the contraction process. In presence of acetylcholine, M2 receptors are believed to play an autoinhibitory role in the atria, triggering processes that prevent contraction from occurring. Hence, the presence of the antagonist methoctramine provokes an increase of the heart rate.

In marked contrast of the above, methoctramine has the opposite function in other organs: it inhibits contraction. This occurs especially in the bladder, where, unlike the heart, autoinhibitory processes of this type do not exist.

Recent research, however, led to find the mentioned specialty dubious, rising the possibility of it binding to other types of receptors, such as nicotinic ACh receptors –at micromolar concentrations- or adenosine A3.

== Effects ==
The exact effects of methoctramine still remain unknown. However, the few experiments conducted have led to relate this molecule to the following:

- Reduction of bladder contractions in a concentration-dependent manner, resulting in a decrease of the urinary excretion.
- Responsible for decrease in sexual activity, as a study using rats confirmed.
- Downregulation of ornithine decarboxylase, an enzyme responsible for a step in the synthesis of polyamines.
- Limited upregulation of spermine/spermidine N-acetyltransferase.

== Uses ==
Still object of investigation, methoctramine has not been introduced in the pharmacological industry yet. Research conducted in mice (and other animals), suggests nonetheless many clinical uses of it, thanks to its implications in contraction processes. These applications include, but are not limited to:

- Combat bladder overactivity, because it triggers effects that enhance its relaxation.
- Memory improvements in cognitively impaired patients.
- Control of bradycardia.
- Control of bronchodilatation.

== Toxicity ==
Methoctramine was shown to produce some cytotoxic effects, being the cardiomyoblasts the most sensitive cells reported. Cell death occurs only at high micromolar concentrations (being the average pharmacological dose at nanomolar level). From all the methoctramine-derived polymers, those with more spacing between the inner nitrogen atoms were shown to have the lowest lethal doses.

This mentioned toxicity has its origin in a non-muscarinic mechanism, and bears a strong resemblance to other anticholinergic drugs, such as gallamine.

There’s evidence that lithium could act as an antidote against methoctramine.

== See also ==
- Gallamine triethiodide
- M2 receptor
- Muscarinic receptor
- Acetylcholine
