= Anticholinergic =

Parasympathetic nervous system inhibitors

An anticholinergic or anticholinergic agent is a type of substance that blocks the action of the acetylcholine (ACh) neurotransmitter at synapses in the central and peripheral nervous system.

These agents inhibit the parasympathetic nervous system by selectively blocking the binding of ACh to its receptor in nerve cells. The nerve fibers of the parasympathetic system are responsible for the involuntary movement of smooth muscles present in the gastrointestinal tract, urinary tract, lungs, sweat glands, and many other parts of the body.

In broad terms, anticholinergics are divided into two categories in accordance with their specific targets in the central and peripheral nervous system and at the neuromuscular junction: antimuscarinic agents and antinicotinic agents (ganglionic blockers, neuromuscular blockers).

The term "anticholinergic" is typically used to refer to antimuscarinics that competitively inhibit the binding of ACh to muscarinic acetylcholine receptors; such agents do not antagonize the binding at nicotinic acetylcholine receptors at the neuromuscular junction, although the term is sometimes used to refer to agents that do so.

== Medical uses ==
Anticholinergic drugs are used to treat a variety of conditions:

- Dizziness (including vertigo and motion sickness-related symptoms)
- Extrapyramidal symptoms, a potential side-effect of antipsychotic medications
- Gastrointestinal disorders (e.g., peptic ulcers, diarrhea, pylorospasm, diverticulitis, ulcerative colitis, nausea, and vomiting)
- Genitourinary disorders (e.g., cystitis, urethritis, and prostatitis)
- Insomnia, although usually only on a short-term basis
- Respiratory disorders (e.g., asthma, chronic bronchitis, and chronic obstructive pulmonary disease [COPD])
- Sinus bradycardia due to a hypersensitive vagus nerve
- Organophosphate based nerve agent poisoning, such as VX, sarin, tabun, and soman (atropine is favoured in conjunction with an oxime, usually pralidoxime)

Anticholinergics generally have antisialagogue effects (decreasing saliva production), and most produce some level of sedation, both being advantageous in surgical procedures.

Until the beginning of the 20th century, anticholinergic drugs were widely used to treat psychiatric disorders.

== Physiological effects ==
Effects of anticholinergic drugs include:

- Delirium (often with hallucinations and delusions indistinguishable from reality)
- Ocular symptoms (from eye drops): mydriasis, pupil dilation, and acute angle-closure glaucoma in those with shallow anterior chamber
- Anhidrosis, dry mouth, dry skin
- Fever
- Constipation
- Tachycardia
- Urinary retention
- Cutaneous vasodilation

Clinically the most significant feature is delirium, particularly in the elderly, who are most likely to be affected by the toxidrome.

== Cognitive and physical decline ==
Long-term use may increase the risk of both cognitive and physical decline. It is unclear whether they affect the risk of death generally. However, in older adults they do appear to increase the risk of death.

As well as well-known anticholinergic medicines, adverse anticholinergic effects can also occur from medications with other mechanism focuses. The anticholinergic burden (ACB) approach examines this risk.

== Side effects ==
Possible effects of anticholinergics include:

- Poor coordination
- Dementia
- Decreased mucus production in the nose and throat; consequent dry, sore throat
- Dry mouth with possible acceleration of dental caries
- Cessation of sweating; consequent decreased epidermal thermal dissipation leading to warm, blotchy, or red skin
- Increased body temperature
- Pupil dilation; consequent sensitivity to bright light (photophobia)
- Loss of accommodation (loss of focusing ability, blurred vision – cycloplegia)
- Double vision
- Increased heart rate
- Tendency to be easily startled
- Urinary retention
- Urinary incontinence while sleeping
- Diminished bowel movement, sometimes ileus (decreases motility via the vagus nerve)
- Increased intraocular pressure; dangerous for people with narrow-angle glaucoma

Possible effects in the central nervous system resemble those associated with delirium, and may include:

- Confusion
- Disorientation
- Agitation
- Euphoria or dysphoria
- Respiratory depression
- Memory problems
- Inability to concentrate
- Wandering thoughts; inability to sustain a train of thought
- Incoherent speech
- Irritability
- Mental confusion (brain fog)
- Wakeful myoclonic jerking
- Unusual sensitivity to sudden sounds
- Illogical thinking
- Photophobia
- Visual disturbances
  - Periodic flashes of light
  - Periodic changes in visual field
  - Visual snow
  - Restricted or "tunnel vision"
- Visual, auditory, or other sensory hallucinations
  - Warping or waving of surfaces and edges
  - Textured surfaces
  - "Dancing" lines; "spiders", insects; form constants
  - Lifelike objects indistinguishable from reality
  - Phantom smoking
  - Hallucinated presence of people not actually there (e.g. shadow people)
- Rarely: seizures, coma, and death
- Orthostatic hypotension (severe drop in systolic blood pressure when standing up suddenly) and significantly increased risk of falls in the elderly population

Older patients are at a higher risk of experiencing CNS side effects. The link possible between anticholinergic medication use and cognitive decline/dementia has been noted in weaker observational studies. Although there is no strong evidence from randomized controlled trials to suggest that these medications should be avoided, clinical guidelines suggest that a consideration be made to decrease the use of these medications if safe to do so and the use of these medications be carefully considered to reduce any possible adverse effects including cognitive decline.

=== Toxicity ===
An acute anticholinergic syndrome is reversible and subsides once all of the causative agents have been excreted. Reversible acetylcholinesterase inhibitor agents such as physostigmine can be used as an antidote in life-threatening cases. Wider use is discouraged due to the significant side effects related to cholinergic excess including seizures, muscle weakness, bradycardia, bronchoconstriction, lacrimation, salivation, bronchorrhea, vomiting, and diarrhea. Even in documented cases of anticholinergic toxicity, seizures have been reported after the rapid administration of physostigmine. Asystole has occurred after physostigmine administration for tricyclic antidepressant overdose, so a conduction delay (QRS > 0.10 second) or suggestion of tricyclic antidepressant ingestion is generally considered a contraindication to physostigmine administration.

=== Dementia ===
A 2025 study carried out by experts from the University of Nottingham and funded by the National Institute for Health Research (NIHR) has shown there to be an increased risk of up to 50% of patients developing Dementia due to some of these medications and cautions have been advised with their use. The study findings showed increased risks of dementia for anticholinergic drugs overall and specifically for the anticholinergic antidepressants, antipsychotic drugs, antiparkinsons drugs, bladder drugs and epilepsy drugs after accounting for other risk factors for dementia.

However, in a March 2025 article published in the American Journal of Epidemiology, Aguado and colleagues reported that anticholinergic antihypertensive medications reduced individuals' 10-year risk of incident vascular dementia by 31% when used for ≥6 years compared to 3–6 years (risk ratio, 0.69; 95% CI, 0.54–0.90); the comparative risk of Alzheimer's disease was reduced, as well, but not to a statistically significant degree (risk ratio, 0.91; 95% CI, 0.77–1.10).

== Pharmacology ==
Anticholinergics are classified according to the receptors that are affected:

- Antimuscarinic agents operate on the muscarinic acetylcholine receptors. The majority of anticholinergic drugs are antimuscarinics.
- Antinicotinic agents operate on the nicotinic acetylcholine receptors. The majority of these are non-depolarising skeletal muscle relaxants for surgical use that are structurally related to curare. Several are depolarizing agents.

== Examples ==
Examples of common anticholinergics:

- Antimuscarinic agents
  - Amitriptyline, the most anticholinergic compound of the tricyclic antidepressants
  - Amoxapine, a tetracyclic antidepressant that is also a metabolite of loxapine, an antipsychotic
  - Antipsychotics (clozapine, quetiapine)
  - Atropine
  - Benztropine
  - Biperiden
  - Chlorpheniramine
  - Certain SSRIs (Paroxetine)
  - Dicyclomine (Dicycloverine)
  - Dimenhydrinate
  - Diphenhydramine
  - Doxepin
  - Doxylamine
  - Flavoxate
  - Glycopyrronium/-late
  - Hyoscyamine
  - Ipratropium
  - Orphenadrine
  - Oxitropium
  - Oxybutynin
  - Promethazine
  - Propantheline bromide
  - Scopolamine
  - Solifenacin
  - Tolterodine
  - Tiotropium
  - Tricyclic antidepressants with tertiary amines, like imipramine, clomipramine, and amitriptyline, tend to have stronger anticholinergic properties than equivalent secondary amines.
  - Trihexyphenidyl
  - Tropatepine
  - Tropicamide
  - Umeclidinium
- Antinicotinic agents
  - Bupropion – Ganglion blocker
  - Dextromethorphan - Cough suppressant and ganglion blocker
  - Doxacurium – Nondepolarizing skeletal muscular relaxant
  - Hexamethonium – Ganglion blocker
  - Mecamylamine – Ganglion blocker and occasional smoking cessation aid
  - Tubocurarine – Nondepolarizing skeletal muscular relaxant

=== Antidotes ===
Physostigmine is one of only a few drugs that can be used as an antidote for anticholinergic poisoning. Nicotine also counteracts anticholinergics by activating nicotinic acetylcholine receptors. Caffeine (although an adenosine receptor antagonist) can counteract the anticholinergic symptoms by reducing sedation and increasing acetylcholine activity, thereby causing alertness and arousal.

== Psychoactive uses ==
When a significant amount of an anticholinergic is taken into the body, a toxic reaction known as acute anticholinergic syndrome may result. This may happen accidentally or intentionally as a consequence of either recreational or entheogenic drug use, though many users find the side effects to be exceedingly unpleasant and not worth the recreational effects they experience. In the context of recreational use, anticholinergics are often called deliriants.

== Plant sources ==
The most common plants containing anticholinergic alkaloids (including atropine, scopolamine, and hyoscyamine among others) are:

- Atropa belladonna (deadly nightshade)
- Brugmansia species
- Datura species
- Garrya species
- Hyoscyamus niger (henbane)
- Mandragora officinarum (mandrake)

== Use as a deterrent ==
Several narcotic and opiate-containing drug preparations, such as those containing hydrocodone and codeine are combined with an anticholinergic agent to deter intentional misuse. Examples include hydrocodone/homatropine (Tussigon, Hydromet, Hycodan), diphenoxylate/atropine (Lomotil), and hydrocodone polistirex/chlorpheniramine polistirex (Tussionex Pennkinetic, TussiCaps). However, it is noted that opioid/antihistamine combinations are used clinically for their synergistic effect in the management of pain and maintenance of dissociative anesthesia (sedation) in such preparations as meperidine/promethazine (Mepergan) and dipipanone/cyclizine (Diconal), which act as strong anticholinergic agents. Paradoxically, some opioid/antihistamine combinations, such as promethazine/codeine, are often utilized recreationally.
