= AFDX-384 =

Chemical compound

Identifiers
- IUPAC name: N-(2-[(2R)-2-[(dipropylamino)methyl]piperidin-1-yl]ethyl)-6-oxo-5H-pyrido[2,3-b][1,4]benzodiazepine-11-carboxamide
- CAS Number: 118290-27-0
- PubChem CID: 119357
- ChemSpider: 26233613
- ChEBI: CHEBI:73338
- CompTox Dashboard (EPA): DTXSID60922653

Chemical and physical data
- Formula: C_{27}H_{38}N_{6}O_{2}
- Molar mass: 478.641 g·mol^{−1}
- 3D model (JSmol): Interactive image
- SMILES: O=C1Nc2cccnc2N(c4c1cccc4)C(=O)NCCN3CCCCC3CN(CCC)CCC
- InChI: InChI=1S/C27H38N6O2/c1-3-16-31(17-4-2)20-21-10-7-8-18-32(21)19-15-29-27(35)33-24-13-6-5-11-22(24)26(34)30-23-12-9-14-28-25(23)33/h5-6,9,11-14,21H,3-4,7-8,10,15-20H2,1-2H3,(H,29,35)(H,30,34)/t21-/m1/s1; Key:MZDYABXXPZNUCT-OAQYLSRUSA-N

AFDX-384 (BIBN-161) is a drug which acts as a selective antagonist of the muscarinic acetylcholine receptors, with selectivity for the M_{2} and M_{4} subtypes. It is used mainly for mapping the distribution of M_{2} and M_{4} muscarinic receptors in the brain, and studying their involvement in the development and treatment of dementia and schizophrenia.

== See also ==
- Pirenzepine (M_{1} selective antagonist)
