= 4-DAMP =

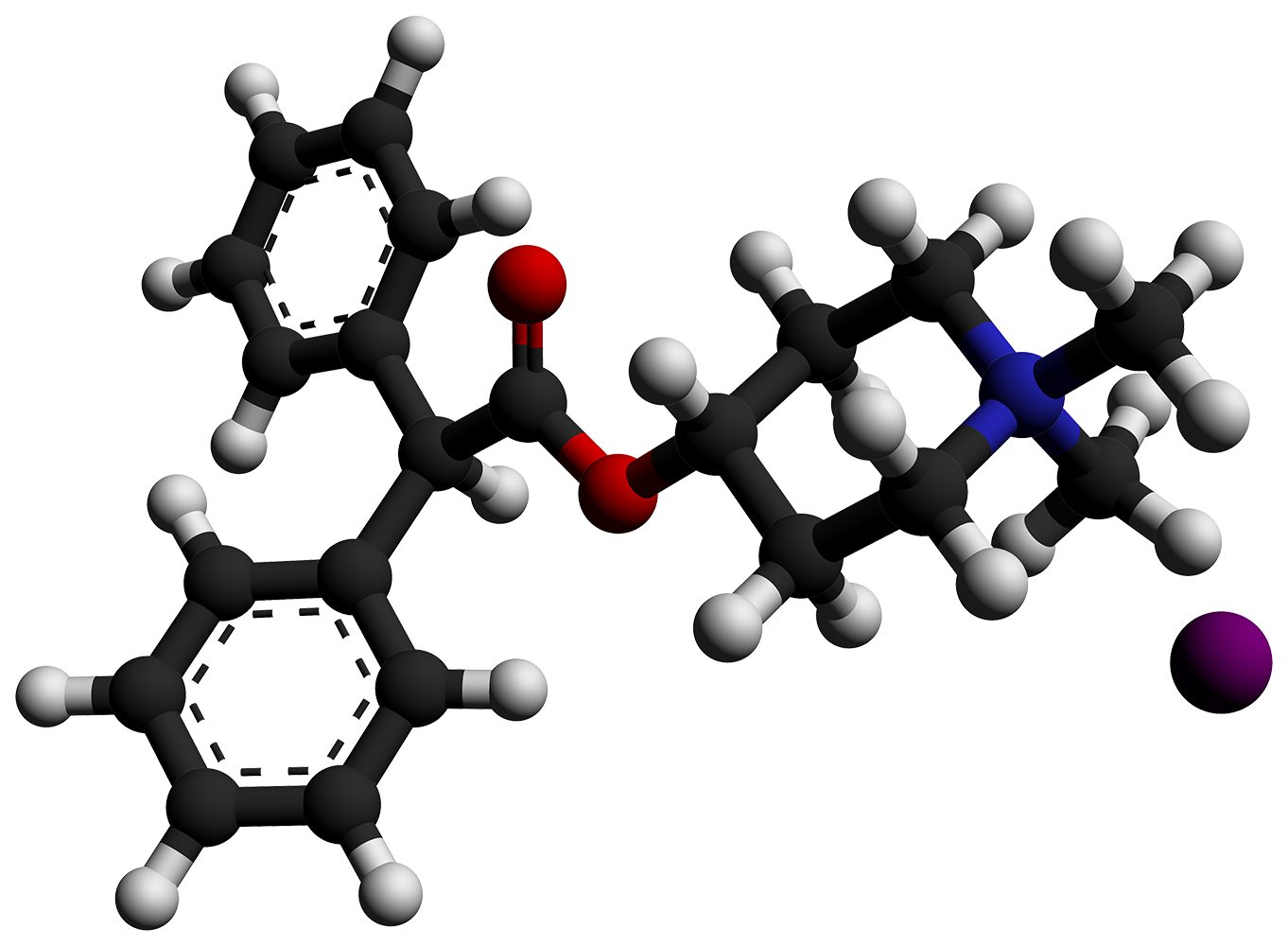

Names
- Preferred IUPAC name 4-[(Diphenylacetyl)oxy]-1,1-dimethylpiperidin-1-ium iodide
- Other names 4-(2,2-Diphenylacetoxy)-1,1-dimethylpiperidin-1-ium iodide

Identifiers
CAS Number	1952-15-4
3D model (JSmol)	Interactive image
ChemSpider	2282596
PubChem CID	3014059
UNII	CP6GVV66RG
CompTox Dashboard (EPA)	DTXSID40941281
- InChI: InChI=1S/C21H26NO2.HI/c1-22(2)15-13-19(14-16-22)24-21(23)20(17-9-5-3-6-10-17)18-11-7-4-8-12-18;/h3-12,19-20H,13-16H2,1-2H3;1H/q+1;/p-1 Key: WWJHRSCUAQPFQO-UHFFFAOYSA-M
- SMILES: [I-].C[N+]1(C)CCC(CC1)OC(=O)C(C1=CC=CC=C1)C1=CC=CC=C1

Properties
Chemical formula	C_{21}H_{26}INO_{2}
Molar mass	451.348 g·mol^{−1}
Appearance	White to beige powder
- Except where otherwise noted, data are given for materials in their standard state (at 25 °C [77 °F], 100 kPa). Infobox references

4-DAMP (1,1-dimethyl-4-diphenylacetoxypiperidinium iodide) is a selective muscarinic acetylcholine receptor (mAChR) M_{3} antagonist. It is also able to antagonize M_{1} receptors but has preferential activity at the M_{3} receptor. It competitively binds to the acetylcholine binding site on mAChRs, causing right-ward shift in the dose response curves for mAChR agonists.
