= Trihexyphenidyl =

Antispasmodic drug

- Molecular structure of trihexyphenidyl

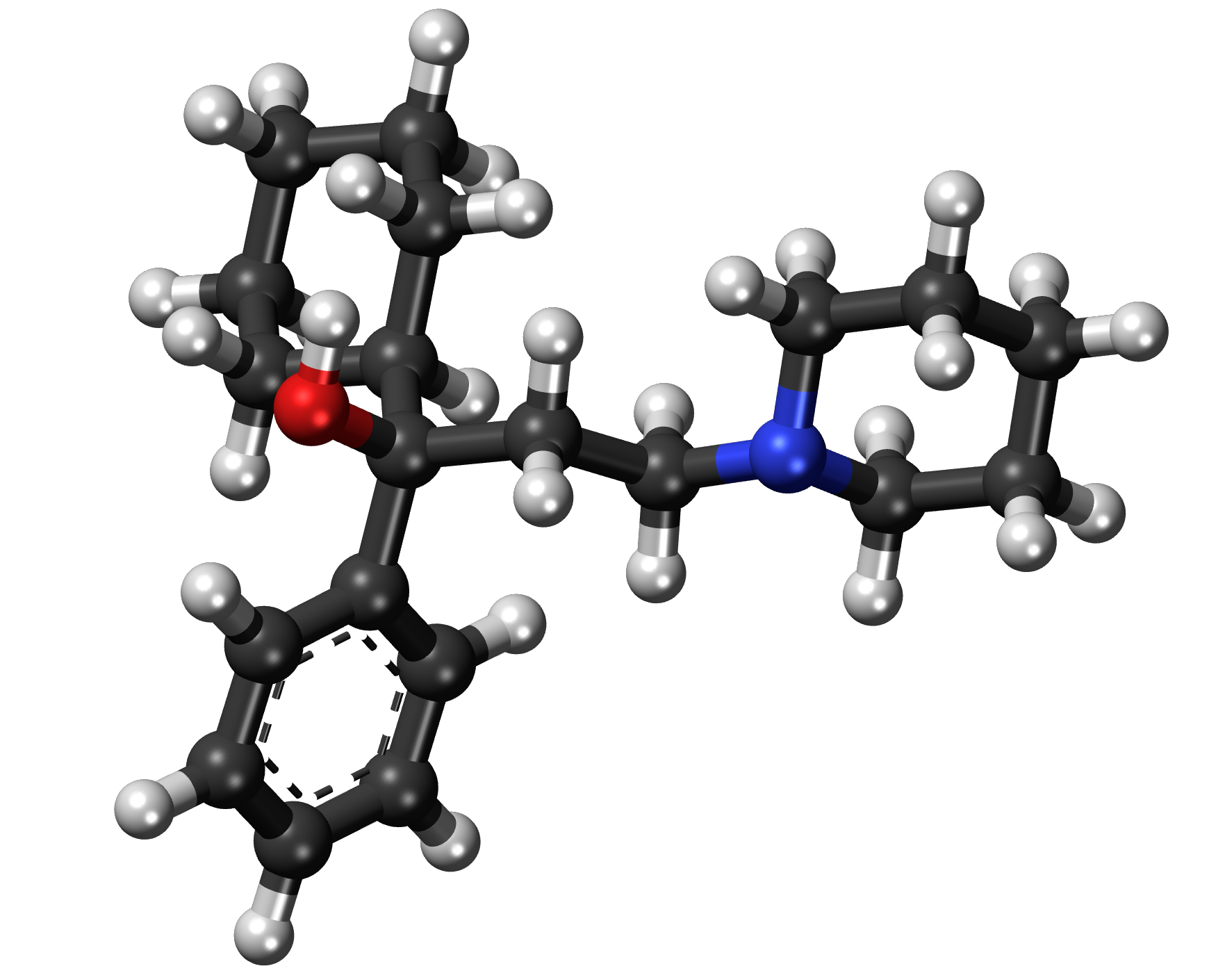
- 3D representation of a trihexyphenidyl molecule

Clinical data
- Trade names: Artane, Parkin, Pacitane, Hexymer
- AHFS/Drugs.com: Monograph
- MedlinePlus: a682160
- License data: US DailyMed: Trihexyphenidyl
- Pregnancy category: AU: B1
- Routes of administration: Oral
- ATC code: N04AA01 (WHO)

Legal status
- Legal status: AU: S8 (Controlled drug); BR: Class B1 (Psychoactive drugs); US: ℞-only

Pharmacokinetic data
- Elimination half-life: 3.3-4.1 hours

Identifiers
- IUPAC name: (RS)-1-Cyclohexyl-1-phenyl-3-(1-piperidyl)propan-1-ol
- CAS Number: 144-11-6
- PubChem CID: 5572
- IUPHAR/BPS: 7315
- DrugBank: DB00376
- ChemSpider: 5371
- UNII: 6RC5V8B7PO
- KEGG: D08638
- ChEMBL: ChEMBL1490
- CompTox Dashboard (EPA): DTXSID4023705
- ECHA InfoCard: 100.005.105

Chemical and physical data
- Formula: C_{20}H_{31}NO
- Molar mass: 301.474 g·mol^{−1}
- 3D model (JSmol): Interactive image
- SMILES: OC(c1ccccc1)(CCN2CCCCC2)C3CCCCC3
- InChI: InChI=1S/C20H31NO/c22-20(18-10-4-1-5-11-18,19-12-6-2-7-13-19)14-17-21-15-8-3-9-16-21/h1,4-5,10-11,19,22H,2-3,6-9,12-17H2; Key:HWHLPVGTWGOCJO-UHFFFAOYSA-N

Trihexyphenidyl (THP, benzhexol, trihex, gilining marketed as Artane and others) is an antispasmodic drug used to treat stiffness, tremors, spasms, and poor muscle control. It is an agent of the antimuscarinic class and is often used in management of Parkinson's disease. It was approved by the FDA for the treatment of Parkinson's in the US in 1949.

Trihexyphenidyl is a therapeutic alternative on the World Health Organization's List of Essential Medicines.

== Medical uses ==
Trihexyphenidyl is used for the symptomatic treatment of Parkinson's disease in mono and combination therapy.

Trihexyphenidyl has also been prescribed for essential tremor and akathisia.

In pediatrics, it has been used for children with dystonia due to cerebral palsy, and to control drooling.

In organophosphate poisoning, trihexyphenidyl is a more effective antidote than atropine to counteract the cholinergic crisis, seizures, and neuropathology.

== Contraindications ==
Contraindications include according to the Therapeutic Goods Administration Australia from 2022:

- Hypersensitivity to trihexyphenidyl
- Narrow angle glaucoma
- Ileus (disruption of the normal propulsive ability of the intestine)
- Caution: People with obstructive diseases of the urogenital tract, people with a known history of seizures and those with potentially dangerous tachycardia

== Adverse effects ==
Dose-dependent side effects are frequent, but typically lessen over time as the body adapts to the medication. All of the following symptoms considered, Artane has been shown to dramatically and consistently improve neurologic defects in people aged 16–86 over the course of five years. People who are older or who have psychiatric conditions may become confused or develop delirium. Side effects include but are not limited to:

- Central nervous system: drowsiness, vertigo, headache, and dizziness are frequent. With high doses nervousness, agitation, anxiety, delirium, and confusion are noted. Trihexyphenidyl may be abused due to a short acting mood-elevating and euphoric effect. The normal sleep architecture may be altered (REM sleep depression). Trihexyphenidyl may lower the seizure-threshold.
- Peripheral side effects: dry mouth, impaired sweating, abdominal discomfort, nausea, and constipation are frequent. Tachycardia or heart palpitations (fast heart rate) may be noted. Allergic reactions are rare, but may occur. Many of these peripheral symptoms, especially considering an acute increase in anxiety with various physical complaints, as well as evidence of orthostatic hypotension and tachycardia are indicative of withdrawal, especially in people with psychiatric conditions
- Eyes: trihexyphenidyl causes mydriasis with or without photophobia. It may precipitate narrow angle glaucoma or cause blurred vision.
- Tolerance may develop during therapy which requires dose adjustments.
- Striated musculature and weight gain.

== Overdose ==
Trihexyphenidyl and other antiparkinsonian drugs are known to be substances of abuse. This is true both in abusers of other substances and in chronic schizophrenics, the latter being infrequent abusers of other drugs.

Overdose mimics an atropine intoxication with dryness of mucous membranes, red face, bowel and bladder paralysis, and hyperthermia in high doses. Central nervous system consequences are agitation, confusion, and hallucinations. An untreated overdose may be fatal, particularly in children. Premortal signs are respiratory depression, arrhythmia and cardiac arrest.

A case report of 24-hour long arrhythmia was treated with verapamil.

Excessive myoclonus can be complicated by rhabdomyolysis; in one case risk was increased due to concomitant use of risperidone.

== Interactions ==
- Other anticholinergic drugs (e.g. spasmolytics, antihistamines, TCAs) : Side effects of trihexyphenidyl may be increased.
- Quinidine : Increased anticholinergic action (particular on AV conduction).
- Antipsychotics : Long term use of trihexyphenidyl may mask or increase the risk of tardive dyskinesia.
- Pethidine (meperidine) : Central effects and side effects of pethidine may be increased.
- Metoclopramide : Action of metoclopramide is decreased.
- Alcohol : Risk of serious intoxication.

== Pharmacology ==
=== Pharmacodynamics ===
Trihexyphenidyl is an anticholinergic. It is specifically an antimuscarinic and acts as a non-selective antagonist of all five muscarinic acetylcholine receptors. However, its antagonistic activity is much stronger at the muscarinic acetylcholine M_{1} and M_{4} receptors, and it can be described as selective for these receptors.

The exact mechanism of action in parkinsonian syndromes is not precisely understood, but it is known that trihexyphenidyl blocks efferent impulses in parasympathetically innervated structures like smooth muscles (spasmolytic activity), salivary glands, and eyes (mydriasis). In higher doses direct central inhibition of cerebral motor centers may contribute. In very high doses central toxicity as seen in atropine overdose is noted.

It possibly also binds to dopamine receptors.

=== Pharmacokinetics ===
Trihexyphenidyl is rapidly absorbed from the gastrointestinal tract. Trihexyphenidyl exhibits high permeability, with absorption occurring primarily via passive diffusion. It is predicted to belong to Biopharmaceutics Drug Disposition Classification System (BDDCS) class I based on structural parameter modeling. Trihexyphenidyl has also been described in the literature as a Biopharmaceutics Classification System (BCS) class I drug. The onset of action is within 1 hour after oral dosing. The peak activity is noted after 2 to 3 hours. The duration of action of one single dose is 6 to 12 hours in a dose dependent manner. It is excreted in the urine, probably as unchanged drug. More precise data in animals and humans have so far not been determined.

== Chemistry ==
Trihexyphenidyl can be synthesized in two ways, one linear and one convergent synthesis.

In the first way, the initial 2-(1-piperidino)propiophenone is synthesized in turn by the aminomethylation of acetophenone using paraformaldehyde and piperidine in a Mannich reaction. In the second step the 2-(1-piperidino)propiophenone is reacted with cyclohexylmagnesium bromide in a Grignard reaction.

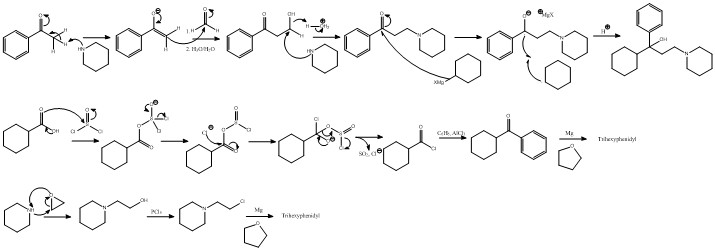
Artane linear and convergent synthesis

=== Stereochemistry ===
Trihexyphenidyl has a chiral center and two enantiomers. Medications are racemates.

Enantiomers
CAS number: 40520-25-0	CAS number: 40520-24-9

== History ==
Trihexyphenidyl has been clinically relevant in trials pertaining to Parkinson's disease since 1949.

In the United States, the Food and Drug Administration (FDA) approved Artane, or its generic form trihexyphenidyl hydrochloride, in June 2003, for the clinical use of all types of parkinsonism.

== Society and culture ==
=== Recreational use ===
The neurologist Oliver Sacks reported using the drug recreationally in the 1960s. He recalled taking "a large dose" knowing full well the drug was intended for people with Parkinson's. More recounts of Dr. Sacks' experiences — including experimentation with mescaline, psilocybin, LSD, and probably DMT — have been compared in his book Hallucinations.

During the 1970s, trihexyphenidyl (trade name Parkan) was the most popular recreationally used prescription drug in Hungary.

In a 2008 news report, trihexyphenidyl was seen to be used for recreational purposes among Iraqi soldiers and police, among other prescription drugs. The report states that the drugs were taken to relieve combat stress reaction. Although that may be the case for some, others used Artane as a substitute or more intense version of LSD. This was especially prevalent in the 1960s, according to a report in "The New Yorker". Similarly to those in Iraqi forces, some of the appeal was that the individual may retain partial control while under the influence. It is still diverted from its primary use, in combination with other drugs, on the Réunion island (France).
