= Parasympatholytic =

Inhibits actions of parasympathetic nervous system

A parasympatholytic agent is a substance or activity that reduces the activity of the parasympathetic nervous system.

The term parasympatholytic typically refers to the effect of a drug, although some poisons act to block the parasympathetic nervous system as well. Most drugs with parasympatholytic properties are anticholinergics.

Parasympatholytic agents and sympathomimetic agents have similar effects to each other, although some differences between the two groups can be observed. For example, both cause mydriasis, but parasympatholytics reduce accommodation (cycloplegia), whereas sympathomimetics do not.

== Clinical significance ==
Parasympatholytic drugs are sometimes used to treat slow heart rhythms (bradycardias or bradydysrhythmias) caused by myocardial infarctions or other pathologies, as well as to treat conditions that cause bronchioles in the lung to constrict, such as asthma. By blocking the parasympathetic nervous system, parasympatholytic drugs can increase heart rate in patients with bradycardic heart rhythms, and open up airways and reduce mucus production in patients with asthma.
