= Pirenzepine =

Chemical compound

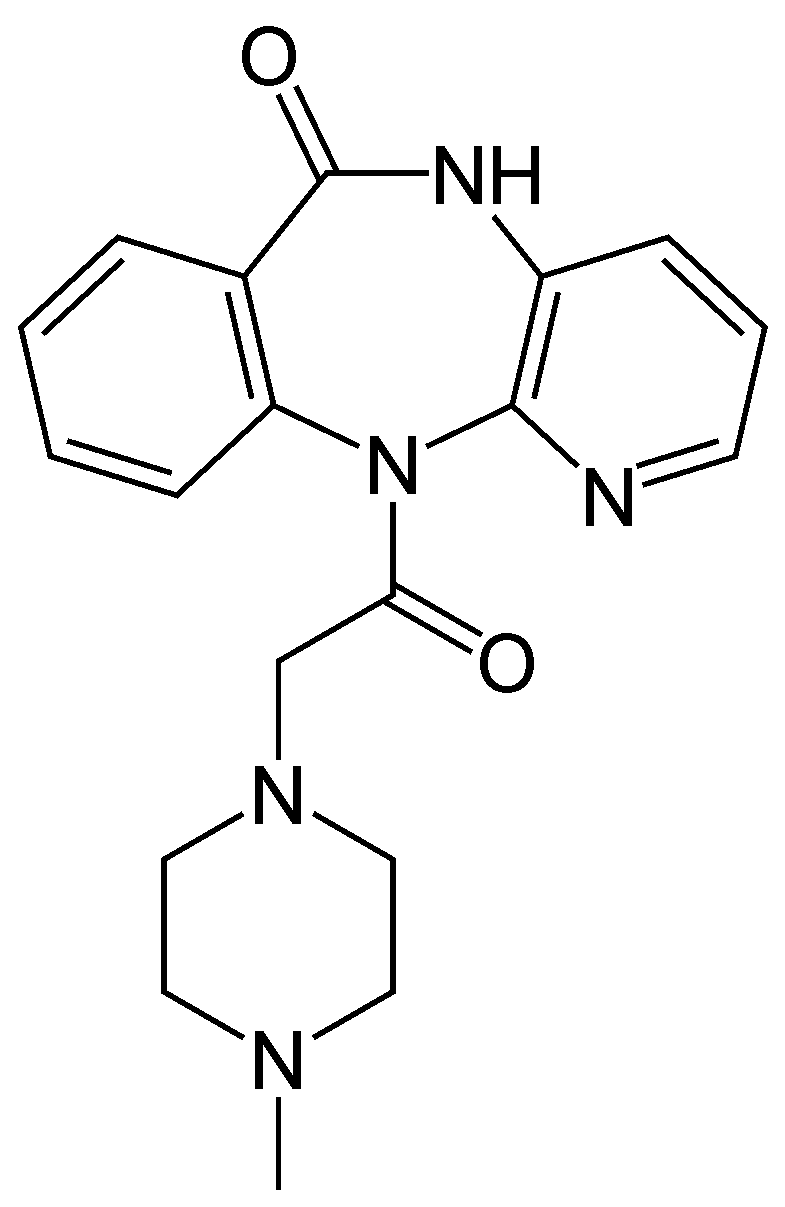

Clinical data
- Trade names: Gastrozepin
- AHFS/Drugs.com: International Drug Names
- ATC code: A02BX03 (WHO)

Identifiers
- IUPAC name: 11-[(4-methylpiperazin-1-yl)acetyl]-5,11-dihydro-6H-pyrido[2,3-b][1,4]benzodiazepin-6-one
- CAS Number: 28797-61-7
- PubChem CID: 4848
- IUPHAR/BPS: 328
- DrugBank: DB00670
- ChemSpider: 4682
- UNII: 3G0285N20N
- KEGG: D08389
- ChEBI: CHEBI:8247
- ChEMBL: ChEMBL9967
- CompTox Dashboard (EPA): DTXSID7023487
- ECHA InfoCard: 100.044.739

Chemical and physical data
- Formula: C_{19}H_{21}N_{5}O_{2}
- Molar mass: 351.410 g·mol^{−1}
- 3D model (JSmol): Interactive image
- SMILES: O=C3c1ccccc1N(C(=O)CN2CCN(C)CC2)c4ncccc4N3
- InChI: InChI=1S/C19H21N5O2/c1-22-9-11-23(12-10-22)13-17(25)24-16-7-3-2-5-14(16)19(26)21-15-6-4-8-20-18(15)24/h2-8H,9-13H2,1H3,(H,21,26); Key:RMHMFHUVIITRHF-UHFFFAOYSA-N

Pirenzepine (Gastrozepin), an M_{1} selective antagonist, is used in the treatment of peptic ulcers, as it reduces gastric acid secretion and reduces muscle spasm. It is in a class of drugs known as muscarinic receptor antagonists; acetylcholine is the neurotransmitter of the parasympathetic nervous system which initiates the rest-and-digest state (as opposed to fight-or-flight), resulting in an increase in gastric motility and digestion; whereas pirenzepine would inhibit these actions and cause decreased gastric motility leading to delayed gastric emptying and constipation. It has no effects on the brain and spinal cord as it cannot diffuse through the blood–brain barrier.

Pirenzepine has been investigated for use in myopia control.

It promotes the homodimerization or oligomerisation of M_{1} receptors.

== See also ==
- AFDX-384
- Telenzepine
