= Hexamethonium =

Chemical compound

Clinical data
- Pregnancy category: D

Legal status
- Legal status: In general: ℞ (Prescription only)

Identifiers
- IUPAC name: N,N,N,N',N',N-hexamethylhexane-1,6-diaminium
- CAS Number: 60-26-4
- PubChem CID: 3604
- IUPHAR/BPS: 3963
- DrugBank: DB08960
- ChemSpider: 3478
- UNII: 3C9PSP36Z2
- ChEMBL: ChEMBL105608
- CompTox Dashboard (EPA): DTXSID9045053

Chemical and physical data
- Formula: C_{12}H_{30}N_{2}
- Molar mass: 202.386 g·mol^{−1}
- 3D model (JSmol): Interactive image
- SMILES: C(CCCC[N+](C)(C)C)C[N+](C)(C)C
- InChI: InChI=1S/C12H30N2/c1-13(2,3)11-9-7-8-10-12-14(4,5)6/h7-12H2,1-6H3/q+2; Key:VZJFGSRCJCXDSG-UHFFFAOYSA-N

Hexamethonium is a non-depolarising ganglionic blocker, a neuronal nicotinic (nAChR) receptor antagonist that acts in autonomic ganglia by binding mostly in or on the nAChR receptor, and not the acetylcholine binding site itself. It does not have any effect on the muscarinic acetylcholine receptors (mAChR) located on target organs of the parasympathetic nervous system, nor on the nicotinic receptors at the skeletal neuromuscular junction, but acts as antagonist at the nicotinic acetylcholine receptors located in sympathetic and parasympathetic ganglia (nAChR).

== Pharmacology ==
By blocking the neuronal nicotinic receptors in autonomic ganglia, which are necessary for transmission in all autonomic ganglia, both the sympathetic and parasympathetic nervous systems are inhibited. Its action on the neuronal nicotinic receptors is primarily through the block of the ion pore, rather than through competition with the binding site for acetylcholine.

Postganglionic sympathetic systems are usually regulated by norepinephrine (noradrenaline) (adrenergic receptors), whereas parasympathetic systems are acetylcholine-based, and instead rely on muscarinic receptors (some post-ganglionic sympathetic neurons, such as those stimulating sweat glands, release acetylcholine).

The organ system and adverse effects of ganglion blockers are due to the parasympathetic and sympathetic stimuli blockage at preganglionic sites. Side-effects include combined sympatholytic (e.g., orthostatic hypotension and sexual dysfunction) and parasympatholytic (e.g., constipation, urinary retention, glaucoma, blurry vision, decreased lacrimal gland secretion, dry mouth (xerostomia) effects.

== Uses ==
It was formerly used to treat disorders, such as chronic hypertension, of the peripheral nervous system, which is innervated only by the sympathetic nervous system. The non-specificity of this treatment led to discontinuing its use.

The use of inhaled hexamethonium, an unapproved drug, in a normal volunteer during a medical study is believed to have caused or contributed to her death in light of the presence of abnormal "ground glass opacities" on her chest X-ray.

== See also ==
- Decamethonium
- Horace Smirk
