= Muscarinic acetylcholine receptor M2 =

Receptor protein found in humans

CHRM2
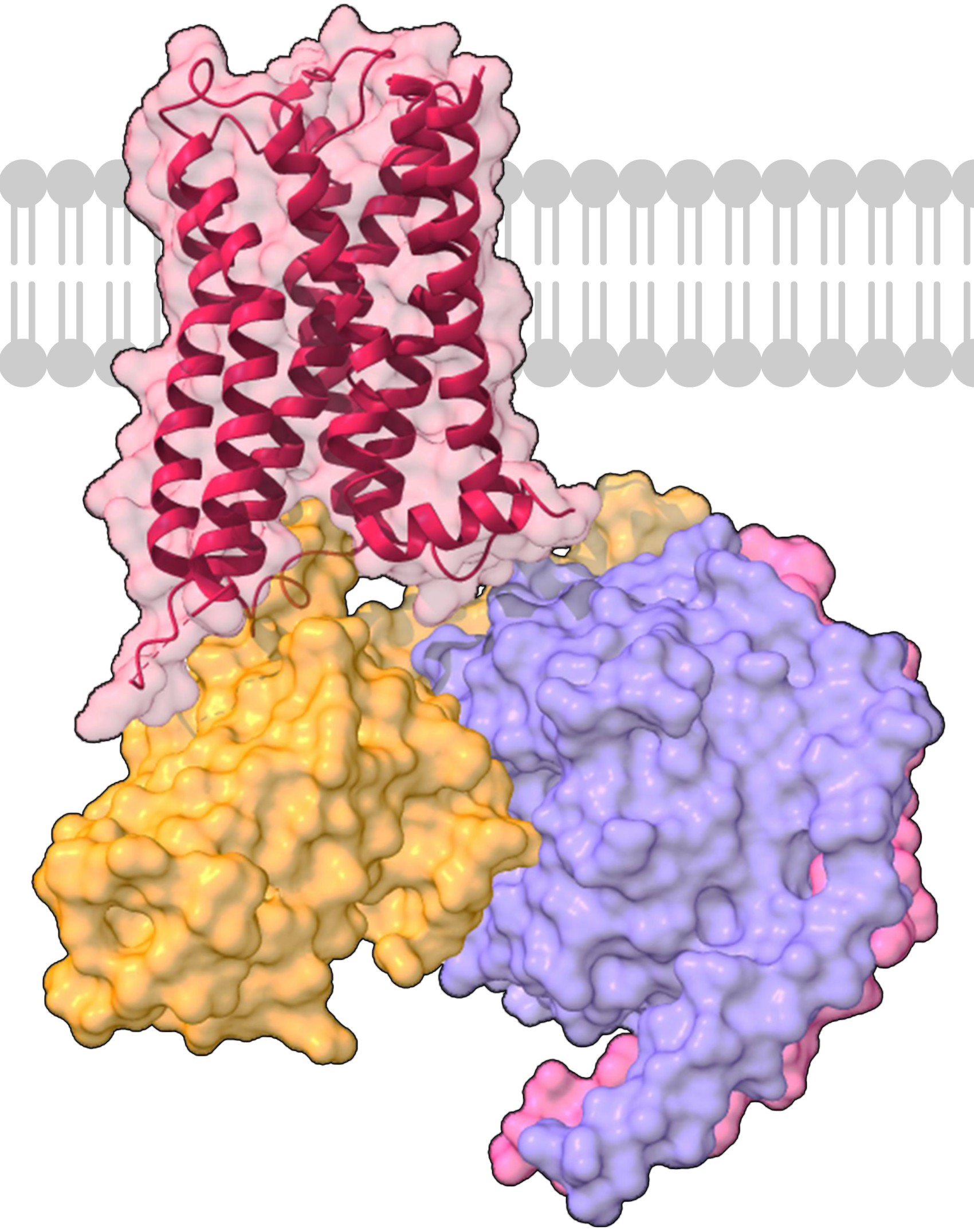

Identifiers
- Aliases: CHRM2, HM2, cholinergic receptor muscarinic 2
- External IDs: OMIM: 118493; MGI: 88397; GeneCards: CHRM2
Available structures
PDB	Ortholog search: PDBe RCSB
PDB	List of PDB id codes 3UON, 4MQS, 4MQT

Gene location (Human)
Chr.	Chromosome 7 (human)
Band	7q33	Start	136,868,652 bp
Band	7q33	End	137,020,255 bp

Gene location (Mouse)
Chr.	Chromosome 6 (mouse)
Band	6|6 B1	Start	36,365,019 bp
Band	6|6 B1	End	36,505,349 bp
RNA expression pattern
Bgee	Human / Mouse (ortholog); Top expressed in: stromal cell of endometrium; right auricle of heart; apex of heart; muscle layer of sigmoid colon; left ventricle; gallbladder; testicle; epithelium of colon; right lung; smooth muscle tissue / Top expressed in: interventricular septum; left ventricle; upper lip; olfactory bulb; brain stem; stomach; lower lip; duodenum; pons; medulla oblongata; More reference expression data
BioGPS	n/a
Gene ontology
Molecular function	G protein-coupled receptor activity; signal transducer activity; G protein-coupled acetylcholine receptor activity; arrestin family protein binding; G protein-coupled serotonin receptor activity; neurotransmitter receptor activity
Cellular component	axon terminus; postsynaptic membrane; membrane; plasma membrane; synapse; integral component of plasma membrane; cell junction; soma; dendrite; symmetric synapse; asymmetric synapse; clathrin-coated vesicle membrane; integral component of membrane; glutamatergic synapse; cholinergic synapse; integral component of postsynaptic membrane; integral component of presynaptic membrane
Biological process	G protein-coupled acetylcholine receptor signaling pathway; G protein-coupled receptor signaling pathway; regulation of smooth muscle contraction; adenylate cyclase-modulating G protein-coupled receptor signaling pathway; G protein-coupled receptor signaling pathway, coupled to cyclic nucleotide second messenger; response to virus; synaptic transmission, cholinergic; nervous system development; adenylate cyclase-inhibiting G protein-coupled acetylcholine receptor signaling pathway; phospholipase C-activating G protein-coupled acetylcholine receptor signaling pathway; signal transduction; membrane organization; regulation of heart contraction; regulation of synaptic vesicle exocytosis; chemical synaptic transmission; G protein-coupled serotonin receptor signaling pathway
Sources:Amigo / QuickGO
Orthologs
Databases	NCBI: entry; OMA: entry
Species	Human	Mouse
Entrez	1129	243764
Ensembl	ENSG00000181072	ENSMUSG00000045613
UniProt	P08172	Q9ERZ4
RefSeq (mRNA)	NM_000739; NM_001006626; NM_001006627; NM_001006628; NM_001006629 NM_001006630; NM_001006631; NM_001006632; NM_001006633; NM_001378972; NM_001378973	NM_203491
RefSeq (protein)	NP_000730; NP_001006627; NP_001006628; NP_001006629; NP_001006630 NP_001006631; NP_001006632; NP_001006633; NP_001365901; NP_001365902	NP_987076
Location (UCSC)	Chr 7: 136.87 – 137.02 Mb	Chr 6: 36.37 – 36.51 Mb
PubMed search
- Wikidata
View/Edit Human	View/Edit Mouse

The muscarinic acetylcholine receptor M_{2}, also known as the cholinergic receptor, muscarinic 2, is a muscarinic acetylcholine receptor that in humans is encoded by the CHRM2 gene. Multiple alternatively spliced transcript variants have been described for this gene. It is G_{i}-coupled, reducing intracellular levels of cAMP.

== Function ==
=== Heart ===
The M_{2} muscarinic receptors are located in the heart, where they act to slow the heart rate down to normal sinus rhythm after negative stimulatory actions of the parasympathetic nervous system, by slowing the speed of depolarization. They also reduce contractile forces of the atrial cardiac muscle, and reduce conduction velocity of the atrioventricular node (AV node). However, they have little effect on the contractile forces of the ventricular muscle, slightly decreasing force.

=== Airway smooth muscle ===
Both M_{2} and M_{3} muscarinic receptors are expressed in the smooth muscles of the airway, with the majority of the receptors being the M_{2} type. Activation of the M_{2} receptors, which are coupled to G_{i}, inhibits the β-adrenergic mediated relaxation of the airway smooth muscle. Synergistically, activation of the M_{3} receptors, which couple to G_{q}, stimulates contraction of the airway smooth muscle.

=== IQ ===
A Dutch family study found that there is "a highly significant association" between the CHRM2 gene and intelligence as measured by the Wechsler Adult Intelligence Scale-Revised. A similar association was found independently in the Minnesota Twin and Family Study.

However, a larger 2009 study attempting to replicate this claim instead found no significant association between the CHRM2 gene and intelligence.

=== Olfactory behavior ===
Mediating olfactory guided behaviors (e.g. odor discrimination, aggression, mating).

== Mechanism of action ==
M_{2} muscarinic receptors act via a G_{i} type receptor, which causes a decrease in cAMP in the cell, generally leading to inhibitory-type effects. They appear to generally serve as autoreceptors.

In addition, they modulate G protein-coupled inwardly-rectifying potassium channels. In the heart, this contributes to a decreased heart rate. They do so by the G_{βγ} subunit of the G protein; G_{βγ} shifts the open probability of K^{+} channels in the membrane of the cardiac pacemaker cells, which causes an outward current of potassium, effectively hyperpolarizing the membrane, which slows down the heart rate.

== Ligands ==
Few highly selective M_{2} agonists are available at present, although there are several non-selective muscarinic agonists that stimulate M_{2}, and a number of selective M_{2} antagonists are available.

=== Agonists ===
- (2S,2'R,3'S,5'R)-1-methyl-2-(2-methyl-1,3-oxathiolan-5-yl)pyrrolidine 3-sulfoxide methyl iodide (selective for M_{2} but only partial agonist)
- Berberine
- Iper-8-Naph (alias N-8-Iper, bitopic/dualsteric agonist)
- Methacholine
- PAI (photoswitchable agonist)

=== Positive allosteric modulators ===
- BAY 2413555

=== Antagonists ===
- AFDX-384
- Atropine
- Chlorpromazine
- Dicycloverine
- Dimenhydrinate
- Dimethindene
- Diphenhydramine
- Gallamine
- Hyoscyamine
- Ipratropium
- Methoctramine
- Otenzepad
- Oxybutynin
- Tolterodine
- Trimipramine

== See also ==
- Muscarinic acetylcholine receptor
