= Mirabegron =

Medication for overactive bladder

Clinical data
- Trade names: Myrbetriq, Betanis, Betmiga, others
- Other names: YM-178
- AHFS/Drugs.com: Monograph
- MedlinePlus: a612038
- License data: US DailyMed: Mirabegron
- Pregnancy category: AU: B3
- Routes of administration: By mouth
- ATC code: G04BD12 (WHO)

Legal status
- Legal status: AU: S4 (Prescription only); UK: POM (Prescription only); US: ℞-only; EU: Rx-only; In general: ℞ (Prescription only)

Pharmacokinetic data
- Bioavailability: 29–35%
- Protein binding: 71%
- Metabolism: Liver via (direct) glucuronidation, amide hydrolysis, and minimal oxidative metabolism in vivo by CYP2D6 and CYP3A4. Some involvement of butylcholinesterase
- Elimination half-life: 50 hours
- Excretion: Urine (55%), faeces (34%)

Identifiers
- IUPAC name: 2-(2-Amino-1,3-thiazol-4-yl)-N-[4-(2-{[(2R)-2-hydroxy-2-phenylethyl]amino}ethyl)phenyl]acetamide
- CAS Number: 223673-61-8
- PubChem CID: 9865528
- DrugBank: DB08893
- ChemSpider: 8041219
- UNII: MVR3JL3B2V
- KEGG: D09535
- ChEBI: CHEBI:65349
- ChEMBL: ChEMBL2095212
- CompTox Dashboard (EPA): DTXSID101021648
- ECHA InfoCard: 100.226.392

Chemical and physical data
- Formula: C_{21}H_{24}N_{4}O_{2}S
- Molar mass: 396.51 g·mol^{−1}
- 3D model (JSmol): Interactive image
- SMILES: O=C(Nc1ccc(cc1)CCNC[C@H](O)c2ccccc2)Cc3nc(sc3)N
- InChI: InChI=1S/C21H24N4O2S/c22-21-25-18(14-28-21)12-20(27)24-17-8-6-15(7-9-17)10-11-23-13-19(26)16-4-2-1-3-5-16/h1-9,14,19,23,26H,10-13H2,(H2,22,25)(H,24,27)/t19-/m0/s1; Key:PBAPPPCECJKMCM-IBGZPJMESA-N

Mirabegron, sold under the brand name Myrbetriq among others, is a medication used to treat overactive bladder. Its benefits are similar to antimuscarinic medication such as solifenacin or tolterodine. It is taken by mouth.

Common side effects include high blood pressure, headaches, and urinary tract infections. Other significant side effects include urinary retention, irregular heart rate, and angioedema. It works by activating the β_{3} adrenergic receptor in the bladder, resulting in its relaxation.

Mirabegron is the first clinically available beta-3 agonist with approval for use in adults with overactive bladder. Mirabegron was approved for medical use in the United States and in the European Union in 2012. In 2023, it was the 214th most commonly prescribed medication in the United States, with more than 2 million prescriptions. It is available as a generic medication.

== Medical uses ==
Mirabegron is used is in the treatment of overactive bladder. It works equally well to antimuscarinic medication such as solifenacin or tolterodine. In the United Kingdom it is less preferred to these agents.

Mirabegron is also indicated to treat neurogenic detrusor overactivity (NDO), a bladder dysfunction related to neurological impairment, in children ages three years and older.

== Adverse effects ==
Adverse effects by incidence:

Very common (>10% incidence) adverse effects include:

- Elevated blood pressure

Common (1–10% incidence) adverse effects include:

- Dry mouth
- Nasopharyngitis
- Urinary tract infection (UTI)
- Headache
- Influenza
- Constipation
- Dizziness
- Joint pain
- Cystitis
- Back pain
- Upper respiratory tract infection (URTI)
- Sinusitis
- Diarrhea
- High heart rate
- Fatigue
- Abdominal pain
- Neoplasms (cancers)

Rare (<1% incidence) adverse effects include:

- Palpitations
- Blurred vision
- Glaucoma
- Indigestion
- Gastritis
- Abdominal distension
- Rhinitis
- Elevations in liver enzymes (GGTP, AST, ALT and LDH)
- Renal and urinary disorders (e.g., nephrolithiasis, bladder pain)
- Reproductive system disorders (e.g., vulvovaginal pruritus, vaginal infection)
- Skin and subcutaneous tissue disorders (e.g., urticaria, leukocytoclastic vasculitis, rash, pruritus, purpura, lip edema)
- Stevens–Johnson syndrome associated with increased serum ALT, AST and bilirubin
- Urinary retention

== Research ==
As a selective beta-3 adrenergic agonist, mirabegron does not cause as many cardiovascular adverse effects of other adrenergic agonists that are active at the beta-1 and beta-2 adrenergic receptors as it has low but non-negligible activity at beta-1 and beta-2 adrenergic receptors. Beta-3 adrenergic agonists activate brown adipose tissue (BAT) and increase energy expenditure, leading to research interest in their development as weight loss drugs. A combination of mirabegron and metformin was studied in mice and caused greater weight loss than either drug alone. A human study in obese individuals found an increase in insulin sensitivity but no significant weight change, which was hypothesized to be due to low levels of BAT in obese humans and/or the low dose of mirabegron used in the study.
