= List of adverse effects of aripiprazole =

The rates of adverse effects of aripiprazole are:

== Adults ==
=== Very common (>10% incidence) ===
- Weight gain
- Headache
- Agitation
- Insomnia
- Anxiety
- Nausea & vomiting
- Akathisia — a sense of unease and restlessness that presents itself with anxiety
- Lightheadedness
- Constipation
- Emotional instability
- Euphoria or Dysphoria

=== Common (1–10% incidence) ===
- Dizziness
- Dyspepsia — indigestion
- Somnolence — which is usually mild and transient and less severe than that seen with most antipsychotics.
- Fatigue
- Restlessness
- Dry mouth
- Extrapyramidal side effects (e.g. dystonia, parkinsonism, tremor, myoclonic jerks, etc.)
- Orthostatic hypotension
- Musculoskeletal stiffness
- Abdominal discomfort
- Blurred vision
- Cough
- Pain
- Myalgia
- Rash
- Rhinitis

=== Uncommon (0.1–1% incidence) ===
- Leukopenia
- Thrombocytopenia
- Bradycardia (low heart rate)
- Palpitations
- Orthostatic hypotension
- Dry eye
- Photophobia
- Diplopia
- Eyelid oedema
- Photopsia
- Diarrhoea
- Gastritis
- Pathological gambling
- Dysphagia
- Gastroesophageal reflux disease
- Swollen tongue
- Oesophagitis
- Hypoaesthesia oral
- Face oedema
- Gait disturbance
- Chills
- Discomfort
- Feeling abnormal
- Mobility decreased
- Self-mutilation
- Heart rate increased
- Blood glucose increased
- Pyrexia
- Blood prolactin increased
- Blood urea increased
- Electrocardiogram QT prolonged
- Blood bilirubin increased
- Hepatic enzyme increased
- Increased appetite
- Nocturia
- Polyuria
- Pollakiuria
- Incontinence
- Urinary retention
- Sexual dysfunction
- Amenorrhoea
- Pruritus
- Photosensitivity reaction
- Urticaria

=== Rare (<0.1%) ===
- Neuroleptic malignant syndrome (Combination of fever, muscle stiffness, faster breathing, sweating, reduced consciousness, and sudden change in blood pressure and heart rate)
- Neutropenia
- Suicidal ideation and behavior
- Depression
- Painful and/or sustained erection (Priapism)
- Seizures
- Rhabdomyolysis
- Agranulocytosis
- Cardiopulmonary failure
- Myocardial infarction (heart attack)
- Atrial flutter
- Supraventricular tachycardia
- Ventricular tachycardia
- Atrioventricular block
- Extrasystoles
- Sinus tachycardia
- Atrial fibrillation
- Angina pectoris
- Myocardial ischaemia
- Pancreatitis
- Diabetic ketoacidosis
- Prolonged QT interval (less common than with most other atypical antipsychotic drugs)
- Speech disorder
- Electrolyte abnormalities including hyponatraemia, hypokalaemia, hypocalcaemia, etc.
- Hypertension
- Dysphagia
- Oropharyngeal spasm
- Laryngospasm
- Hepatitis
- Jaundice
- Hypersalivation
- Chest pain
- Urinary retention or incontinence
- Alopecia (hair loss)
- Photosensitivity reaction
- Rash
- Xerostomia (when given by injection)
- Tardive dyskinesia (As with all antipsychotic medication, patients using aripiprazole may develop the permanent neurological disorder tardive dyskinesia.)
- Stroke
- Transient Ischaemic Attack
- Increased body temperature
- Angioedema
- Cardiorespiratory arrest
- Cardiorespiratory failure

Sudden unexplained death has been reported. However, the frequency is unknown.

== Common in children ==
- Feeling sleepy
- Headache
- Vomiting
- Fatigue
- Increased appetite
- Insomnia
- Nausea
- Stuffy nose
- Weight gain
- Uncontrolled movement such as restlessness, tremor muscle stiffness
