= Bladder diary =

Record of a person's urinary habits

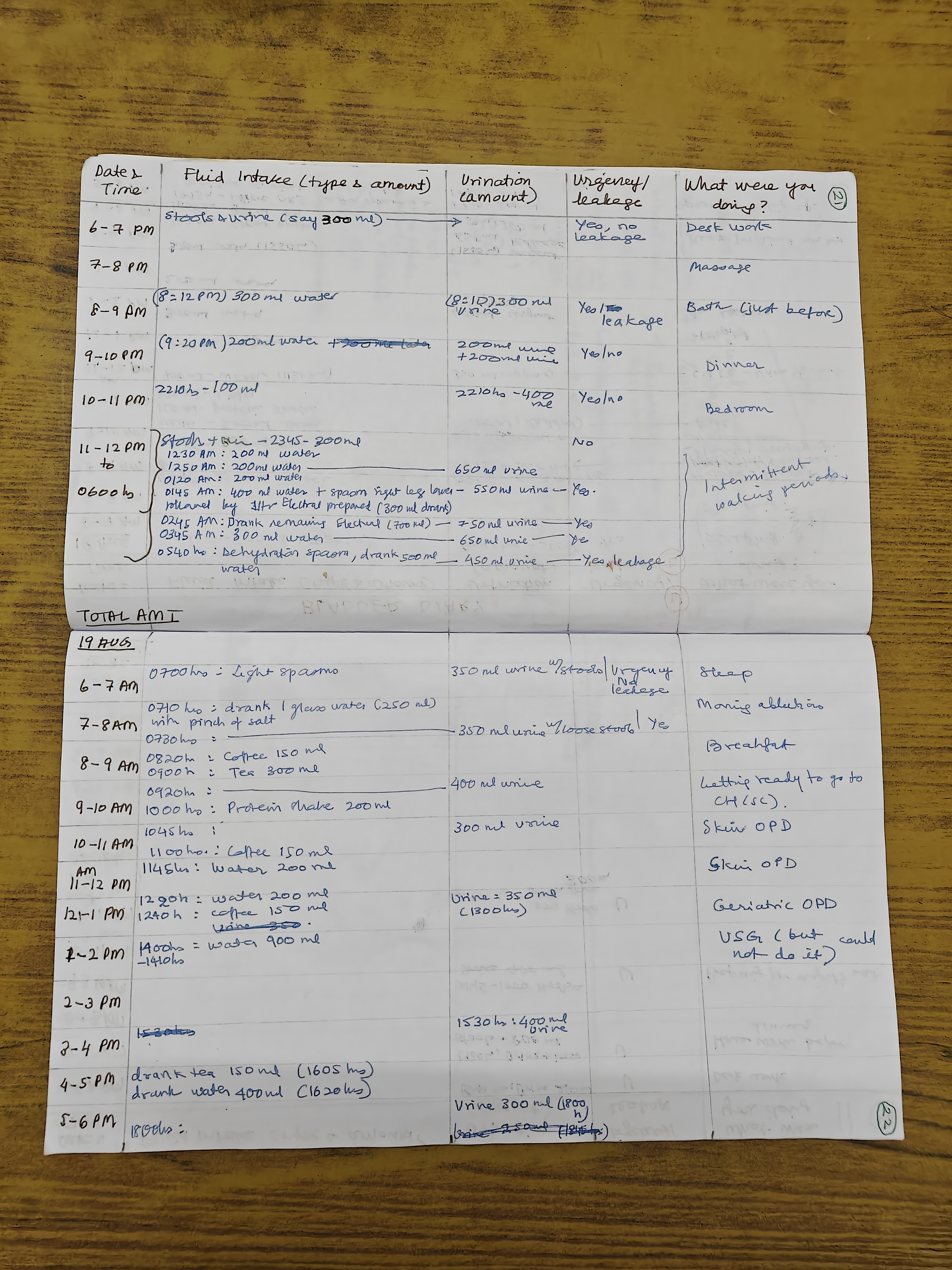
A handwritten bladder diary

A bladder diary, also referred to as a voiding diary, frequency volume chart (FVC), or micturition diary, is a semi-objective log used to record a person’s urinary habits and fluid intake over a defined period, typically 2 to 3 days. Patients document details such as the timing and volume of urination, fluid consumption, episodes of urgency, and any urinary leakage or incontinence. The purpose of a bladder diary is to help a healthcare professional to better understand a patient's bladder function and symptoms.

The bladder diary provides valuable urodiagnostic information that helps healthcare providers evaluate lower urinary tract symptoms (LUTS), including urinary frequency, urgency, nocturia (nighttime urination), and incontinence. It is often recommended during initial assessments to differentiate between conditions like overactive bladder, polyuria, and urinary retention. Using a bladder diary can guide personalised treatment plans involving lifestyle advice, behavioural therapies (e.g., bladder training, pelvic floor exercises), and medications.

Bladder diaries are a rich source of relatively objective information on the voiding and fluid consumption habits of patients with LUTS. They are useful in identifying potential causes of LUTS, for guiding behaviour modifications, and for assessing treatment outcomes. However, the usefulness of bladder diaries depends largely on complete and accurate data entry. Diaries require significant patient effort to complete, which can result in missing or incomplete data.

Incomplete or invalid bladder diary entries were frequently observed, indicating the challenges patients face when using this data collection approach. Using a questionnaire-based patient-reported outcome measure (PROM) serves as a practical substitute for diaries to record voiding frequency and could provide a simpler means of documenting certain symptoms.

== Historical background ==
The concept of systematically recording urinary habits to understand bladder function has evolved significantly over the past century. Early studies on urinary flow and bladder function date back to the early 20th century. In 1932, Ballenger suggested measuring the maximum distance of urine ejection, an early attempt at quantifying voiding behavior.

Various technological advancements followed, including methods to record urine weight over time and calculate flow rate, such as the work of Drake in 1948, and subsequent improvements by Kaufman and Von Garrelts in the 1950s. Drake invented the first uroflometer; he described a device where urine passed into a container suspended by a spring, with the increasing weight of urine recorded over time on a kymographic record, enabling measurement of urinary flow. Kaufman devised an electrical apparatus that was an improvement to Drake's system, while Von Garrelts' work was on electrical flow rate calculation.

In order to better understand patients experiencing lower urinary tract symptoms (LUTS), clinicians began encouraging them to keep written logs of their urination habits. Building on this practice, the International Continence Society (ICS) proposed a standardized system in 2012, introducing three distinct diary formats:

1. the micturition time chart, which documents only the timing of voids over a minimum 24-hour period;
2. the frequency–volume chart, which records both the timing of voids and the volume passed at each instance, also for at least 24 hours; and
3. the voiding diary (or bladder diary), which provides a more detailed record including voiding times, volumes, episodes of incontinence, pad usage, fluid intake, and the intensity of urgency or leakage.

Among these, the bladder diary has become an especially valuable tool, offering a consistent and structured way to manually track both fluid consumption and urinary output.

Inevitably, efforts to computerise bladder diaries followed; an early system was Compu-Void, a manual unit operated on a DOS-based personal computer with limited memory capacity, marking a significant leap towards automation in urinary monitoring.
