= Velufenacin =

Chemical compound

Clinical data
- Other names: DA-8010

Legal status
- Legal status: Investigational

Identifiers
- IUPAC name: [(3R)-1-Methylpyrrolidin-3-yl]methyl N-[2-(3-chloro-4-fluorophenyl)phenyl]carbamate
- CAS Number: 1648737-78-3
- PubChem CID: 121425461
- ChemSpider: 88298721
- UNII: WV3E0S3IQB

Chemical and physical data
- Formula: C_{19}H_{20}ClFN_{2}O_{2}
- Molar mass: 362.83 g·mol^{−1}
- 3D model (JSmol): Interactive image
- SMILES: CN1CC[C@H](C1)COC(=O)NC2=CC=CC=C2C3=CC(=C(C=C3)F)Cl
- InChI: InChI=1S/C19H20ClFN2O2/c1-23-9-8-13(11-23)12-25-19(24)22-18-5-3-2-4-15(18)14-6-7-17(21)16(20)10-14/h2-7,10,13H,8-9,11-12H2,1H3,(H,22,24)/t13-/m1/s1; Key:SYBGVVSJNMTWCI-CYBMUJFWSA-N

Velufenacin (DA-8010) is a muscarinic antagonist that operates on the M3 receptor and is tissue-selective for bladder over salivary glands. It is in development as a treatment for overactive bladder.
