= C22H31NO2 =

The molecular formula C_{22}H_{31}NO_{2} (molar mass: 341.495 g/mol, exact mass: 341.2355 u) may refer to:

- Desfesoterodine
- Pregnenolone 16α-carbonitrile
