= C20H27N =

Chemical formula for Alverine or Terodiline

The molecular formula C_{20}H_{27}N (molar mass: 281.44 g/mol) may refer to:

- Alverine, a drug used for functional gastrointestinal disorders
- Terodiline
