= Naltalimide =

Chemical compound

Clinical data
- ATC code: None

Identifiers
- IUPAC name: 2-[(5α,6β)-17-(Cyclopropylmethyl)-3,14-dihydroxy-4,5-epoxymorphinan-6-yl]-1H-isoindole-1,3(2H)-dione
- CAS Number: 160359-68-2
- PubChem CID: 16066809
- ChemSpider: 17226389
- UNII: PUO0LMS4NX
- CompTox Dashboard (EPA): DTXSID10166868

Chemical and physical data
- Formula: C_{28}H_{28}N_{2}O_{5}
- Molar mass: 472.541 g·mol^{−1}
- 3D model (JSmol): Interactive image
- SMILES: c1ccc2c(c1)C(=O)N(C2=O)[C@@H]3CC[C@]4([C@H]5Cc6ccc(c7c6[C@]4([C@H]3O7)CCN5CC8CC8)O)O
- InChI: InChI=1S/C28H28N2O5/c31-20-8-7-16-13-21-28(34)10-9-19(30-25(32)17-3-1-2-4-18(17)26(30)33)24-27(28,22(16)23(20)35-24)11-12-29(21)14-15-5-6-15/h1-4,7-8,15,19,21,24,31,34H,5-6,9-14H2/t19-,21-,24+,27+,28-/m1/s1; Key:DHAITNWJDOSRBU-IBHWKQIPSA-N

Naltalimide (INN; development code TRK-130, formerly TAK 363) is a novel, centrally-acting opioid drug which is under development by Takeda and Toray for the treatment of overactive bladder/urinary incontinence. It acts as a potent and selective partial agonist of the μ-opioid receptor (K_{i} = 0.268 nM, EC_{50} = 2.39 nM, E_{max} = 66.1%) over the δ-opioid (K_{i} = 121 nM, EC_{50} = 26.1 nM, E_{max} = 71.0%) and κ-opioid receptors (K_{i} = 8.97 nM, EC_{50} = 9.51 nM, E_{max} = 62.6%). Notably, naltalimide somehow appears to lack certain undesirable side effects such as constipation seen with other μ-opioid receptor agonists such as morphine. It enhances bladder storage via suppression of the afferent limb of the micturition reflex pathway.
