= Aromatic-hydroxylamine O-acetyltransferase =

Class of enzymes

Identifiers
- EC no.: 2.3.1.56
- CAS no.: 52660-15-8

Databases
- IntEnz: IntEnz view
- BRENDA: BRENDA entry
- ExPASy: NiceZyme view
- KEGG: KEGG entry
- MetaCyc: metabolic pathway
- PRIAM: profile
- PDB structures: RCSB PDB PDBe PDBsum
- Gene Ontology: AmiGO / QuickGO
Search
- PMC: articles
- PubMed: articles
- NCBI: proteins

Aromatic-hydroxylamine O-acetyltransferase (EC 2.3.1.56) is an enzyme that catalyzes the rearrangement of an acetyl group from a nitrogen atom in a hydroxylamine derivative (an acetohydroxamic acid) to the oxygen atom of the parent hydroxylamine. The enzyme was characterised from rat liver.

N-hydroxy-4-acetylaminobiphenyl
+
N-hydroxy-4-aminobiphenyl
N-hydroxy-4-aminobiphenyl
+
N-acetoxy-1,1'-biphenyl-4-amine

The two substrates of this enzyme are N-hydroxy-4-acetylaminobiphenyl and N-hydroxy-4-aminobiphenyl. The former molecule is converted to the N-hydroxy-4-aminobiphenyl while the latter becomes N-acetoxy-1,1'-biphenyl-4-amine after receiving the transferred acetyl group.

This enzyme belongs to the family of transferases, specifically those acyltransferases transferring groups other than aminoacyl groups. The systematic name of this enzyme class is N-hydroxy-4-acetylaminobiphenyl:N-hydroxy-4-aminobiphenyl O-acetyltransferase. Other names in common use include aromatic hydroxylamine acetyltransferase, arylhydroxamate acyltransferase, arylhydroxamate N,O-acetyltransferase, arylhydroxamic acid N,O-acetyltransferase, arylhydroxamic acyltransferase, N,O-acetyltransferase, and N-hydroxy-2-acetylaminofluorene N-O acyltransferase.
