= NAFC =

NAFC may refer to

== Organizations ==
=== North America ===
- North American Football Confederation
- Northwest Atlantic Fisheries Centre, of Canada
- National Association of Free Clinics, of the U.S.
- National Association For Continence, of the U.S.
- National Association of Friendship Centres - part of the Friendship Centre Movement of Canada
- National Anthropological Film Center, the previous name of the Human Studies Film Archives, part of the Smithsonian Institution in the U.S.
- Nash Finch Company (NASDAQ symbol: NAFC), a U.S. food distribution company

=== Australia ===
- National Aerial Firefighting Centre
- North Adelaide Football Club, Australian rules football team in the South Australian National Football League

=== Elsewhere ===
- NAFC Marine Centre, a constituent institution of the University of the Highlands and Islands in Scotland
