= Finasteride/tadalafil =

Combination drug

Combination of
- Finasteride: 5α-reductase inhibitor
- Tadalafil: Phosphodiesterase 5 (PDE5) inhibitor

Clinical data
- Trade names: Entadfi
- AHFS/Drugs.com: Micromedex Detailed Consumer Information
- License data: US DailyMed: Finasteride and tadalafil
- Routes of administration: By mouth
- ATC code: G04CB51 (WHO)

Legal status
- Legal status: US: ℞-only

Identifiers
- KEGG: D12486

Finasteride/tadalafil, sold under the brand name Entadfi, is a fixed-dose combination medication used for the treatment of benign prostatic hyperplasia (BPH). It contains finasteride and tadalafil. It is taken by mouth.

It was approved for medical use in the United States in December 2021.

== Medical uses ==
Finasteride/tadalafil is indicated to treat benign prostatic hyperplasia (BPH) in men.
