= Solifenacin =

Chemical compound

Clinical data
- Trade names: Vesicare, Vesicare LS
- Other names: YM905
- AHFS/Drugs.com: Monograph
- MedlinePlus: a605019
- License data: US DailyMed: Solifenacin
- Pregnancy category: AU: B3
- Routes of administration: By mouth
- ATC code: G04BD08 (WHO)

Legal status
- Legal status: AU: S4 (Prescription only); UK: POM (Prescription only); US: ℞-only

Pharmacokinetic data
- Bioavailability: 90%
- Protein binding: 98%
- Metabolism: CYP3A4
- Metabolites: Glucuronide, N-oxide, others
- Elimination half-life: 45 to 68 hours
- Excretion: Kidney (69.2%) and fecal (22.5%)

Identifiers
- IUPAC name: (3R)-1-Azabicyclo[2 2 2]oct-3-yl (1S)-1-phenyl-3,4-dihydroisoquinoline-2(1H)-carboxylate
- CAS Number: 242478-37-1
- PubChem CID: 154059
- IUPHAR/BPS: 7483
- DrugBank: DB01591
- ChemSpider: 135771
- UNII: A8910SQJ1U
- KEGG: DG00481
- ChEMBL: ChEMBL1734
- CompTox Dashboard (EPA): DTXSID3048289

Chemical and physical data
- Formula: C_{23}H_{26}N_{2}O_{2}
- Molar mass: 362.473 g·mol^{−1}
- 3D model (JSmol): Interactive image
- SMILES: C1CN2CCC1[C@H](C2)OC(=O)N3CCC4=CC=CC=C4[C@@H]3C5=CC=CC=C5
- InChI: InChI=1S/C23H26N2O2/c26-23(27-21-16-24-13-10-18(21)11-14-24)25-15-12-17-6-4-5-9-20(17)22(25)19-7-2-1-3-8-19/h1-9,18,21-22H,10-16H2/t21-,22-/m0/s1; Key:FBOUYBDGKBSUES-VXKWHMMOSA-N

Solifenacin, sold as the brand name Vesicare (Note: The name comes from Latin vesica meaning bladder; and care. Thus literally a drug which "takes care of the bladder") among others, is a medication used to treat overactive bladder and neurogenic detrusor overactivity (NDO). It may help with incontinence, urinary frequency, and urinary urgency.

Benefits appear similar to other medications in the class. It is taken by mouth.

Common side effects include dry mouth, constipation, and urinary tract infection. Severe side effects may include dementia, urinary retention, QT prolongation, hallucinations, glaucoma, and anaphylaxis. It is unclear if use is safe during pregnancy. It is of the antimuscarinic class and works by decreasing bladder contractions.

Solifenacin was approved for medical use in the United States in 2004. In 2023, it was the 245th most commonly prescribed medication in the United States, with more than 1 million prescriptions.

== Medical uses ==
It is used to treat overactive bladder. It may help with incontinence, urinary frequency, and urinary urgency.

Benefits appear similar to other antimuscarinics such as oxybutynin, tolterodine, and darifenacin.

It is also used to treat neurogenic detrusor overactivity (NDO), a form of bladder dysfunction related to neurological impairment, in children ages two years and older. NDO is a dysfunction of the bladder that results from disease or injury in the nervous system. NDO may be related to congenital conditions (often-inherited conditions beginning at or before birth), such as spina bifida (myelomeningocele), or other conditions such as spinal cord injury. With NDO, there is overactivity of the bladder wall muscle, which normally relaxes to allow storage of urine. The bladder wall muscle overactivity results in sporadic bladder muscle contraction, which increases pressure in the bladder and decreases the volume of urine the bladder can hold. If NDO is not treated, increased pressure in the bladder can put the upper urinary tract at risk of harm, including possible permanent damage to the kidneys. In addition, spontaneous bladder muscle contractions can lead to unexpected and frequent leakage of urine with symptoms of urinary urgency (immediate urge to urinate), frequency (urinating more often than normal) and incontinence (loss of bladder control).

== Contraindications ==
Solifenacin is contraindicated for people with urinary retention, gastric retention, uncontrolled or poorly controlled closed-angle glaucoma, severe liver disease (Child-Pugh class C), and hemodialysis.

Long QT syndrome is not a contraindication although solifenacin, like tolterodine and darifenacin, binds to hERG channels of the heart and may prolong the QT interval. This mechanism appears to be seldom clinically relevant.

Solifenacin is not to be used in people with gastric retention (reduced emptying of the stomach), uncontrolled narrow angle glaucoma (fluid buildup in the eye which raises eye pressure) or hypersensitivity (allergic reaction) to solifenacin or any of its components. Solifenacin is also not recommended for use in people with severe liver failure, clinically significant bladder outlet obstruction in the absence of clean intermittent catheterization, decreased gastrointestinal motility (slowed intestinal contractions), or at high risk of QT prolongation (an electrical disturbance where the heart muscle takes longer than normal to recharge between beats), including people with a known history of QT prolongation and people taking medications known to prolong the QT interval.

== Side effects ==
The most common side effects of solifenacin are dry mouth, constipation and urinary tract infection. As all anticholinergics, solifenacin may rarely cause hyperthermia due to decreased perspiration. Somnolence (sleepiness or drowsiness) has been reported. Severe allergic reactions, such as angioedema (swelling beneath the skin) and anaphylaxis, have been reported in people treated with solifenacin succinate and may be life-threatening.

== Interactions ==
Solifenacin is metabolized in the liver by the cytochrome P450 enzyme CYP3A4. When administered concomitantly with drugs that inhibit CYP3A4, such as ketoconazole, the metabolism of solifenacin is impaired, leading to an increase in its concentration in the body and a reduction in its excretion.

As stated above, solifenacin may also prolong the QT interval. Therefore, administering it concomitantly with drugs which also have this effect, such as moxifloxacin or pimozide, can theoretically increase the risk of arrhythmia.

== Pharmacology ==
=== Mechanism of action ===
Solifenacin is a competitive cholinergic receptor antagonist, selective for the M_{3} receptor subtype. However, it is said to also act as an antagonist of the other four muscarinic acetylcholine receptors.

The binding of acetylcholine to these receptors, particularly M_{3}, plays a critical role in the contraction of smooth muscle. By preventing the binding of acetylcholine to these receptors, solifenacin reduces smooth muscle tone in the bladder, allowing the bladder to retain larger volumes of urine and reducing the number of micturition, urgency and incontinence episodes. Because of a long elimination half life, a once-a-day dose can offer 24-hour control of the urinary bladder smooth muscle tone.

=== Pharmacokinetics ===
Peak plasma concentrations are reached three to eight hours after absorption from the gut. In the bloodstream, 98% of the substance are bound to plasma proteins, mainly acidic ones. Metabolism is mediated by the liver enzyme CYP3A4 and possibly others. There is one known active metabolite, 4R-hydroxysolifenacin, and three inactive ones, the N-glucuronide, the N-oxide and the 4R-hydroxy-N-oxide. The elimination half-life is 45 to 68 hours. 69% of the substance, both in its original form and as metabolites, are excreted renally and 23% via the feces.

== Chemistry ==
Like other anticholinergics, solifenacin is an ester of a carboxylic acid containing (at least) an aromatic ring with an alcohol containing a nitrogen atom. While in the prototype anticholinergic atropine the bicyclic ring is tropane, solifenacin replaces it with quinuclidine.

The free base is a yellow oil, while the salt solifenacin succinate forms yellowish crystals.

== History ==
The compound was studied using animal models by the Yamanouchi Pharmaceutical Co., Ltd. of Tokyo, Japan. It was known as YM905 when under study in the early 2000s.

Solifenacin was approved for medical used in the United States in 2004 with an indication to treat overactive bladder in adults 18 years and older.

In May 2020, solifenacin was approved for medical use in the United States with an indication to treat neurogenic detrusor overactivity (NDO), a form of bladder dysfunction related to neurological impairment, in children ages two years and older.

The efficacy of solifenacin to treat neurogenic detrusor overactivity (NDO) was established in two clinical trials with a total of 95 pediatric NDO participants, ages two to 17 years old. The studies were designed to measure (as a primary efficacy endpoint) the maximum amount of urine the bladder could hold after 24 weeks of treatment. In the first study, 17 participants ages two to less than five years old were able to hold an average of 39 mL more urine than when the study began. In the second study, 49 participants ages five to 17 years were able to hold an average of 57 mL more urine than when the study began. Reductions in spontaneous bladder contractions, bladder pressure and number of incontinence episodes were also observed in both studies. The approval of Vesicare LS was granted to Astellas Pharma US, Inc.

== Society and culture ==
The international nonproprietary name (INN) is solifenacin. It is manufactured and marketed by Astellas, GlaxoSmithKline and Teva Pharmaceutical Industries.

=== Cost ===
A 2006 cost-effectiveness study found that 5 mg solifenacin had the lowest cost and highest effectiveness among anticholinergic drugs used to treat overactive bladder in the United States, with an average medical cost per successfully treated patient of $6863 per year. By 2019, with the introduction of generics, the retail cost of a month's supply was down to $20 in the US.
