= Osaterone =

Chemical compound

Clinical data
- Other names: TZP-5258; Gestoxarone; 2-Oxachloromadinone; 17α-Hydroxy-6-chloro-2-oxa-6-dehydroprogesterone; 17α-Hydroxy-6-chloro-2-oxapregna-4,6-diene-3,20-dione
- ATCvet code: QG04CX90 (WHO)

Identifiers
- IUPAC name: (1R,3aS,3bR,9aR,9bS,11aS)-1-acetyl-5-chloro-1-hydroxy-9a,11a-dimethyl-2,3,3a,3b,9,9b,10,11-octahydroindeno[4,5-h]isochromen-7-one
- CAS Number: 105149-04-0
- PubChem CID: 3047806
- ChemSpider: 2310122
- UNII: XPI95TLO4O
- CompTox Dashboard (EPA): DTXSID40883157

Chemical and physical data
- Formula: C_{20}H_{25}ClO_{4}
- Molar mass: 364.87 g·mol^{−1}
- 3D model (JSmol): Interactive image
- SMILES: CC(=O)[C@]1(CC[C@@H]2[C@@]1(CC[C@H]3[C@H]2C=C(C4=CC(=O)OC[C@]34C)Cl)C)O
- InChI: InChI=1S/C20H25ClO4/c1-11(22)20(24)7-5-14-12-8-16(21)15-9-17(23)25-10-18(15,2)13(12)4-6-19(14,20)3/h8-9,12-14,24H,4-7,10H2,1-3H3/t12-,13+,14+,18-,19+,20+/m1/s1; Key:ZLLOIFNEEWYATC-XMUHMHRVSA-N

Osaterone (developmental code name TZP-5258), also known as 17α-hydroxy-6-chloro-2-oxa-6-dehydroprogesterone, as well as 2-oxachloromadinone, is a steroidal antiandrogen and progestin that was never marketed. The C17α acetate ester of osaterone, osaterone acetate, in contrast, has been marketed.
