= ATC code G04 =

ATC code G04 Urologicals is a therapeutic subgroup of the Anatomical Therapeutic Chemical Classification System, a system of alphanumeric codes developed by the World Health Organization (WHO) for the classification of drugs and other medical products. Subgroup G04 is part of the anatomical group G Genito-urinary system and sex hormones.

Codes for veterinary use (ATCvet codes) can be created by placing the letter Q in front of the human ATC code: for example, QG04. ATCvet codes without corresponding human ATC codes are cited with the leading Q in the following list.
National versions of the ATC classification may include additional codes not present in this list, which follows the WHO version.

== G04B Urologicals ==
=== G04BA Acidifiers ===
G04BA01 Ammonium chloride
G04BA03 Calcium chloride
QG04BA90 Methionine

=== G04BC Urinary concrement solvents ===
Empty group

=== G04BD Drugs for urinary frequency and incontinence ===
G04BD01 Emepronium
G04BD02 Flavoxate
G04BD03 Meladrazine
G04BD04 Oxybutynin
G04BD05 Terodiline
G04BD06 Propiverine
G04BD07 Tolterodine
G04BD08 Solifenacin
G04BD09 Trospium
G04BD10 Darifenacin
G04BD11 Fesoterodine
G04BD12 Mirabegron
G04BD13 Desfesoterodine
G04BD14 Imidafenacin
G04BD15 Vibegron

=== G04BE Drugs used in erectile dysfunction ===
G04BE01 Alprostadil
G04BE02 Papaverine
G04BE03 Sildenafil
G04BE04 Yohimbin
G04BE05 Phentolamine
G04BE06 Moxisylyte
G04BE07 Apomorphine
G04BE08 Tadalafil
G04BE09 Vardenafil
G04BE10 Avanafil
G04BE11 Udenafil
G04BE30 Combinations
G04BE52 Papaverine, combinations

=== QG04BQ Urinary alkalizers ===
QG04BQ01 Sodium bicarbonate

=== G04BX Other urologicals ===
G04BX01 Magnesium hydroxide
G04BX03 Acetohydroxamic acid
G04BX06 Phenazopyridine
G04BX10 Succinimide
G04BX11 Collagen
G04BX12 Phenyl salicylate
G04BX13 Dimethyl sulfoxide
G04BX14 Dapoxetine
G04BX15 Pentosan polysulfate sodium
G04BX16 Tiopronin
G04BX17 Sodium salicylate and methenamine
QG04BX56 Phenazopyridine, combinations
QG04BX90 Ephedrine
QG04BX91 Phenylpropanolamine

== G04C Drugs used in benign prostatic hypertrophy ==
=== G04CA Alpha-adrenoreceptor antagonists ===
G04CA01 Alfuzosin
G04CA02 Tamsulosin
G04CA03 Terazosin
G04CA04 Silodosin
G04CA51 Alfuzosin and finasteride
G04CA52 Tamsulosin and dutasteride
G04CA53 Tamsulosin and solifenacin
G04CA54 Tamsulosin and tadalafil
G04CA55 Doxazosin and finasteride

=== G04CB Testosterone-5-alpha reductase inhibitors ===
G04CB01 Finasteride
G04CB02 Dutasteride
G04CB51 Finasteride and tadalafil

=== G04CX Other drugs used in benign prostatic hypertrophy ===
G04CX01 Prunus africanae cortex
G04CX02 Sabalis serrulatae fructus
G04CX03 Mepartricin
G04CX04 Fexapotide
QG04CX90 Osaterone
