= Propiverine =

Chemical compound

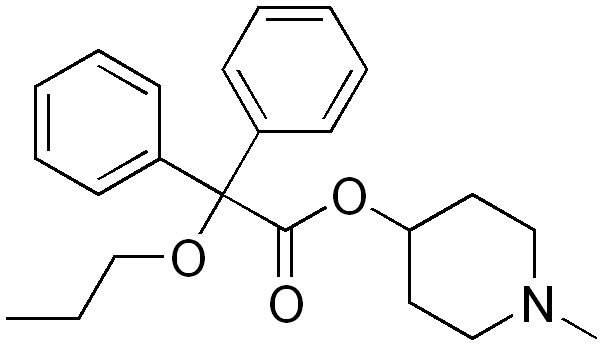

Clinical data
- AHFS/Drugs.com: International Drug Names
- ATC code: G04BD06 (WHO)

Legal status
- Legal status: CA: ℞-only

Pharmacokinetic data
- Elimination half-life: 20.1 h

Identifiers
- IUPAC name: 1-methylpiperidin-4-yl diphenyl(propoxy)acetate
- CAS Number: 60569-19-9; HCl: 54556-98-8
- PubChem CID: 4942
- ChemSpider: 4773
- UNII: 468GE2241L; HCl: DC4GZD10H3
- CompTox Dashboard (EPA): DTXSID5048265

Chemical and physical data
- Formula: C_{23}H_{29}NO_{3}
- Molar mass: 367.489 g·mol^{−1}
- 3D model (JSmol): Interactive image
- SMILES: CCCOC(C1=CC=CC=C1)(C2=CC=CC=C2)C(=O)OC3CCN(CC3)C
- InChI: InChI=1S/C23H29NO3/c1-3-18-26-23(19-10-6-4-7-11-19,20-12-8-5-9-13-20)22(25)27-21-14-16-24(2)17-15-21/h4-13,21H,3,14-18H2,1-2H3; Key:QPCVHQBVMYCJOM-UHFFFAOYSA-N

Propiverine is an anticholinergic drug used for the treatment of urinary urgency, frequency and urge incontinence, all symptoms of overactive bladder syndrome. It is a muscarinic antagonist.
