= Desfesoterodine =

Chemical compound

Clinical data
- ATC code: G04BD13 (WHO)

Identifiers
- IUPAC name: 2-[(1R)-3-(Diisopropylamino)-1-phenylpropyl]-4-(hydroxymethyl)phenol
- CAS Number: 207679-81-0
- PubChem CID: 9819382
- ChemSpider: 7995131
- UNII: YU871O78GR
- KEGG: D10853
- CompTox Dashboard (EPA): DTXSID40431319
- ECHA InfoCard: 100.228.649

Chemical and physical data
- Formula: C_{22}H_{31}NO_{2}
- Molar mass: 341.495 g·mol^{−1}
- 3D model (JSmol): Interactive image
- SMILES: CC(C)N(CC[C@H](C1=CC=CC=C1)C2=C(C=CC(=C2)CO)O)C(C)C
- InChI: InChI=1S/C22H31NO2/c1-16(2)23(17(3)4)13-12-20(19-8-6-5-7-9-19)21-14-18(15-24)10-11-22(21)25/h5-11,14,16-17,20,24-25H,12-13,15H2,1-4H3/t20-/m1/s1; Key:DUXZAXCGJSBGDW-HXUWFJFHSA-N

Desfesoterodine (INN, also called 5-hydroxymethyltolterodine) is an antimuscarinic drug. It is the active metabolite of fesoterodine, its isobutyrate ester.
