= Bladder training =

Urinating at specific times

Bladder training, also known as scheduled voiding and bladder re-education, is urinating at specific times of the day. It is used as a first line treatment of overactive bladder or mixed urinary incontinence.

== Bladder training ==
Bladder training is a behavioral therapy aimed at improving bladder control and managing urinary incontinence. It is a non-invasive intervention commonly employed for various types of incontinence, including urge incontinence, stress incontinence, and mixed incontinence. The therapy focuses on gradually increasing the time intervals between voiding episodes to increase the bladder's capacity and reduce involuntary urine leakage.

== Overview ==
Bladder training is based on the principle that the bladder can be conditioned to hold larger volumes of urine and reduce involuntary contractions. It requires active participation from individuals, making it most suitable for those who are physically and cognitively capable of adhering to scheduled voiding regimens.

This approach is typically used in both primary and secondary care settings and is often combined with other treatments such as pelvic floor muscle training or pharmacological interventions. The therapy has been particularly recommended for those with symptoms of overactive bladder.

== Mechanism of action ==
Bladder training works by progressively increasing the time between voiding episodes, encouraging individuals to resist the urge to urinate and suppress involuntary bladder contractions. Over time, this helps reduce the frequency and severity of incontinence episodes. The therapy also emphasizes complementary techniques, such as distraction and relaxation, to help individuals manage sudden urinary urges. Consistent adherence to the program is key to its success.

== Components ==
Bladder training programs typically involve the following steps:

1. Education: Patients are informed about the function of the bladder, causes of incontinence, and the goals of bladder training. This foundational knowledge helps them understand the importance of adhering to the therapy.
2. Scheduled Voiding: Patients follow a fixed schedule for urination, gradually extending the interval between bathroom visits by 15–30 minutes each week until they achieve a target interval of 3–4 hours.
3. Urge Suppression Techniques: Techniques such as distraction, deep breathing, or pelvic floor muscle contractions are taught to manage sudden urges.

=== Additional techniques ===
Some programs incorporate complementary approaches to enhance the effectiveness of bladder training:

- Pelvic Floor Exercises: These exercises are often recommended alongside bladder training to improve overall bladder control.
- Fluid and Diet Management: Patients are advised to modify fluid intake and avoid bladder irritants such as caffeine, alcohol, and spicy foods.

== Effectiveness ==
A 2023 systematic review by Funada et al. evaluated the effectiveness of bladder training in treating overactive bladder compared to anticholinergic medications and no treatment. The review found that:

- Bladder training significantly improved urinary symptoms, including reducing frequency and urgency episodes.
- Patients reported fewer adverse events compared to those receiving pharmacological treatments.
- The intervention was associated with a higher perceived rate of cure and better patient satisfaction.

A 2024 meta-analysis by Fitz et al. further supported these findings, highlighting the importance of individualized treatment plans and patient education to enhance adherence and outcomes.

== Practical considerations ==
Bladder training is generally recommended as a first-line treatment for managing urinary incontinence, particularly for individuals with overactive bladder. It is especially useful for patients who prefer non-invasive approaches or who cannot tolerate the side effects of medications.

=== Suitable candidates ===
Bladder training is most effective for individuals who:

- Are physically and mentally capable of following a structured voiding schedule.
- Are motivated and able to use self-monitoring techniques, such as keeping a bladder diary.

Healthcare providers, such as nurses or physiotherapists, play a key role in educating patients and supporting them throughout the therapy.

== Future research ==
Further research is needed to:

- Establish long-term adherence rates and their impact on the effectiveness of bladder training.
- Investigate how bladder training outcomes differ across diverse demographic groups, including older adults and men.
- Explore the integration of bladder training with newer technologies, such as biofeedback tools.
