= Muscarinic acetylcholine receptor M3 =

Protein and coding gene in humans

CHRM3
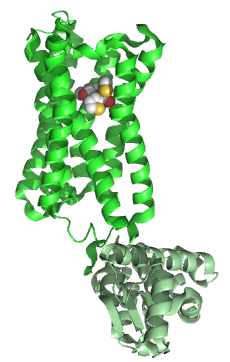

Identifiers
- Aliases: CHRM3, EGBRS, HM3, PBS, cholinergic receptor muscarinic 3
- External IDs: OMIM: 118494; MGI: 88398; GeneCards: CHRM3
Available structures
| PDB | Ortholog search: PDBe RCSB |
| PDB | List of PDB id codes 2CSA |

Gene location (Human)
| Chr. | Chromosome 1 (human) |
| Band | 1q43 | Start | 239,386,565 bp |
| Band | 1q43 | End | 239,915,452 bp |

Gene location (Mouse)
| Chr. | Chromosome 13 (mouse) |
| Band | 13 A1|13 3.72 cM | Start | 9,925,522 bp |
| Band | 13 A1|13 3.72 cM | End | 10,410,883 bp |
RNA expression pattern
| Bgee | Human / Mouse (ortholog); Top expressed in: endothelial cell; Brodmann area 23; middle temporal gyrus; parotid gland; lateral nuclear group of thalamus; postcentral gyrus; superior frontal gyrus; entorhinal cortex; orbitofrontal cortex; primary visual cortex / Top expressed in: granulocyte; dentate gyrus of hippocampal formation granule cell; primary visual cortex; superior frontal gyrus; zygote; urethra; neural layer of retina; pretectal area; tongue; secondary oocyte; More reference expression data |
| BioGPS | n/a |
Gene ontology
| Molecular function | G protein-coupled receptor activity; acetylcholine binding; signal transducer activity; protein binding; phosphatidylinositol phospholipase C activity; G protein-coupled acetylcholine receptor activity; signaling receptor activity; G protein-coupled serotonin receptor activity; neurotransmitter receptor activity |
| Cellular component | axon terminus; integral component of membrane; postsynaptic membrane; membrane; synapse; integral component of plasma membrane; cell junction; basolateral plasma membrane; dendrite; asymmetric synapse; plasma membrane; glutamatergic synapse; integral component of presynaptic membrane; integral component of postsynaptic density membrane |
| Biological process | smooth muscle contraction; G protein-coupled acetylcholine receptor signaling pathway; G protein-coupled receptor signaling pathway; saliva secretion; nervous system development; adenylate cyclase-inhibiting G protein-coupled acetylcholine receptor signaling pathway; regulation of vasoconstriction; phospholipase C-activating G protein-coupled acetylcholine receptor signaling pathway; cell population proliferation; positive regulation of smooth muscle contraction; regulation of vascular associated smooth muscle contraction; signal transduction; synaptic transmission, cholinergic; G protein-coupled receptor signaling pathway, coupled to cyclic nucleotide second messenger; chemical synaptic transmission; G protein-coupled serotonin receptor signaling pathway; positive regulation of vascular associated smooth muscle contraction |
Sources:Amigo / QuickGO
Orthologs
| Databases | NCBI: entry; OMA: entry |
| Species | Human | Mouse |
| Entrez | 1131 | 12671 |
| Ensembl | ENSG00000133019 | ENSMUSG00000046159 |
| UniProt | P20309 | Q9ERZ3 |
| RefSeq (mRNA) | NM_000740; NM_001347716; NM_001375978; NM_001375979; NM_001375980 NM_001375981; NM_001375982; NM_001375983; NM_001375984; NM_001375985 | NM_033269 |
| RefSeq (protein) | NP_000731; NP_001334645; NP_001362907; NP_001362908; NP_001362909 NP_001362910; NP_001362911; NP_001362912; NP_001362913; NP_001362914 | NP_150372 |
| Location (UCSC) | Chr 1: 239.39 – 239.92 Mb | Chr 13: 9.93 – 10.41 Mb |
| PubMed search |
- Wikidata
| View/Edit Human | View/Edit Mouse |

The muscarinic acetylcholine receptor, also known as cholinergic/acetylcholine receptor M_{3}, or the muscarinic 3, is a muscarinic acetylcholine receptor encoded by the human gene CHRM3.

The M_{3} muscarinic receptors are located at many places in the body, e.g., smooth muscles, the bladder, the endocrine glands, the exocrine glands, lungs, pancreas and the brain. In the CNS, they induce emesis. Muscarinic M_{3} receptors are expressed in regions of the brain that regulate insulin homeostasis, such as the hypothalamus and dorsal vagal complex of the brainstem. These receptors are highly expressed on pancreatic beta cells and are critical regulators of glucose homeostasis by modulating insulin secretion. In general, they cause smooth muscle contraction and increased glandular secretions.

They are unresponsive to PTX and CTX.

== Mechanism ==
Like the M_{1} muscarinic receptor, M_{3} receptors are coupled to G proteins of class G_{q}, which upregulate phospholipase C and, therefore, inositol trisphosphate and intracellular calcium as a signalling pathway. The calcium function in vertebrates also involves activation of protein kinase C and its effects.

== Effects ==
=== Smooth muscle ===
Because the M_{3} receptor is G_{q}-coupled and mediates an increase in intracellular calcium, it typically causes constriction of smooth muscle, such as that observed during bronchoconstriction. However, with respect to vasculature, activation of M_{3} on vascular endothelial cells causes increased synthesis of nitric oxide, which diffuses to adjacent vascular smooth muscle cells and causes their relaxation and vasodilation, thereby explaining the paradoxical effect of parasympathomimetics on vascular tone and bronchiolar tone. Indeed, direct stimulation of vascular smooth muscle M_{3} mediates vasoconstriction in pathologies wherein the vascular endothelium is disrupted.

=== Diabetes ===
The muscarinic M_{3} receptor regulates insulin secretion from the pancreas and are an important target for understanding the mechanisms of type 2 diabetes mellitus.

Some antipsychotic drugs that are prescribed to treat schizophrenia and bipolar disorder (such as olanzapine and clozapine) have a high risk of diabetes side-effects. These drugs potently bind to and block the muscarinic M_{3} receptor, which causes insulin dysregulation that may precede diabetes.

=== Other ===
The M_{3} receptors are also located in many glands, both endocrine and exocrine glands, and help to stimulate secretion in salivary glands and other glands of the body.

Other effects are:

- increased secretions from stomach
- eye accommodation

== Ligands ==
=== Agonists ===
No highly selective M3 agonists are yet available as of 2018, but a number of non-selective muscarinic agonists are active at M3.

- acetylcholine
- bethanechol
- carbachol
- L-689,660 (mixed M1/M3 agonist)
- oxotremorine
- pilocarpine (in eye)
- muscarine

=== Antagonists ===
- atropine
- AZD9164
- tramadol
- hyoscyamine
- aclidinium bromide
- 4-DAMP (1,1-Dimethyl-4-diphenylacetoxypiperidinium iodide, CAS# 1952-15-4)
- darifenacin
- diphenhydramine
- DAU-5884 (8-Methyl-8-azabicyclo-3-endo[1.2.3]oct-3-yl-1,4-dihydro-2-oxo-3(2H)-quinazolinecarboxylic acid ester, CAS# 131780-47-7)
- HL-031,120 ((3R,2'R)-enantiomer of EA-3167)
- ipratropium
- J-104,129 ((aR)-a-Cyclopentyl-a-hydroxy-N-[1-(4-methyl-3-pentenyl)-4-piperidinyl]benzeneacetamide, CAS# 244277-89-2)
- oxybutynin
- procyclidine
- tiotropium
- tolterodine
- zamifenacin ((3R)-1-[2-(1-,3-Benzodioxol-5-yl)ethyl]-3-(diphenylmethoxy)piperidine, CAS# 127308-98-9)
- solifenacin

== Interactions ==
Muscarinic acetylcholine receptor M3 has been shown to pre-couple with Gq proteins. The polybasic c-tail of the receptor is necessary for the pre-coupling. It has also been shown to interact with Arf6 and ARF1.

== See also ==
- Muscarinic acetylcholine receptor
