= AZD9164 =

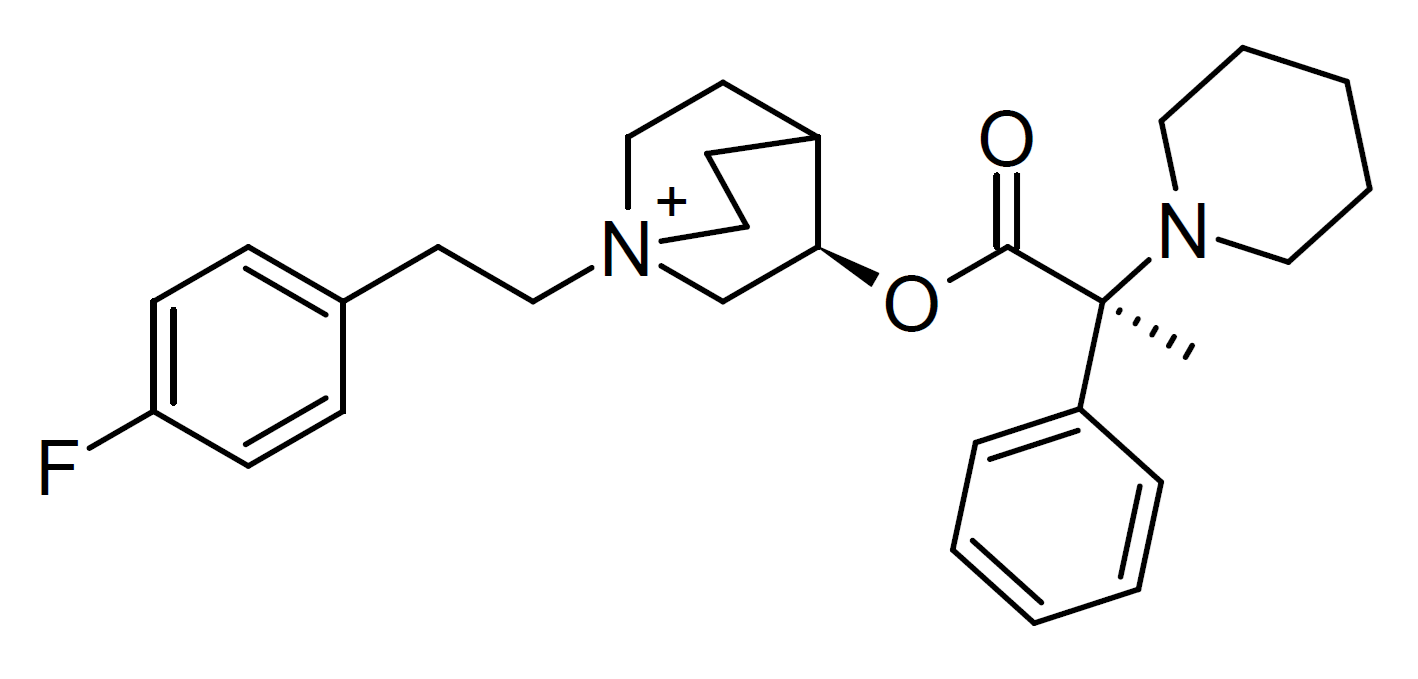

Identifiers
- IUPAC name: [(3R)-1-[2-(4-fluorophenyl)ethyl]-1-azoniabicyclo[2.2.2]octan-3-yl] (2S)-2-phenyl-2-piperidin-1-ylpropanoate
- CAS Number: (free azonium ion) 1034978-04-5 (free azonium ion) 1034916-72-7 (bromide salt)
- PubChem CID: 44517831
- DrugBank: DB12115
- ChemSpider: 28481905
- UNII: 977LWC4O5D
- ChEMBL: ChEMBL1921904

Chemical and physical data
- Formula: C_{29}H_{38}FN_{2}O_{2}
- Molar mass: 465.633 g·mol^{−1}
- 3D model (JSmol): Interactive image
- SMILES: C[C@](C1=CC=CC=C1)(C(=O)O[C@H]2C[N+]3(CCC2CC3)CCC4=CC=C(C=C4)F)N5CCCCC5
- InChI: InChI=1S/C29H38FN2O2/c1-29(25-8-4-2-5-9-25,31-17-6-3-7-18-31)28(33)34-27-22-32(20-15-24(27)16-21-32)19-14-23-10-12-26(30)13-11-23/h2,4-5,8-13,24,27H,3,6-7,14-22H2,1H3/q+1/t24?,27-,29-,32?/m0/s1; Key:FNYFFCOCVNTJCD-NNMXADRKSA-N

AZD9164 is an experimental drug that acts as a potent and selective antagonist of the muscarinic acetylcholine receptor M3. It contains a quaternary nitrogen atom with a permanent positive charge and so is always encountered as a salt, usually paired with a bromide. It has been investigated for the treatment of chronic obstructive pulmonary disease (COPD) and reached phase II human clinical trials but did not progress to further development, however it is still used for research into the M3 receptor and its function.
