= Fesoterodine =

Chemical compound

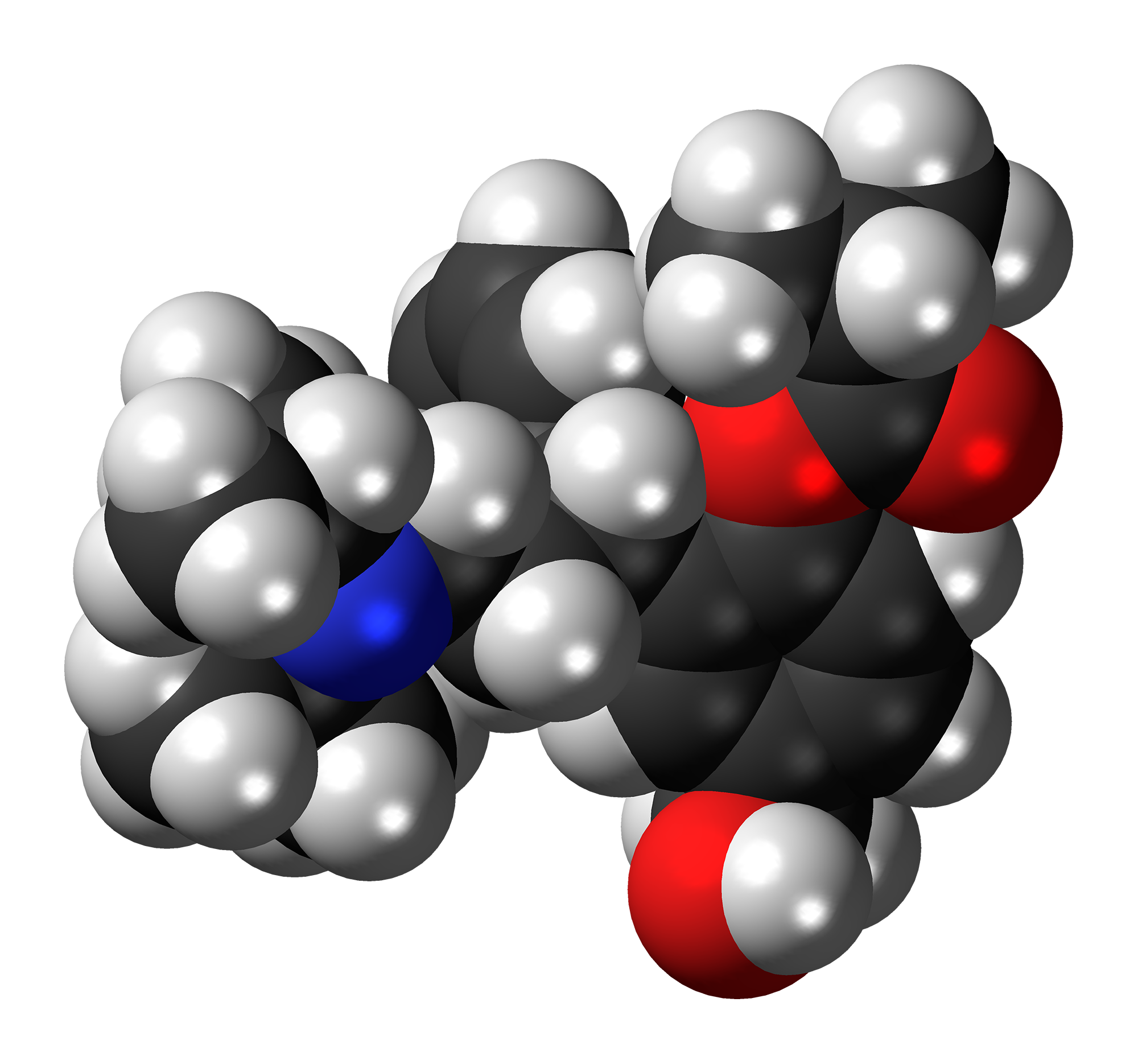

Clinical data
- Trade names: Fesobig, Toviaz
- AHFS/Drugs.com: Monograph
- MedlinePlus: a609021
- License data: US DailyMed: Fesoterodine
- Routes of administration: By mouth
- ATC code: G04BD11 (WHO)

Legal status
- Legal status: CA: ℞-only; US: ℞-only; EU: Rx-only

Pharmacokinetic data
- Bioavailability: 52% (active metabolite)
- Protein binding: 50% (active metabolite)
- Metabolism: Liver (CYP2D6- and 3A4-mediated)
- Elimination half-life: 7–8 hours (active metabolite)
- Excretion: Kidney (70%) and fecal (7%)

Identifiers
- IUPAC name: [2-[(1R)-3-(Di(propan-2-yl)amino)-1-phenylpropyl]-4-(hydroxymethyl)phenyl] 2-methylpropanoate
- CAS Number: 286930-02-7
- PubChem CID: 6918558
- IUPHAR/BPS: 7473
- DrugBank: DB06702
- ChemSpider: 5293755
- UNII: 621G617227
- KEGG: D07226
- ChEMBL: ChEMBL1201764
- CompTox Dashboard (EPA): DTXSID80182853
- ECHA InfoCard: 100.184.854

Chemical and physical data
- Formula: C_{26}H_{37}NO_{3}
- Molar mass: 411.586 g·mol^{−1}
- 3D model (JSmol): Interactive image
- SMILES: O=C(Oc1ccc(cc1[C@@H](c2ccccc2)CCN(C(C)C)C(C)C)CO)C(C)C
- InChI: InChI=1S/C26H37NO3/c1-18(2)26(29)30-25-13-12-21(17-28)16-24(25)23(22-10-8-7-9-11-22)14-15-27(19(3)4)20(5)6/h7-13,16,18-20,23,28H,14-15,17H2,1-6H3/t23-/m1/s1; Key:DCCSDBARQIPTGU-HSZRJFAPSA-N

Fesoterodine (INN, used as the fumarate under the brand name Toviaz) is an antimuscarinic drug developed by Schwarz Pharma AG to treat overactive bladder syndrome (OAB). It was approved by the European Medicines Agency in April 2007, the US Food and Drug Administration on October 31, 2008 and Health Canada on February 9, 2012.

Fesoterodine is a prodrug. It is broken down into its active metabolite, desfesoterodine, by plasma esterases.

== Efficacy ==
Fesoterodine has the advantage of allowing more flexible dosage than other muscarinic antagonists. Its tolerability and side effects are similar to other muscarinic antagonists and as a new drug seems unlikely to make great changes in practices of treatment for overactive bladder.

A Japanese study from 2017, showed that urgency and urge incontinence are improved after 3 days administration of the drug, with full efficacy able to be judged after 7 days administration. Overactive bladder was found to be resolved in 88% of patients after seven days usage.
