= Meladrazine =

Chemical compound

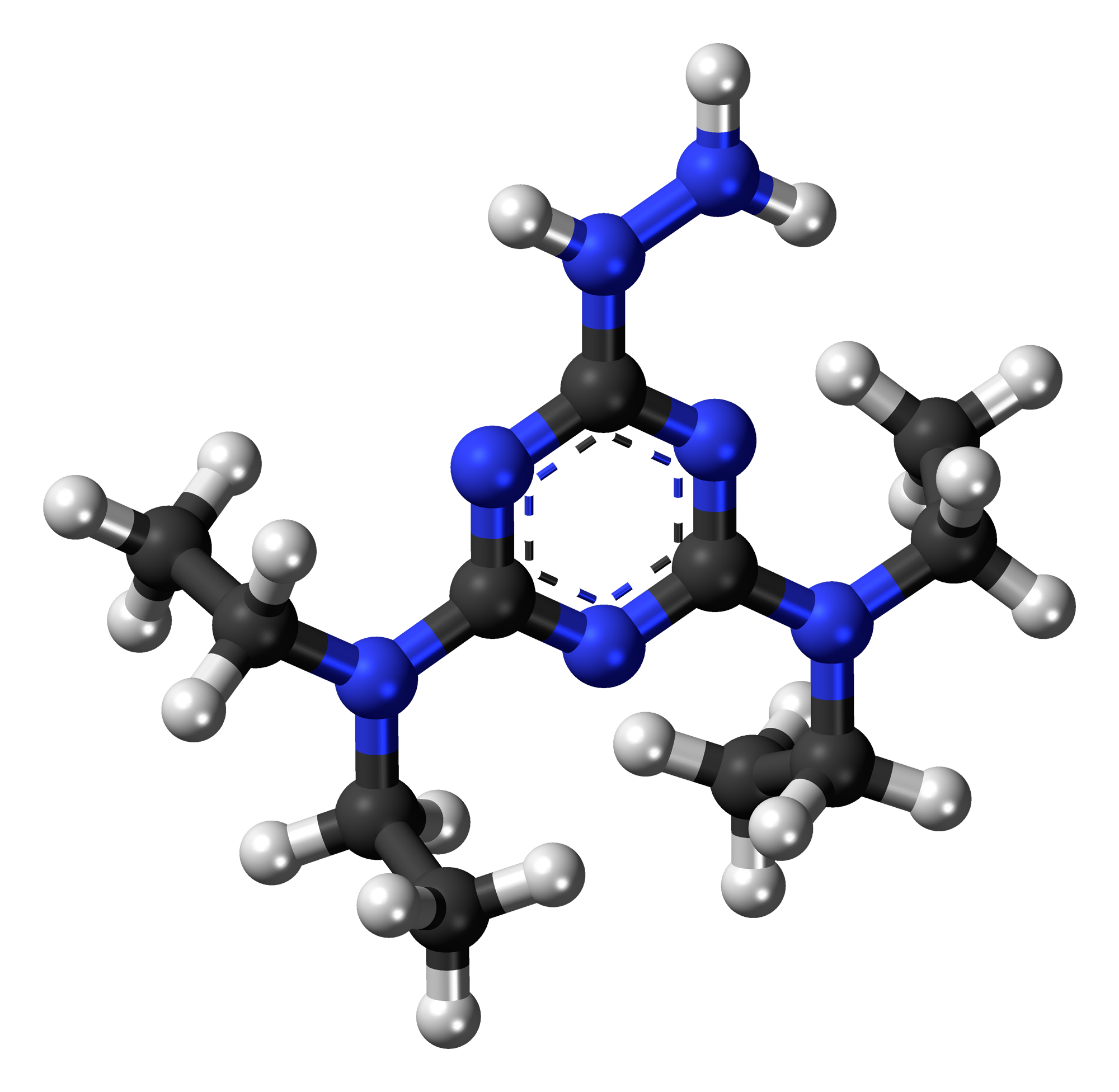

Clinical data
- ATC code: G04BD03 (WHO)

Identifiers
- IUPAC name: N^{2},N^{2},N^{4},N^{4}-Tetraethyl-6-hydrazinyl-1,3,5-triazine-2,4-diamine
- CAS Number: 13957-36-3
- PubChem CID: 71679
- ChemSpider: 64733
- UNII: 2V6Z0JG2X0
- KEGG: D07225
- CompTox Dashboard (EPA): DTXSID20161107
- ECHA InfoCard: 100.034.292

Chemical and physical data
- Formula: C_{11}H_{23}N_{7}
- Molar mass: 253.354 g·mol^{−1}
- 3D model (JSmol): Interactive image
- SMILES: CCN(CC)C1=NC(=NN)N=C(N1)N(CC)CC
- InChI: InChI=1S/C11H23N7/c1-5-17(6-2)10-13-9(16-12)14-11(15-10)18(7-3)8-4/h5-8,12H2,1-4H3,(H,13,14,15,16); Key:IRQOBYXMACIFKD-UHFFFAOYSA-N

Meladrazine is a drug used in urology as an antispasmodic.
