= Terodiline =

Chemical compound

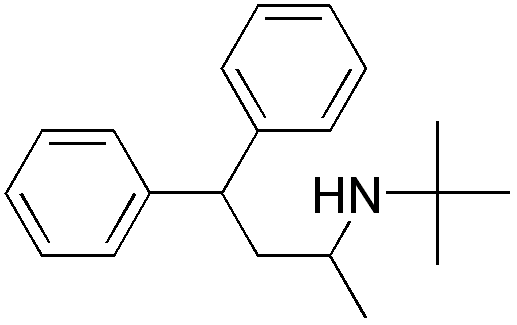

Clinical data
- ATC code: G04BD05 (WHO)

Identifiers
- IUPAC name: N-tert-butyl-4,4-di(phenyl)butan-2-amine
- CAS Number: 15793-40-5 7082-21-5 (hydrochloride)
- PubChem CID: 23480
- ChemSpider: 21952
- UNII: 70KG06964W
- ChEMBL: ChEMBL363295
- CompTox Dashboard (EPA): DTXSID60860001

Chemical and physical data
- Formula: C_{20}H_{27}N
- Molar mass: 281.443 g·mol^{−1}
- 3D model (JSmol): Interactive image
- SMILES: c1ccccc1C(c2ccccc2)CC(NC(C)(C)C)C
- InChI: InChI=1S/C20H27N/c1-16(21-20(2,3)4)15-19(17-11-7-5-8-12-17)18-13-9-6-10-14-18/h5-14,16,19,21H,15H2,1-4H3; Key:UISARWKNNNHPGI-UHFFFAOYSA-N

Terodiline is a drug used in urology as an antispasmodic.

It relaxes the smooth muscle and used to reduce bladder tone in treatment of urinary frequency and incontinence. Muscle relaxation caused by terodiline, is probably due to its anticholinergic and calcium antagonist activity.

However, it also blocks Kv11.1 ion channels and consequently can pose a risk for torsades de pointes. This cardiotoxicity is concentration dependent.
