= Overactive bladder =

Condition where a person has a frequent need to urinate

- Other names: Overactive bladder syndrome
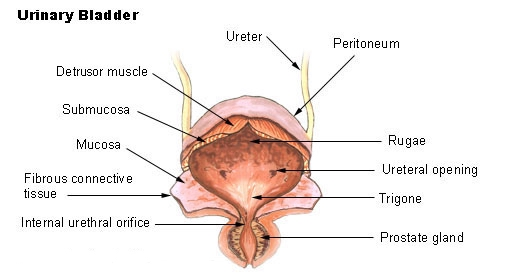
- Specialty: Urology
- Symptoms: Frequent feeling of needing to urinate, incontinence
- Complications: UTIs, anxiety
- Usual onset: More common with age
- Duration: Chronic
- Types: Age-related, or Secondary to other illness
- Causes: Old age; detrusor muscle injury; over-consumption of water and caffeine; UTI; pelvic injury
- Risk factors: Old age, obesity, caffeine, constipation
- Diagnostic method: Based on symptoms after ruling out other possible causes
- Differential diagnosis: Other neurological conditions
- Treatment: Pelvic floor exercises, bladder training, drinking moderate fluids, weight loss, medications, Botox, surgery
- Medication: Anticholinergic drugs, β3 agonists
- Prognosis: Often but not always incurable
- Frequency: ~40% of elderly adults, increasing with age

Overactive bladder (OAB) is a common condition where there is a frequent feeling of needing to urinate to a degree that it negatively affects a person's life. Overactive bladder is characterized by a group of four symptoms: urgency, urinary frequency, nocturia, and urge incontinence.

Urinary frequency is defined as urinating more than about 7-8 times in one day. The frequent need to urinate may occur during the day, at night, or both. The number of episodes varies depending on sleep, fluid intake, medications, and up to seven is considered normal if consistent with the other factors.

In addition, patients with OAB experience urinary urgency, a sudden feeling that they have to get to the bathroom very quickly.

Lastly, they may experience nocturia, which is waking up at night to urinate.

Loss of bladder control (urge incontinence) is a form of urinary incontinence characterized by the involuntary loss of urine occurring for no apparent reason while feeling urinary urgency as discussed above, and often occurs with this condition. This condition is also sometimes characterized by a sudden and involuntary contraction of the bladder muscles, in response to excitement or anticipation.

OAB is distinct from stress urinary incontinence (SUI), but when they occur together, the condition is usually known as mixed urinary incontinence. Treatment of mixed urinary incontinence usually focuses on the more bothersome component between OAB and SUI.

Overactive bladder affects approximately 11% of the population and more than 40% of people with overactive bladder have incontinence. Conversely, about 40% to 70% of urinary incontinence is due to overactive bladder. Overactive bladder is not life-threatening, but most people with the condition have problems for years.

== Pathophysiology ==
The cause of overactive bladder is unknown. It is often associated with overactivity of the detrusor urinae muscle, a pattern of bladder muscle contraction observed during urodynamics. Risk factors include obesity, caffeine, and constipation. Poorly controlled diabetes, poor functional mobility, and chronic pelvic pain may worsen the symptoms. People often have the symptoms for a long time before seeking treatment and the condition is sometimes identified by caregivers.

=== Catheter-related irritation ===
If bladder spasms occur or there is no urine in the drainage bag when a catheter is in place, the catheter may be blocked by blood, thick sediment, or a kink in the catheter or drainage tubing. Sometimes spasms are caused by the catheter irritating the bladder, prostate or penis. Such spasms can be controlled with medication such as butylscopolamine, although most people eventually adjust to the irritation and the spasms go away.

== Diagnosis ==
Diagnosis of OAB is made primarily on the person's signs and symptoms and by ruling out other possible causes such as urinary tract infections, stones, bladder cancer or neurological conditions.

Patients often complete a bladder diary, where they detail the frequency, timing and volume of each time they urinate, in addition to symptoms like urgency, leakage, and fluid intake which provides the provider detailed information about bladder health and function.

For thorough evaluation, patients may require a cystoscopy to rule out anything abnormal within the bladder, and urodynamic testing to further test the bladder function and filling abilities.

OAB causes similar symptoms to some other conditions such as urinary tract infection (UTI), bladder cancer, and benign prostatic hyperplasia (BPH). Urinary tract infections often involve pain and hematuria (blood in the urine) which are typically absent in OAB. Bladder cancer usually includes hematuria and can include pain, both not associated with OAB, and the common symptoms of OAB (urgency, frequency, and nocturia) may be absent. BPH frequently includes symptoms at the time of voiding as well as sometimes including pain or hematuria, and all of these are not usually present in OAB. Diabetes insipidus causes high frequency and volume, though not necessarily urgency.

== Management ==
Specific treatment of OAB is not always required. Behavioral therapy, alone or combined with other treatments such as pelvic floor exercises or bladder training, is generally more effective than any other single treatment alone while often improving patient satisfaction. Weight loss in those who are overweight, decreasing caffeine consumption, and drinking moderate fluids, can also have benefits. Medications, typically of the anti-muscarinic type, are only recommended if other measures are not effective. Medications are no more effective than behavioral methods; however, they are associated with side effects, particularly in older people. Third line therapy includes non-invasive tibial nerve stimulation, bladder botox injections and implantable sacral nerve stimulation devices. Some non-invasive electrical stimulation methods appear effective while they are in use. Urinary catheters or surgery are generally not recommended.

=== Lifestyle and behavioral therapy ===
Behavioral and lifestyle changes are commonly recommended as the first-line option for treating overactive bladder. These include bladder training, which involves scheduled voiding (urination) and gradually increasing the time between bathroom visits. Pelvic floor exercises, known as Kegel exercises, can help strengthen the muscles that control urination. Fluid management, which focuses on avoiding excessive caffeine and alcohol intake, is advised to reduce the rate at which the bladder fills and minimize irritation to the bladder. Weight management and maintaining a healthy diet contribute to overall bladder health, especially when weight loss is able to reduce abdominal compression of the bladder. Adopting these behavioral and lifestyle changes can often improve the condition and enhance the effectiveness of other treatment approaches.

Most people are not able to eliminate incontinence and other symptoms of OAB with lifestyle and behavioral modifications alone. However, numerous studies have demonstrated that these therapies are effective in improving quality of life, and some data shows that they increase the likelihood that medications can keep the OAB under control.

=== Medications ===
Medications are a common treatment option for people with overactive bladder syndrome. A number of antimuscarinic drugs (e.g., darifenacin, hyoscyamine, oxybutynin, tolterodine, solifenacin, trospium, fesoterodine) are frequently used to treat overactive bladder. Long term use, however, has been linked to dementia. β3 adrenergic receptor agonists (e.g., mirabegron, vibegron) may be used, as well.

Patients taking Oxybutynin and other anticholinergic drugs experience a 70% reduction of incontinence episode frequency, on average. Approximately 1 in 4 patients experience complete dryness while taking oxybutynin. Therefore, medication management alone is sufficient for a substantial minority, but not the majority, of patients with overactive bladder.

Comparison of overactive bladder medication
Agent	Traits
Oxybutynin (short-acting)	well known by physicians; available in market longer than other drugs for OAB; many studies provide support of effectiveness; available as generic in places including the United States; more side effects than alternatives, including dry mouth and constipation; severe dry mouth more often reported; user takes 2-3 pills a day
Oxybutynin (extended release)	fewer side effects than short-acting Oxybutynin; 1 pill per day
Oxybutynin (transdermal patch)	no pill; patch changed every 3–4 days; lower rate of dry mouth as compared to pill form; patch commonly causes skin irritation which can be severe
Oxybutynin (Topical medication)	fewer side effects than short-acting Oxybutynin; topical gel applied to abdomen, arms, or thighs daily; new on market; little existing research on this drug
Tolterodine (short-acting)	fewer side effects than short-acting Oxybutynin; 2 pills per day; 10% of Caucasians and 19% of black people have a genetic difference which causes them to lack a certain enzyme. Lack of this enzyme makes the drug less effective.
Tolterodine (extended release)	fewer side effects than short-acting Oxybutynin; 1 pill per day; 10% of Caucasians and 19% of black people have a genetic difference which causes them to lack a certain enzyme. Lack of this enzyme makes the drug less effective.
Solifenacin	1 pill per day; More effective for some symptoms than Tolterodine; higher rates of constipation and dry mouth than tolterodine; less researched for safety and efficacy than Tolterodine and Oxybutynin
Trospium (short acting)	severe dry mouth less common than with oxybutynin; less researched for safety and efficacy than Tolterodine and Oxybutynin
Trospium (extended release)	1 pill per day; little existing research on this drug
Darifenacin	1 pill per day; less researched for safety and efficacy than Tolterodine and Oxybutynin
Fesoterodine	same metabolite as Tolterodine, but does not require that enzyme to be active; it may avoid drug interactions of Tolterodine; little existing research on this drug

=== Procedures ===
Botulinum toxin A (Botox) is approved by the Food and Drug Administration in adults with neurological conditions, including multiple sclerosis and spinal cord injury. Botulinum Toxin A injections into the bladder wall can suppress involuntary bladder contractions by blocking nerve signals and may be effective for up to 9 months. The growing knowledge of pathophysiology of overactive bladder fueled a huge amount of basic and clinical research in this field of pharmacotherapy.

Overactive bladder may be treated with electrical stimulation, which aims to reduce the contractions of the detrusor and causes urine to pass out of it. Both invasive and non-invasive electrical stimulation procedures may be used to treat overactive bladder.

==== Invasive surgeries ====
If non-invasive and pharmacological approaches are not helpful, some people may be eligible for a surgical procedure to treat overactive bladder. Surgical options may include urinary diversion, sacral neuromodulation, or augmentation cystoplasty.

One surgical intervention, called a cystoplasty, involves the enlargement of the bladder using tissue taken from the patient's ileum, which is part of the small intestine. This procedure is rarely performed, and is only done for patients who have proven resistant to all other forms of treatment. This procedure can greatly enlarge urine volume in the bladder.

== Prognosis ==
Because overactive bladder is most commonly associated with aging, the majority of patients experience symptoms (with or without incontinence) for the rest of their lives. A minority of age-related OAB cases may be cured or indefinitely suppressed by medications and behavioral modification. If the OAB is due to a different condition, such as a urinary tract infection, then symptoms should resolve after the underlying problem has been treated.

== Epidemiology ==
Earlier reports estimated that about one in six adults in the United States and Europe had OAB. The number of people affected with OAB increases with age, thus it is expected that OAB will become more common in the future as the average age of people living in the developed world is increasing. However, a recent Finnish population-based survey suggested that the number of people affected had been largely overestimated due to methodological shortcomings regarding age distribution and low participation (in earlier reports). It is suspected, then, that OAB affects approximately half the number of individuals as earlier reported.

The American Urological Association reports studies showing rates as low as 7% to as high as 27% in men and rates as low as 9% to 43% in women. Urge incontinence was reported as higher in women. Older people are more likely to be affected, and the number of symptoms increases with age.

== See also ==
- National Association For Continence
- Underactive bladder
