= National Association for Continence =

U.S. nonprofit organization

- Location: Charleston, South Carolina
- Services: Consumer Discretionary Services
- Website: Official website
- Formerly called: Help for Incontinent People

National Association for Continence (NAFC) is a national, private, non-profit organization dedicated to improving the quality of life of people with incontinence, voiding dysfunction, and related pelvic floor disorders.

NAFC's purpose is to be the leading source for public education and advocacy about the causes, prevention, diagnosis, treatments, and management alternatives for incontinence.

== History ==
The NAFC was established in 1982, and initially known as 'Help for Incontinent People'.

== Objectives ==
NAFC's objectives are to destigmatize incontinence, to promote preventive measures, to motivate individuals to seek treatment, and to provide collaborative advocacy and service for those who are affected by this problem. To achieve its objectives, NAFC offers publications and services, such as: brochures detailing what every woman and man should know about bladder and bowel control, disease-specific booklets on multiple sclerosis, spinal cord injury, and Parkinson's disease, pelvic muscle exercise kits for men and women, Quality Care e-newsletter made up of articles written by leading professionals in the field, and a live webinar (online seminar) series that brings bladder and bowel health experts right to you. The National Association For Continence is supported by consumers/patients, health professionals, and industry.

== Publications ==
NAFC has a series of educational resources relating to bladder problems.

General Audience: Bladder retraining, Urinary Catheterization of Men and Women, Fecal Incontinence, Incontinence and Odor Control, Overactive bladder.

For Women: Incontinence and Childbirth, Pelvic organ prolapse, Surgical Treatment for Female stress urinary incontinence, Non-Surgical Treatment for Female stress urinary incontinence (includes instructions for Pelvic Muscle Exercises).

For Men: Male stress incontinence, enlarged prostate, Incontinence: What Every Man Should Know (includes instructions for Pelvic Muscle Exercises).
