= Imidafenacin =

Chemical compound

Clinical data
- Routes of administration: By mouth
- ATC code: G04BD14 (WHO)

Legal status
- Legal status: In general: ℞ (Prescription only)

Identifiers
- IUPAC name: 4-(2-Methyl-1H-imidazol-1-yl)-2,2-diphenylbutanamide
- CAS Number: 170105-16-5
- PubChem CID: 6433090
- ChemSpider: 4938278
- UNII: XJR8Y07LJO
- ChEMBL: ChEMBL53366
- CompTox Dashboard (EPA): DTXSID00870104
- ECHA InfoCard: 100.216.585

Chemical and physical data
- Formula: C_{20}H_{21}N_{3}O
- Molar mass: 319.408 g·mol^{−1}
- 3D model (JSmol): Interactive image
- SMILES: CC1=NC=CN1CCC(C2=CC=CC=C2)(C3=CC=CC=C3)C(=O)N
- InChI: InChI=1S/C20H21N3O/c1-16-22-13-15-23(16)14-12-20(19(21)24,17-8-4-2-5-9-17)18-10-6-3-7-11-18/h2-11,13,15H,12,14H2,1H3,(H2,21,24); Key:SQKXYSGRELMAAU-UHFFFAOYSA-N

Imidafenacin (INN) is a urinary antispasmodic of the anticholinergic class. It is used for the treatment of urinary incontinence and related bladder issues, especially in patients with benign prostatic hyperplasia or who have had prostate surgery. Unlike most related drugs, it is orally active but still shows a rapid onset of action, which makes it more convenient to administer.
