= Acetohydroxamic acid =

Enzyme inhibitor that inhibits urease

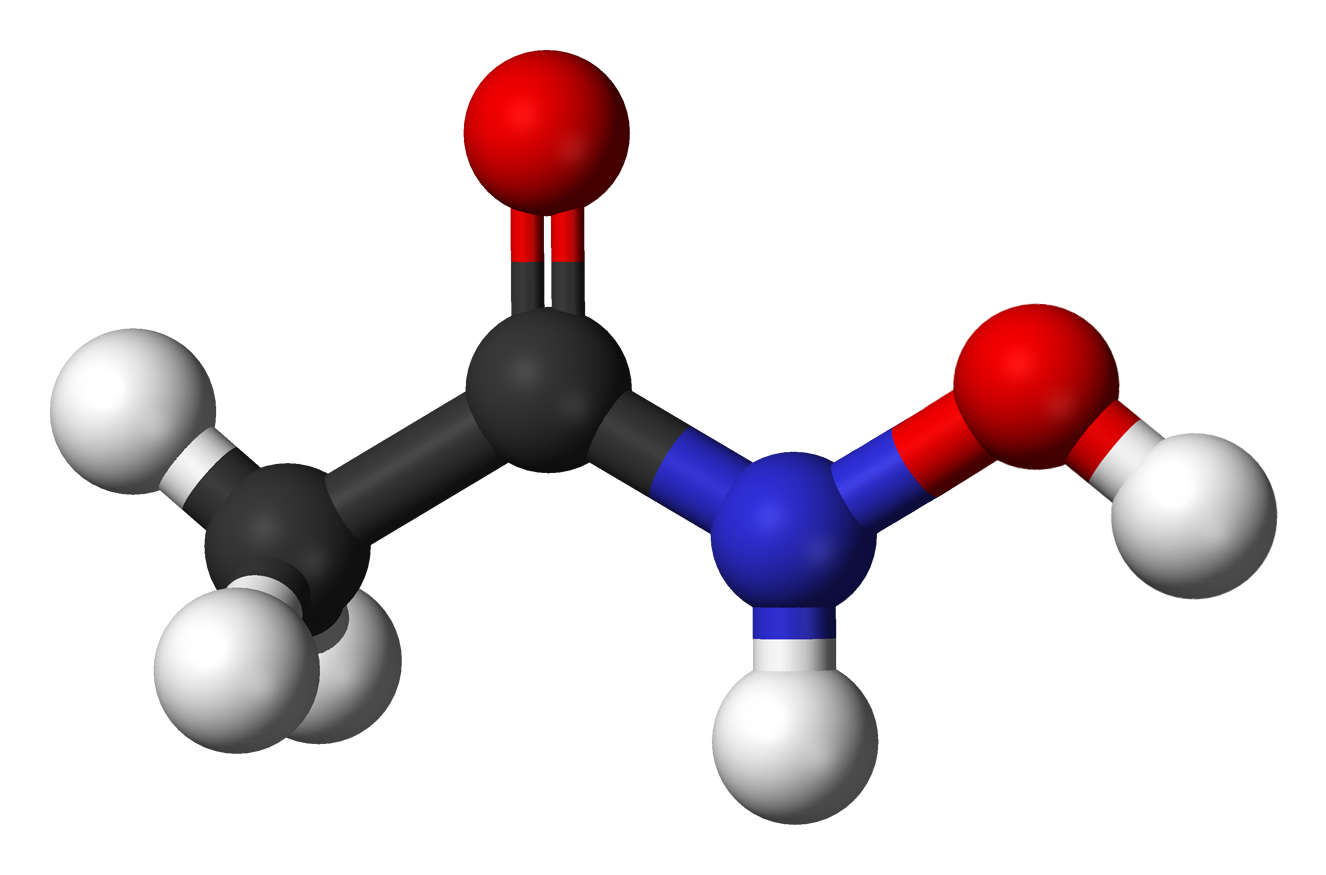

Clinical data
- Trade names: Lithostat
- AHFS/Drugs.com: Consumer Drug Information
- Pregnancy category: X
- ATC code: G04BX03 (WHO)

Legal status
- Legal status: In general: ℞ (Prescription only)

Identifiers
- IUPAC name: N-Hydroxyacetamide
- CAS Number: 546-88-3
- PubChem CID: 1990
- DrugBank: DB00551
- ChemSpider: 1913
- UNII: 4RZ82L2GY5
- KEGG: D00220
- ChEBI: CHEBI:49029
- ChEMBL: ChEMBL734
- CompTox Dashboard (EPA): DTXSID7022546
- ECHA InfoCard: 100.008.104

Chemical and physical data
- Formula: C_{2}H_{5}NO_{2}
- Molar mass: 75.067 g·mol^{−1}
- 3D model (JSmol): Interactive image
- SMILES: O=C(NO)C
- InChI: InChI=1S/C2H5NO2/c1-2(4)3-5/h5H,1H3,(H,3,4); Key:RRUDCFGSUDOHDG-UHFFFAOYSA-N

Acetohydroxamic acid (also known as AHA or by the trade name Lithostat) is a drug that is a potent and irreversible enzyme inhibitor of the urease enzyme in various bacteria and plants; it is usually used for urinary tract infections and urinary stone disease. The molecule is similar to urea but is not hydrolyzable by urease; it thus disrupts the bacteria's metabolism through competitive inhibition. It is particularly effective for the prevention and treatment of infection stones (struvite stones).

== Orphan drug ==
In 1983 the US Food and Drug Administration approved acetohydroxamic acid (AHA) as an orphan drug for "prevention of so-called struvite stones" under the newly enacted Orphan Drug Act of 1983. AHA cannot be patented because it is a standard chemical compound.

== See also ==
- Salicylhydroxamic acid
