= Oxybutynin =

Medication for overactive bladder

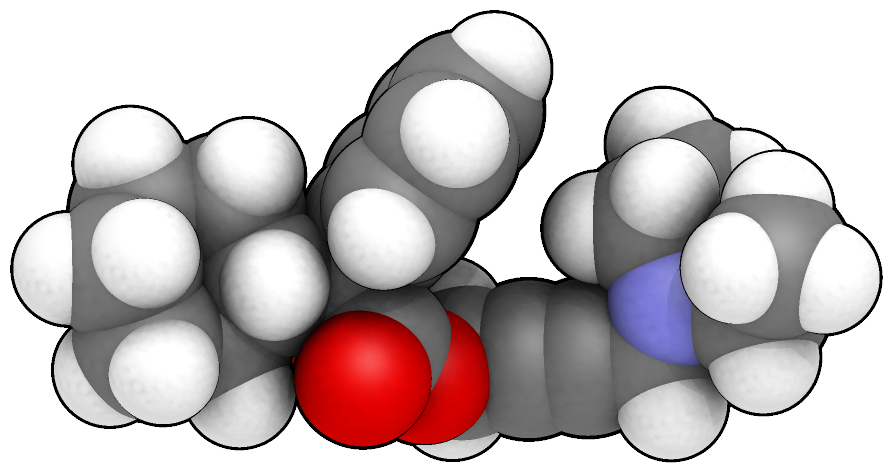

Clinical data
- Trade names: Ditropan, Gelnique, others
- AHFS/Drugs.com: Monograph
- MedlinePlus: a682141
- License data: US DailyMed: Oxybutynin
- Pregnancy category: AU: B1
- Routes of administration: By mouth, transdermal
- Drug class: Antimuscarinic
- ATC code: G04BD04 (WHO)

Legal status
- Legal status: AU: S4 (Prescription only); CA: ℞-only; UK: POM (Prescription only); US: ℞-only / OTC; EU: Rx-only

Pharmacokinetic data
- Protein binding: 91–93%
- Metabolites: N-Desethyloxybutynin
- Elimination half-life: 12.4–13.2 hours

Identifiers
- IUPAC name: 4-Diethylaminobut-2-ynyl 2-cyclohexyl-2-hydroxy-2-phenylethanoate
- CAS Number: 5633-20-5
- PubChem CID: 4634
- IUPHAR/BPS: 359
- DrugBank: DB01062
- ChemSpider: 4473
- UNII: K9P6MC7092
- KEGG: D00465
- ChEBI: CHEBI:7856
- ChEMBL: ChEMBL1231
- CompTox Dashboard (EPA): DTXSID0023406
- ECHA InfoCard: 100.158.590

Chemical and physical data
- Formula: C_{22}H_{31}NO_{3}
- Molar mass: 357.494 g·mol^{−1}
- 3D model (JSmol): Interactive image
- SMILES: O=C(OCC#CCN(CC)CC)C(O)(c1ccccc1)C2CCCCC2
- InChI: InChI=1S/C22H31NO3/c1-3-23(4-2)17-11-12-18-26-21(24)22(25,19-13-7-5-8-14-19)20-15-9-6-10-16-20/h5,7-8,13-14,20,25H,3-4,6,9-10,15-18H2,1-2H3; Key:XIQVNETUBQGFHX-UHFFFAOYSA-N

Oxybutynin, sold under the brand name Ditropan among others, is an anticholinergic medication primarily used to treat overactive bladder. It is widely considered a first-line therapy for overactive bladder due to its well-studied side effect profile, broad applicability, and continued efficacy over long periods of time. It works similarly to tolterodine, darifenacin, and solifenacin, although it is usually preferred over these medications. It is commonly prescribed after some types of bladder surgery to reduce bladder spasms and catheter-associated discomfort. It is sometimes used off-label for treatment of hyperhidrosis, or excessive sweating. It has also been used off-label to treat bedwetting in children, but this use has declined, as it is most likely ineffective in this role. It is taken by mouth or applied to the skin.

Common side effects include dry mouth, constipation, dizziness, trouble sleeping, and urinary tract infections. Serious side effects may include urinary retention and an increased risk of heat stroke. Use in pregnancy appears safe but has not been well studied while use in breastfeeding is of unclear safety. It is an antimuscarinic and works by blocking the effects of acetylcholine on smooth muscle.

Oxybutynin was approved for medical use in the US in 1975. It is available as a generic medication. In 2023, it was the 114th most commonly prescribed medication in the United States, with more than 5 million prescriptions.

== Medical use ==
Oxybutynin is used in the form of instant-release capsules, extended-release capsules, or transdermal products. All of these are considered safe and effective options for treatment of detrusor muscle-mediated overactive bladder. Extended-release formulations decrease the number of weekly incontinence episodes by an average of 90% compared to an untreated state. Some studies have identified advantages of transdermal oxybutynin over capsules, finding decreased frequency of incontinence episodes and increased average voided volume of urine.

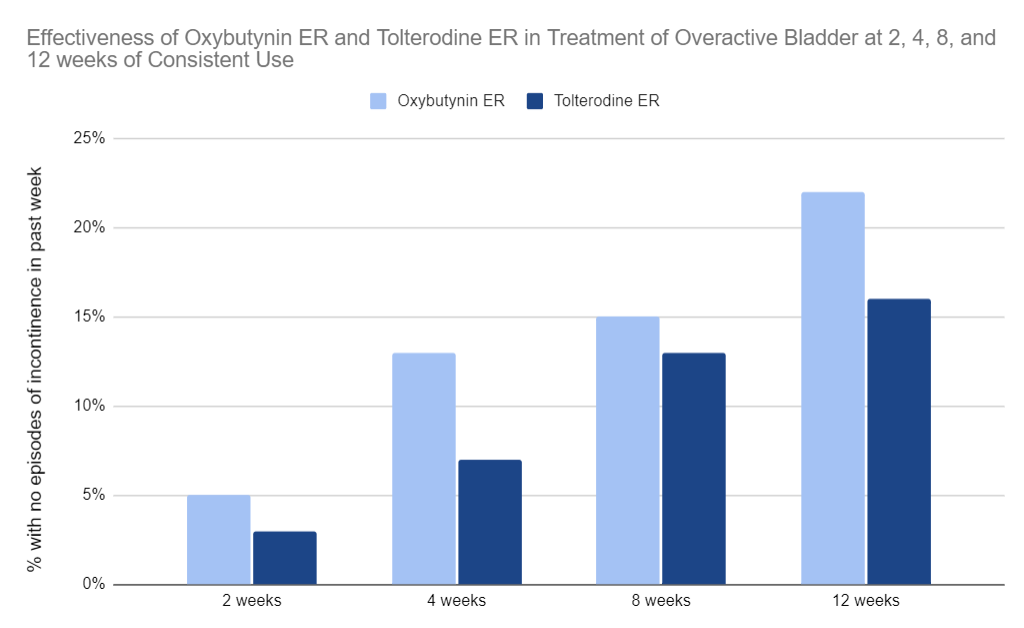
Oxybutynin is superior to other anticholinergics for treatment of overactive bladder.

Oxybutynin has been established through head-to-head trials as a more effective for overactive bladder than tolterodine, another anticholinergic medication. Specifically, the extended-release form of oxybutynin was found to have greater effect in both the short- and long-term. However, oxybutynin is not selective for the bladder like tolterodine, and thus has a wider range of side effects. Tolterodine and other anticholinergics are primarily used when clinicians and patients want to reduce the side effect profile.

Because both drugs have been studied extensively and shown relatively high efficacy, both oxybutynin and tolterodine are considered first-line treatments for overactive bladder. They are thus the typical choices for initial treatment of the condition. The choice of initial therapy often comes down to whether a patient prefers somewhat higher efficacy (oxybutynin) or somewhat reduced side effects (tolterodine).

=== Hyperhidrosis ===
Since the 2010s, oxybutynin has increasingly been used to treat hyperhidrosis (excessive sweating). Numerous studies have identified concrete benefits of the drug in treating this condition, but have not identified appropriate dosing or the full spectrum of possible side effects, although dry mouth is seemingly infrequent in patients with hyperhidrosis. Until further clinical trials can be conducted, oxybutynin is only used as an off-label medication for hyperhidrosis (as of 2024).

== Adverse effects ==
Common adverse effects that are associated with oxybutynin and other anticholinergics include: dry mouth, difficulty in urination, constipation, blurred vision, drowsiness, and dizziness. Anticholinergics have also been known to induce delirium.

Oxybutynin's tendency to reduce sweating can be dangerous. Reduced sweating increases the risk of heat exhaustion and heat stroke in apparently safe situations where normal sweating keeps others safe and comfortable. Adverse effects of elevated body temperature are more likely for the elderly and for those with health issues, especially multiple sclerosis.

N-Desethyloxybutynin is an active metabolite of oxybutynin that is thought responsible for much of the adverse effects associated with the use of oxybutynin. N-Desethyloxybutynin plasma levels may reach as much as six times that of the parent drug after administration of the immediate-release oral formulation. Alternative dosage forms have been developed in an effort to reduce blood levels of N-desethyloxybutynin and achieve a steadier concentration of oxybutynin than is possible with the instant-release form. The long-acting formulations also allow once-daily administration instead of the twice-daily dosage required with the immediate-release form. The transdermal patch, in addition to the benefits of the extended-release oral formulations, bypasses the first-pass hepatic effect that the oral formulations are subject to.

== Contraindications ==
Oxybutynin chloride is contraindicated in patients with untreated narrow angle glaucoma, and in patients with untreated narrow anterior chamber angles—since anticholinergic drugs may aggravate these conditions. It is also contraindicated in partial or complete obstruction of the gastrointestinal tract, hiatal hernia, gastroesophageal reflux disease, paralytic ileus, intestinal atony of the elderly or debilitated patient, megacolon, toxic megacolon complicating ulcerative colitis, severe colitis, and myasthenia gravis. It is contraindicated in patients with obstructive uropathy and in patients with unstable cardiovascular status in acute hemorrhage. Oxybutynin chloride is contraindicated in patients who have demonstrated hypersensitivity to the product.

== Pharmacology ==
Following oral administration, the drug is absorbed within one hour and has an elimination half-life of 2 to 5 hours. There is a wide variation among individuals in the drug's concentration in blood. This, and its low concentration in urine, suggest that it is eliminated through the liver.

=== Chemistry ===
Oxybutynin contains one stereocenter. Commercial formulations are sold as the racemate. The (R)-enantiomer, known as aroxybutynin, is a more potent anticholinergic than either the racemate or the (S)-enantiomer, known as esoxybutynin, which is essentially without anticholinergic activity at doses used in clinical practice. However, aroxybutynin administered alone offers little or no clinical benefit above and beyond the racemic mixture. The other actions (calcium antagonism, local anesthesia) of oxybutynin are not stereospecific. Esoxybutynin has not been clinically tested for its spasmolytic effects, but may be clinically useful for the same indications as the racemate, without the unpleasant anticholinergic side effects.

Enantiomers of oxybutynin
Aroxybutynin; CAS Number: 119618-21-2	Esoxybutynin; CAS Number: 119618-22-3

== Society and culture ==
=== Brand names ===
Oxybutynin is available by mouth in generic formulation and under the brand names Ditropan, Lyrinel XL, Ditrospam, Kentera, and Aquiette, as a transdermal patch under the brand name Oxytrol, and as a topical gel under the brand name Gelnique.

== Research ==
A large study linked the development of dementia in those over 65 to the use of oxybutynin, due to its anticholinergic properties.

AD109 is an experimental drug which is a combination of aroxybutynin and atomoxetine. Several peer‑reviewed studies have evaluated AD109 for the treatment of obstructive sleep apnea (OSA). Aroxybutynin is a drug that can alter tongue muscle tone during sleep. Atomoxetine is a medication that enhances chemical transmission of norepinephrine in the brain, an action that boosts muscle tone in the airway while sleeping. In combination, these drugs appear to promote airway opening and tongue function during sleep, which may lead to improvement in the signs and symptoms of sleep apnea for some people. A large phase III randomized controlled trial (SynAIRgy) demonstrated that AD109 significantly reduced apnea–hypopnea index (AHI) and improved oxygenation over 26 weeks in adults unable to tolerate positive airway pressure therapy or a CPAP device. Earlier phase II trials, including the MARIPOSA study, also reported clinically meaningful reductions in AHI and improvements in patient‑reported outcomes with AD109 compared with placebo. Additional randomized studies have shown that noradrenergic–antimuscarinic combinations can reduce upper‑airway collapsibility and improve sleep‑related muscle tone, supporting the mechanistic rationale for AD109.
