= Frequent urination =

- Other names: Urinary frequency, pollakiuria
- Specialty: Urology

Frequent urination, or urinary frequency (sometimes called pollakiuria), is the need to urinate more often than usual. Diuretics are medications that increase urinary frequency. Nocturia is the need of frequent urination at night. The most common cause of this condition for women and children is a urinary tract infection. The most common cause of urinary frequency in older men is an enlarged prostate.

Frequent urination is strongly associated with frequent incidents of urinary urgency, which is the sudden need to urinate. It is often, though not necessarily, associated with urinary incontinence and polyuria (large total volume of urine). However, in other cases, urinary frequency involves only normal volumes of urine overall.

== Definition ==
The normal number of times varies according to the age of the person. Among young children, urinating 8 to 14 times each day is typical. This decreases to 6–12 times per day for older children, and to 4–6 times per day among teenagers.

== Causes ==
The most common causes of frequent urination are:

- interstitial cystitis
- urinary tract infection
- enlarged prostate
- urethral inflammation or infection
- vaginal inflammation or infection.

Less common causes of frequent urination are:

- alcoholism
- anxiety
- bladder cancer
- caffeine
- diabetes
- pregnancy
- psychiatric medications such as clozapine
- radiation therapy to the pelvis
- brain or nervous system diseases
- stroke
- tumor in the pelvis
- kidney stones.

== Diagnosis and treatment ==
Diagnosis of the underlying cause requires a careful and thorough evaluation.

Treatment depends on the underlying cause or condition.

== See also ==
- Polyuria
- Nocturnal enuresis
