= List of Aleutian Islands =

The Aleutian Islands are divided into six major island chains, and one additional island. From east to west, they are Fox Islands, Islands of the Four Mountains, Andreanof Islands, Rat Islands, Buldir Island, Near Islands and Commander Islands. The Commander Islands are under the jurisdiction of Russia, and the rest are under the jurisdiction of the United States. Listed below are all the islands with an area of at least 0.1 square miles (0.26 km^{2}) .

English Name	Aleut Name	Island Chain	Island Subgroup	Area (sq mi)	Population	Coordinates	Political Subdivision	Notes
Adak Island	Adaax	Andreanof Islands		274.6	45	51°46′51″N 176°38′45″W	Aleutians West Census Area, Alaska, US	
Adugak Island	Adugax̂	Fox Islands		0.3		52°54′17″N 169°10′28″W	Aleutians West Census Area, Alaska, US	Rookery for endangered Steller sea lion
Agattu Island	Angatux̂	Near Islands		89.7	0	52°26′07″N 173°34′32″E	Aleutians West Census Area, Alaska, US	
Aiktak Island	Ugangax	Fox Islands	Krenitzin Islands	0.5	0	54°11′01″N 164°49′41″W	Aleutians East Census Area, Alaska, US	
Akun Island	Akungan	Fox Islands		64.4	0	54°11′18″N 165°31′43″W	Aleutians East Census Area, Alaska, US	
Akutan Island	Akutanax̂	Fox Islands		129.0	1,027	54°07′41″N 165°55′05″W	Aleutians East Census Area, Alaska, US	
Alaid Island	Igingiinax̂	Near Islands	Semichi Islands	2.8		52°45′46″N 173°53′53″E	Aleutians West Census Area, Alaska, US	
Amak Island	Amax	Fox Islands		5.8	0	55°25′06″N 163°08′38″W	Aleutians East Census Area, Alaska, US	
Amaknak Island	Amaxnax̂	Fox Islands		3.3	2,524	53°54′37″N 166°32′12″W	Aleutians West Census Area, Alaska, US	
Amatignak Island	Amatignax̂	Andreanof Islands	Delarof Islands	13.1	0	51°15′44″N 179°06′31″W	Aleutians West Census Area, Alaska, US	The southernmost point of Alaska
Amchitka Island	Amchixtax̂	Rat Islands		116.0	0	51°32′32″N 178°59′00″E	Aleutians West Census Area, Alaska, US	Site of underground nuclear weapons tests
Amlia Island	Amlax	Andreanof Islands		180.0		52°05′08″N 173°32′56″W	Aleutians West Census Area, Alaska, US	
Amukta Island	Amuux̂tax̂	Islands of Four Mountains		19.8		52°29′10″N 171°15′08″W	Aleutians West Census Area, Alaska, US	
Anagaksik Island	Anagaxsax̂	Andreanof Islands		0.2		51°51′03″N 175°53′31″W	Aleutians West Census Area, Alaska, US	
Anangula Island		Fox Islands		0.6		53°00′02″N 168°54′40″W	Aleutians West Census Area, Alaska, US	Also known as Ananiuliak Island
Anglamax		Andreanof Islands		0.3		51°44′08″N 176°30′55″W	Aleutians West Census Area, Alaska, US	
Argonne Island		Andreanof Islands		0.2		51°48′16″N 176°47′20″W	Aleutians West Census Area, Alaska, US	
Asuksak Island	Hasux̂sax̂	Andreanof Islands		0.5		51°56′02″N 176°05′32″W	Aleutians West Census Area, Alaska, US	
Atka Island	Atx̂ax̂	Andreanof Islands		404.6	95	52°08′17″N 174°26′43″W	Aleutians West Census Area, Alaska, US	
Attu Island	Atan	Near Islands		344.7	0	52°54′09″N 172°54′34″E	Aleutians West Census Area, Alaska, US	Largest unpopulated island in the United States, occupied by Japan during World War II
Avatanak Island	Agutanax̂	Fox Islands	Krenitzin Islands	13.8	0	54°04′18″N 165°18′14″W	Aleutians East Census Area, Alaska, US	
Aziak Island	Haazax	Andreanof Islands		0.6	0	51°57′02″N 176°09′23″W	Aleutians West Census Area, Alaska, US	
Bering Island (Russian: остров Беринга)		Commander Islands		1,036.0	676	55°00′03″N 166°16′23″E	Aleutsky District, Kamchatka Krai, RU	The only inhabited island in the Aleutsky District
Bird Island	Kitnamax	Fox Islands		0.1		54°40′03″N 163°17′22″W	Aleutians East Census Area, Alaska, US	
Bird Rock		Rat Islands		0.1		51°39′38″N 178°38′14″E	Aleutians West Census Area, Alaska, US	
Bobrof Island	Walĝa	Andreanof Islands		3.0		51°54′30″N 177°26′20″W	Aleutians West Census Area, Alaska, US	
Bogoslof Island	Aĝasaaĝux̂	Fox Islands		0.5	0	53°55′38″N 168°02′04″W	Aleutians West Census Area, Alaska, US	Sanctuary for sea lions and nesting marine birds
Bolshoi Island	Tanax̂ Angunax̂	Andreanof Islands		0.3		52°11′47″N 174°10′43″W	Aleutians West Census Area, Alaska, US	
Buck Island	Ukdax̂sxix	Fox Islands		0.1		53°28′39″N 167°11′55″W	Aleutians West Census Area, Alaska, US	
Buldir Island	Idmaax	N/A		7.5	0	52°21′29″N 175°55′29″E	Aleutians West Census Area, Alaska, US	
Carlisle Island	Kigalĝa	Islands of Four Mountains		16.7		52°53′38″N 170°03′15″W	Aleutians West Census Area, Alaska, US	
Caton Island	Qagan Unimgix̂	Fox Islands	Sanak Islands	7.4		54°23′42″N 162°26′02″W	Aleutians East Census Area, Alaska, US	
Chagulak Island	Chugaaĝinax̂	Islands of Four Mountains		3.7	0	52°34′20″N 171°08′29″W	Aleutians West Census Area, Alaska, US	
Chisak Island	Hatmax	Andreanof Islands		0.2		51°47′41″N 176°08′28″W	Aleutians West Census Area, Alaska, US	
Chuginadak Island	Tanax̂ Angunax̂	Islands of Four Mountains		64.0	0	52°50′41″N 169°49′05″W	Aleutians West Census Area, Alaska, US	
Chugul Island	Chiĝulax̂	Andreanof Islands		6.6		51°56′37″N 175°49′14″W	Aleutians West Census Area, Alaska, US	
Crone Island		Andreanof Islands		0.4		51°40′20″N 176°38′05″W	Aleutians West Census Area, Alaska, US	
Davidof Island	Qanan-tanax	Rat Islands		1.3		51°57′36″N 178°20′03″E	Aleutians West Census Area, Alaska, US	
Deer Island	Animin	Fox Islands		58.6	0	54°54′43″N 162°19′34″W	Aleutians East Census Area, Alaska, US	
Dora Island		Andreanof Islands		0.5		51°48′43″N 176°47′30″W	Aleutians West Census Area, Alaska, US	
Egg Island	Ugalĝa	Fox Islands		0.5	0	53°51′46″N 166°02′38″W	Aleutians West Census Area, Alaska, US	One of two different islands named Egg Island
Egg Island	Alim-tanaa	Andreanof Islands		0.2		52°10′30″N 174°26′36″W	Aleutians West Census Area, Alaska, US	One of two different islands named Egg Island
Elf Island		Andreanof Islands		1.2		51°42′30″N 176°31′59″W	Aleutians West Census Area, Alaska, US	
Emerald Island		Fox Islands		0.2		53°17′20″N 167°51′29″W	Aleutians West Census Area, Alaska, US	
Gareloi Island	Anangusix̂	Andreanof Islands	Delarof Islands	26.0	0	51°47′09″N 178°47′56″W	Aleutians West Census Area, Alaska, US	
Great Sitkin Island	Stitxinax̂	Andreanof Islands		60.0		52°03′29″N 176°07′10″W	Aleutians West Census Area, Alaska, US	
Gull Island		Fox Islands		0.1		53°40′07″N 166°49′03″W	Aleutians West Census Area, Alaska, US	
Hawadax Island	Hawadax	Rat Islands		10.7		51°48′09″N 178°17′51″E	Aleutians West Census Area, Alaska, US	
Herbert Island	Chiĝulax	Islands of Four Mountains		21.0		52°45′11″N 170°07′10″W	Aleutians West Census Area, Alaska, US	
Hog Island	Uknadax	Fox Islands		0.2		53°54′13″N 166°34′25″W	Aleutians West Census Area, Alaska, US	
Igitkin Island	Igitxix̂	Andreanof Islands		8.2		51°58′55″N 175°53′44″W	Aleutians West Census Area, Alaska, US	
Ikiginak Island	Ikiiĝinax̂	Andreanof Islands		0.2		51°58′39″N 175°29′28″W	Aleutians West Census Area, Alaska, US	
Ilak Island	Iilax̂	Andreanof Islands	Delarof Islands	0.5	0	51°28′40″N 178°17′14″W	Aleutians West Census Area, Alaska, US	
Kagalaska Island	Qigalaxsix̂	Andreanof Islands		44.9		51°48′06″N 176°21′28″W	Aleutians West Census Area, Alaska, US	
Kagamil Island	Qagaamila	Islands of Four Mountains		16.8		52°59′35″N 169°42′43″W	Aleutians West Census Area, Alaska, US	
Kaligagan Island	Qisxagan	Fox Islands	Krenitzin Islands	0.3	0	54°08′33″N 164°54′49″W	Aleutians East Census Area, Alaska, US	
Kanaga Island	Kanaga	Andreanof Islands		142.0		51°44′21″N 177°26′38″W	Aleutians West Census Area, Alaska, US	
Kanu Island	Yunax̂	Andreanof Islands		1.4		51°56′28″N 176°02′37″W	Aleutians West Census Area, Alaska, US	
Kasatochi Island	Qanan-tanax	Andreanof Islands		2.0	0	52°10′17″N 175°31′06″W	Aleutians West Census Area, Alaska, US	
Kavalga Island	Qawalĝa	Andreanof Islands	Delarof Islands	5.6	0	51°33′19″N 178°48′07″E	Aleutians West Census Area, Alaska, US	
Khvostof Island	Atanax̂	Rat Islands		0.9		51°58′50″N 178°16′36″E	Aleutians West Census Area, Alaska, US	
Kigul Island	Kiigalux̂	Fox Islands		0.2		53°02′49″N 168°26′43″W	Aleutians West Census Area, Alaska, US	
Kiska Island	Qisxa	Rat Islands		107.2	0	51°57′51″N 177°27′36″E	Aleutians West Census Area, Alaska, US	Occupied by Japan during World War II
Koniuji Island	Tanĝimax	Andreanof Islands		0.4	0	51°59′16″N 176°35′30″W	Aleutians West Census Area, Alaska, US	
Kudiakof Islands		Fox Islands		4.5		55°20′58″N 162°52′16″W	Aleutians East Census Area, Alaska, US	Two barrier islands outlining the Izembek Lagoon
Little Kiska Island	Kangxhix̂	Rat Islands		2.9		51°57′06″N 177°39′15″E	Aleutians West Census Area, Alaska, US	
Little Sitkin Island	Sitignax̂	Rat Islands		24.3		51°56′55″N 178°30′15″E	Aleutians West Census Area, Alaska, US	
Little Tanaga Island	Tanagax̂	Andreanof Islands		26.7		51°50′37″N 176°09′51″W	Aleutians West Census Area, Alaska, US	
Medny Island (Russian: остров Медный)		Commander Islands		72.0	0	54°42′24″N 167°43′02″E	Aleutsky District, Kamchatka Krai, RU	
Nizki Island	Avayax̂	Near Islands	Semichi Islands	2.8	0	52°44′28″N 173°59′08″E	Aleutians West Census Area, Alaska, US	
North Island	Chihngax̂	Andreanof Islands		0.2		51°50′04″N 176°47′48″W	Aleutians West Census Area, Alaska, US	
Ogangen Island		Fox Islands		1.1		53°26′47″N 166°52′32″W	Aleutians West Census Area, Alaska, US	
Ogliuga Island	Aglaga	Andreanof Islands	Delarof Islands	1.9	0	51°36′22″N 178°39′23″E	Aleutians West Census Area, Alaska, US	
Oglodak Island	Ungluudâ	Andreanof Islands		1.5	0	51°59′03″N 175°27′17″W	Aleutians West Census Area, Alaska, US	
Peter Island		Fox Islands		0.2		53°41′38″N 166°50′31″W	Aleutians West Census Area, Alaska, US	
Poa Island	Saduuĝinax̂	Fox Islands		0.2		54°07′38″N 165°29′59″W	Aleutians East Census Area, Alaska, US	
Ringgold Island	Tanam Aduu	Andreanof Islands		0.6		51°48′08″N 176°49′15″W	Aleutians West Census Area, Alaska, US	
Rootok Island	Aayux̂tax̂	Fox Islands	Krenitzin Islands	5.2	0	54°02′41″N 165°31′55″W	Aleutians East Census Area, Alaska, US	
Sadatanak Island	Sadan-tanax̂	Andreanof Islands		0.5		52°01′58″N 174°25′12″W	Aleutians West Census Area, Alaska, US	
Sagchudak Island	Saĝuugax̂	Andreanof Islands		0.8		52°01′17″N 174°29′26″W	Aleutians West Census Area, Alaska, US	
Salt Island	Uladax	Andreanof Islands		0.5		52°10′19″N 174°38′26″W	Aleutians West Census Area, Alaska, US	
Samalga Island	Samalĝa	Fox Islands		1.8	0	52°47′00″N 169°12′17″W	Aleutians West Census Area, Alaska, US	
Sanak Island	Sanaĝax	Fox Islands	Sanak Islands	45.6	0	54°25′47″N 162°42′32″W	Aleutians East Census Area, Alaska, US	
Sea Otter Rocks (Russian: Камни Бобровые)		Commander Islands		0.2	0	54°52′33″N 167°26′08″E	Aleutsky District, Kamchatka Krai, RU	
Sedanka Island	Sidaanax̂	Fox Islands		39.9	0	53°47′00″N 166°11′29″W	Aleutians West Census Area, Alaska, US	
Seguam Island	Saĝuugamax	Andreanof Islands		80.0	1	52°19′24″N 172°27′58″W	Aleutians West Census Area, Alaska, US	
Segula Island	Chiĝulax̂	Rat Islands		13.3		52°01′21″N 178°07′58″E	Aleutians West Census Area, Alaska, US	
Semisopochnoi Island	Unyax	Rat Islands		86.4	0	51°57′05″N 179°36′03″E	Aleutians West Census Area, Alaska, US	Easternmost point in the United States by longitude
Shemya Island	Samiyax̂	Near Islands	Semichi Islands	5.9		52°43′27″N 174°07′08″E	Aleutians West Census Area, Alaska, US	
Skagul Island	Sxaĝulax̂	Andreanof Islands	Delarof Islands	1.7	0	51°35′51″N 178°35′17″E	Aleutians West Census Area, Alaska, US	
Staten Island	Iluuĝix̂ Tanax̂	Andreanof Islands		0.4		51°47′54″N 176°47′02″W	Aleutians West Census Area, Alaska, US	
Tagadak Island	Tanadax	Andreanof Islands		0.9		51°57′23″N 176°00′24″W	Aleutians West Census Area, Alaska, US	
Tagalak Island	Tagalax̂	Andreanof Islands		5.7		51°57′44″N 175°43′12″W	Aleutians West Census Area, Alaska, US	
Tanadak Island	Tanaadax̂	Andreanof Islands	Delarof Islands	0.3	0	52°21′15″N 179°00′58″W	Aleutians West Census Area, Alaska, US	One of three different islands in the Aleutians named Tanadak Island, the other two being less than 0.1 square miles
Tanaga Island	Tanax̂ax	Andreanof Islands		204.0	0	51°47′34″N 177°55′43″W	Aleutians West Census Area, Alaska, US	
Tanaklak Island	Tanaqlax̂	Andreanof Islands		1.5		51°57′18″N 176°06′47″W	Aleutians West Census Area, Alaska, US	
Tanax Angunax		Andreanof Islands		0.2		52°06′40″N 174°12′07″W	Aleutians West Census Area, Alaska, US	One of three different islands in the Aleutians named Tanax Angunax, the other two being less than 0.1 square miles
Tan'gan		Fox Islands	Baby Islands	0.1		53°59′50″N 166°03′52″W	Aleutians West Census Area, Alaska, US	
Tidgituk Island	Aakutanas	Andreanof Islands		0.1		51°38′00″N 178°00′34″W	Aleutians West Census Area, Alaska, US	
Tigalda Island	Qigalĝan	Fox Islands	Krenitzin Islands	35.0	0	54°05′48″N 165°03′27″W	Aleutians East Census Area, Alaska, US	
Tufted Puffin Rock (Russian: Остров Топорков)		Commander Islands		0.1	0	55°12′21″N 165°56′03″E	Aleutsky District, Kamchatka Krai, RU	
Ugamak Island	Ugangax̂	Fox Islands	Krenitzin Islands	4.2	0	54°12′44″N 164°49′15″W	Aleutians East Census Area, Alaska, US	
Ulak Island		Andreanof Islands		0.2		52°02′44″N 175°54′01″W	Aleutians West Census Area, Alaska, US	One of two different islands named Ulak Island
Ulak Island	Uulax	Andreanof Islands	Delarof Islands	12.1	0	51°21′54″N 178°56′50″W	Aleutians West Census Area, Alaska, US	One of two different islands named Ulak Island
Uliaga Island	Ulaĝa	Islands of Four Mountains		3.4	0	53°03′58″N 169°46′00″W	Aleutians West Census Area, Alaska, US	
Umak Island	Uhmax̂	Andreanof Islands		14.3		51°53′17″N 176°02′29″W	Aleutians West Census Area, Alaska, US	
Umnak Island	Unmax	Fox Islands		686.0	18	53°13′26″N 168°25′55″W	Aleutians West Census Area, Alaska, US	
Unalaska Island	Nawan-Alaxsxa	Fox Islands		1,051.0	5,638	53°40′24″N 166°38′54″W	Aleutians West Census Area, Alaska, US	Home of the city of Unalaska, the most populous city in the Aleutians
Unalga Island	Unalĝa	Andreanof Islands	Delarof Islands	0.9	0	51°34′49″N 179°02′45″E	Aleutians West Census Area, Alaska, US	
Unalga Island	Unalĝa	Fox Islands		11.0	0	53°58′35″N 166°08′39″W	Aleutians West Census Area, Alaska, US	
Unimak Island	Unimax	Fox Islands		1,571.4	35	54°46′06″N 164°11′12″W	Aleutians East Census Area, Alaska, US	Largest island in the Aleutian islands, 9th largest island in the United States and the 134th largest island in the world
Uuyax		Andreanof Islands		0.2		51°57′55″N 175°38′28″W	Aleutians West Census Area, Alaska, US	
Vsevidof Island	Uyagax̂	Fox Islands		0.9		52°58′48″N 168°28′14″W	Aleutians West Census Area, Alaska, US	
Yunaska Island	Yunax̂sxa	Islands of Four Mountains		66.8	0	52°37′53″N 170°41′49″W	Aleutians West Census Area, Alaska, US	
