= 179th meridian west =

Line of longitude

179th meridian west

The meridian 179° west of Greenwich is a line of longitude that extends from the North Pole across the Arctic Ocean, Asia, the Pacific Ocean, the Southern Ocean, and Antarctica to the South Pole.

The 179th meridian west forms a great ellipse with the 1st meridian east.

== From Pole to Pole ==
Starting at the North Pole and heading south to the South Pole, the 179th meridian west passes through:

Co-ordinates	Country, territory or sea	Notes
90°0′N 179°0′W	Arctic Ocean	
71°36′N 179°0′W	Russia	Chukotka Autonomous Okrug — Wrangel Island
70°55′N 179°0′W	Chukchi Sea	
68°47′N 179°0′W	Russia	Chukotka Autonomous Okrug
66°10′N 179°0′W	Bering Sea	Passing just west of Gareloi Island, Alaska, United States (at 51°47′N 178°52′W); Passing just east of Unalga Island, Alaska, United States (at 51°35′N 179°1′W); Passing just west of Kavalga Island, Alaska, United States (at 51°34′N 178°51′W); Passing just west of Ulak Island, Alaska, United States (at 51°22′N 178°59′W); Passing just east of Amatignak Island, Alaska, United States (at 51°15′N 179°3′W)
51°17′N 179°0′W	Pacific Ocean	Passing just east of the island of Qelelevu, Fiji (at 16°5′S 179°9′W)
17°10′S 179°0′W	Fiji	Island of Vanua Balavu
17°12′S 179°0′W	Pacific Ocean	Passing just east of the island of Mago, Fiji (at 17°27′S 179°8′W); Passing just west of the island of Tuvuca, Fiji (at 17°40′S 178°50′W); Passing just east of the island of Nayau, Fiji (at 18°0′S 179°2′W); Passing just west of the island of Lakeba, Fiji (at 18°12′S 178°50′W); Passing just west of the island of Vuaqava, Fiji (at 18°53′S 178°55′W); Passing just west of the island of Kabara, Fiji (at 18°57′S 178°59′W); Passing just west of the island of Ono-i-Lau, Fiji (at 20°39′S 178°44′W)
60°0′S 179°0′W	Southern Ocean	
78°19′S 179°0′W	Antarctica	Ross Dependency, claimed by New Zealand

== See also ==
- 178th meridian west
- 180th meridian
