= Ugidak Island =

Island in Alaska, United States

Ugidak
- Location on a map of Alaska

Geography
- Location: Bering Sea
- Coordinates: 51°34′57″N 178°30′28″E
- Archipelago: Delarof Islands
- Area: 0.15 km^{2} (0.058 sq mi)

Administration
- United States
- State: Alaska

Ugidak Island (Aleut: Qagan-tanax) is an island in the Delarof Islands subgroup of the Andreanof Islands in the Aleutian Islands chain of Alaska. It was named by Captain Mikhail Tebenkov of the Imperial Russian Navy in 1852 as Kamen 'Ugidakh (Камень in Russian means "stone").

The island is only 150 meters long and is located 5.5 km (3.4 mi) east of Skagul Island.
