= Tag Islands =

Island group in Alaska

- Location on a map of Alaska

Geography
- Location: Bering Sea
- Coordinates: 51°33′25″N 178°34′21″E
- Archipelago: Delarof Islands
- Area: 0.8 km^{2} (0.31 sq mi)

Administration
- United States
- State: Alaska

The Tag Islands (Aleut: Tagachalugis) are a groups of islands in the Delarof Islands subgroup of the Andreanof Islands in the Aleutian Islands chain of Alaska. The largest of them had been registered under its Aleutian name Tagachalugis by Captain Mikhail Tebenkov in 1852, later the whole group was referred to as the Tag Islands.
