= Tanadak Island =

Island in Alaska, United States

- Location on a map of Alaska

Geography
- Location: Bering Sea
- Coordinates: 51°21′15″N 179°00′58″W
- Archipelago: Delarof Islands
- Area: 0.8 km^{2} (0.31 sq mi)

Administration
- United States
- State: Alaska

Tanadak Island (Aleut: Tanaadax) is an island in the Delarof Islands subgroup of the Andreanof Islands in the Aleutian Islands chain of Alaska. The name was registered by Captain Mikhail Tebenkov of the Imperial Russian Navy in 1852.

The island is about 800 meters long and is located 2.5 km (1.6 mi) west of Ulak Island.

There are two other islands in the Aleutian Island chain named Tanadak Island. One is located in the Rat Islands archipelago and the other is in the Andreanof Islands off the coast of Amlia. Both are significantly smaller in area.
