= Aziak Island =

Small island in the Andreanof Islands group

Coordinates: 51°57′02″N 176°09′23″W

Location in Alaska

Aziak Island (also called Azki, Azlak, Azik, and Azaik; Russian: Азиак) is a small island in the Andreanof Islands group in the Aleutian Islands of southwestern Alaska. The name "Aziak" is derived from the Aleut word ha-azax - "ten," and in many books and charts published before 1920, it was often used to refer to Sledge Island, located 930 miles (1,500 km) to the northeast off the Seward Peninsula, or to a native settlement on that island. This practice apparently became rarer as the twentieth century progressed and today Aziak is used almost exclusively to refer the Andreanof-group island. Aziak Island is approximately 1.1 miles (1.8 km) long and reaches a maximum elevation of 190 feet (58 m). Very little is known about the island and it is uninhabited.
