= Ogliuga Island =

Island in Alaska, United States

- Location on a map of Alaska

Geography
- Location: Bering Sea
- Coordinates: 51°36′22″N 178°39′23″E
- Archipelago: Delarof Islands
- Area: 5 km^{2} (1.9 sq mi)

Administration
- United States
- State: Alaska

Ogliuga Island (Aleut: Aglaga) is an island in the Delarof Islands subgroup of the Andreanof Islands in the Aleutian Islands chain of Alaska. The island is 5 km (3.1 mi) long and its highest point is 25 m (82 ft). It is located just 1 km (0.62 mi) west of Skagul Island and 17 km (11 mi) southeast of Gareloi Island.

There is an abandoned US military airfield named Ogliuga Island Army Airfield on the island after World War II.

On Ogliuga, and on other islands of the Fox and Andreanof groups, the emperor goose is found in winter.
