= Skagul Island =

Island in the Aleutian Islands chain

- Location on a map of Alaska

Geography
- Location: Bering Sea
- Coordinates: 51°35′51″N 178°35′17″E
- Archipelago: Delarof Islands
- Length: 2.8 km (1.74 mi)
- Width: 2.5 km (1.55 mi)

Administration
- United States
- State: Alaska

Skagul Island (Aleut: Sxaĝulax) is an island in the Delarof Islands subgroup of the Andreanof Islands in the Aleutian Islands chain of Alaska. The island measures 2.8 km × 2.5 km (1.7 mi × 1.6 mi). It is located just 1 km (0.62 mi) east of Ogliuga Island and 17 km (11 mi) southeast of Gareloi Island.
