= Ante meridian =

Ante meridian is a misspelling of:

- Ante meridiem, a Latin phrase meaning 'before midday', usually abbreviated as a.m.
- Antimeridian, a meridian at 180° from another or the meridian opposite the prime meridian
