= Tanaga (disambiguation) =

Tanaga is an indigenous type of Filipino poem. Tanaga may also refer to

- Tanaga (volcano), in the Aleutian Islands, Alaska
- Tanaga Island, part of the Aleutian Islands, Alaska
- Tanaga Pass, a strait between Tanaga Island and the Delarof Islands
- Little Tanaga Island, in the Aleutian Islands, Alaska
