= Sagchudak Island =

Island in Alaska, United States

Coordinates: 52°01′17″N 174°29′26″W

Location in Alaska

Sagchudak Island (also spelled Sagtchudakh) is a small island in the Andreanof Islands group in the Aleutian Islands of southwestern Alaska. The roughly rectangular island is approximately 1.4 miles (2.3 km) long and 0.6 mi (1 km) wide and lies about 0.93 mi (1.50 km) off the southern coast of Atka Island. The island's current name is nearly identical to the native Aleut name for the island and it entered navigational charts by the early 1850s. In the 1900s and 1910s, the island was one of many Aleutian islands stocked with foxes by the United States government for hunting and fur trading purposes. Although the foxes on uninhabited Sagchudak were not directly hunted, some were occasionally trapped and moved to and from the island to help ensure genetic stability in the various separated colonies.
