= Unalga Island =

Unalga Island may refer to the following islands in Alaska:

- Unalga Island (Delarof Islands)
- Unalga Island (Fox Islands)
