= Kavalga Island =

Island in Alaska, United States

- Location on a map of Alaska

Geography
- Location: Bering Sea
- Coordinates: 51°33′19″N 178°48′7″E
- Archipelago: Delarof Islands
- Area: 9 km^{2} (3.5 sq mi)

Administration
- United States
- State: Alaska

Kavalga Island (Aleut: Qavalĝa) is an island in the Delarof Islands subgroup of the Andreanof Islands in the Aleutian Islands chain of Alaska. The island is 9 km (5.6 mi) long and its highest point is 40 m (130 ft). It is located between the islands of Unalga to the west and Ogliuga to the east.

Kavalga is populated by Marmotini (ground squirrels) and sea birds.
