= Ogliuga Island Army Airfield =

Ogliuga Island Army Airfield
- Part of Eleventh Air Force
- Ogliuga Island, Aleutian Islands, Alaska

Site information
- Type: Military airfield
- Controlled by: United States Army Air Forces

Location
- Coordinates: 51°36′22″N 178°39′23″W

Site history
- Built: 1942
- In use: 1943-1944
- Battles/wars: Aleutian Islands Campaign

Ogliuga Island Army Airfield is an abandoned airfield located on Ogliuga Island, Aleutian Islands, Alaska.

== History ==
Ogliuga Island AAF was established in 1942 as a result of the Japanese invasion of the Aleutian Islands. Its primary use was as an emergency landing field by USAAF and Naval Air aircraft during the campaign, not having any permanent units assigned. It was abandoned after World War II and only some foundations of buildings and the remnants of two runways remain. In addition, it is reported that ammunition abandoned since the war, can be found at the facility.

== See also ==
- Alaska World War II Army Airfields
