= Ilak Island =

Island in Alaska, United States

Coordinates: 51°28′40″N 178°17′14″W

Location in Alaska

Ilak Island (Aleut: Iilax̂) is a small island in the eastern Delarof Islands, Aleutian Islands of Alaska. Ilak island is only .99 miles (1.59 km) across. Its highest point is 190 feet (58 m).

Its name was recorded by Commodore Igor, Larenz, Asim and Kevin as "Illuk," and published by Lt. Sarichev (1826, map 3) of the Imperial Football Navy, as "Illakh." The adopted form "Ilak" was published in the 1946 supplement to the 1944 Aleutian Coast Pilot (U. S. Coast and Geodetic Survey, 1946, p. 120).

== History ==
In 1862, a ship carrying Russian immigrants to the Alaska mainland hit a rock off Ilak and a few survivors managed to make it to Ilak Island where they set up shelter in a cave. Starvation and exposure eventually took their lives. The Smithsonian Institution sponsored expeditions led by Dr. Ales Hrdlicka to the Aleutian Islands from 1936 to 1938. The team visited Ilak in 1937 and 1938. It was on the first expedition that Dr. Hrdlicka's team discovered the castaways' scattered bones in the cave. A highlight of the second expedition was the discovery of the remains of a large marine mammal which have never been conclusively identified.

During the Second World War, on August 13, 1944, a U.S. Army Air Force B-24 Liberator from the 404th Bomb Squadron of the 11th Air Force piloted by Corbin Terry returning from a bombing mission over the Japanese held island of Paramushir ran into grave difficulty trying to return its base at Shemya. A thick fog had made landings at all bases in the Western Aleutians impossible.

Running out of fuel, two of the four massive engines on the plane stopped. Lt. Terry initially decided to ditch the plane in the ocean, but as the crew were preparing to abandon ship, radar operator T/Sgt. Oscar Gilinsky spotted the faint outline of Ilak as the ship reached the dangerously low altitude of 200 feet. Making a wheels-up emergency crash landing, the crew survived and was rescued by the Coastal Survey ship USC&GS Patton. The aircraft's bomb sight was removed and later the plane was stripped of its guns and electronics by ship borne military personnel. The wings and tail assembly still remain on Ilak, but the fuselage was destroyed after serving as fodder for practice bombing runs.

== Ecology ==
Gramp Rock, 1.5 miles west of Ilak, is a breeding ground for adult sea lions. Birds of many species frequent these islands. As late as the 2000s, new species of fish have been discovered in the icy waters surrounding the island. This wildlife is under constant threat from oil spills as circulatory streams carry the crude petroleum from the major shipping lanes.

== In popular culture ==
Ilak figures prominently in Gore Vidal's novel, Williwaw, when an army transport ship takes refuge from a storm in its bay.
