= Unalga Island (Delarof Islands) =

Island in Alaska, United States

- Location on a map of Alaska

Geography
- Location: Bering Sea
- Coordinates: 51°34′49″N 179°02′45″E
- Archipelago: Delarof Islands

Administration
- United States
- State: Alaska

Unalga Island (Aleut: Unalĝa) is an island in the Delarof Islands subgroup of the Andreanof Islands in the Aleutian Islands chain of Alaska. It is located in the Bering Sea south of Gareloi Island, about 15 km (9 mi) west of Kavalga Island. The island, which has a diameter of just over 1 km (0.62 mi), should not be confused with the homonymous Unalga Island which is located between the islands of Akutan and Unalaska, in the Fox Islands.
