= Amlia =

Island in Alaska, United States

Coordinates: 52°04′43″N 173°31′42″W

Location in Alaska

Amlia (Aleut: Amlax; Russian: Остров Амля) is an island in the Aleutian Islands. It is located near the eastern end of the Andreanof Islands and is situated between Atka Island and Seguam Island.

The island is 46 miles (74 km) long and 8.7 miles (14.0 km) wide, with a land area of 172.1 sq mi (445.7 km^{2}), making it the 36th largest island in the United States. It has a rough terrain and reaches 2,021 feet (616 m) at its highest point. There is no permanent resident population. Amlia Island is the second-largest uninhabited island in the Aleutian Islands. Nearby islands include Agligadak, Sagigik and Tanadak.
