= Poa Island =

Island in Alaska, United States

Coordinates: 54°07′38″N 165°29′59″W

Location in Alaska

Poa Island (also called Ostrov Tumannyi or Tumannoi; the native name in Aleut is Saduuĝinax̂) is an islet located about 0.99 miles (1.59 km) off the south coast of Akun Island in the Fox Islands group of the eastern Aleutian Islands, Alaska. The island is 0.62 miles (1.00 km) long and reaches a maximum elevation of about 200 feet (61 m) above sea level. It was named for a genus of grasses in 1888 by the U.S. Bureau of Fisheries. Captain Tebenkov (1852) called it "Ostrov Tumannyi," meaning "foggy island."
