= Baby Islands =

Island group in the Aleutian Islands

Coordinates: 53°59′24″N 166°03′59″W

Location in Alaska

The Baby Islands are a group of small islands located about 1.2 miles (1.9 km) northeast of Unalga Island in the Fox Islands group of the Aleutian Islands of southwestern Alaska. The group consists of five islands ranging from 980 to 3280 feet (300 to 1000 m) long and several smaller islets. The islands are uninhabited and none of them rise more than a few metres above sea level. Large numbers of birds, notably the whiskered auklet, nest on the islands, making them a frequent stop for nature tours in the area (the group is located only 21 miles (34 km) from Dutch Harbor on Unalaska Island). However, the ocean near the islands is extremely hazardous for ships because of the shallow water and numerous rocks that lie just below water's surface.
