= Amchitka Pass =

Coordinates: 51°46′N 180°00′E

Location of Amchitka Pass in Alaska

Amchitka Pass is a strait in Alaska, United States. It is the largest pass in the Aleutian Islands on the 180th meridian, between the Rat Islands group to the west and the Delarof Islands to the east. Amchitka Pass has a least width of 50 miles (80 km) and depths of 249 feet (76 meters) to over 6,000 feet (1,800 meters). The islands on both sides of the pass should be cleared by at least 5 miles (8.0 km). Heavy tide rips have been observed off the east end of Amchitka Island. The pass is dangerous in heavy weather, particularly for small and medium craft; currents appear erratic in direction and velocities may be strong. This may account for reports of very large seas and strong tide rips.
