= Elf Island =

Island in Alaska

- Location within Alaska

Geography
- Location: Bering Sea
- Coordinates: 51°42′32″N 176°32′16″W
- Archipelago: Aleutian islands
- Length: 2 mi (3 km)
- Highest elevation: 57 m (187 ft)

Administration
- Alaska

Demographics
- Population: 0

Additional information
- Time zone: UTC-10
  - Summer (DST): UTC-9 (UTC)

Elf Island is an island in the Aleutian Islands of Alaska. It is southeast of Adak island, off the coast of Boot Bay, and west of Kagalaska Island. Its nearest city is Adak, Alaska. The etymology of the island is unrecorded.
