= Delarof Islands =

Island group in Alaska, United States

Location of Delarof Islands in Alaska

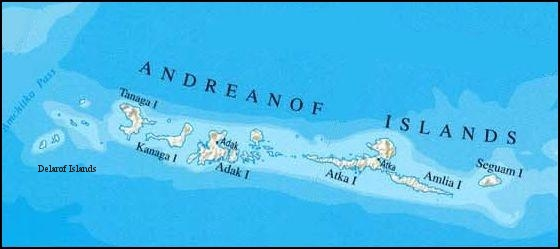
Delarof Islands located at the western end of the Andreanof Islands

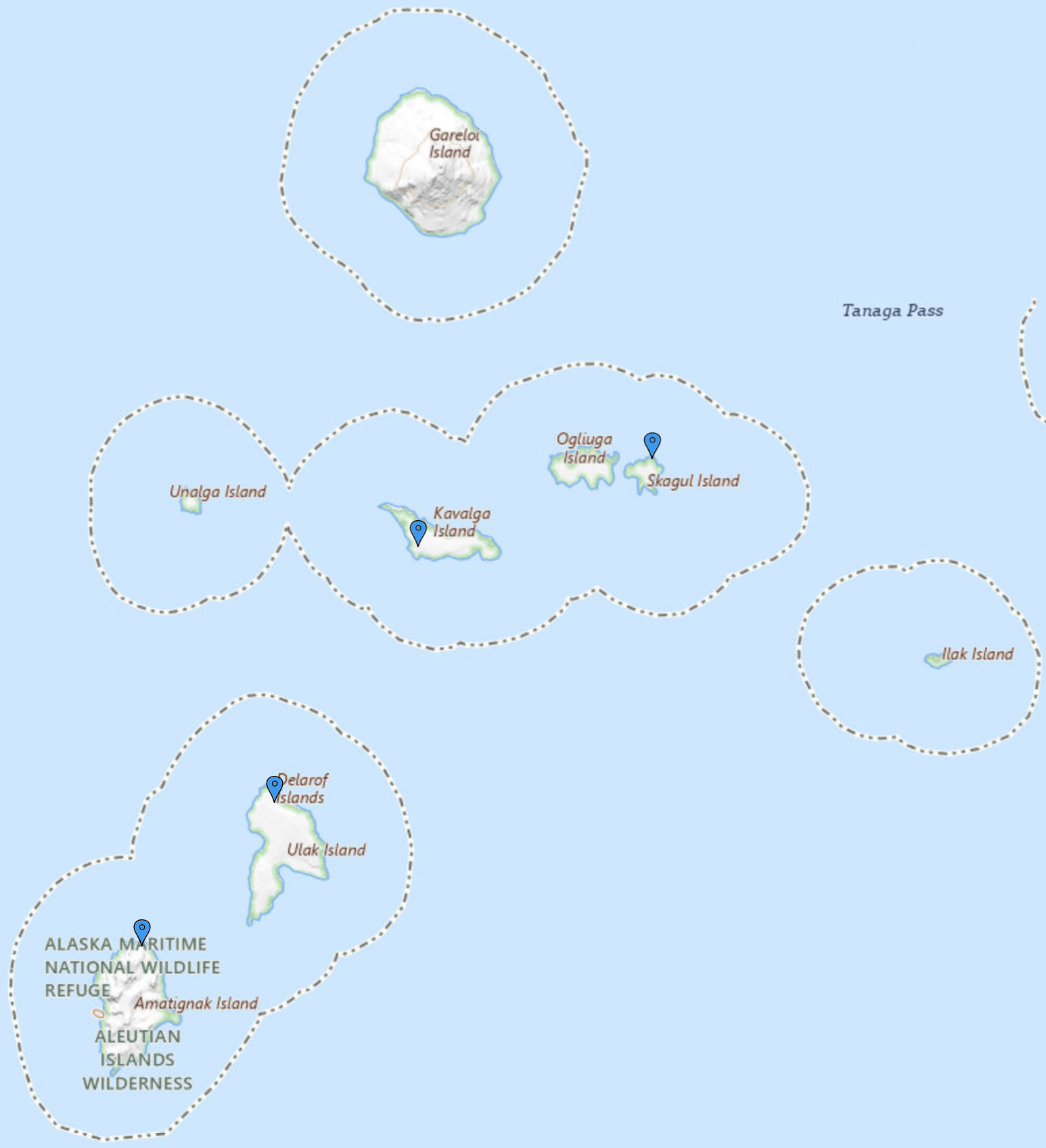
USGS map of the Delarof Islands

The Delarof Islands (Aleut: Naahmiĝun tanangis; Russian: Острова Деларова) (ca. 51°23′13″N 178°57′47″W) are a group of small islands at the extreme western end of the Andreanof Islands group in the central Aleutian Islands, Alaska. The Delarofs consist of 11 named islands (from West to East): Amatignak, Unalga (Unalĝa), Tanadak (Tanaadax̂), Ulak, Gareloi, Kavalga (Qavalĝa), Ogliuga (Aglaga), Skagul (Sxaĝulax̂), the Tag (Tagachaluĝis), Ugidak (Qagan-tanax̂), and Ilak. The northern- and southern-most named Delarof Islands are Gareloi Island and Amatignak Island respectively.

The islands were named after the 18th century Greek explorer and first de facto Governor of Alaska, Evstratios Ioannou Delarof (Ευστράτιος Ιωάννου Ντελάρωφ).

These islands are separated from the remainder of the Andreanofs by Tanaga Pass to the east and from Amchitka and Semisopochnoi (the easternmost of the Rat Islands) by Amchitka Pass to the west. All of these islands are managed as part of the Aleutian Islands Unit of the Alaska Maritime National Wildlife Refuge. The Delarof Islands together have a land area of 63.842 sq mi (165.349 km^{2}). None of the islands are populated.

The Delarof Islands were named in 1836 by Captain Fyodor Petrovich Litke of the Imperial Russian Navy. He named them after Greek-born administrator Eustrate Ivanovich Delarof (also spelled Evstratii Ivanovich Delarov), who was the chief manager of the Shelikhov-Golikov Company (precursor of the Russian-American Company) from 1787 to 1791.
