= Tanaga Pass =

Coordinates: 51°37′10″N 178°19′00″W

The Tanaga Pass is a strait between Tanaga Island and the Delarof Islands the Aleutian Islands of Alaska. It is about 40 miles (64 km) long and 13 miles (21 km) wide at its narrowest part. Tidal currents commonly range between two and three knots in the pass.

From the U.S. Coast Pilot: "Depths of 50 fathoms or more can be carried through the pass by keeping 6 miles (9.7 km) off Cape Amagalik, Tanaga Island, and 3 miles (4.8 km) off the Delarof Islands.

"The direction and velocity of the current is radically affected by the land areas and the banks. It appears that the flood is diverted by the chain of islands – Skagul to Unalga – and the relatively shoal water between them to an east and west direction in moving around this chain. It was observed that south of Skagul Island the flood sets about northeast, east of this island it sets north, and north of the island it sets north to northwest.

"With erratic currents of this nature, dead reckoning cannot be depended on and the navigator may find his vessel 1 mile (1.6 km) or more off his reckoning after a run of 1 hour. During observations made 4.5 miles (7.2 km) southwest of Cape Amagalik, the current was rotary, turning clockwise, and followed a definite pattern. A minimum current averaging about 0.8 knot sets north to northeast."
