= Ulak Island =

Island in Alaska, United States

Coordinates: 51°21′54″N 178°56′50″W

Location in Alaska

Ulak Island (Aleut: Yuulax̂) is an island in the Delarof Islands subgroup of the Andreanof Islands in the Aleutian Islands chain of Alaska.

Ulak is roughly 4 miles (6.4 kilometres) northeast of Amatignak Island.

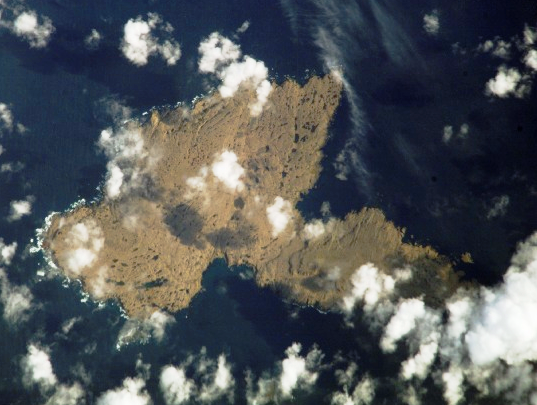
NASA picture of Ulak Island.

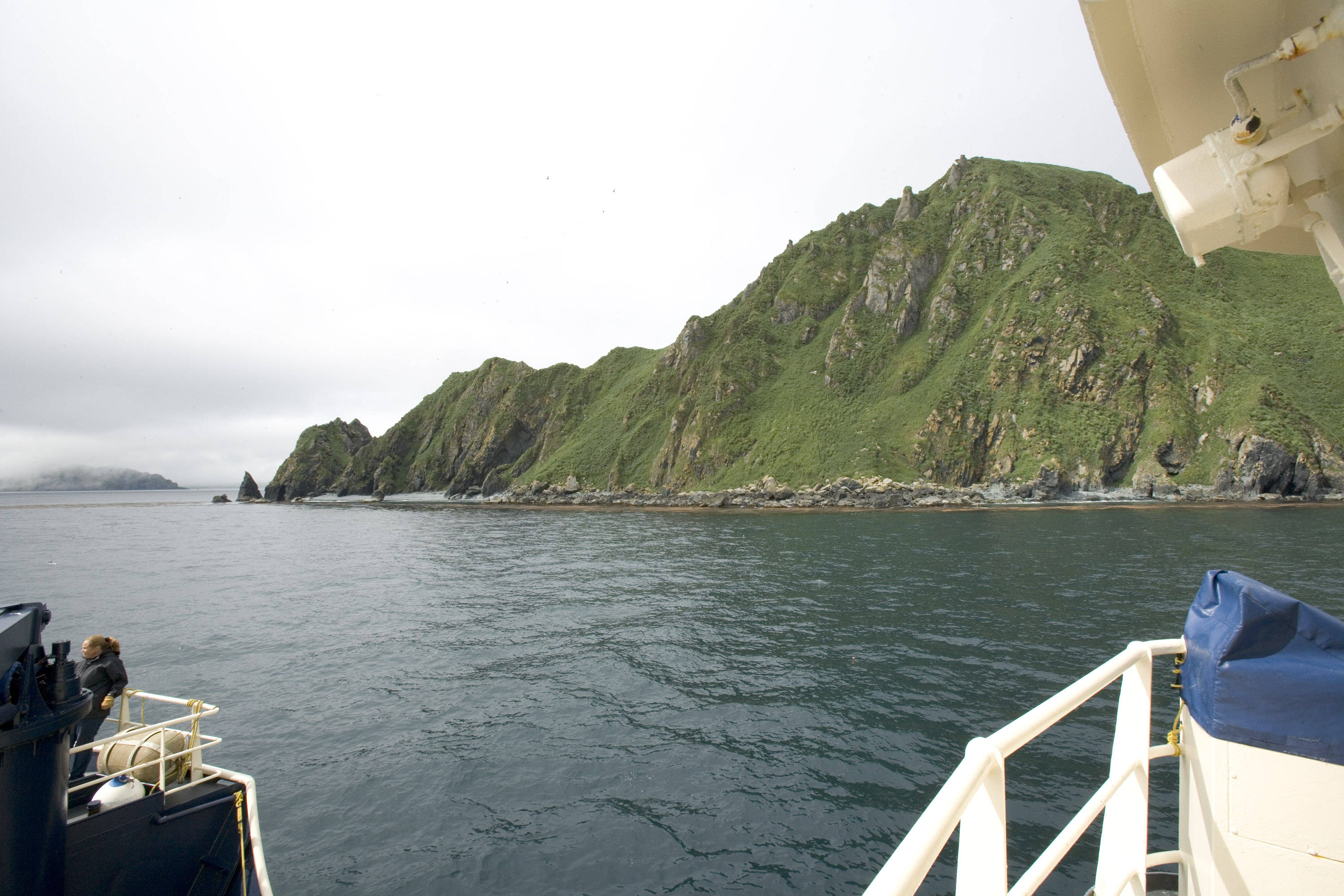
