= Amatignak Island =

Island of Alaska, United States

Coordinates: 51°15′44″N 179°06′31″W

Location in Alaska

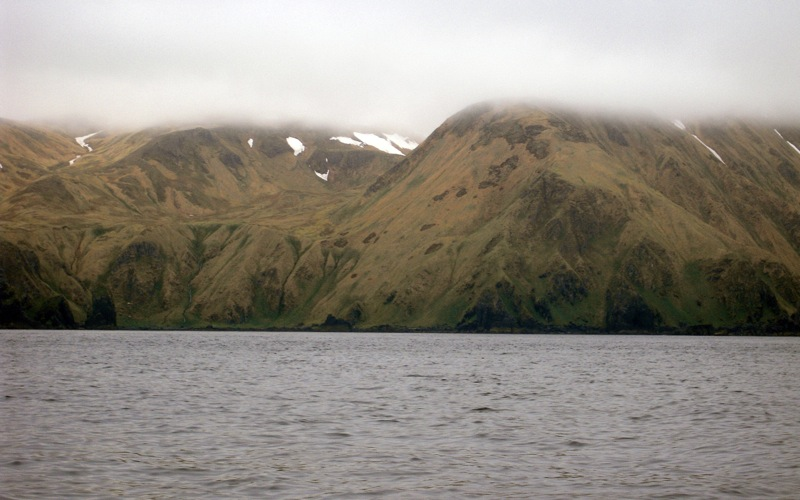
Amatignak coast

Amatignak Island (Aleut: Amatignax̂; Russian: Амактигнак) is a member of the Delarof Islands (western Andreanof Islands), in Alaska's Aleutian archipelago. The southernmost point of Alaska is on this island, as well as the westernmost longitude of Alaska, the United States, and North America.

In 2025, a study revealed the likely explanation behind bear bones discovered on the island, which, like the rest of the Aleutians, had otherwise been thought to be historically bear free. 3500 to 5500 years ago, evidence showed that the local population was hunting bears that had transited to the area over ice.

The island is about 5 miles (8 km) long north-to-south, and about 3 miles (5 km) wide east-to-west. It is uninhabited. The nearest island is Ulak Island about 4 miles (6 km) to the northeast.

On the evening of September 27, 1932, the cargo ship Nevada ran aground on the eastern tip of the island while en route from Astoria, Oregon to Yokohama, Japan. The Japanese steamer Oregon Maru responded to the distress call, followed by American ships the President Madison, the Oregon, and the USCGC Haida. Of the 35 crew members and one passenger aboard at the time of the wreck, only 3 were able to be rescued by the President Madison.
