= Sea Otter Rocks =

Rock islets in the Bering Sea, Russia

Coordinates: 54°52′33″N 167°26′08″E

Sea Otter Rocks (Russian: Камни Бобровые, Kamni Bobrovyye) are rock islets north of Medny Island in the Commander Islands archipelago in the Bering Sea, Russia.

They are within Kamchatka Krai, in the Russian Far East.

== See also ==
- Islands of the Commander Islands
- Islands of the Russian Far East
