= Seguam Island =

Mountain island in Alaska, USA

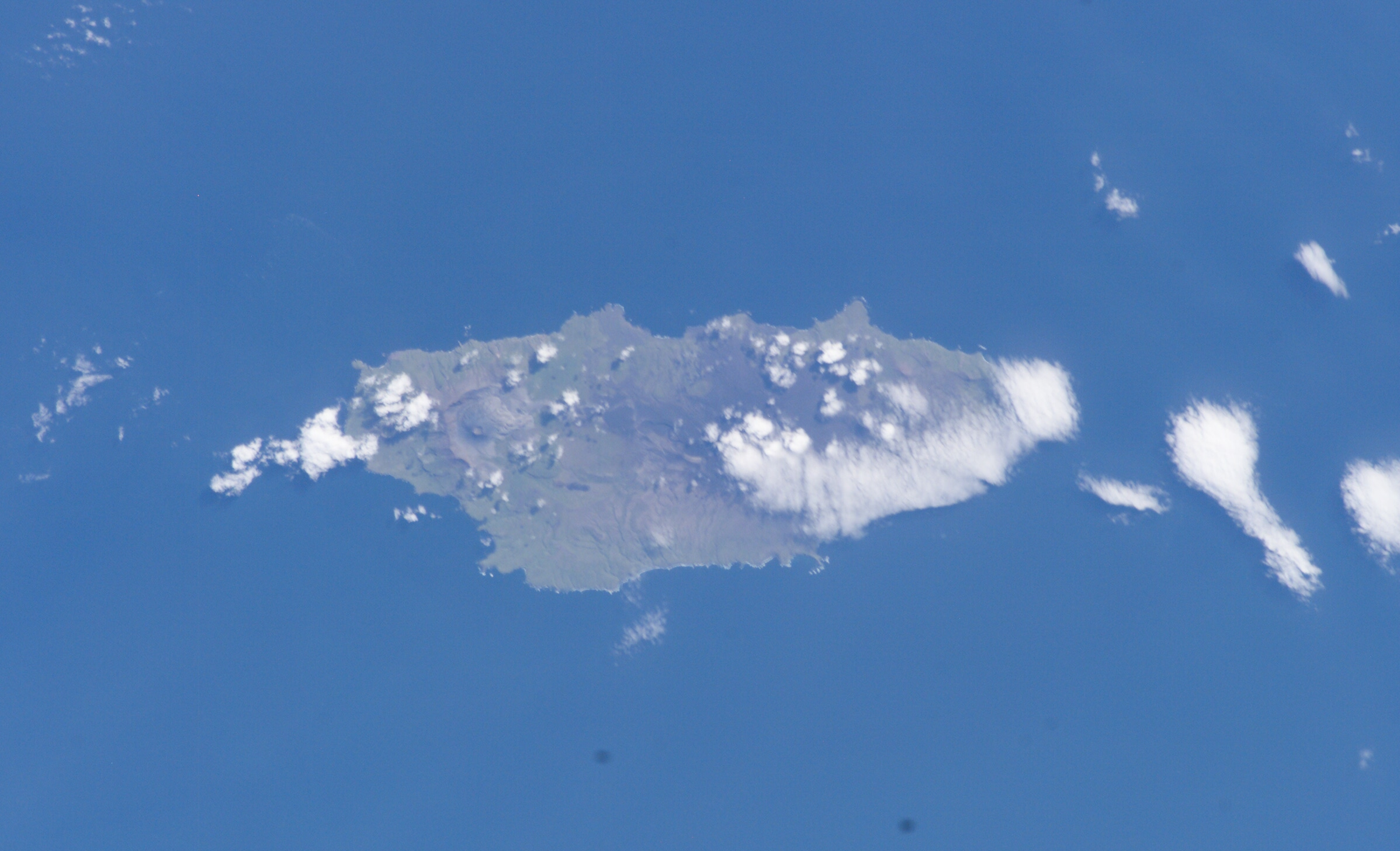

Highest point
- Elevation: 3,458 ft (1,054 m)
- Coordinates: 52°19′24″N 172°27′58″W

Geography
- Location: Aleutian Islands, Alaska, US
- Topo map: USGS Seguam

Geology
- Mountain type: Stratovolcanoes
- Last eruption: May to August 1993

Seguam Island (Aleut: Saĝuugamax; Russian: Остров Сигуам) is a small volcanic island in the Andreanof Islands group in the Aleutian Islands of Alaska. The island is mountainous and oval shaped with a land area of 80.04 square miles (207.3 km^{2}). It is 16 miles (26 km) long and 6.8 miles (10.9 km) wide.

== Population ==
The 2000 census reported a population of one person.

== Geography ==
The island consists of several overlapping stratovolcanoes, and it contains two calderas each with central volcanic cones. On March 6, 1977 USCGC Mellon WHEC 717 spotted a volcanic eruption just a few hours old on Seguam Island in the Aleutian chain. About 10 historical eruptions have been recorded since the late 18th century, the most recent in 1993. On recent activity has occurred at Pyre Peak, the cone within the western caldera and the highest point on the island, and has produced explosive eruptions and basaltic lava flows.
