= Gareloi Island =

Volcanic island in the Delarof Islands, Alaska, U.S.

Coordinates: 51°47′08.6″N 178°47′56″W

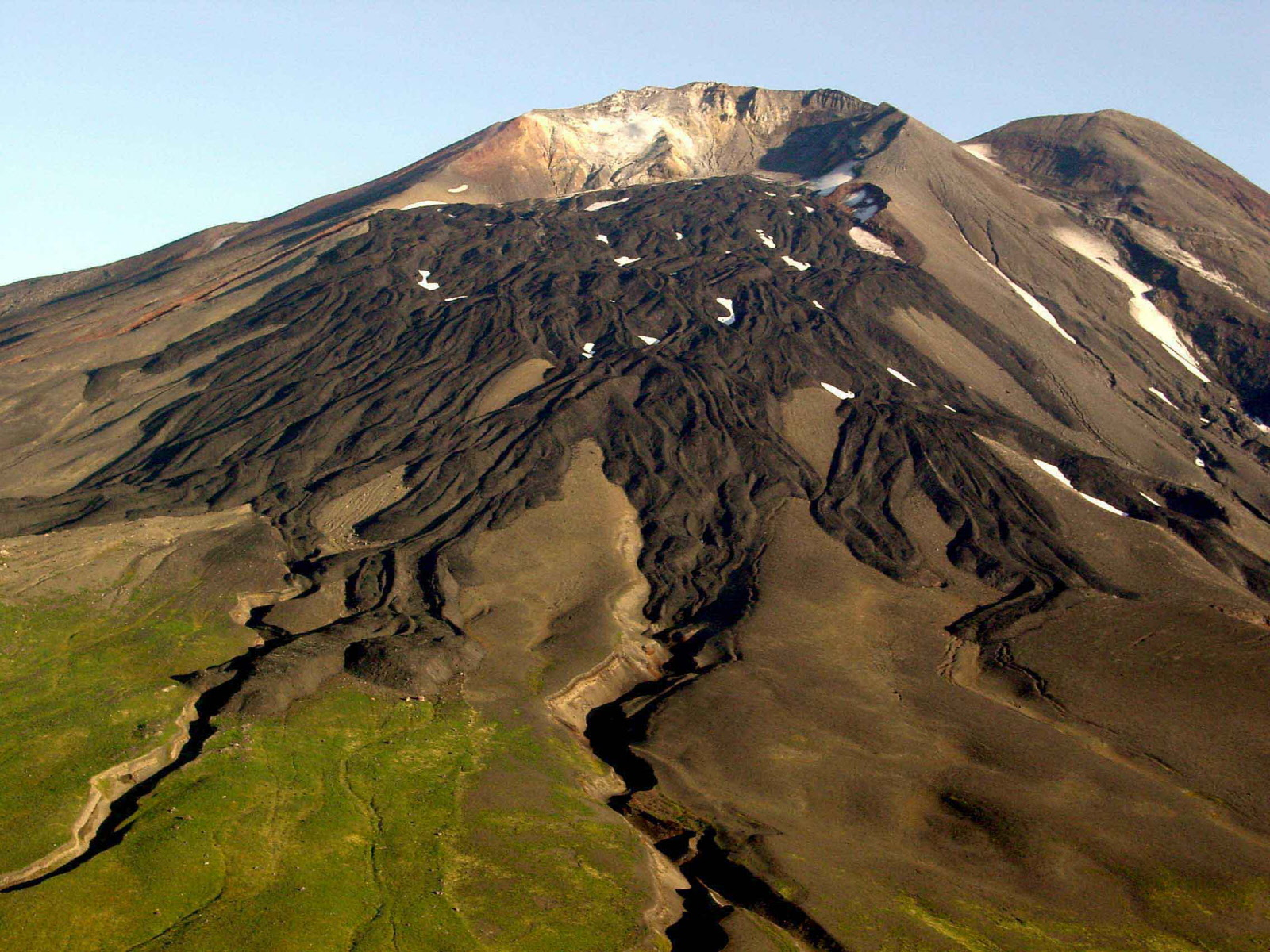
South flank of Gareloi Volcano, April 2003.

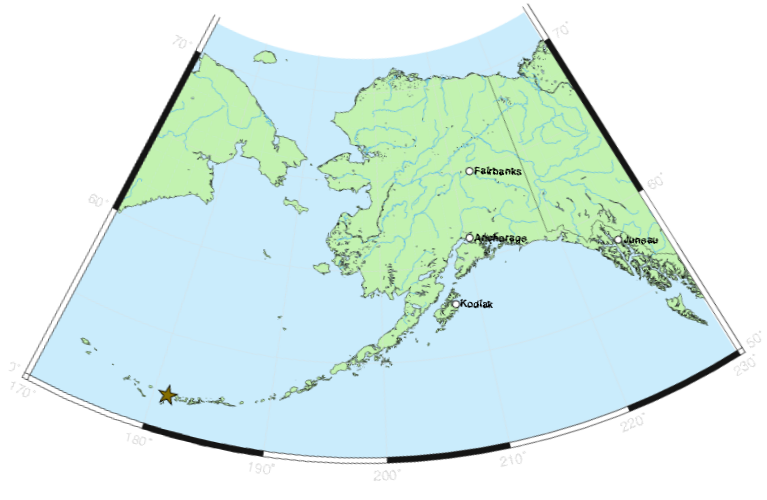
Gareloi's Location in Alaska.

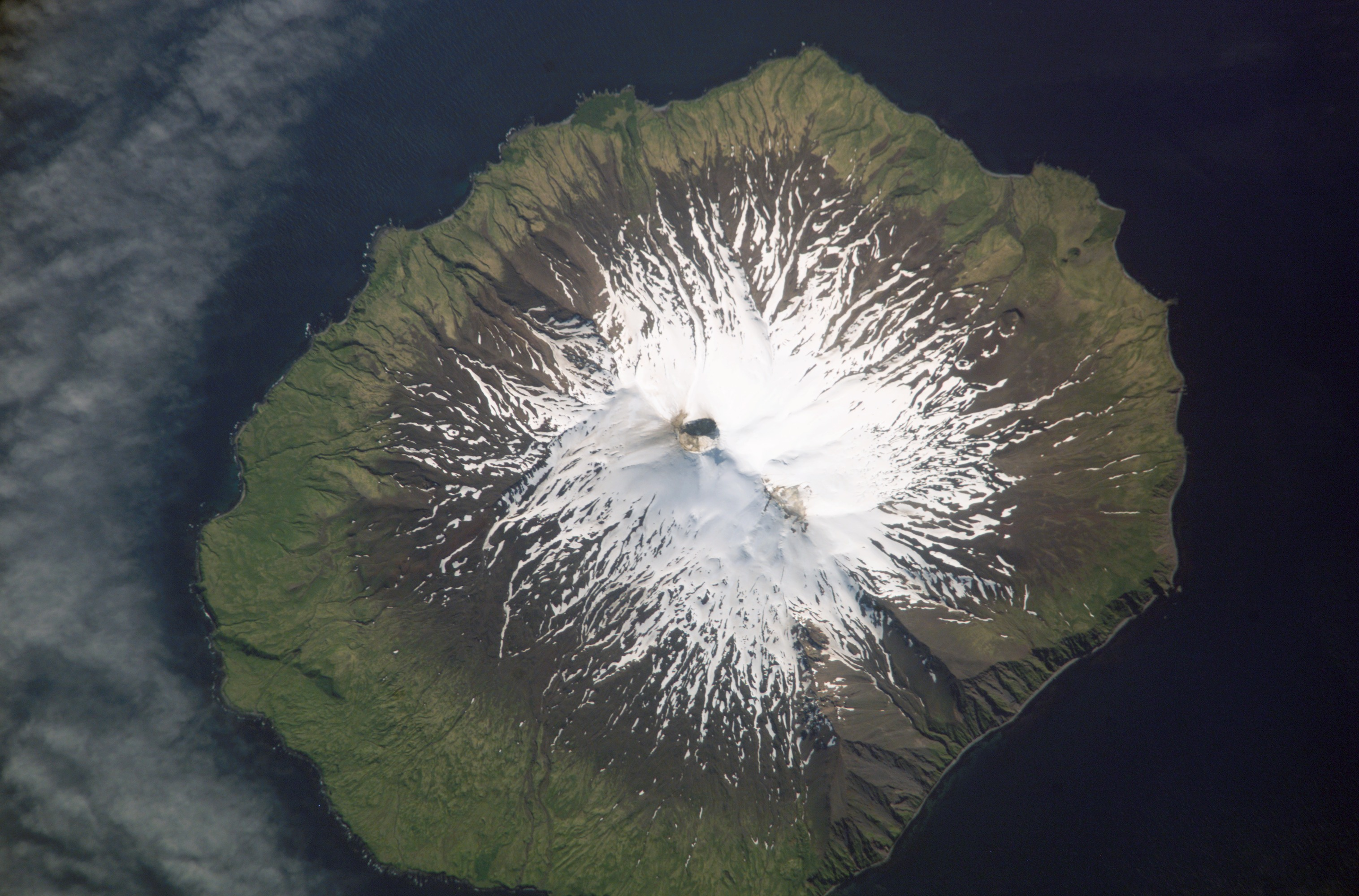
NASA Gareloi Island.

Gareloi (Russian: Горелый) or Anangusook (Aleut: Anangusix̂) is a volcanic island in the Delarof Islands of the Aleutian Islands of Alaska. It is located between the Tanaga Pass and the Amchitka Pass.

The island is 6 miles (9.7 km) in length and 5 miles (8.0 km) wide. Its land area is 25.95 square miles (67.2 km^{2}), making Gareloi the largest island in the Delarof group. Gareloi Volcano, a stratovolcano, is situated in the center of the island which reaches a height of 5,161 feet (1,573 m). On the other side of a small saddle lies another peak of the island however it does not equal the height of Mount Gareloi. The island is uninhabited.

Coastal cliffs provide nesting habitat for more than 600,000 seabirds, mostly for crevice nesting auklets. Least Auklets account for 62% of the colony, Crested Auklets for 30%, and Parakeet Auklets for 6%. Each of these species is present on the island in numbers exceeding 1% of their global populations.

The island consists of lava rock, black lava, eroded lava, and ashes; the lower slopes and valleys are covered with grass and tundra in many places. The shores have steep cliffs with rocks and boulders at the base; boulders, pinnacles, and rocks awash extend around the shoreline. Heavy kelp surrounds most of the island, and extends offshore to 10 fathoms (18 m). Depths of 10 fathoms or more are within 0.5 miles (800 m) of the island. A trapper's hut is on the beach above the N shore of Gareloi Island.

Gareloi's northern, slightly higher peak is on the southern rim of a crater about 330 yards (300 m) across, which contains several active fumaroles. Thirteen younger craters, from 87 yards (80 m) to 1 mile (1,600 m) in diameter, are aligned along a south-southeast trending fissure that extends from strandline to the southern summit. These craters formed during a major explosive eruption in 1929 that also produced four blocky lava flows, and a blanket of grassy andesitic tuff that covers an area roughly 1.5 by 3 miles (2.4 by 4.8 km) on the volcano's southeast flank.

Gareloi Volcano had four confirmed eruptions in the 1980s and one unconfirmed eruption in 1996. All but one of them were considered explosive eruptions. In Spring and Summer 2007 there was a period of increased seismic activity on Gareloi Island, sometimes reaching 40 earthquakes per day.
