= Andreanof Islands =

Group of islands in Alaska, United States

Coordinates: 51°52′22″N 176°11′44″W

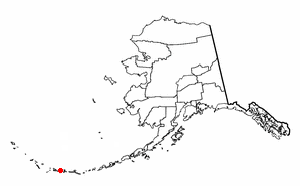
Location of the Andreanof Islands in the Aleutian Islands archipelago, Alaska

The Andreanof Islands (Aleut: Niiĝuĝim tanangis, Russian: Андреяновские острова) are a group of islands that are located in the Aleutian Island chain in southwestern Alaska, United States. They are located at about 52° North and 172°57' to 179°09' West.

== Geography ==
The Andreanof Islands are located between the Amchitka Pass and the Rat Islands group to the west, and Amukta Pass and the Islands of Four Mountains group to the east. The islands extend about 275 miles (440 km). The total land area of all islands (including the Delarof Islands) is 1,515.349 sq mi (3,924.737 km^{2}).

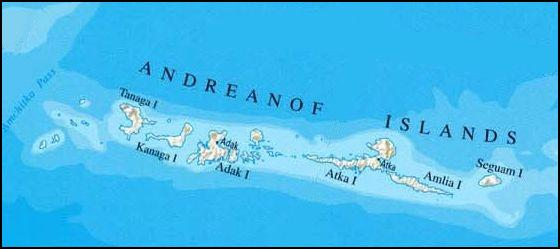
Map of the Andreanof Islands.

=== Islands ===
The Delarof Islands are a subgroup of the Andreanof Islands group. They are the westernmost islands in the group. The largest islands in the group are, from west to east, Gareloi Island, Tanaga Island, Kanaga, Adak Island, Kagalaska Island, Great Sitkin Island, Atka Island, Amlia, and Seguam Island.

The islands are usually foggy and treeless due to the constant wind present on the islands.

== History ==
The Andreanof Islands were named after the Russian navigator, Andreyan (Hadrian) Tolstykh, who was the first European to explore the islands in 1761.

There were several United States military bases on the islands during the Second World War. These islands were strategically important being used as a staging point to take back the islands of Attu and Kiska which were held by the Japanese Empire. The bases on Adak were enlarged and made permanent after the war but were closed in 1995.

On the 9th of March 1957, these islands experienced one of the largest earthquakes in the 20th century now known as the 1957 Andreanof Islands earthquake. It had a magnitude of 8.6 and generated tsunamis that affected the entire Pacific Ocean. It destroyed houses and two bridges leaving behind a 4.5 meter crack in the road. The earthquake was large enough that it affected other islands, including the destruction of a dock on Umnak Island.

== Demographics ==
The total population was 412 persons as of the 2000 census, the vast majority in the city of Adak on Adak Island.

== See also ==
- 1957 Andreanof Islands earthquake
