= Aleutian Islands =

Chain of islands in the Pacific Ocean

Aleutian Islands Алеутские острова (Russian)
Native name: Unangam Tanangin
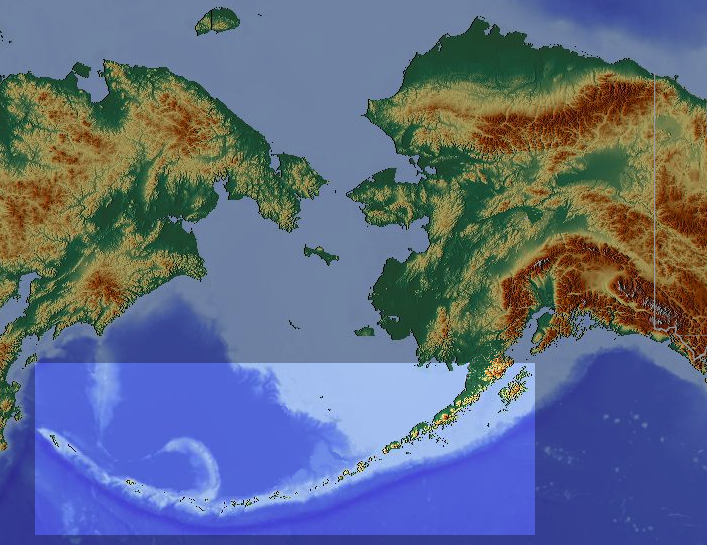
- Aleutian Islands highlighted

- Location in the northern Pacific Ocean

Geography
- Location: North Pacific Ocean, Bering Sea
- Coordinates: 52.2°N 174.2°W
- Total islands: >300
- Major islands: Unimak Island, Unalaska Island, Adak Island
- Area: 6,821 sq mi (17,670 km^{2})
- Length: 1,200 mi (1900 km)
- Highest elevation: 9,373 ft (2856.9 m)
- Highest point: Mount Shishaldin, Unimak Is.

Administration
- United States
- State: Alaska
- Largest settlement: Unalaska (pop. 4,254)
- Russia
- Federal subject: Kamchatka Krai
- District: Aleutsky District

Demographics
- Population: 7,152 (2020)
- Pop. density: 0.84/sq mi (0.324/km^{2})
- Languages: Aleutian, English, Russian
- Ethnic groups: Aleuts, Americans, Russians

Additional information
- Time zones: Hawaii–Aleutian Time Zone (UTC−10); Alaska Time Zone (UTC−9)
  - Summer (DST): Hawaii–Aleutian Daylight Time (UTC−9); Alaska Daylight Time (UTC−8)

- Person: Unangax̂
- People: Unangan (east); Unangas (west)
- Language: Unangam Tunuu
- Country: Unangam Tanangin

The Aleutian Islands (Note: Russian: Алеутские острова, romanized: Aleutskiye ostrova; Aleut: Unangam Tanangin, lit. 'land of the Aleuts'; possibly from the Chukchi aliat, or 'island'.) (/əˈluːʃən/ ə-LOO-shən or /əˈljuːʃən/ ə-LEW-shən), also called the Aleut Islands, or Aleutic Islands, are a chain of 14 main, larger volcanic islands and 55 smaller ones.

Most of the islands belong to the U.S. state of Alaska, with the archipelago encompassing the Aleutians West Census Area and the Aleutians East Borough. The Commander Islands, located farther to the west, belong to the Russian federal subject of Kamchatka Krai, of the Russian Far East.

The islands form part of the Aleutian Arc of the Northern Pacific Ocean, and occupy a land area of 6,821 sq mi (17,666 km^{2}) that extends westward roughly 1,200 mi (1,900 km) from the Alaska Peninsula mainland, in the direction of the Kamchatka Peninsula; the archipelago acts as a border between the Bering Sea to the north and the Pacific Ocean to the south. Crossing longitude 180°, at which point east and west longitude end, the archipelago contains both the westernmost and easternmost parts of the United States, by longitude (Amatignak Island and Semisopochnoi Island, respectively). The westernmost U.S. island, in real terms, however, is Attu Island, west of which runs the International Date Line.

The islands, with their 57 volcanoes, form the northernmost part of the Pacific Ring of Fire. Physiographically, they are a distinct section of the larger Pacific Border province, which, in turn, is part of the larger Pacific Mountain System physiographic division. The islands are considered to be among the most geographically isolated areas of the Northern Pacific.

Battles and skirmishes took place during the Aleutian Islands campaign of World War II. The Japanese landing and occupations of Kiska and Attu, in June 1942, were the only invasions of the United States in North America during WWII; the Philippines, Guam and Wake Atoll, Pacific territories of the United States, were also invaded.

== Geology ==
Motion between the Kula Plate and the North American Plate along the margin of the Bering Shelf (in the Bering Sea north of the Aleutian arc) ended in the early Eocene. The Aleutian Basin, the ocean floor north of the Aleutian arc, is the remainder of the Kula Plate that was trapped when volcanism and subduction jumped south to its current location at c. 56 Ma. The Aleutian island arc formed in the Early Eocene (55–50 Ma) when the subduction of the Pacific Plate under the North American Plate began. The arc is made of separate blocks that have been rotated clockwise. The basement underlying the islands is made of three stratigraphic units: an Eocene layer of volcanic rock, an Oligocene–Miocene layer of marine sedimentary rock, and a Pliocene–Quaternary layer of sedimentary and igneous rock.

== Geography ==
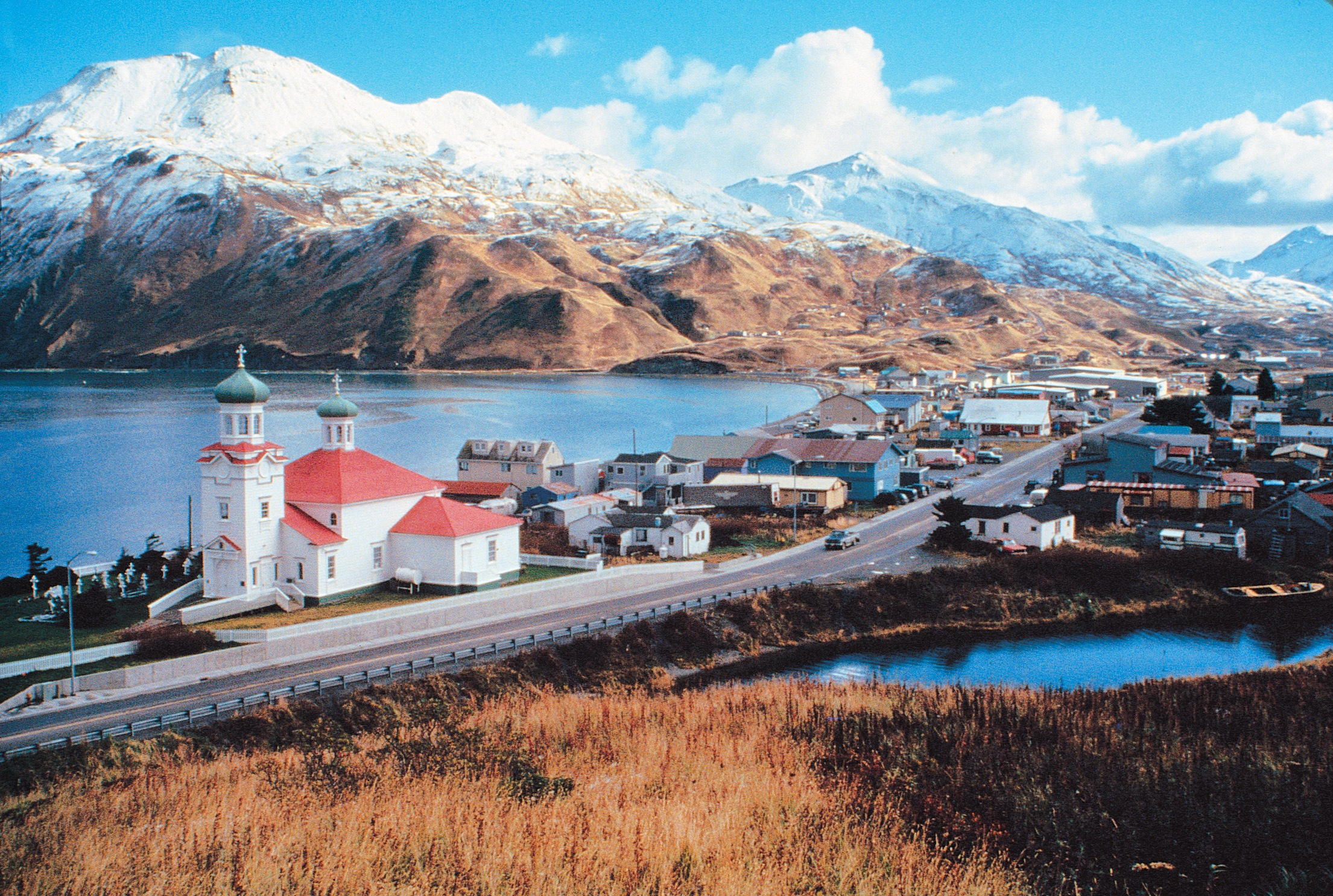
Unalaska Island in the Aleutian Islands

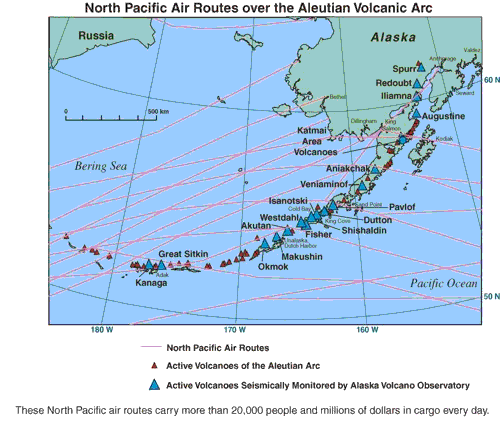
Active Aleutian volcanoes

The islands, known before 1867 as the Catherine Archipelago, include six groups (east to west)

- Fox Islands (the main islands are Unimak, Akutan, Unalaska and Umnak)
- Islands of Four Mountains (the main islands are Yunaska and Chuginadak)
- Andreanof Islands (the main islands are Adak, Atka, Amlia, Seguam, Kanaga and Tanaga)
- Rat Islands (the main islands are Kiska and Amchitka)
- Near Islands (the main islands are Attu Island, Agattu Island and the Semichi Islands - Alaid, Nizki and Shemya)
- Commander Islands (the main islands are Bering and Medny)

All six are located between 51° and 55° N latitude and 172° E and 163° W longitude. The largest islands in the Aleutians are Attu, and Unalaska, Umnak, and Unimak in the Fox Islands. The largest of those is Unimak Island, with an area of 1,571.41 mi^{2} (4,069.9 km^{2}), followed by Unalaska Island, the only other Aleutian Island with an area over 1,000 square miles (2,600 km^{2}).

The axis of the archipelago near the mainland of Alaska has a southwest trend, but at Tanaga Island (about 178° W) its direction changes to the northwest. This change of direction corresponds to a curve in the line of volcanic fissures that have contributed their products to the building of the islands. Such curved chains are repeated about the Pacific Ocean in the Kuril Islands, the Japanese chain, and in the Philippines. All these island arcs are at the edge of the Pacific Plate and experience much seismic activity, but are still habitable; the Aleutians lie between the Pacific and North American tectonic plates. The general elevation is greatest in the eastern islands and least in the western. The island chain is a western continuation of the Aleutian Range on the mainland.

The great majority of the islands bear evident marks of volcanic origin, and there are numerous volcanic cones on the north side of the chain, some of them active; many of the islands, however, are not wholly volcanic, but contain crystalline or sedimentary rocks, and also amber and beds of lignite. The coasts are rocky and surf-worn, and the approaches are exceedingly dangerous, the land rising immediately from the coasts to steep, bold mountains.

These volcanic islands reach heights of 6,200 feet (1,900 m). Makushin Volcano (5,691 feet (1,735 m)) on Unalaska Island, is not quite visible from within the town of Unalaska, though the steam rising from its cone is visible on a (rare) clear day. Residents of Unalaska need only to climb one of the smaller hills in the area, such as Pyramid Peak or Mt. Newhall, to get a good look at the snow-covered cone. The volcanic Bogoslof and Fire Islands, which rose from the sea in 1796 and 1883 respectively, lie about 30 miles (50 km) west of Unalaska Bay.

In 1906, a new volcanic cone rose between the islets of Bogoslof and Grewingk, near Unalaska, followed by another in 1907. These cones were nearly demolished by an explosive eruption on September 1, 1907. In 2017, the volcanic cone erupted sending ash and ice particles 30,000 feet (9000 m) into the air.

Alfred Russel Wallace's 1879 book Australasia, Ian Todd's 1974 book Island Realm: A Pacific Panorama and Dean Kohlhoff's 2002 book Amchitka and the Bomb: Nuclear Testing in Alaska all associate the Aleutian Islands with the Oceania region due to their status as remote islands in the Pacific. The islands, having biogeographical and ethnocultural affinities to North America, are not ordinarily considered a part of the region.

The Aleutians seen from space

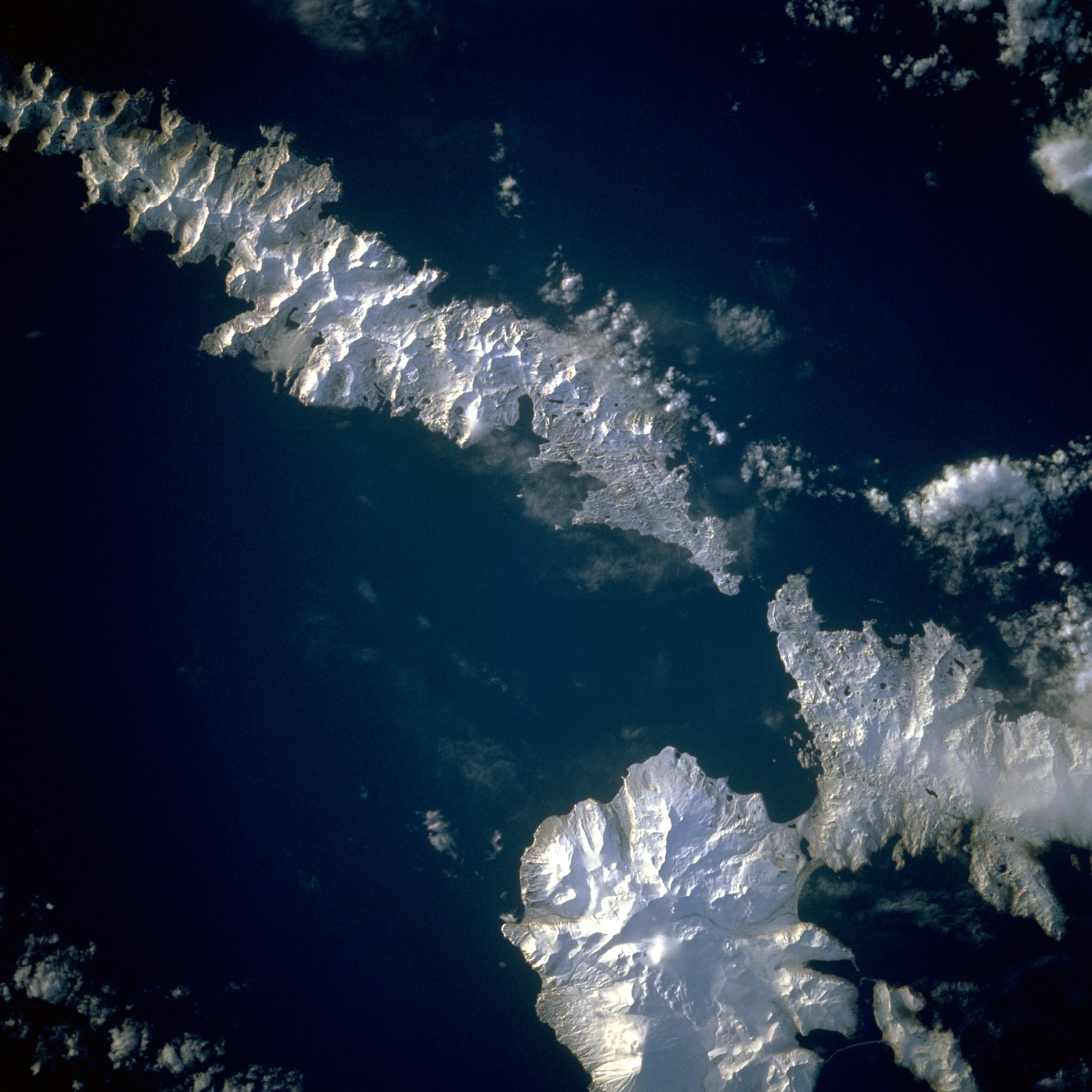
Image of the islands taken by the STS-56 crew. Amlia Island is visible in the upper left of the photo, while the eastern half of Atka Island is shown at the right. North is to the bottom left in this photo.

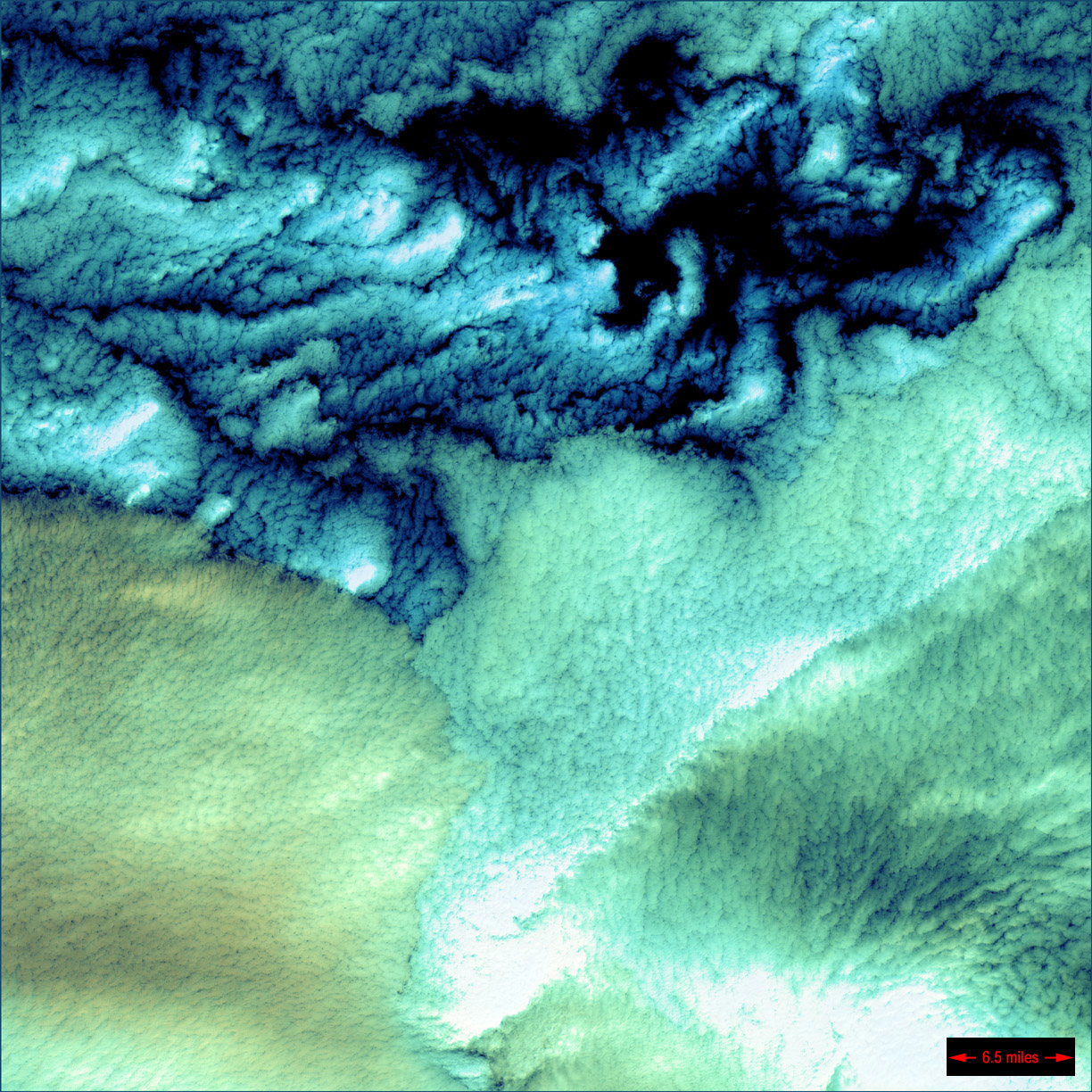
These cloud formations were seen over the western Aleutian Islands.

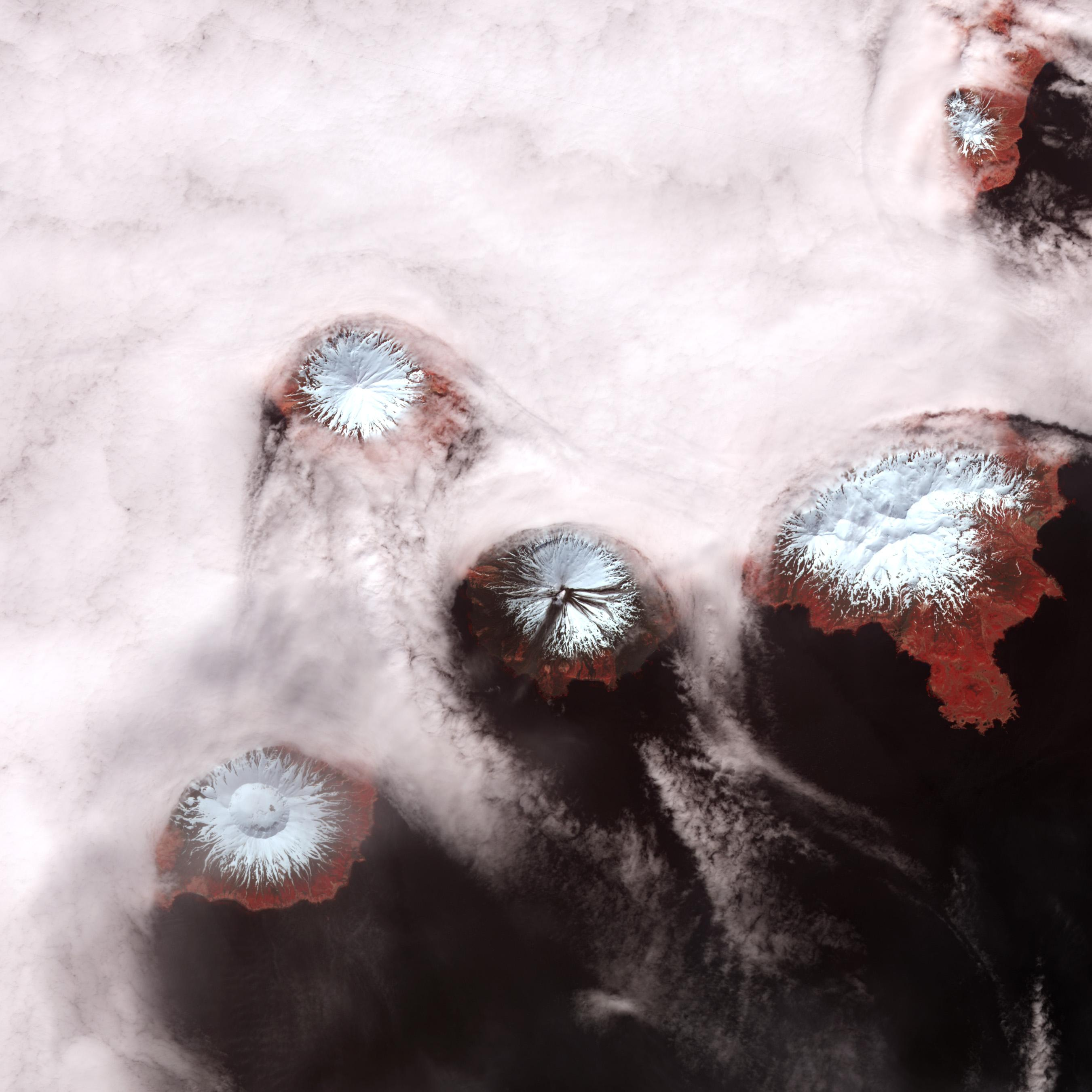
ASTER image of the islands

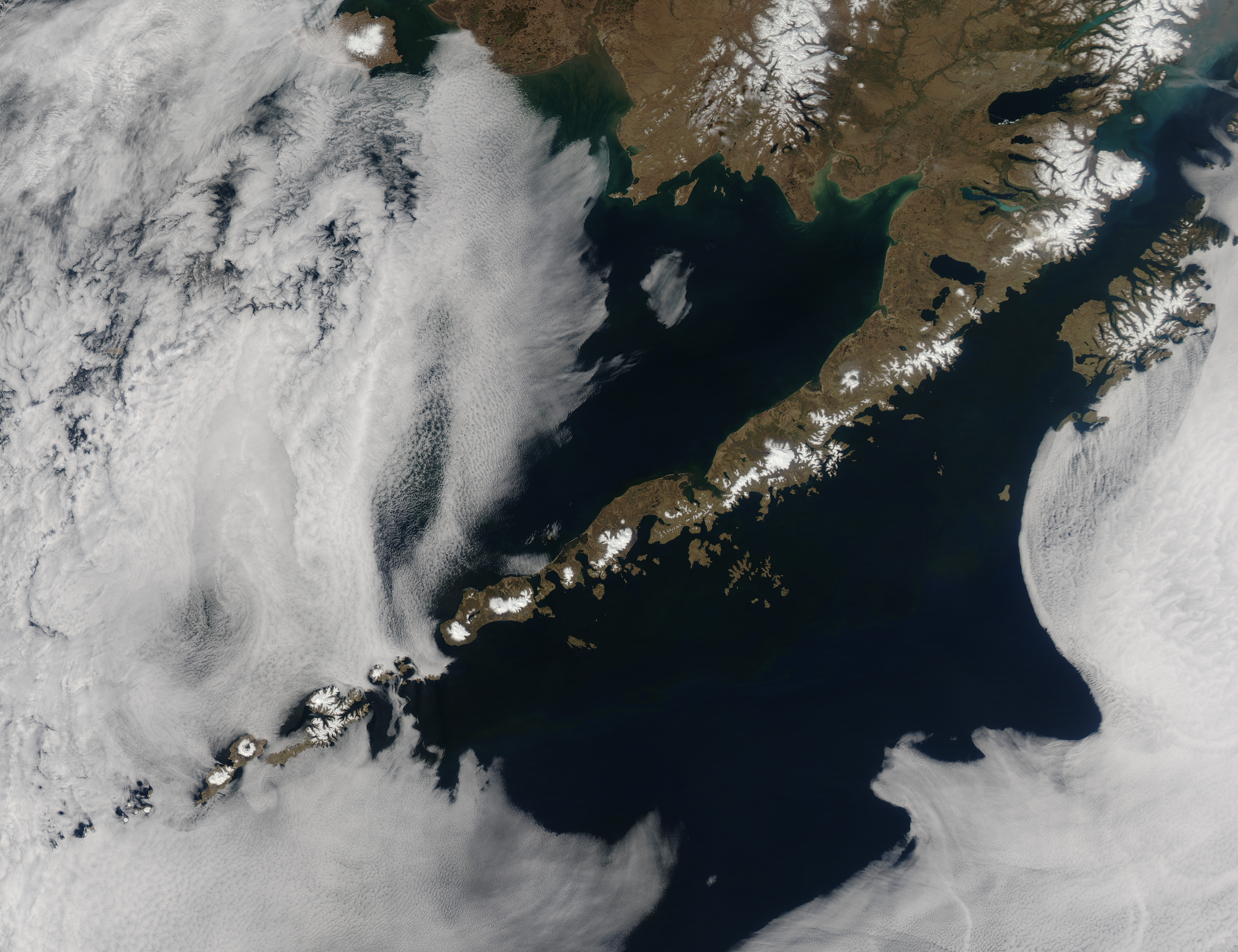
Aleutian Islands on May 15, 2014, by NASA's Aqua satellite

== Climate ==
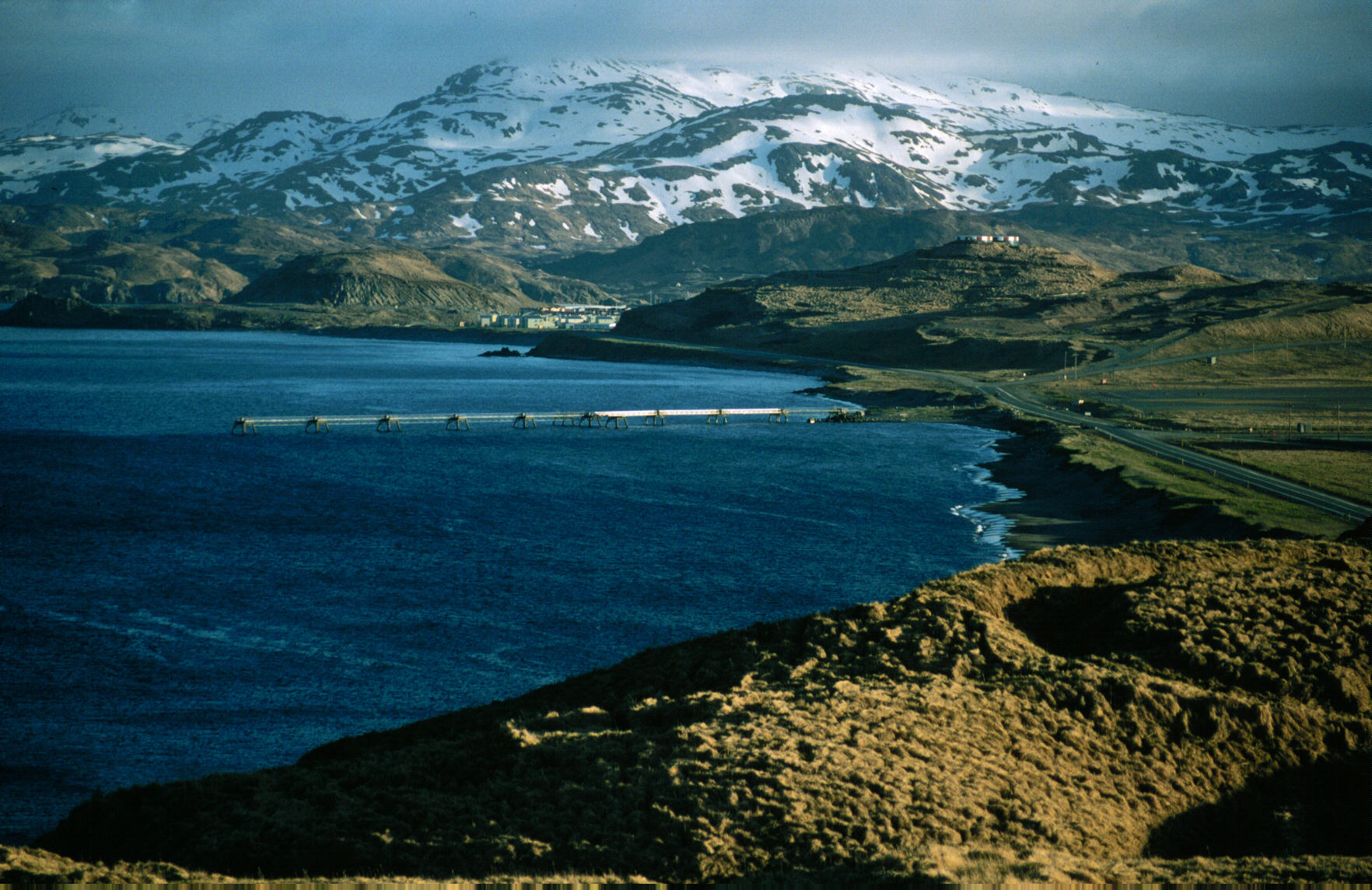
Adak Island's climate creates a tundra.

The climate of the islands is oceanic, with moderate and fairly uniform temperatures and heavy rainfall. Fogs are almost constant. Summer weather is much cooler than Southeast Alaska (around Sitka), but the winter temperature of the islands and of the Alaska Panhandle is nearly the same. According to the Köppen climate classification system, the area southwest of 53.5°N 167.0°W, on Unalaska Island, has a "Subpolar Oceanic Climate" (type "Cfc", as does Reykjavík, Tórshavn, Punta Arenas, Ushuaia and the Auckland Islands), characterized by the coldest month averaging above 0 °C (32 °F), one to three months averaging above 10 °C (50 °F), and no significant precipitation differences between seasons. To the northeast of that point, the climate becomes "Subarctic With Cool Summers And Year Around Rainfall" (type "Dfc", like Petropavlovsk-Kamchatsky, Murmansk, St. Moritz, and Labrador City), where it is similar albeit colder, with the coldest month averaging below 0 °C (32 °F). During the winter, the islands become the center of a semi-permanent low-pressure area called the Aleutian Low.

The mean annual temperature for Unalaska, the most populated island of the group, is about 38 °F (3 °C), being about 30 °F (−1 °C) in January and about 52 °F (11 °C) in August. The highest and lowest temperatures recorded on the islands were 78 °F (26 °C) and 5 °F (−15 °C), respectively. The average amount of annual rainfall is about 80 inches (2,000 mm); Unalaska, with about 250 rainy days per year, is said to be one of the rainiest places within the U.S.

== Flora ==
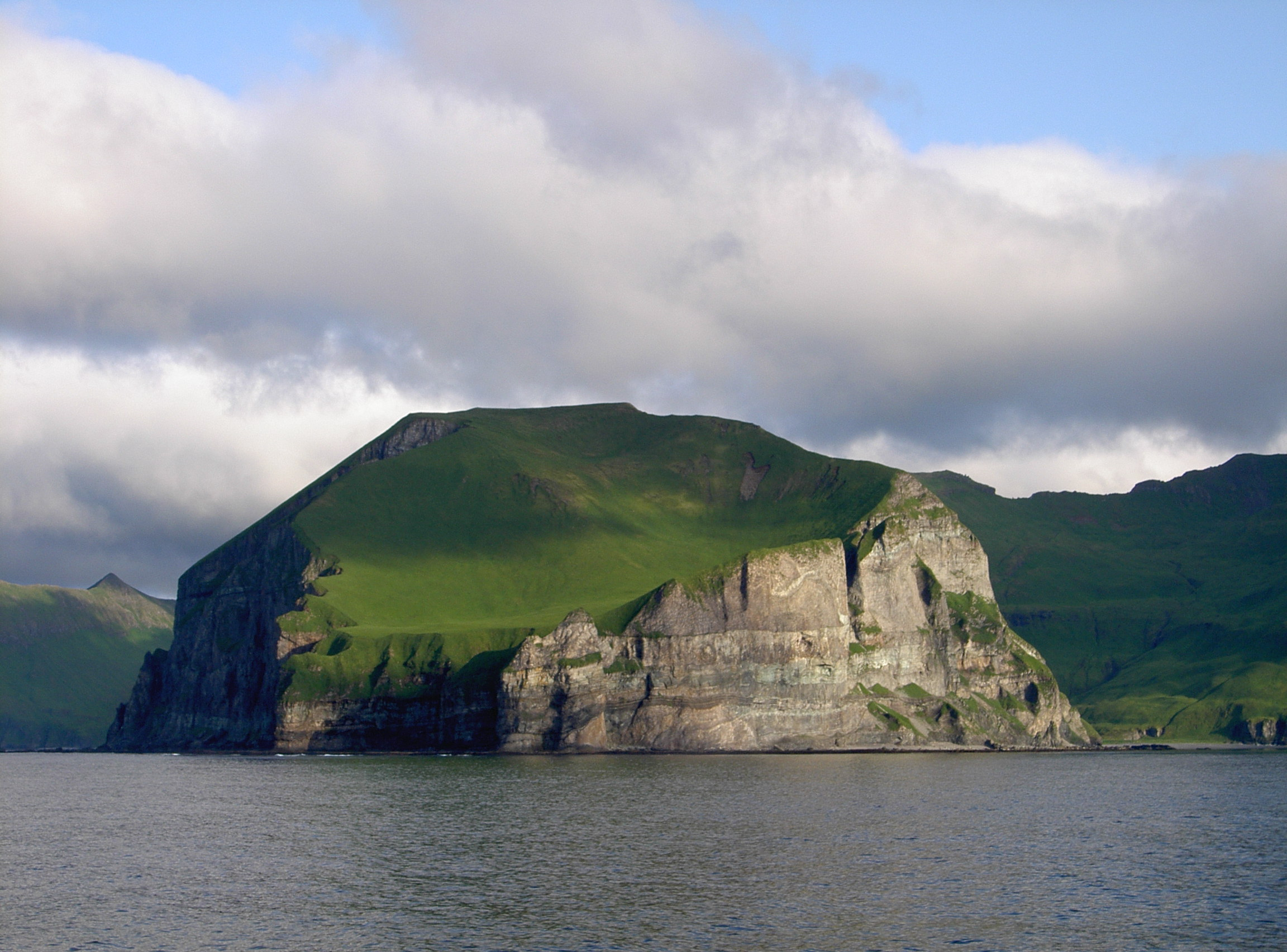
Cape Promontory, Cape Lutkes on Unimak Island in the Aleutian Islands, Alaska

The growing season lasts approximately 135 days, from early in May until late in September, but agriculture is limited to the raising of few vegetables. With the exception of some stunted willows, the vast majority of the chain is devoid of native trees. On some of the islands, such as Adak and Amaknak, there are a few coniferous trees growing, remnants of the Russian period. While tall trees grow in many cold climates, Aleutian conifers — some estimated to be two hundred years old — rarely reach a height of even 10 feet (3 m), and many of them are still less than 5 feet (1.5 m) tall. This is because the islands, much like the Falklands and other islands of similar latitudes, experience such strong winds that taller trees are vulnerable to snapping off.

Instead of trees, the islands are covered with a luxuriant, dense growth of herbage and shrubs, including crowberry, bluejoint, grasses, sedges, and many flowering plants. There are areas of peat bog near the coasts. Endemic plants include the endangered Aleutian shield fern.

There is currently almost no naturally occurring forest in the Aleutian Islands, except with the help of human intervention. For example, the “Adak National Forest” on Adak Island is a man-made tree group consisting of 33 trees.

== Fauna ==
Transient orcas near Unimak Island, eastern Aleutian Islands

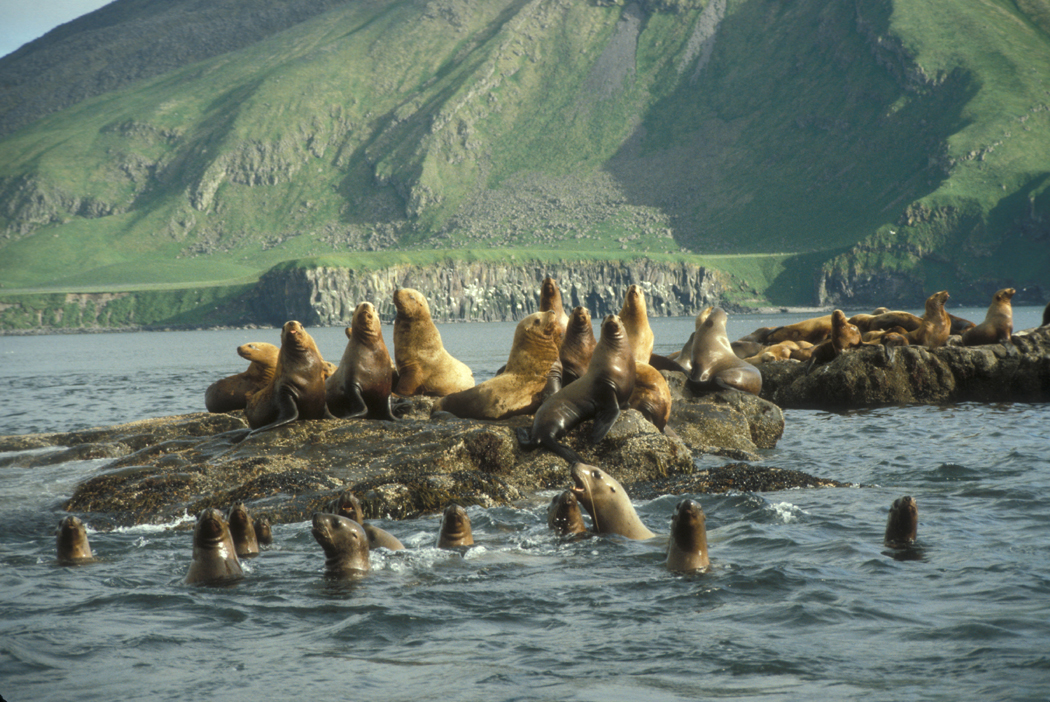
Steller sea lions haul out on Amak Island.

The Aleutians are home to many large colonies of seabirds. Buldir Island has 21 breeding seabird species, including the Bering Sea-endemic red-legged kittiwake. Large seabird colonies are also present at Kiska, Gareloi, Semisopochnoi, Bogoslof, and others. The islands are also frequented by vagrant Asiatic birds, including the common rosefinch, Siberian rubythroat, bluethroat, lanceolated warbler, and the first North American record of the intermediate egret.

The habitats of the Aleutians are largely unspoiled, but wildlife is affected by competition from introduced species such as cattle, caribou, and foxes. Nearly all of the Aleutians are protected as part of the Alaska Maritime National Wildlife Refuge and the Aleutian Islands Wilderness.

Observations have identified sea otters as a keystone species along the coasts of many of the Aleutian Islands. Their presence encourages the growth of kelp forests, as the otters control sea urchin populations (as large populations of sea urchins can create urchin barrens by clearing away kelp stands).

== Demographics ==
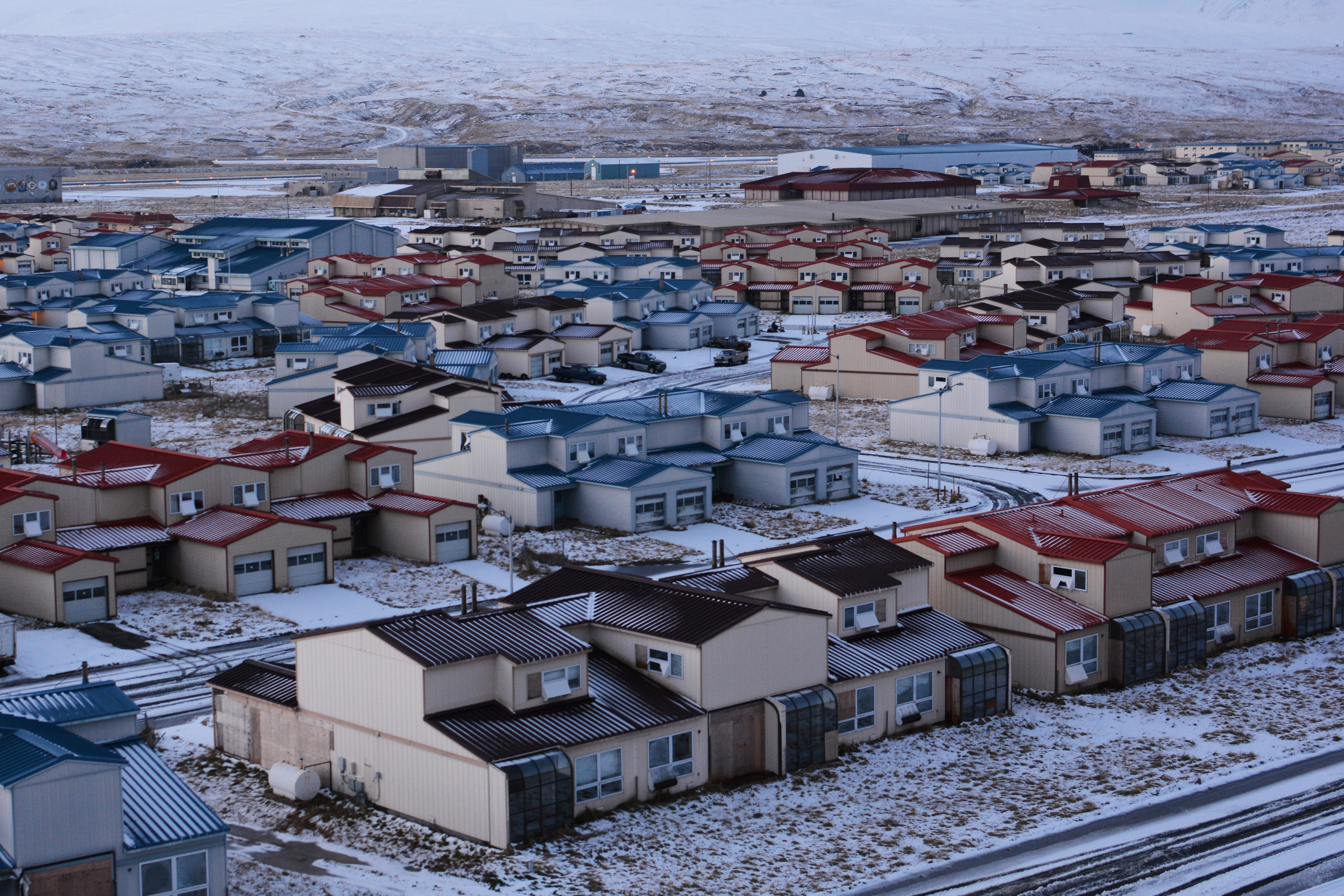
Residences in Adak, Adak Island

The native people refer to themselves as Unangan, and are now generally known by most non-natives as the Aleut. The Aleut language is one of the two main branches of the Eskimo–Aleut language family. This family is not known to be related to any others. The 2020 U.S. census recorded a population of 7,152 on the islands, of whom 4,254 were living in the main settlement of Unalaska.

Historical populations
| Year | Pop. | ±% |
|---|---|---|
| 2000 | 8,162 | — |
| 2020 | 7,152 | −12.4% |

== Economy ==
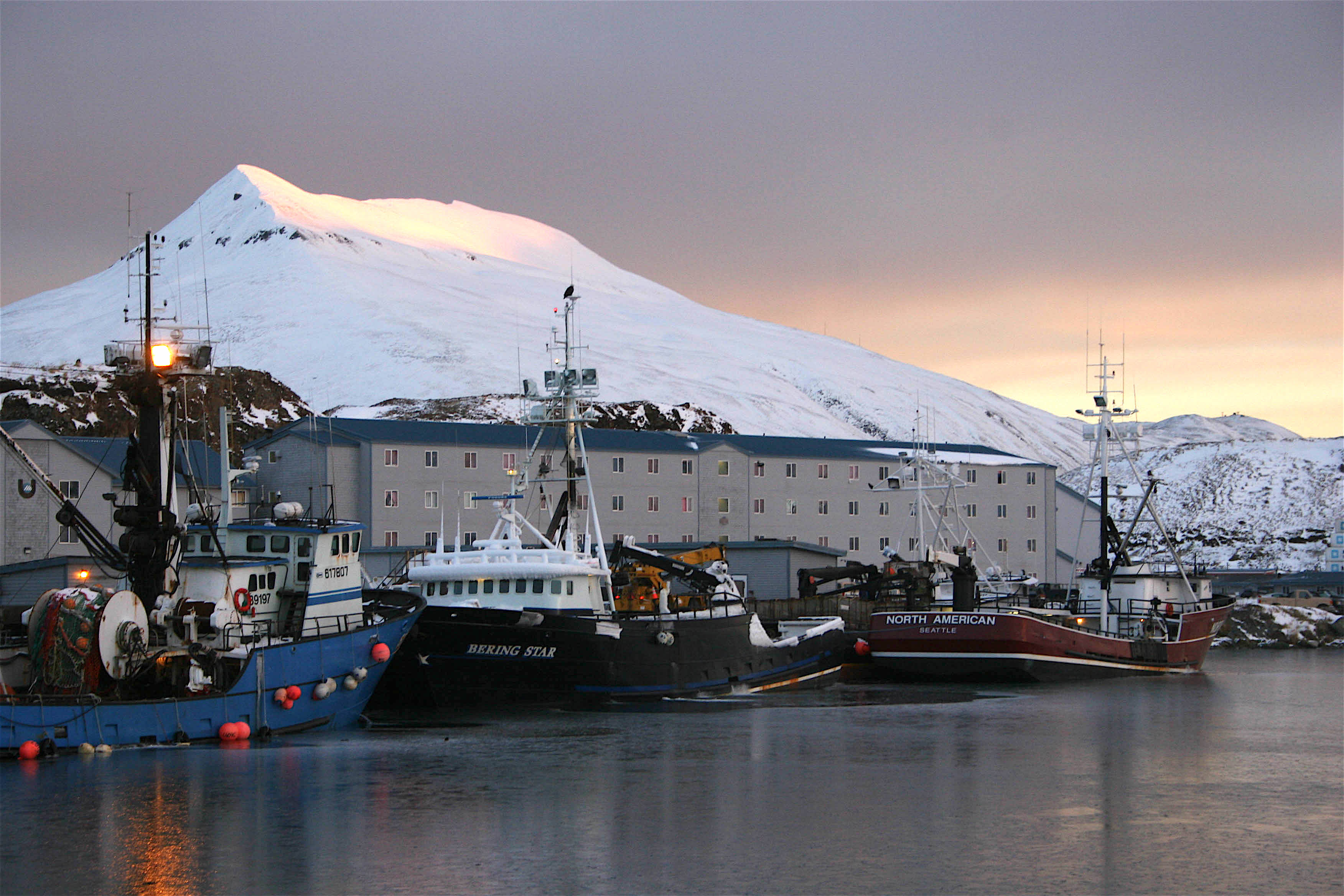
Dutch harbor crab boats

On the less mountainous islands, the raising of sheep and reindeer was once believed to be practicable. There are bison on islands near Sand Point. Sheep raising seems to have died off with the advent of synthetic fibers, which lowered the value of wool. During the 1980s, there were some llama being raised on Unalaska. The current economy is primarily based on fishing, and the presence of U.S. military. The only crop is potato. Chickens are raised in barns under protection from the cold.

== Transportation ==
In addition to a partial air service and a ferry service, the Alaska Marine Highway passes through many of the U.S. islands.

== History ==
=== Prehistory ===
The first Aleutian occupants are thought to have arrived following Beringian migrations. Where the mainland of Alaska is thought to have been occupied before 15,000 years before present, the Aleutians were likely first occupied approximately 9,000 before present with the earliest archaeological sites found dating to that period, there is a possibility of an earlier occupation as early as 14,000 years ago as melting glaciers exposed the western shorelines of the Alaska Peninsula. The migration of the early Unangax̂ across the island chain would take thousands of years, beginning with the eastern islands, sites on Unalaska have been found which date to 9000 years before present. In the central islands, sites on Adak Island begin appearing approximately 6000 years before present. The western islands were the last settled, with sites beginning to appear 2,500 years before present. Within longest archaeological record in the Eastern Aleutians; the archaeological periods noted by archeologists Knecht and Davis are broken into Anangula phase (9000-7000 BP), Late Anangula (7000-4000 BP), the Margaret Bay Phase (4000-3000 BP), Amaknak Phase (3000-1000 BP), and the Late Aleutian Phase (1000-200 BP). The final three phases have also been noted as the Aleutian tradition.

People living in the Aleutian Islands developed rich culture intimately tied to marine resources. They developed technologies for boat building, allowing for extensive travel and trade, as well as, elaborate tools utilizing lithics, drift wood, and animal resources for fishing and the hunting of sea mammals. Aleutian craftsmanship in basketry and weaving using rye beach grass is also particularly noted.

=== Russian period ===
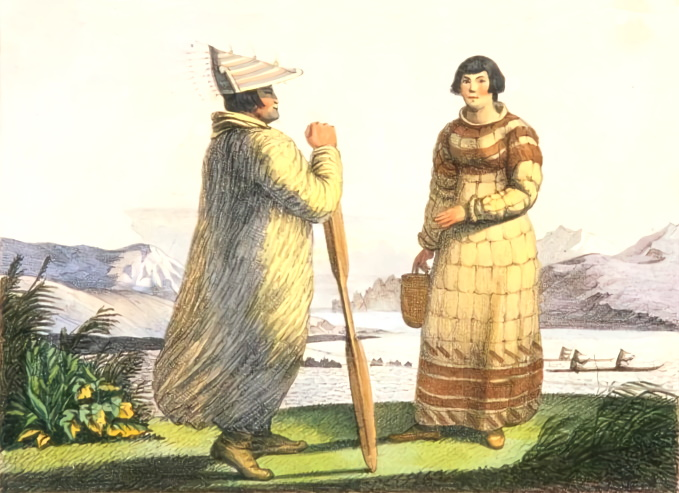
An Aleutian man with a Creole woman in the Aleutian Islands

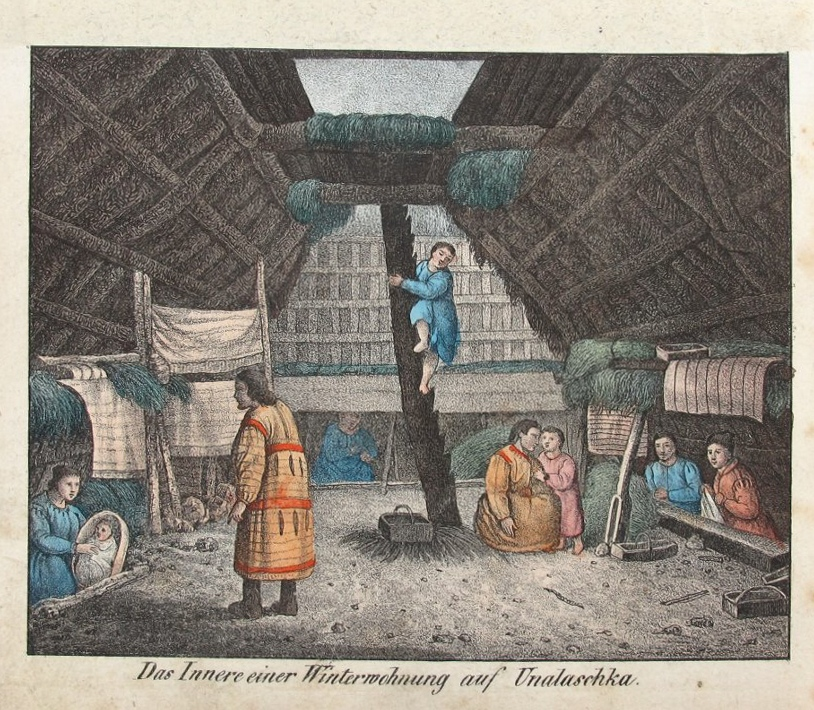
A Creole winter home in Unalaska, Aleutian Islands

Explorers, traders and missionaries arrived from Russia beginning in 1741.

In 1741 the Russian government sent Vitus Bering, a Danish-born Russian, and Aleksei Chirikov, a Russian, in the ships Saint Peter and Saint Paul on a voyage of discovery in the Northern Pacific. After the ships were separated by a storm; Chirikov discovered several eastern islands of the Aleutian group, and Bering discovered several of the western islands. Bering was shipwrecked and died in the Komandorski Islands (Commander Islands); one of which now bears his name (Bering Island), along with the surrounding Bering Sea. The survivors of Bering's party reached the Kamchatka Peninsula in a boat constructed from the wreckage of their ship, and reported the islands were rich in fur-bearing animals.

Siberian fur hunters flocked to the Commander Islands and gradually moved eastward across the Aleutian Islands to North America. In this manner, Russia gained a foothold on the northwestern coast of North America. The Aleutian Islands consequently belonged to Russia, until that country transferred all its possessions in North America to the U.S. in the 1867 Alaska Purchase.

In the 1780s Russian merchant and seafarer Grigory Shelikhov established a company based on the systematic exploitation of the indigenous peoples, with whom there was sporadic conflict with the native population, for example the Awa'uq Massacre. The colonies soon entered a relatively stable state based on cooperation, intermarriage, and official policies that provided social status, education, and professional training to children of mixed Aleut-Russian birth. Within a generation, the day-to-day administration of the Russian-American colonies was largely in the hands of native-born Alaskans. Reversing the usual trend in colonization where indigenous technologies are replaced, the Russians adopted the Aleut kayak, or baidarka, sea otter hunting techniques, and the working of native copper deposits. The Russians instituted public education, preservation of the Aleut language through transliteration of religious and other texts into Aleut via an adaptation of the Cyrillic alphabet, vaccination of the native population against smallpox, and science-based sea mammal conservation policies that were ahead of their time.

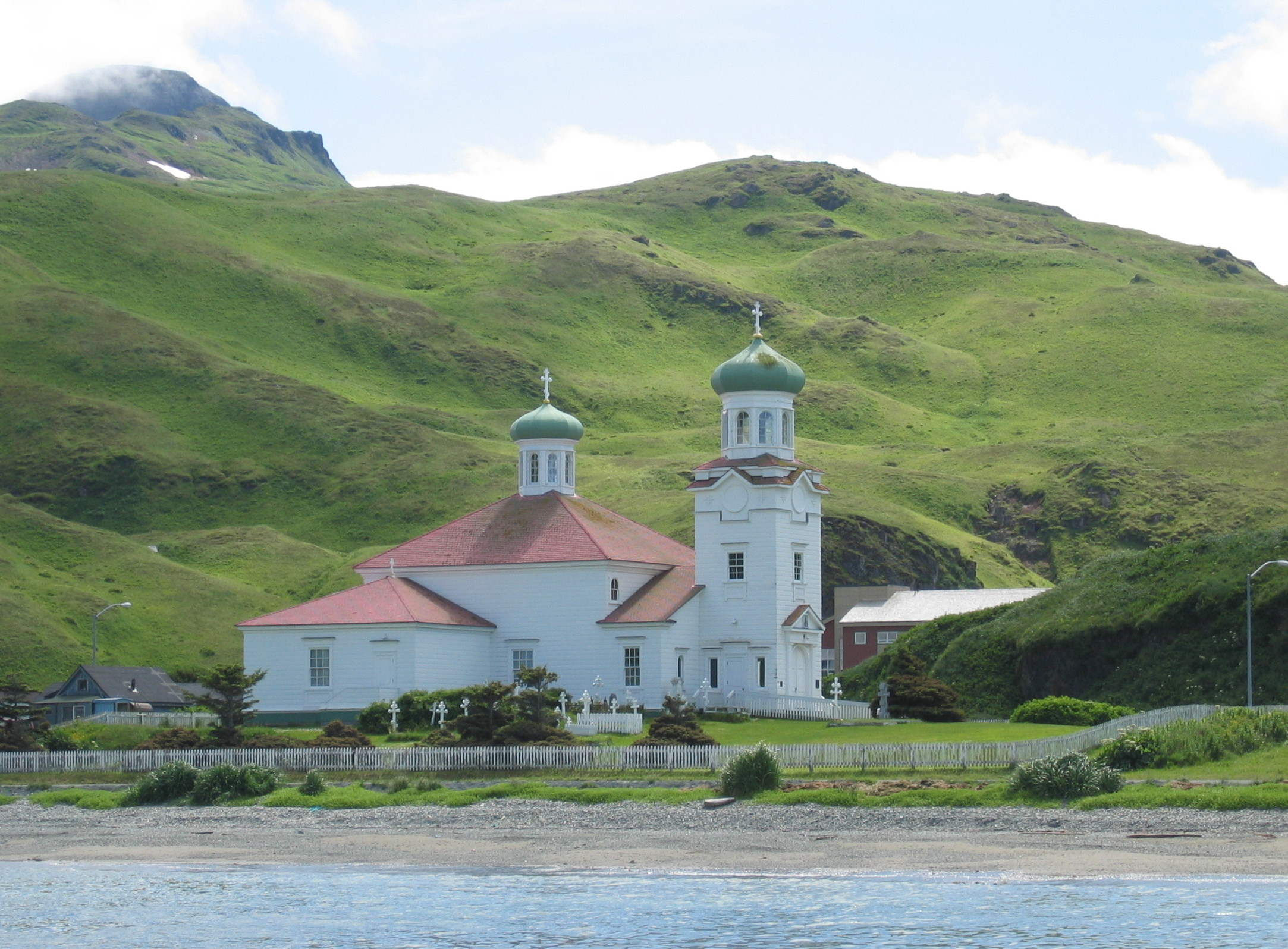
Russian Orthodox Church on Unalaska Island

By 1760 the Russian merchant Andrian Tolstykh had made a detailed census in the vicinity of Adak and extended Russian citizenship to the Aleuts.

During his third and last voyage in 1778, Captain James Cook surveyed the eastern portion of the Aleutian archipelago, accurately determined the position of some of the more important islands, and corrected many errors of former navigators.

==== Orthodox Christian heritage ====
Among the first Christian missionaries to arrive in the Aleutian Islands was a party of ten Russian Orthodox monks and priests, who arrived in 1793. Within two years, a monk named Herman was the only survivor of that party. He settled on Spruce Island, near Kodiak Island, and often defended the rights of the Aleuts against the Russian trading companies. He is now known in the Orthodox Church as Saint Herman of Alaska.

Another early Christian missionary of the Russian Orthodox Church was Father Veniaminov who arrived in Unalaska in 1824. He was named Bishop Innokentii in 1840 and moved to Sitka. He is now known in the Orthodox Church as Saint Innocent of Alaska.

The principal settlements were on Unalaska Island. The oldest was Iliuliuk (also called Unalaska), settled in 1760–1775, with a customs house and an Orthodox church.

=== U.S. possession ===
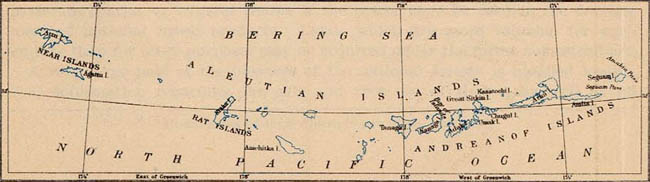
Western Aleutian Islands, from a 1916 map of the Alaska Territory

After the American purchase of Alaska from Russia in 1867, further development took place. New buildings included a Methodist mission and orphanage, and the headquarters for a considerable fleet of United States revenue cutters, which patrolled the sealing grounds of the Pribilof Islands. The first public school in Unalaska opened in 1883.

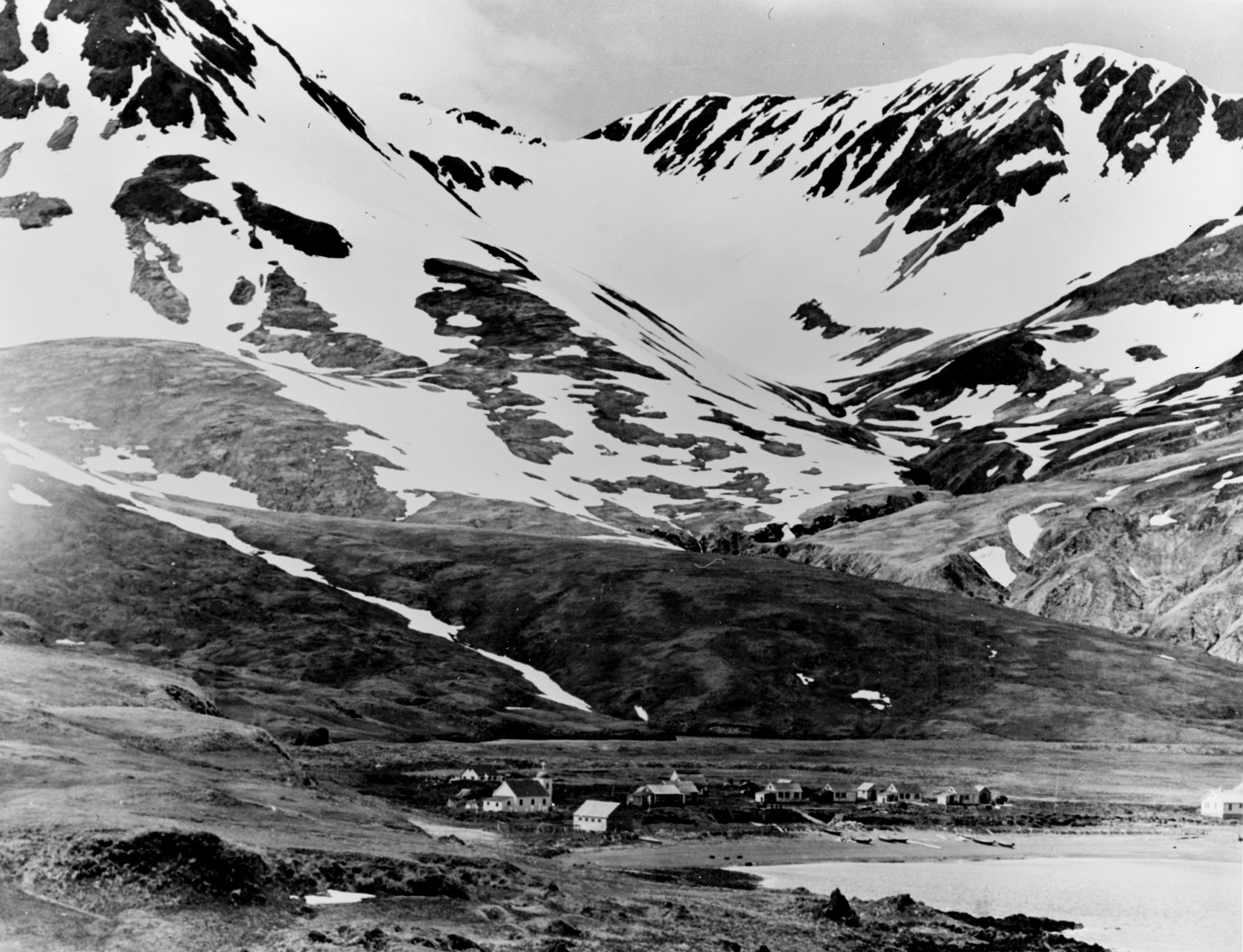
Attu village, Attu Island in June 1937

The U.S. Congress extended American citizenship to all Native Americans in 1924; this law has been held to include the indigenous peoples of Alaska. A hospital was built in Unalaska in 1933 by the U.S. Bureau of Indian Affairs.

==== World War II ====
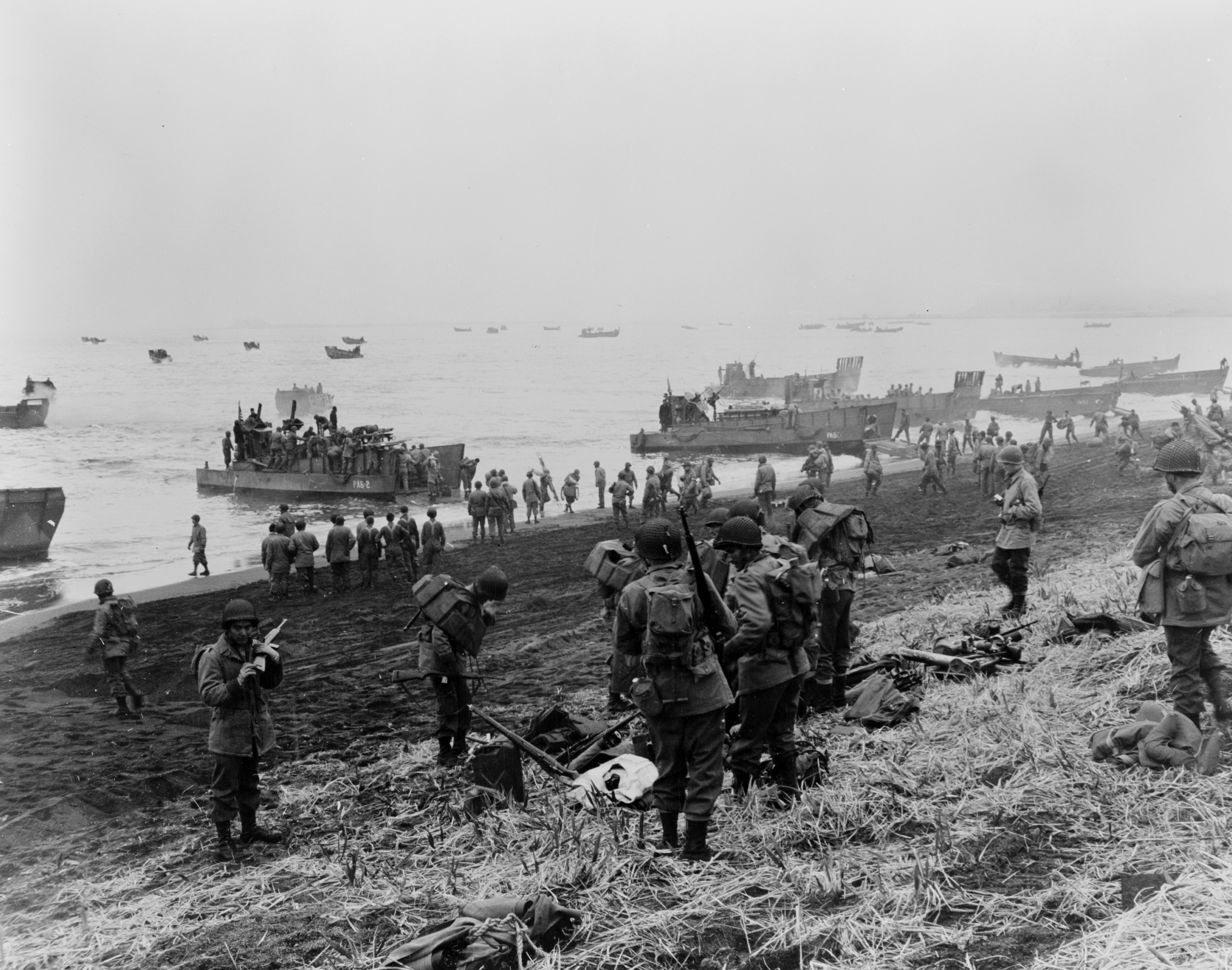
U.S. soldiers of the southern landing force on the beach at Massacre Bay, Attu Island during the Battle of Attu, May 11, 1943

On June 3, 1942, which was during World War II, in what were the only two invasions of the United States during the war, small parts of the Aleutian islands were occupied by Japanese forces, when Attu and Kiska were invaded possibly to divert American forces away from the main Japanese attack at Midway Atoll. The U.S. Navy, having broken the Japanese naval codes, proceeded as if this was just a diversion, and it did not expend large amounts of effort in defending the islands. More than 90 Americans were taken to Japan as prisoners of war.

The United States moved most of the remaining civilian population (over 800) of the Aleutians and Pribilovians to camps in the Alaska Panhandle.

In May 1943, American forces invaded Japanese-held Attu and defeated the Japanese. In August 1943, American and Canadian troops launched an invasion of Kiska, in which 34,426 men composed of both Americans and Canadian participated; however, Japanese forces had already evacuated the island, ending the campaign in the islands. The invasion was an embarrassment for the Allied forces as the entire Japanese force of 5,183 men had left the island on July 28 without the Americans noticing; however, the Americans suffered significant casualties during their "invasion"—313 men died as a result of accidents, with many dying due to accidental fire.

President Roosevelt visited Adak in 1944, meeting with commanders and eating with soldiers of the garrison. This was his first and only trip to the Aleutian Islands and Alaska as a whole. A rumor spread that FDR had accidentally left his Scottish Terrier "Fala" on one of the Islands and had to send a destroyer to retrieve the dog, costing taxpayers several million dollars. The President made fun of these rumors during a talk with the Teamsters Union in Washington DC, now known as the "Fala Speech". At this speech the President joked with the crowd saying, "Well, of course, I don't resent attacks, and my family doesn't resent attacks, but Fala does resent them!"

June 3, 2002, was celebrated as Dutch Harbor Remembrance Day. The governor of Alaska ordered state flags lowered to half-staff to honor the 43 Americans who died during the two-day Japanese air attack in 1942. The Aleutian World War II National Historic Area Visitors Center opened that month.

=== Statehood era ===
The U.S. conducted underground tests of nuclear weapons on Amchitka Island from 1965 to 1971 as part of the Vela Uniform program. The final detonation, the Cannikin, was the largest underground nuclear explosion by the U.S.

The Alaska Native Claims Settlement Act became law in 1971. In 1977, the Ounalashka Corporation (from Unalaska) declared a dividend. This was the first village corporation to declare and pay a dividend to its shareholders.

The Aleutian Islands were designated a UNESCO biosphere reserve in 1976. The Aleutians were one of 17 biosphere reserves in the United States withdrawn by request of the U.S. government from the programme in June 2017.

== Russian Aleutians ==
The Russian Aleutians are organized as Aleutsky District in Kamchatka Krai. The island group comprises:

- Commander Islands
  - Bering Island
  - Medny Island
  - Sea Lion Rock
  - Sea Otter Rocks
  - Tufted Puffin Rock (Kamen Toporkov or Ostrov Toporkov)
  - Kamen Ariy

== See also ==
- 1946 Aleutian Islands earthquake
- 2014 Aleutian Islands earthquake
- Aleutian Islands Campaign
- Aleutians East Borough, Alaska
- Aleutians West Census Area, Alaska
- List of Aleutian Island volcanoes
- List of Aleutian Islands
- List of birds of the Aleutian Islands
- List of extreme points of the United States
- Lists of islands
- Maritime fur trade
- Military history of the Aleutian Islands
- Peter the Aleut
