= Galagatax̂ =

Mythical creature in Alaskan culture

Galagatax̂ is a mythical creature in the Unangax̂ culture of the Aleutian Islands, Alaska.

According to tradition, Galagatax̂ primarily inhabits the ocean, often remaining beneath its surface. Its ears are described as resembling finely woven Unangax̂ baskets, turned upside down. When encountered at sea in an iqyax̂ (a traditional skin-on-frame, single-hatch sea kayak typically about six meters in length), it is said that the kayaker must paddle fearlessly toward Galagatax̂, passing directly between its ears. Exhibiting fear may result in the paddler being swallowed whole, as Galagatax̂'s mouth is large enough to engulf such a boat. Paddling without fear ensures safety.

In 1909, Waldemar Jochelson recorded oral traditions of Galagatax̂ from Unangax people of the western Aleutians as the "name of a (mythical) beast able to swallow a baidarka" (a type of Aleutian kayak).

The ears of the mythical beast played an important role, both in their shape and their purpose.

In the Unangax̂ culture, sometimes one's thoughts and beliefs are paramount, providing strength and courage that might not otherwise be available, and such might be the case with Galagatax̂, if you paddle your iqyax̂ without fear, you may survive even the most frightening of experiences.
