= Aleksey Yachmenev =

Aleut chief (1866–1937)

Aleksey Mironovich Yachmenev (Russian: Алексей Миронович Ячменев; 1866–1937) was an Aleut chief who lived in Unalaska. Along with Leontiy Sivtsov, Yachmenev accompanied Waldemar Jochelson on his 1909-1910 ethnological studies on the Aleut.

His son, John Yatchmeneff, wrote down the texts for John P. Harrington's 1941 work on the Aleut language.
