= Sergie Sovoroff =

Aleut educator

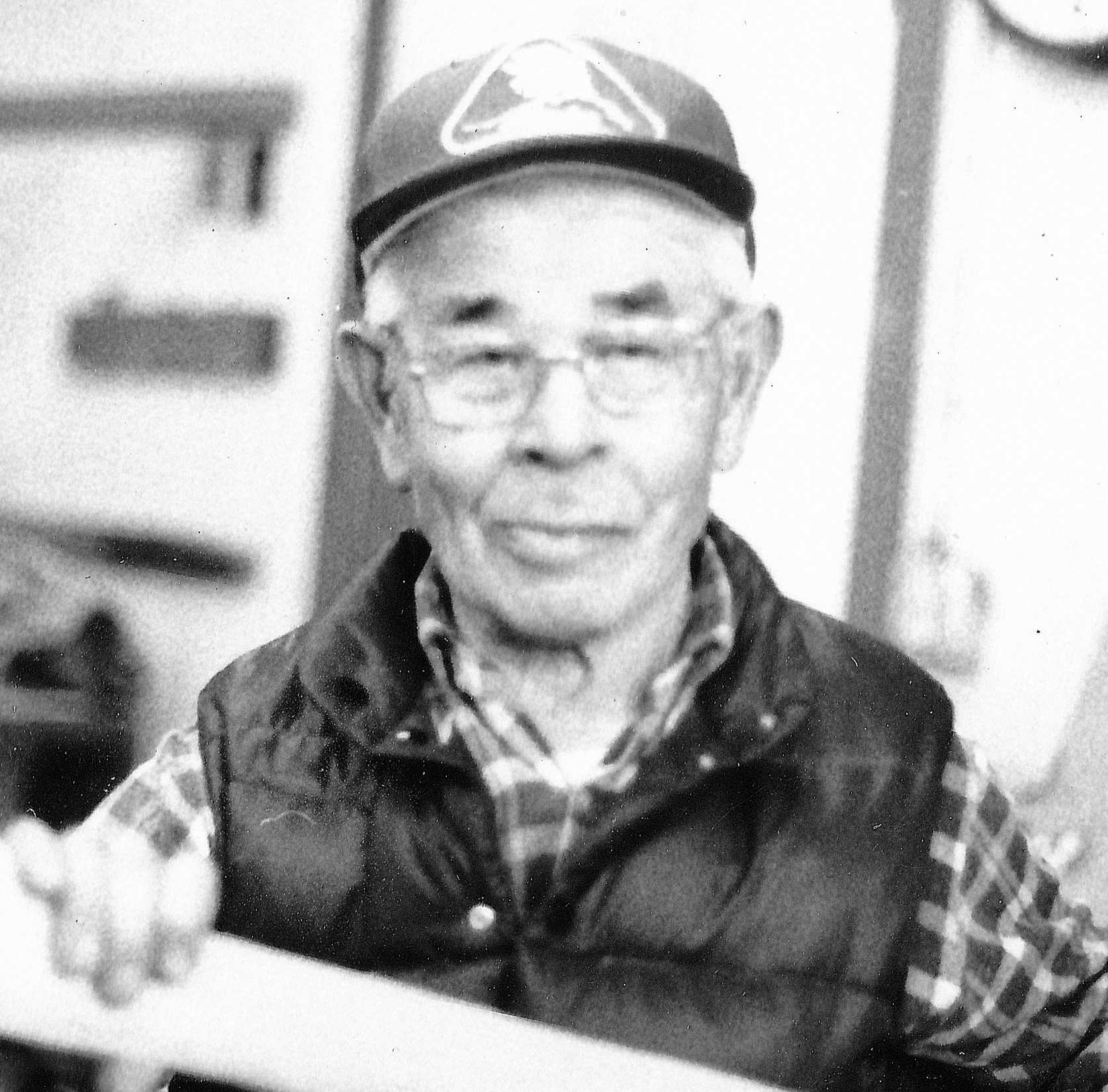

Sergie Sovoroff Aleut: Сергий Соворов; (September 17, 1901 – September 27, 1989) was an Aleut educational leader. He was born on Umnak Island in the Aleut village of Nikolski in 1902. Sergie encouraged others to learn basic survival skills in the Aleutians such as how to build an Unangam Ulax (a traditional sod house from driftwood, grass, and dirt), and how to not starve to death, "A person should teach himself to eat things from the beach and from the land. Then in case of a food shortage, he could eat Aleut food and survive."

Sovoroff was born only nine years before the United States government outlawed sea otter hunting. After 1911, the need and use of iqyax̂, Aleut sea kayaks, declined abruptly. But Sovoroff continued to see a need for creating model sea kayaks, known in his days by the Aleut name iqyax̂ or the Russian name "baidarka". Sovoroff "...kept up the tradition of making kayak models".

Model sea kayaks built by Sovoroff, quite often with three hatches with a Russian Orthodox priest seated in the middle hatch, can be seen in many museums around the world. These model sea kayaks, finely crafted by Sovoroff, often equipped with a rudder on the stern of the kayak, all too frequently bear the name of the person who purchased them or donated them to the museum, and not Sovoroff's, contrary to Aleut values of honoring elders.

Sergie died on September 27, 1989, and is buried in Nikolski, Alaska in the cemetery next to the Saint Nicholas Russian Orthodox Church; he is buried next to his wife, Agnes Sovoroff, in an unmarked grave.

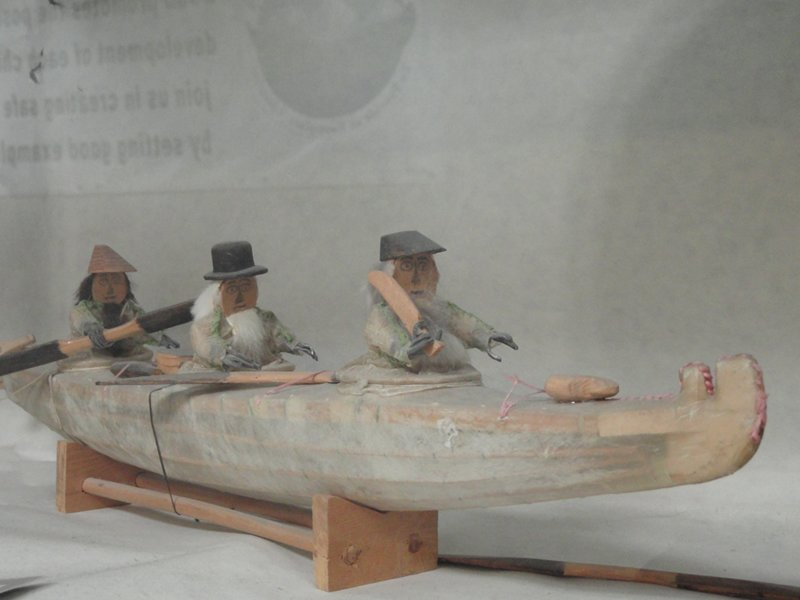

Sovoroff built model sea kayaks from the 1910s through the 1980s and his work and teaching served an important role of carrying Aleut sea kayak construction through a period when it appeared that the ancient art would be lost forever. The rebirth and revitalization of Aleut iqyax̂ in the late 20th and early 21st century can be directly attributed to the instruction, inspiration, and dedication of Sergie Sovoroff.

Sovoroff built three-hatch kayaks called ulux̂tax̂ and one-hatch kayak called iqyax̂. Sovoroff's models continue to inspire and instruct Alaska youth on how these boats are built and paddled, as well as the important role that they played in the ancient Aleutian culture. Sergie's 3D (three-dimensional) models have served as a practical instructional design tool, providing blue prints for many generations of people who become intrigued with this ancient design and want to recreate models or full-scale sea kayaks.

Sovoroff's model kayaks are on display at locations such as the Anchorage Fine Arts Museum, the Aleutian Pribilof Islands Association headquarters in Anchorage, and the Unalaska School in Unalaska, Alaska, the Burke Museum in Seattle, the Smithsonian Museum of Natural History in Washington, DC although his name is often missing from public displays.

When Russian promyshlenniks (fur hunters) invaded the Aleutians, the ancient culture and traditions of building sea kayaks was significantly altered. Sovoroff preserved the blueprint, the plans of how to build model sea kayaks, one of the most important forms of transportation in the ancient Aleut culture which has persisted on the lower Alaska Peninsula, the Shumagin Islands, the Aleutian Islands, and the Pribilof Islands for over 8000 years. The Aleut iqyax̂ (or, in Russian, "baidarka"; or, in the Inuit language, "kayak") played a paramount role within the ancient culture, similar to the role that automobiles assume in 21st century America. For example, in pre-1741 times, an ultimate insult from one Aleut youngster to another might be something like, "Your family doesn't even own a sea kayak!".
