= Sivtsov =

Sivtsov (masculine, Russian: Сивцов) or Sivtsova (feminine, Russian: Сивцова) is a Russian surname. Notable people with the surname include:

- Kanstantsin Sivtsov
- Leontiy Sivtsov
