= John Hoover =

John Hoover may refer to:

- John Hoover (artist) (1919–2011), American sculptor
- John Hoover (baseball) (1962–2014), American baseball pitcher
- J. Edgar Hoover (1895–1972), first director of the FBI, né John Edgar Hoover
- John H. Hoover (1887–1970), American admiral
- John J. Hoover (died 1880), American murderer lynched by a mob
- John Hoover Rothermel (1856–1922), American politician, member of the House of Representatives from Pennsylvania
