= Anfesia Shapsnikoff =

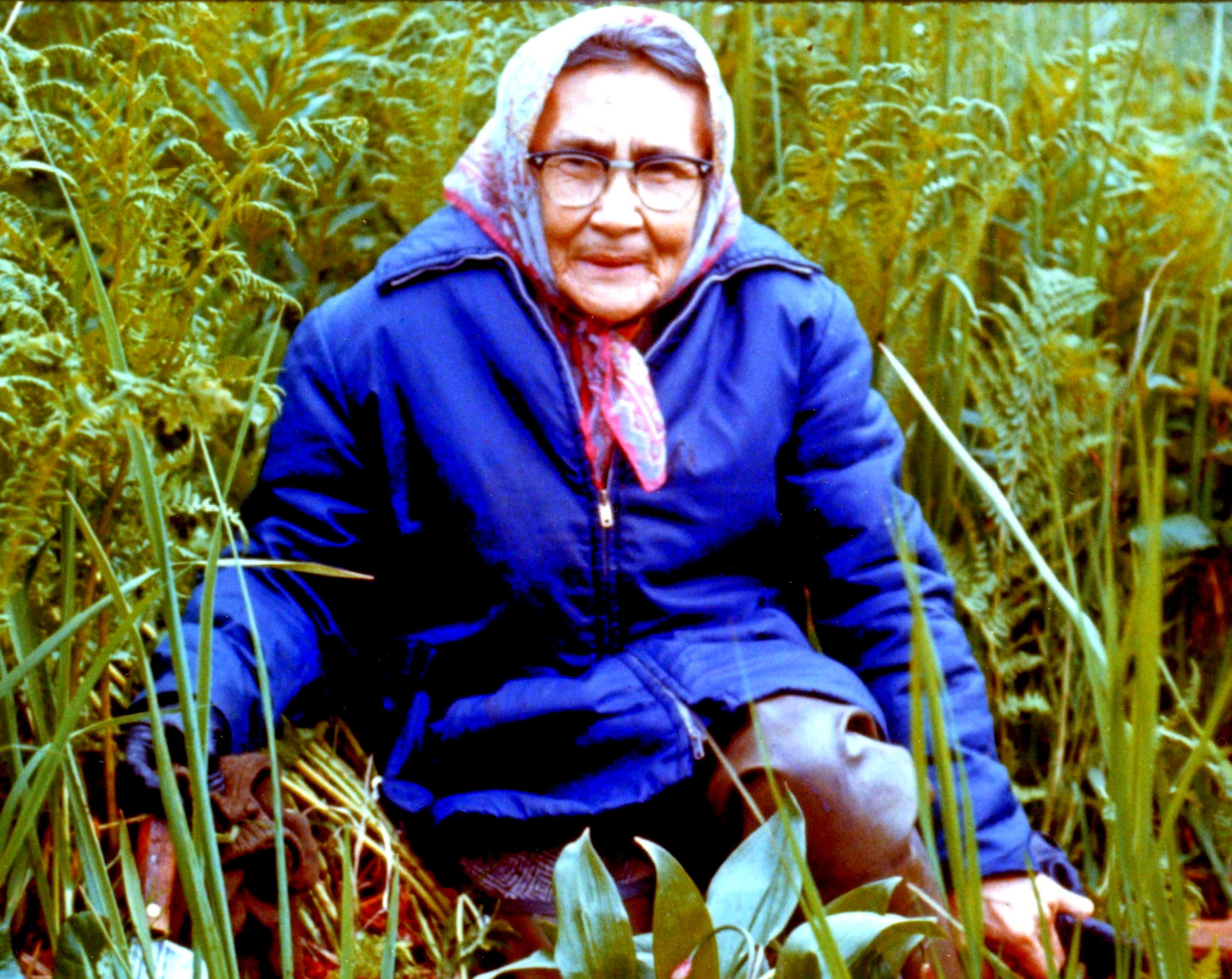

Anfesia Shapsnikoff (October 1, 1901 – January 15, 1973) was an Aleut leader and educator born October 1, 1901, at Atka, Alaska, in the Aleutian Islands. Renowned for her weaving of Aleut grass baskets, Anfesia flew to many communities throughout Alaska to teach children the lost art of Attu basket weaving.

== Biography ==
The Twenty-First Legislature of the Alaska State Legislature recognized Anfesia on February 6, 1973, as an "Aleut Tradition Bearer" who "...served as nurse, church reader, teacher and community leader nearly all her life...Who contributed history and well being for all Alaskans".

Anfesia served as a powerful role model within the Aleut communities where she taught and got involved in matters of importance to the people. "Anfesia's influence in the Aleut community endures.... Her passion for Aleut culture has infused various Aleut organizations, and her willingness to serve on civic boards has inspired others to follow her example".

Even though Anfesia was physically small, she could be "...extremely fierce at times if she found something out that she was unhappy with. And she was often unhappy with the written accounts of Aleut history".

Fifteen audio recordings of oral traditions from Anfesia are archived at the Alaska Native Language Archive at the University of Alaska Fairbanks.
