= Aleutian kayak =

Native Alaskan watercraft

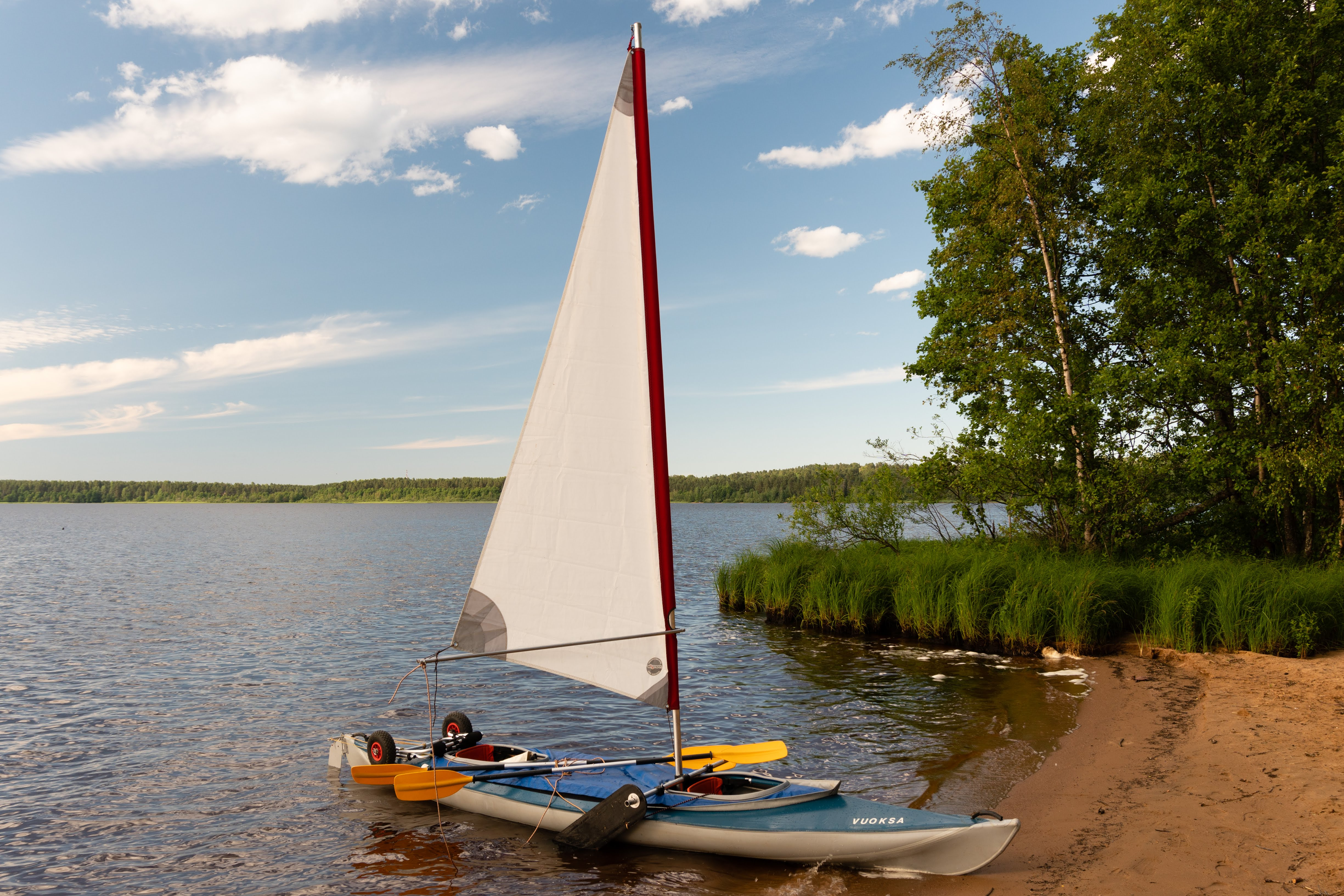
Contemporary baidarka with sail

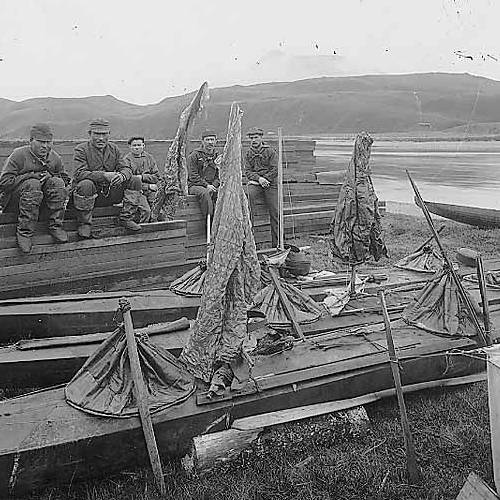
Aleut men in Unalaska in 1896, with waterproof kayak gear and garments

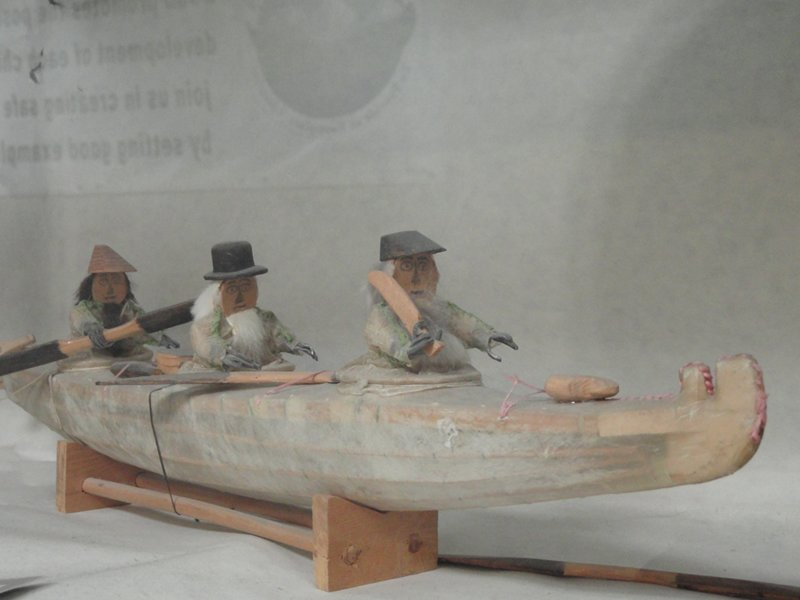
Three hatch model Aleut baidarka, by Sergie Sovoroff.

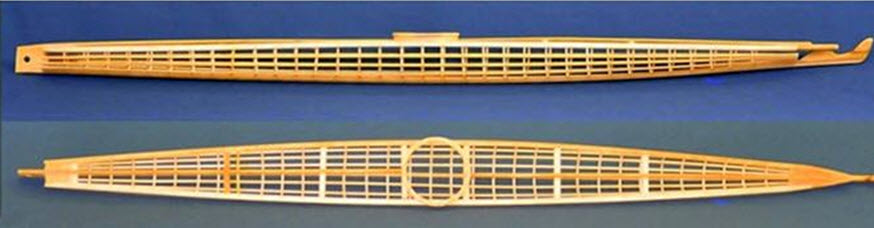
Wooden frame of 1/6th scale model iqyax.

The baidarka or Aleutian kayak (Aleut: iqyax̂) is a watercraft consisting of soft skin (artificial or natural) over a flexible space frame. Without primarily vertical flex, it is not an iqyax. Its initial design was created by the Aleut people (Unangan/Unangas), the Indigenous people of the Aleutian Islands.

Aleut are surrounded by treacherous waters and have required water transportation and hunting vessels. Due to the geography and climate of the Aleutian Islands, trees and wood were in scarce supply, and the people historically relied primarily on driftwood to create the framework of their kayaks, which they covered in sea mammals skins. They developed two types of boats: a hunting kayak with a covered deck, and an open vessel for transportation and capable of carrying goods.

== Names ==
The word bidarka or baidarka is the Russian name used for Aleutian style sea kayak. The word was coined by early Russian settlers in Alaska, who created it by adding the diminutive suffix "-ka" to the name of another, larger boat that the Aleuts called the umiak and Russians called "baidara".

== History ==
Before the arrival of the Russians, the one-hole baidarkas (kayaks) were found in abundance, along with some two-hole boats. The Russians later came to hunt fur-bearing animals, and the Russian influence on the design of the kayaks was significant, resulting in three-hole kayaks. These were probably configured with the stern man paddling and guiding the craft, while the bow man was responsible for using the atlatl (throwing board) in the hunt, with the hunt boss in the middle directing the hunt.

Some characteristics of these early kayaks are described in the words of Ivan Veniaminov (Innocent of Alaska) writing from the island of Atka in 1840:

"...The baidarki of the present-day Aleuts are no longer as perfect as those of the former Aleut riders. At that time, in the hands of excellent riders, they were so speedy that birds could not outrun them. They were so narrow and sharp-keeled that they could not stand upright in the water without a rider, and so light that a seven-year-old child could easily carry them."

== Design ==
A prominent feature of a baidarka is its forked bow (bifurcated bow). Very lightweight and maneuverable, it was made out of seal skin sewed only by Aleut women, over a frame made strictly of drift wood (since no trees grow in the Aleutian Islands), bone, and sinew. It was treated as a living being by Aleut men, and it was taboo for women to handle them once completed.

The men designed the baidarka frames to be light, fast, and flexible, tying together the wooden parts with intricate and spiritual knots braided from tough animal sinew. Unungan women prepared sea lion skins which they sewed onto the frames with bone needles, using a waterproof stitch. While out at sea, men carried with them emergency repair kits. For the Unungan, the sea kayaks lived as spiritual beings and were essential for their survival.

From early ages, Unungan boys were trained in the use of baidarka. Drawings of the Iqyax - Baidarka are available here.

== Present day ==
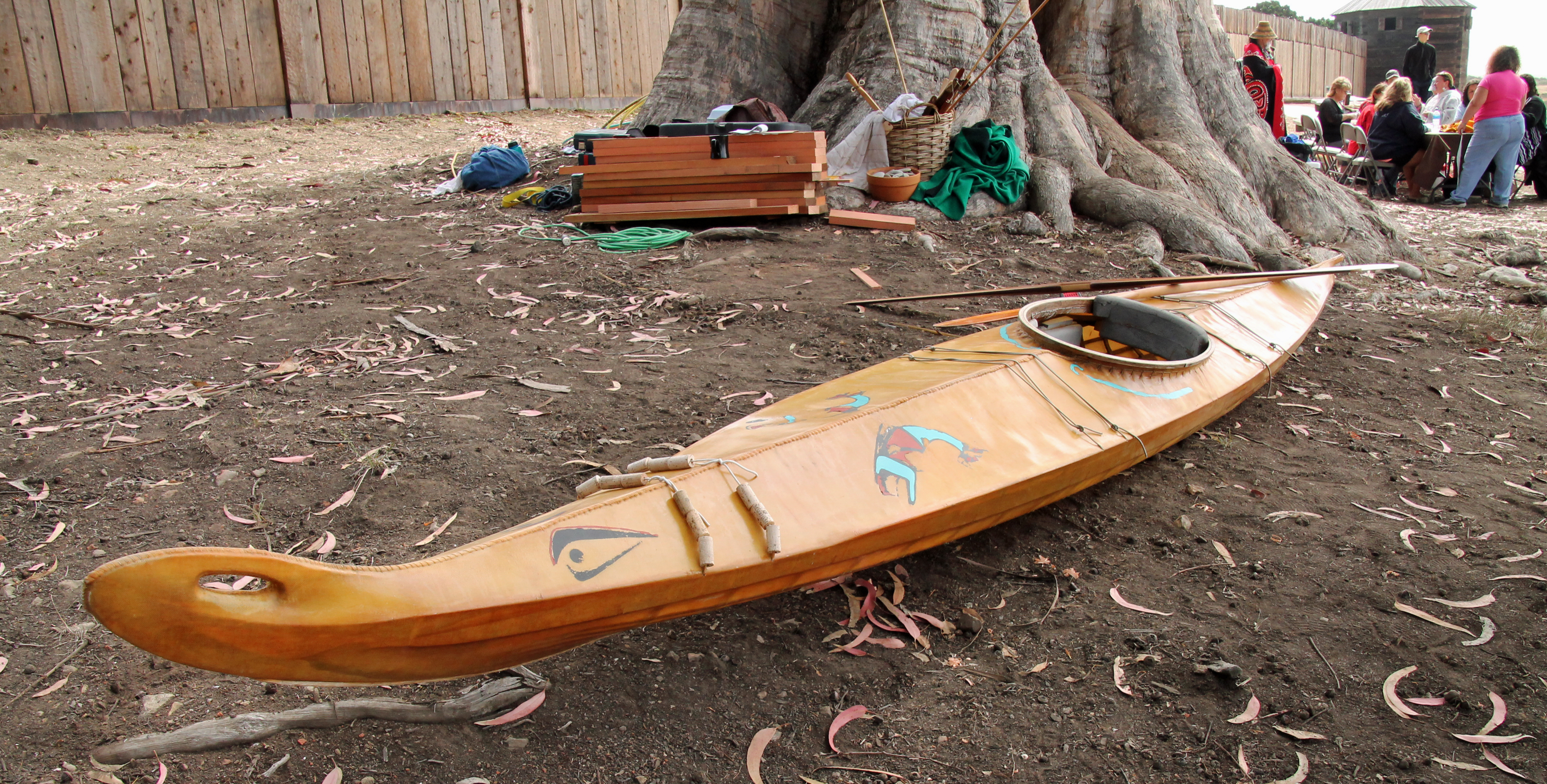
Contemporary baidarka at Fort Ross State Historic Park in 2015

In modern times, George Dyson is often credited with the revival of the baidarka, through his company Dyson, Baidarka & Company. Dyson and his boats were the subject of Kenneth Brower's book The Starship and the Canoe, and Dyson himself wrote the book Baidarka in 1986. Dyson's Baidarkas are made from modern materials such as aluminium for the frame and coated polyester fabric for the skin.

Another well known baidarka revivalist is ethnographer David Zimmerly, who has documented the history of baidarka and the people who used them. In 1983 Zimmerly published two articles in "Small Boat Journal" that showed how to build a baidarka.

Modern baidarkas are fast collapsible rowing boats, based on aluminum alloy frame with skin made of PVC fabric. Often the inflatable buoyancy chambers are embedded into the skin, resulting in increased safety and performance. Some designs additionally support the installation of sail rigging, rudder and fin keel.

Iqyax builders who kept the tradition of building skin-on-skeleton boats alive in the 20th century include Sergie Sovoroff.
