= De with breve =

Cyrillic letter used for /ð/ in Bering Aleut

- Д̆ д̆

Usage
- Writing system: Cyrillic
- Type: Alphabetic
- Language of origin: Aleut
- Sound values: /ð/

De with breve (Д̆ д̆; italics: Д̆ д̆) is a letter of the Cyrillic script. Its form is derived from the Cyrillic De (Д д) by adding a breve.

De with breve is used only in the alphabet of the Aleut language (Bering dialect), where it represents the voiced dental fricative /ð/, like the pronunciation of ⟨th⟩ in English “they” /ðeɪ/. For example, ‘ад̆аӽ’ /aðɑχ/ – father, ‘чӣд̆аӽ’ /ˈtʃiːðaχ/ – baby bird.

== See also ==
- Cyrillic characters in Unicode
