= Samalga Island =

Island in Alaska, United States

Coordinates: 52°47′00″N 169°12′17″W

Location in Alaska

Samalga Island (Aleut: Samalĝa; Russian: Самалга) is the westernmost island in the Fox Islands group of the eastern Aleutian Islands, Alaska. It is 5.36 miles (8.63 km) long and is situated at the southwestern tip of Umnak Island. It has a land area of 1.589 square miles (4.12 km^{2}) and is uninhabited. It is separated from the Islands of Four Mountains group to the west by the Samalga Pass. Samalga is the furthest point west on the Aleutian Island chain that still keeps the Alaska UTC−9 time zone (UTC−8 daylight time from the second Sunday in March to the first Sunday in November as of 2010). It is also the closest Alaskan island to Hawaii.
