= John Hoover (artist) =

American sculptor

- Born: October 13, 1919; Cordova, Alaska, US
- Died: September 3, 2011 (aged 91); Washington, US
- Known for: Sculpture

John Hoover (October 13, 1919 – September 3, 2011) was an American artist, known for his creation of contemporary art pieces based on Native Alaskan traditions.

Hoover was born in Cordova to a Dutch father and an Aleut-Russian mother. He worked as a ski instructor and commercial fisherman, before taking up a career in art after designing and building a fishing boat in his backyard which he considered like a sculpture.

Hoover's work was exhibited internationally, and his artworks feature prominently in several Anchorage buildings such as the William A. Egan Civic and Convention Center, the Alaska Native Medical Center and the Alaska Native Heritage Center.

In 2002, he was honored with a retrospective of his work at the Anchorage Museum, and he was awarded an honorary doctorate by the University of Alaska Anchorage in May 2011.

Hoover died at his home near Grapeview on the Puget Sound in Washington state on September 3, 2011, aged 91.
