= Leontiy Sivtsov =

Aleut author (1872–1919)

- Born: Leontiy Ivanovich Sivtsov; 1872; Unalaska, Alaska
- Died: 1919 (aged 46–47); Unalaska, Alaska
- Occupation: Author

Leontiy Ivanovich Sivtsov (Russian: Леонтий Иванович Сивцов; 1872–1919) was a church reader and author.

== Life and career ==
Leontiy Sivtsov was born in 1872 in Unalaska, Alaska. He is the son of Ivan Sivtsov and had a mixed of Aleut and Russian ancestry. He studied at the local Russian Orthodox Church school in the Aleutian Islands.

Sivtsov served as the psalm reader, at the Church of the Holy Ascension in Unalaska. He held during the 20th century as part of the Russian Orthodox Church in the Aleutian Islands.

Sivtsov died in 1872 in Unalaska, Alaska at the age of 46.

== Personal life ==
Sivtsov was a bilingual, being fluent in Aleut and Russian.
