= Aleuts =

Indigenous people of the Aleutian Islands

унаӈан (unangan) унаӈас (unangas)
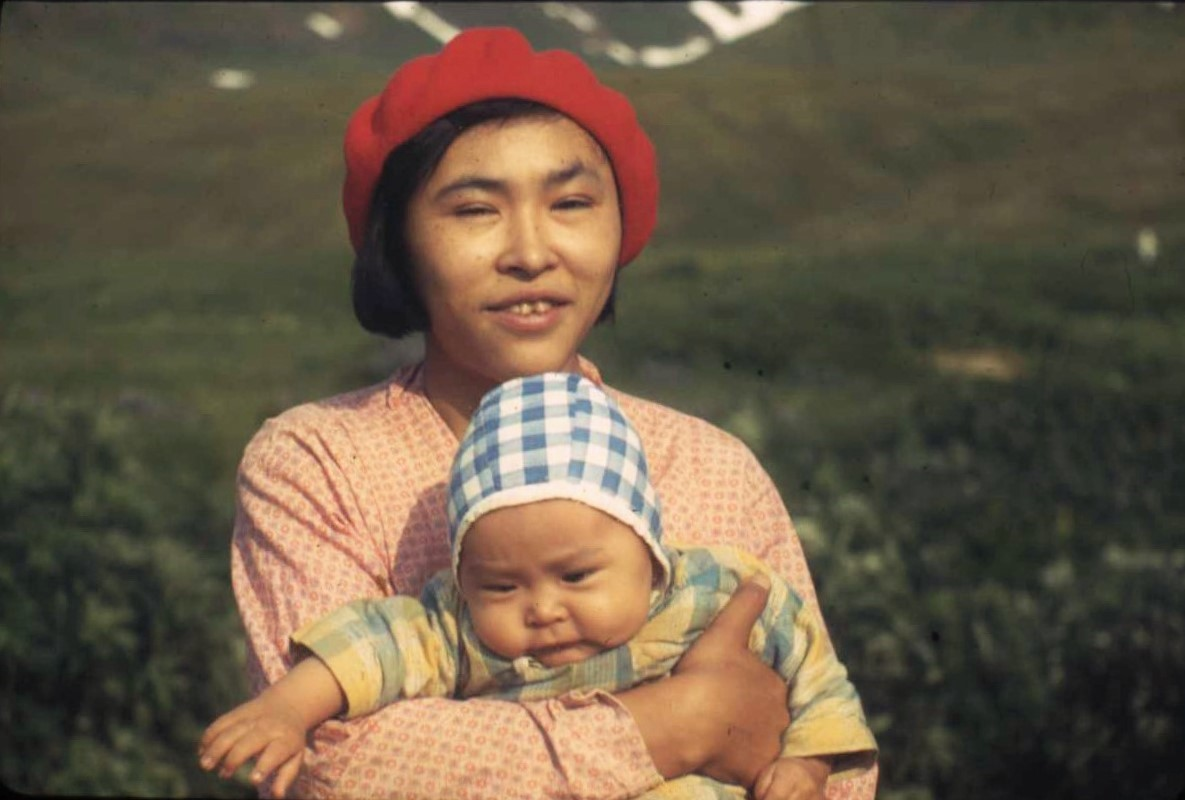
- Attu Aleut mother and child, 1941

Regions with significant populations
- United States Alaska: 6,752
- Russia Kamchatka Krai: 482

Languages
- English, Russian, Aleut

Religion
- Eastern Orthodoxy (Russian Orthodox Church), Animism

Related ethnic groups
- Inuit, Yupik, Sirenik, Sadlermiut, Alaskan Creoles

- Person: Unangax̂
- People: Unangan (east); Unangas (west)
- Language: Unangam Tunuu
- Country: Unangam Tanangin

Aleuts (/ˌæ.liːˈuːt/ AL-ee-OOT; Aleut: Unangan (west) or Unangas (east) Russian: Алеуты, romanized: Aleuty) are the Indigenous people of the Aleutian Islands, which are located between the North Pacific Ocean and the Bering Sea. Both the Aleuts and the islands are politically divided between the U.S. state of Alaska and the Russian administrative division of Kamchatka Krai. This group is also known as the Unangax̂ in Unangam Tunuu, the Aleut language. There are 13 federally recognized Aleut tribes in the Aleut Region of Alaska. In 2000, Aleuts in Russia were recognized by government decree as a small-numbered Indigenous people.

== Etymology ==
In the Aleut language, they are known by the endonyms Unangan (eastern dialect) and Unangas (western dialect); both terms can be translated to "original people". (Note: The singular form is Unangax̂. The Cyrillic spelling of Unangan and Unangas are Унаӈан and Унаӈас, respectively.) Unangax̂ is considered to be the best collective term for the people of the region as it is correct in both the eastern and western dialects. The Russian term "Aleut" was a general term used for both the Native population of the Aleutian Islands and their neighbors to the east in the Kodiak Archipelago, who were also referred to as "Pacific Eskimos" or Sugpiat/Alutiit.

== Language ==
Aleut people traditionally speak Unangam Tunuu, the Aleut language, although nowadays most speak English and Russian in their respective countries as a result of colonization. An estimated 150 people in the United States and five people in Russia speak Aleut, although there are ongoing revitalization efforts. The language belongs to the Eskaleut language family and includes three dialects: Eastern Aleut, spoken on the Eastern Aleutian, Shumagin, Fox and Pribilof Islands; Atkan, spoken on Atka and Bering islands; and the now extinct Attuan dialect.

The Pribilof Islands has the highest number of active speakers of Unangam Tunuu. Most Native elders speak Aleut, but it is rare for common people to speak the language fluently.

Beginning in 1829, Aleut was written in the Cyrillic script. From 1870, the language has been written in the Latin script. An Aleut dictionary and grammar have been published, and portions of the Bible were translated into Aleut.

== Tribes ==
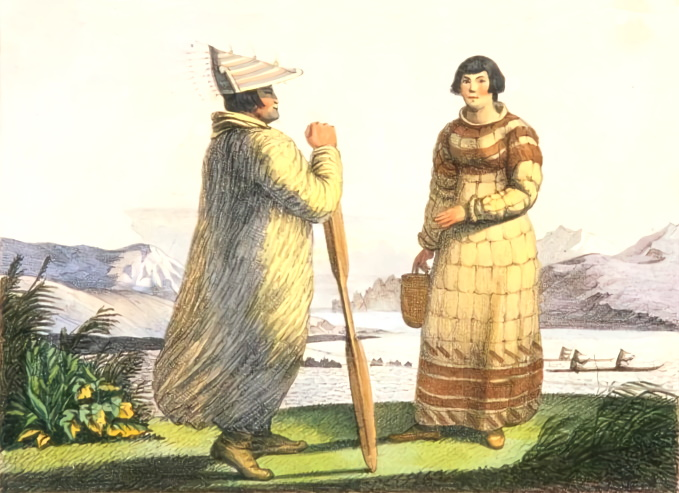
Customary Aleut dress

Aleut (Unangan) dialects and tribes:

- Attuan dialect and speaking tribes:
  - Sasignan (in Attuan dialect)/Sasxnan (in Eastern dialect)/Sasxinas (in Western dialect) or Near Islanders: in the Near Islands (Attu, Agattu, Semichi).
  - Kasakam Unangangis (in Aleut, lit. 'Russian Aleut') or Copper Island Aleut: in the Commander Islands of Russian Federation (Bering, Medny).
- ? Qax̂un or Rat Islanders : in the Buldir Island and Rat Islands (Kiska, Amchitka, Semisopochnoi).
- Atkan dialect or Western Aleut or Aliguutax̂ (in Aleut) and speaking tribes:
  - Naahmiĝus or Delarof Islanders : in the Delarof Islands (Amatignak) and Andreanof Islands (Tanaga).
  - Niiĝuĝis or Andreanof Islanders : in the Andreanof Islands (Kanaga, Adak, Atka, Amlia, Seguam).
- Eastern Aleut dialect and speaking tribes:
  - Akuuĝun or Uniiĝun or Islanders of the Four Mountains : in the Islands of Four Mountains (Amukta, Kagamil).
  - Qawalangin or Fox Islanders : in the Fox Islands (Umnak, Samalga, western part of Unalaska).
  - Qigiiĝun or Krenitzen Islanders : in the Krenitzin Islands (eastern part of Unalaska, Akutan, Akun, Tigalda).
  - Qagaan Tayaĝungin or Sanak Islanders : in the Sanak Islands (Unimak, Sanak).
  - Taxtamam Tunuu dialect of Belkofski.
  - Qaĝiiĝun or Shumigan Islanders : in the Shumagin Islands.

== Population and distribution ==
Map of Aleut tribes and dialects

Settlement of Aleuts in the Far Eastern Federal District by urban and rural settlements in%, 2010 census

Aleuts historically lived throughout the Aleutian Islands and the far western part of the Alaska Peninsula, with an estimated population of around 25,000 prior to European contact. In the 1820s, the Russian-American Company administered a large portion of the North Pacific during a Russian-led expansion of the fur trade. They resettled many Aleut families to the Commander Islands (within the Aleutsky District of the Kamchatka Krai in Russia) and to the Pribilof Islands (in Alaska). These continue to have majority-Aleut communities.

According to the 2000 census, 11,941 people identified as being Aleut, while 17,000 identified as having partial Aleut ancestry. Prior to sustained European contact, approximately 25,000 Aleut lived in the archipelago. The Encyclopædia Britannica Online states that more than 15,000 people have Aleut ancestry in the early 21st century. Aleuts suffered high fatalities in the 19th and early 20th centuries from Eurasian infectious diseases to which they had no immunity. In addition, the population suffered as their customary lifestyles were disrupted. Russian traders, and later Europeans, married Aleut women and had families with them.

== History ==
=== Prehistory ===
Archaeological evidence indicates that the Aleuts first occupied the Aleutian Islands approximately 9,000 years ago, beginning with the eastern islands, evidenced by sites on Unalaska and Anagula that date to this approximate time period. The Aleuts then spread westward across the islands with the oldest sites of the western islands beginning to appear 2,500 years ago. The technologies developed by the Aleut focused on the procurement of food and resources from the sea and coastal zones, with an emphasis on fishing, collecting marine invertebrates, and the hunting of sea mammals. Aleut tools were created from all available resources, including blades from local minerals such as obsidian and chert, bird bones utilized in tools such as needles and awls, and mammal bones utilized in tools such as wedges, spoons, and harpoon points.

=== After contact with Russia ===
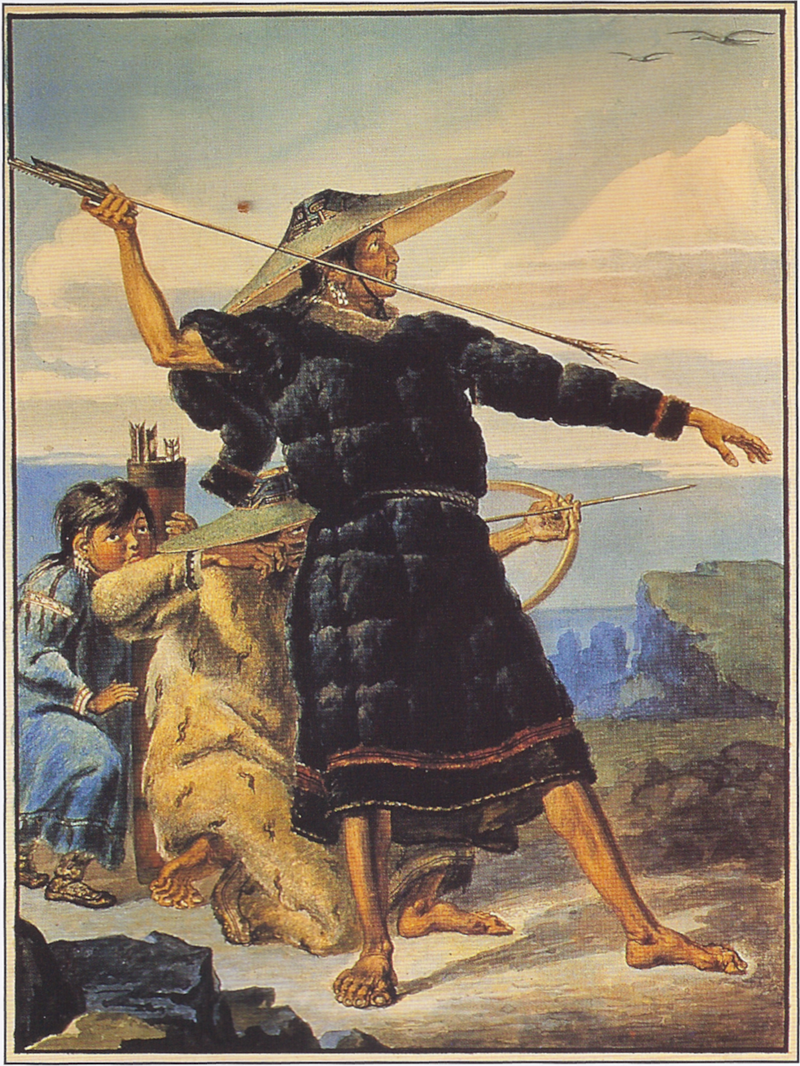
Aleut in Festival Dress in Alaska, watercolor by Mikhail Tikhanov, 1818

Russian Orthodox missionaries arrived in Kodiak in 1794. Many Aleuts became Christian. Of the numerous Russian Orthodox congregations in Alaska, most are majority Alaska Native or Native Alaskan in ethnicity. One of the earliest Christian martyrs in North America was Saint Peter the Aleut.

Russian traders "took Aleut women and children hostage" to force Aleut men to hunt foxes and sea otters so the Russians could have their pelts, and often additionally enslaved Aleut men.

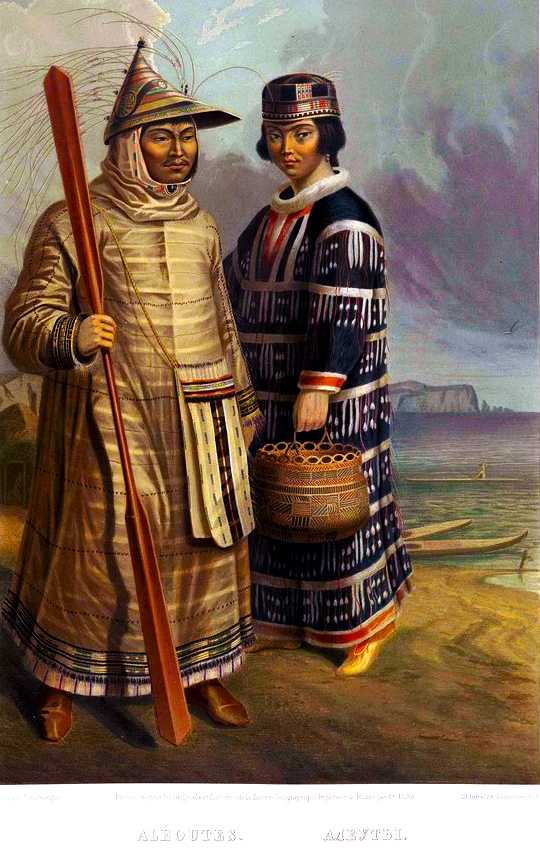
Aleuts. Ethnographic description of the peoples of the Russian Empire by Gustav-Fyodor Khristianovich Pauli (1862)

==== Contact with Japanese and uprising against Russians ====
In the 18th century, Russian promyshlenniki traders established settlements on the islands. There was high demand for the furs that the Aleuts provided from hunting. In 1783, Japanese sailor Daikokuya Kōdayū came into contact with these Russians and the native Aleuts, after getting shipwrecked on Amchitka Island with his crew. This occurred during Japan's Sakoku period of 1635 to 1854, when Japanese citizens were banned from leaving their homeland. Kōdayū lived among Russians until 1792, and when he returned home to Japan, he bought with him a Russian map which depicted the true shape of Australia, with prior Japanese maps depicting Australia as double its size and with New Guinea still attached. Kōdayū's encounter with the Aleuts was depicted in the 1992 Japanese film Dreams of Russia, which was based on his story.

While Kōdayū was living on Amchitka in May 1784, the local Aleuts there revolted against the Russian traders. (The Russians had a small trading post there.) According to the Aleuts, in an account recorded by the Japanese castaways and published in 2004, otters were decreasing year by year. The Russians paid the Aleuts less and less in goods in return for the furs they made. The Japanese learned that the Aleuts felt the situation was at crisis. The leading Aleuts negotiated with the Russians, saying they had failed to deliver enough supplies in return for furs. Nezimov, leader of the Russians, ordered two of his men, Stephanov (ステッパノ Suteppano) and Kazhimov (カジモフ Kazimofu) to kill his mistress Oniishin (オニイシン Oniishin), who was the Aleut chief's daughter, because he doubted that Oniishin had tried to dissuade her father and other leaders from pushing for more goods.

After the four leaders had been killed, the Aleuts began to move from Amchitka to neighboring islands. Nezimov, leader of the Russian group, was jailed after the whole incident was reported to Russian officials. (According to Hokusa bunryaku (Japanese: 北槎聞略), written by Katsuragawa Hoshū after interviewing Daikokuya Kōdayū.)

=== Aleut massacre against the Nicoleño Tribe in California ===
According to Russian American Company (RAC) records which were translated and published in the Journal of California and Great Basin Anthropology, a 200-ton otter hunting ship named Il’mena with a mixed-nationality crew, including a majority Aleut contingent, was involved in conflict resulting in a massacre of the Indigenous people of San Nicolas Island.

In 1814, to obtain more of the commercially valuable otter pelts, a Russian company brought a party of conscripted Aleut hunters to the coastal island of San Nicolas, near the Alta California-Baja California border. The locally resident Nicoleño nation sought a payment from the Aleut hunters for the large number of otters being killed in the area. Disagreement arose, turning violent; an Aleut was killed, and in retaliation Aleuts killed a number of Nicoleño (the exact amount is unknown). In 1835, the remaining Nicoleños were removed from the island, except for one woman and possibly her child, who were left behind. In 1853 that woman, later christened Juana Maria, was found and taken to Santa Barbara. She may have been the last living Nicoleñan, as what happened to the others after they were brought to the mainland is unknown (Juana Maria, the Lone Woman of San Nicolas).

=== World War II ===
==== Japanese occupation ====
When World War II broke out, the Aleutian Islands were under the control of the United States as they had been since March 1867, when they were included in the U.S. purchase of Alaska from Russia. In June 1942, Japanese forces occupied Kiska and Attu Islands in the western Aleutians, with this representing their northernmost region of operation in the Pacific War, which covered an area extending as far south as Australia. They later transported 41 captive Attu Islanders to Otaru, Hokkaido, where they were held as prisoners of war in harsh conditions. Roughly half of them died while they were imprisoned, with one also dying on the Japanese ship before it arrived in Otaru. The Otaru deaths were caused by the spread of tuberculosis among the imprisoned Aleuts, and starvation/malnutrition, as the Japanese primarily fed them small portions of rice. Aleut chief Mike Hodikoff and his son George died after eating poisoned food from a garbage bin, since they were starving in the prison. The Japanese also forced the imprisoned Aleut children to learn the Japanese language, threatening to kill them if they did not. Alex Prossoff, a survivor of the prison camp, later said in 1988, "as long as Americans are fight for my country I'll be on their side. I told them Japs destroy our homes, make us prisoners and put us on a land where we cannot talk his language. So I cannot say Japs are good people."

The World War II campaign by the United States to retake Attu and Kiska was a significant component of the operations in the American and Pacific theaters. The Japanese left an extensive amount of booby traps and land mines on Attu and Kiska which could still explode, making the islands unsafe for continued habitation. A large number of the booby traps and land mines on Kiska were deliberately placed by the Japanese just before they secretly evacuated the island, rather than being placed there before or during the conflict.

==== Internment ====
Fearing a Japanese attack on other Aleutian Islands and mainland Alaska, the U.S. government evacuated 800 more Aleuts from the western chain and the Pribilofs, placing them in internment camps in southeast Alaska, where many died of measles, influenza and other infectious diseases which spread quickly in the overcrowded dormitories. In total, about 75 died in American internment and 22 died while prisoners of the Japanese. The Aleut Restitution Act of 1988 was an attempt by Congress to compensate the survivors. On June 17, 2017, the U.S. government formally apologized for the internment of the Unangan people and their treatment in the camps.

=== Population's decline ===
Before their way of life was changed by major influences from the outside world, approximately 25,000 Aleuts were located on the archipelago. Foreign diseases, harsh treatment and disruption of aboriginal society soon reduced the population to less than one-tenth this number. According to the 1885 book The Island World of the Pacific Ocean, the Aleutian Islands had a population of roughly 3,000 during that time. The 1910 Census count showed 1,491 Aleuts. In the 2000 Census, 11,941 people identified as being Aleut; nearly 17,000 said Aleuts were among their ancestors. This rose to 13,805 people in the 2020 Census.

== Culture ==
=== Housing ===
Aleuts historically constructed partially underground houses called barabara. Aleuts traditionally built houses by digging an oblong square pit in the ground, usually 50 by 20 feet (15.2 by 6.1 m) or smaller. The pit was then covered by a roof framed with driftwood, thatched with grass, and then covered with earth for insulation. Inside trenches were dug along the sides, with mats placed on top to keep them clean. The bedrooms were at the back of the lodge, opposite the entrance. Several families would stay in one house, with their own designated areas. Rather than fireplaces or bonfires in the middle, lanterns were hung in the house.

==== Adaption to weather and earthquakes ====
Aleuts adapted to living in a landscape exposed to multiple natural hazards, including severe subarctic weather and earthquakes/tsunamis. The Aleutian Islands are situated along one of the world's most seismically active plate boundaries, where the Pacific Plate subducts beneath the North American Plate, with many major earthquakes and tsunamis having occurred in the region as a result. These conditions influenced aspects of traditional settlement and architecture, including the use of semi-subterranean dwellings. The semi-subterranean barabaras were particularly suited to the Aleutians' fierce winds, rain and cold, while the use of locally available materials allowed dwellings to be maintained within a largely treeless environment. According to Lillie McGarvey, a 20th-century Aleut leader, barabaras kept "occupants dry from the frequent rains, warm at all times, and snugly sheltered from the high winds common to the area". Settlement locations were also influenced by the environment; the ancestral Anangula Village on Anangula Island was built on a raised coastal terrace more than 70 feet above the sea. This helped to reduce exposure to coastal flooding and storm-driven waves, with semi-subterranean houses arranged along the edge of the site. Later accounts have described traditional dwellings as capable of withstanding the earthquakes experienced in the region, although they are better understood as part of a broader adaptation to the environment, rather than as evidence of purpose-built earthquake engineering.

=== Subsistence ===
Traditional Aleuts survive by hunting and gathering. They fish for salmon, crabs, shellfish, and cod, as well as hunt sea mammals such as seal, walrus, and whales. They can process fish and sea mammals in a variety of ways: dried, smoked, or roasted. Caribou, muskoxen, deer, moose, whale, and other types of game were eaten roasted or preserved for later use. They dried berries; often processed as alutiqqutigaq, a mixture of berries, fat, and fish. The boiled skin and blubber of a whale is a delicacy, as is that of walrus.

Today, many Aleut continue to eat customary and locally sourced foods but also buy processed foods from abroad, which is expensive in Alaska.

=== Ethnobotany ===
A full list of their ethnobotany has been compiled, with 65 documented plant uses.

=== Visual arts ===
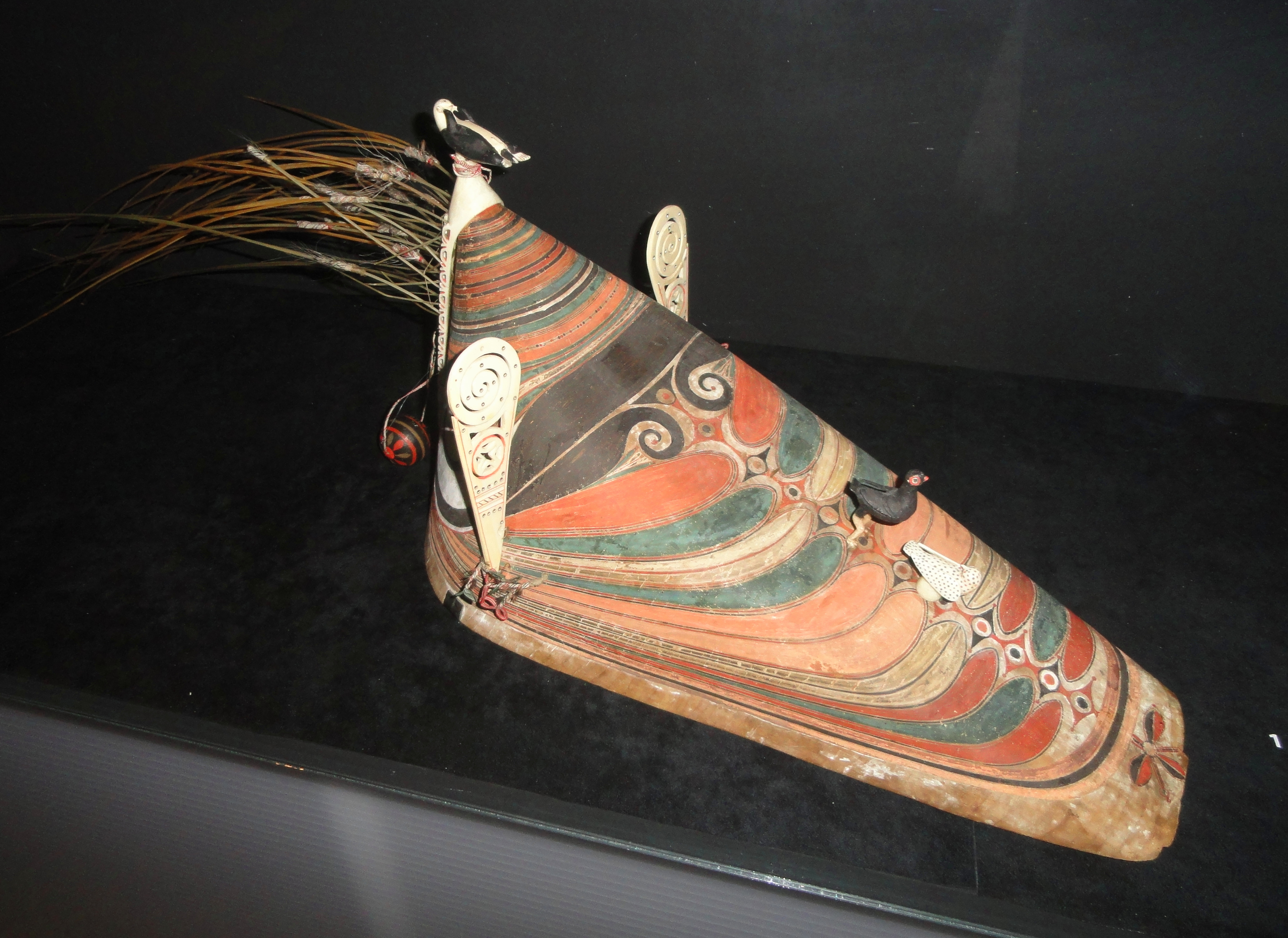
Men's chagudax, or bentwood hunting visor, Arvid Adolf Etholén collection, Museum of Cultures, Helsinki, Finland

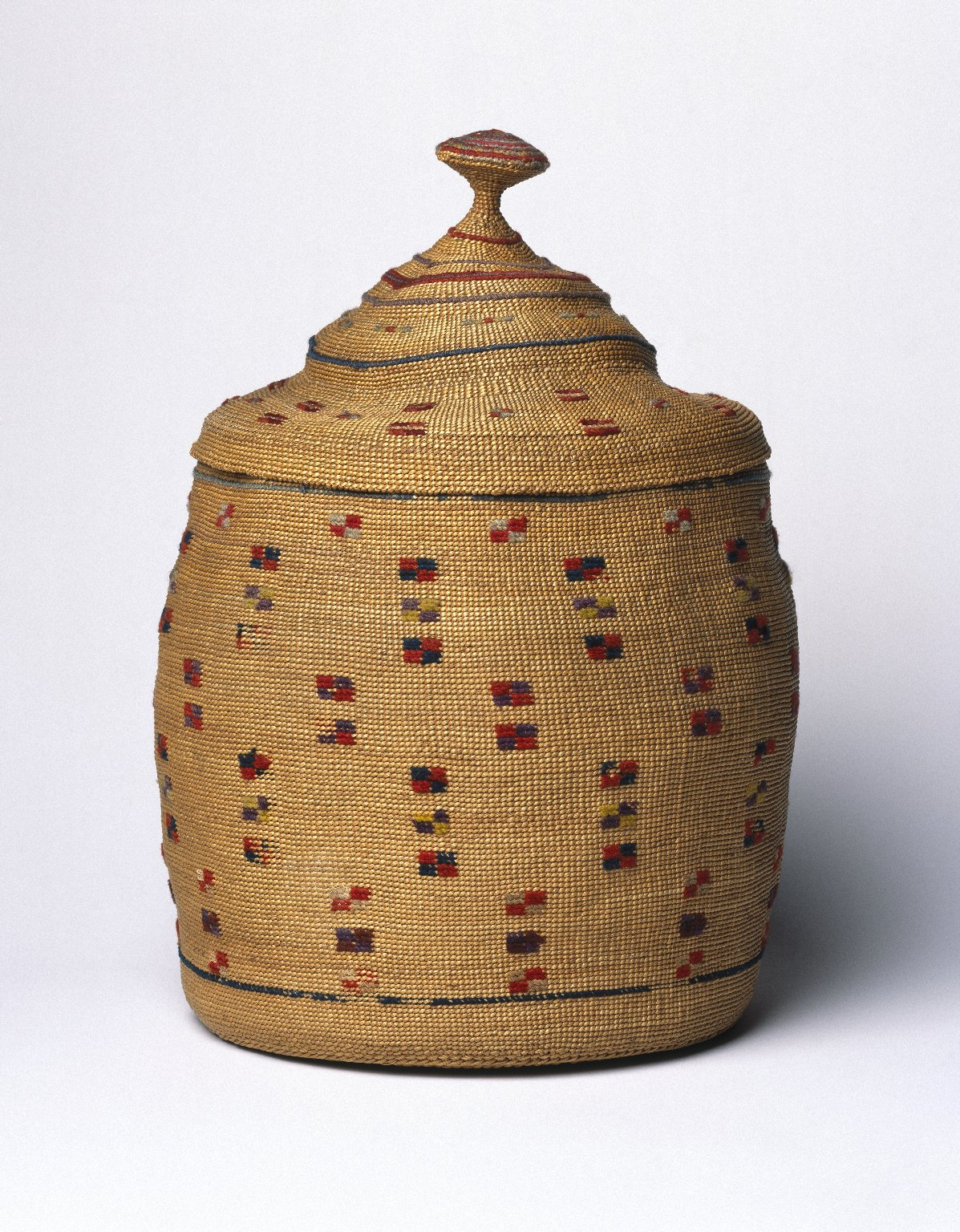
Unknown Aleut artist, sea lyme grass basket and lid embellished with wool embroidery, early 20th century, Brooklyn Museum

Customary arts of the Aleuts include weapon-making, building of baidarkas (special hunting boats), weaving, figurines, clothing, carving, and mask making. Men as well as women often carved ivory and wood. Nineteenth century craftsmen were famed for their ornate wooden hunting hats, which feature elaborate and colorful designs and may be trimmed with sea lion whiskers, feathers, and walrus ivory. Andrew Gronholdt of the Shumagin Islands has played a vital role in reviving the ancient art of building the chagudax or bentwood hunting visors.

Aleut women sewed finely stitched, waterproof parkas from seal gut and wove fine baskets from sea-lyme grass (Elymus mollis). Some Aleut women continue to weave ryegrass baskets. Aleut arts are practiced and taught throughout the state of Alaska. As many Aleut have moved out of the islands to other parts of the state, they have taken with them the knowledge of their arts. They have also adopted new materials and methods for their art, including serigraphy, video art, and installation art.

Aleut carving, distinct in each region, has attracted traders for centuries, including early Europeans and other Alaska Natives. Historically, carving was a male art and leadership attribute whereas today it is done by both genders. Most commonly the carvings of walrus ivory and driftwood originated as part of making hunting weapons. Sculptural carvings depict local animals, such as seals and whales. Aleut sculptors also have carved human figures.

Aleuts also carve walrus ivory for other uses, such as jewelry and sewing needles. Jewelry is made with designs specific to the region of each people. Each clan would have a specific style to signify their origin. Jewelry ornaments were made for piercing lips (labrum), nose, and ears, as well as for necklaces. Each woman had her own sewing needles, which she made, and that often had detailed end of animal heads.

The main Aleut method of basketry was false embroidery (overlay). Strands of grasses or reeds were overlaid upon the basic weaving surface, to obtain a plastic effect. Basketry was an art reserved for women. Early Aleut women created baskets and woven mats of exceptional technical quality, using only their thumbnail, grown long and then sharpened, as a tool. Today, Aleut weavers continue to produce woven grass pieces of a remarkable cloth-like texture, works of modern art with roots in ancient tradition. Birch bark, puffin feathers, and baleen are also commonly used by the Aleuts in basketry. The Aleut term for grass basket is qiigam aygaaxsii. One Aleut leader recognized by the State of Alaska for her work in teaching and reviving Aleut basketry was Anfesia Shapsnikoff. Her life and accomplishments are portrayed in the book Moments Rightly Placed (1998).

Masks were created to portray figures of their myths and oral history. The Atka people believed that another people lived in their land before them. They portrayed such ancients in their masks, which show anthropomorphic creatures named in their language. Knut Bergsland says their word means "like those found in caves." Masks were generally carved from wood and were decorated with paints made from berries or other natural products. Feathers were inserted into holes carved out for extra decoration. These masks were used in ceremonies ranging from dances to praises, each with its own meaning and purpose.

=== Tattoos and piercings ===
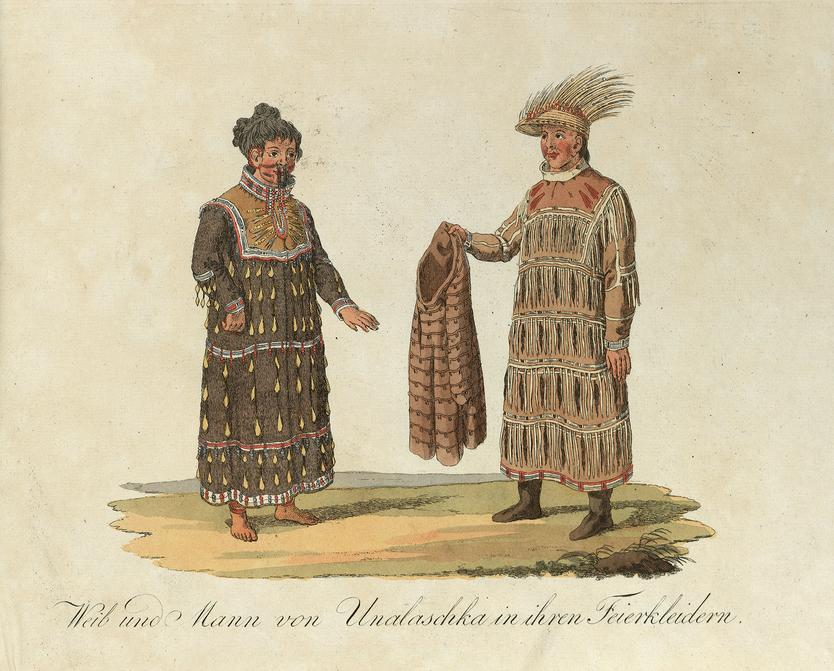
Tattooed Aleut woman

The tattoos and piercings of the Aleuts demonstrated accomplishments as well as their religious views. They believed their body art would please the spirits of the animals and make any evil go away. The body orifices were believed to be pathways for the entry of evil entities. By piercing their orifices: the nose, the mouth, and ears, they would stop evil entities, khoughkh, from entering their bodies. Body art also enhanced their beauty, social status, and spiritual authority.

Before the 19th century, piercings and tattoos were very common among Aleuts, especially among women. Piercings, such as the nose pin, were common among both men and women and were usually performed a few days after birth. The ornament was made of various materials, a piece of bark or bone, or an eagle's feather shaft. From time to time, adult women decorated the nose pins by hanging pieces of amber and coral from strings on it; the semi-precious objects dangled down to their chins.

Piercing ears was also common. The Aleuts pierced holes around the rim of their ears with dentalium shells (tooth shells or tusk shells), bone, feathers, dried bird wings or skulls and/or amber. Materials associated with birds were important, as birds were considered to defend animals in the spirit world. A man would wear sea lion whiskers in his ears as a trophy of his expertise as a hunter. Worn for decorative reasons, and sometimes to signify social standing, reputation, and the age of the wearer, Aleuts would pierce their lower lips with walrus ivory and wear beads or bones. The individual with the most piercings held the highest respect.

Tattooing for women began when they reached physical maturity, after menstruation, at about age 20. Historically, men received their first tattoo after killing their first animal, an important rite of passage. Sometimes tattoos signaled social class. For example, the daughter of a wealthy, famous ancestor or father would work hard at her tattoos to show the accomplishments of that ancestor or father. They would sew, or prick, different designs on the chin, the side of the face, or under the nose. Outside of the Aleutian Islands, the practice of tattooing occurred in other North Pacific island cultures around Alaska and the Russian Far East, including among the natives of the Diomede Islands, Kodiak Island, the Kuril Islands, Nunivak Island, Nunivak Island, Sakhalin and St. Lawrence Island. It also occurred in South Pacific island cultures, including in places such as New Zealand, Samoa and Tahiti.

=== Aleut clothing ===
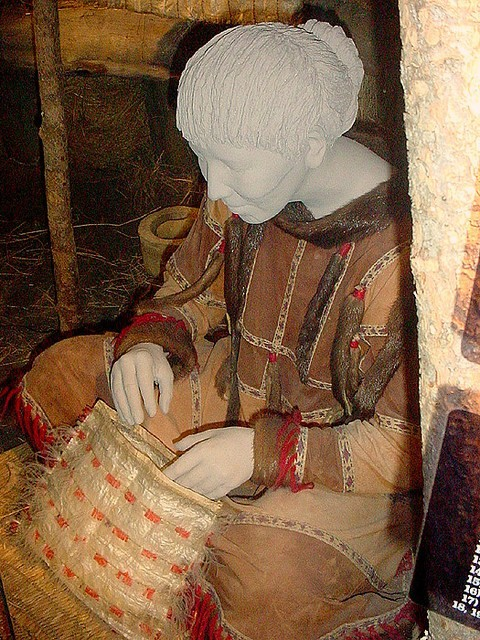
Replica of the sax, an Aleut coat made from bird skins and sea otter fur

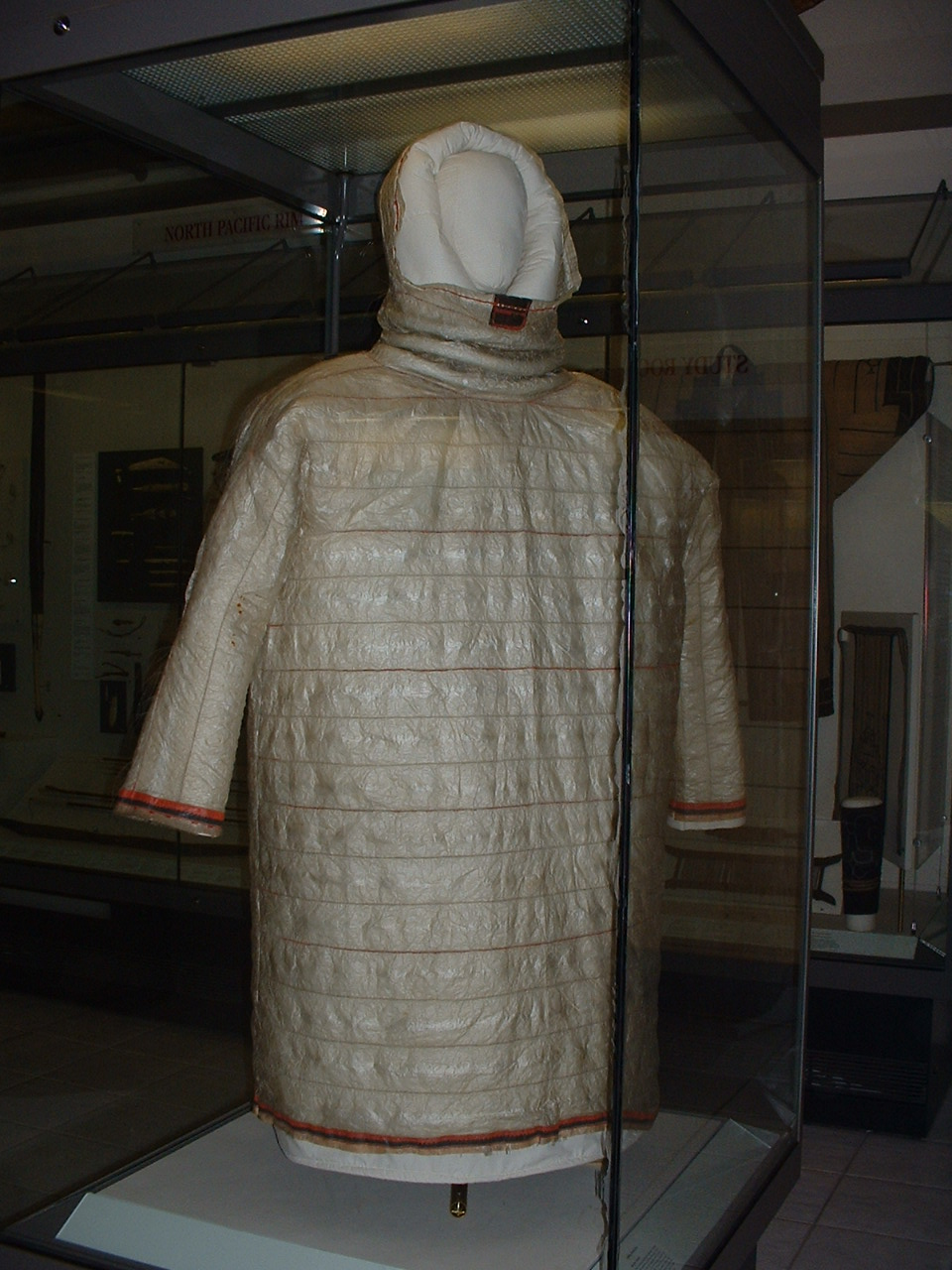
A Kamleika, or sea mammal intestine coat.

Aleuts developed in one of the harshest climates in the world, and learned to create and protect warmth. Both men and women wore parkas that extended below the knees. The women wore the skin of seal or sea-otter, and the men wore bird skin parkas, the feathers turned in or out depending on the weather. When the men were hunting on the water, they wore waterproof parkas made from seal or sea-lion guts, or the entrails of bear, walrus, or whales. Parkas had a hood that could be cinched, as could the wrist openings, so water could not get in. Men wore breeches made from the esophageal skin of seals. Children wore parkas made of downy eagle skin with tanned bird skin caps. They called these parkas kameikas, meaning 'rain gear' in the English language.

Sea-lions, harbor seals, and sea otters are the most abundant marine mammals. The men brought home the skins and prepared them by soaking them in urine and stretching them. The women undertook the sewing. Preparation of the gut for clothing involved several steps. The prepared intestines were turned inside out. A bone knife was used to remove the muscle tissue and fat from the walls of the intestine. The gut was cut and stretched, and fastened to stakes to dry. It was then cut and sewn to make waterproof parkas, bags, and other receptacles. On some hunting trips, the men would take several women with them. They would catch birds and prepare the carcasses and feathers for future use. They caught puffins (Lunda cirrhata, Fratercula corniculata), guillemots, and murres.

It took 40 skins of tufted puffin and 60 skins of horned puffin to make one parka. A woman would need a year for all the labor to make one parka. Each lasted two years with proper care. All parkas were decorated with bird feathers, beard bristles of seal and sea-lion, beaks of sea parrots, bird claws, sea otter fur, dyed leather, and caribou hair sewn in the seams.

Women made needles from the wing bones of seabirds. They made thread from the sinews of different animals and fish guts. A thin strip of seal intestine could also be used, twisted to form a thread. The women grew their thumbnail extra long and sharpened it. They could split threads to make them as fine as a hair. They used vermilion paint, hematite, the ink bag of the octopus, and the root of a kind of grass or vine to color the threads.

=== Gender ===
Russian travelers making early contact with the Aleuts mention traditional tales of two-spirits or third and fourth gender people, known as ayagigux̂ (male-bodied, 'man transformed into a woman') and tayagigux̂ (female-bodied, 'woman transformed into a man'), but it is unclear whether these tales are about historical individuals or spirits.

=== Hunting technologies ===
==== Boats ====
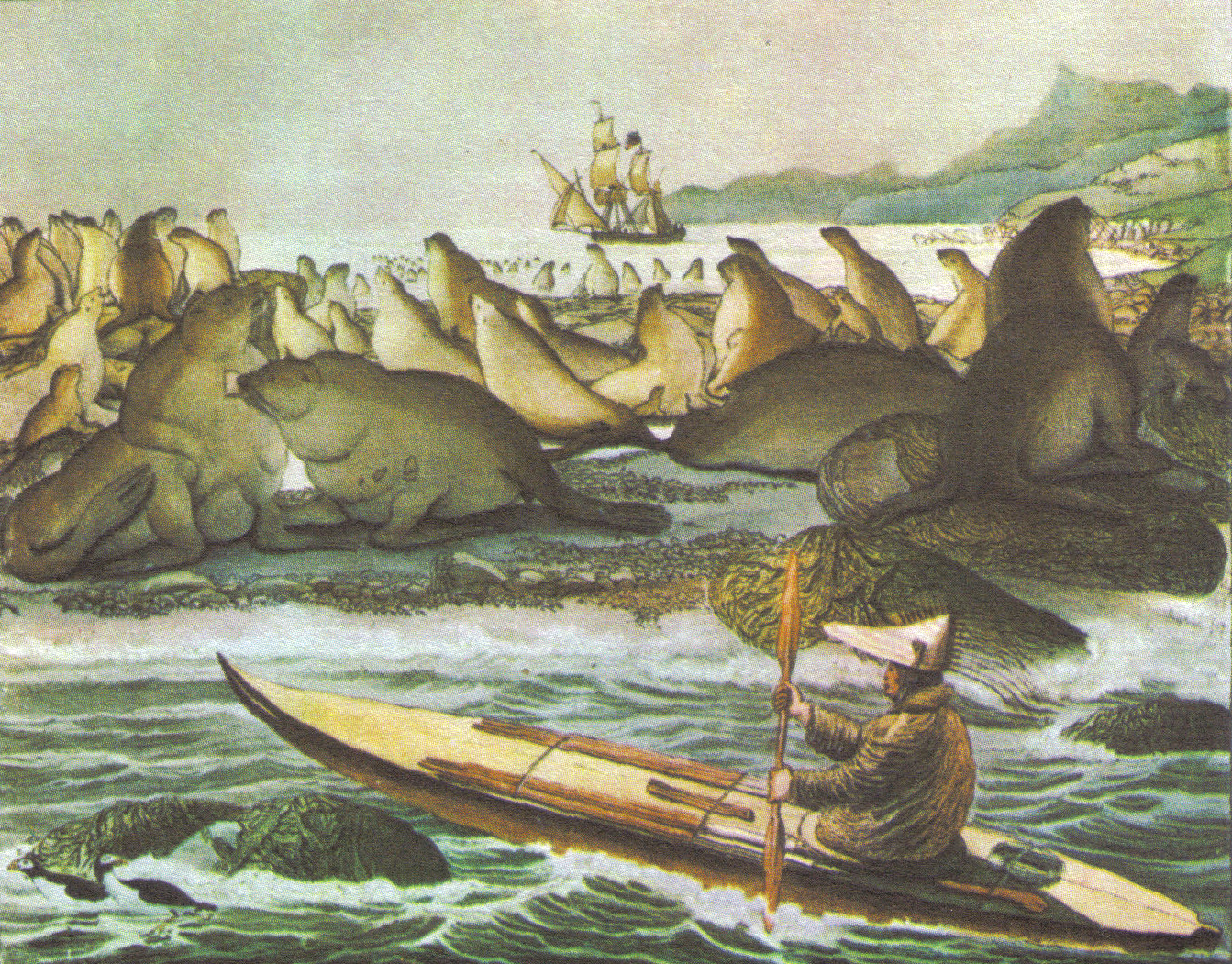
Illustration of an Aleut paddling a baidarka, with an anchored Russian ship in the background, near Saint Paul Island, by Louis Choris, 1817

The interior regions of the rough, mountainous Aleutian Islands provided little in terms of natural resources for the Aleutian people. They collected stones for weapons, tools, stoves or lamps. They collected and dried grasses for their woven baskets. For everything else, the Aleuts had learned to use the fish and mammals they caught and processed to satisfy their needs.

To hunt sea mammals and to travel between islands, the Aleuts became experts of sailing and navigation. While hunting, they used small watercraft called baidarkas. For regular travel, they used their large baidaras.

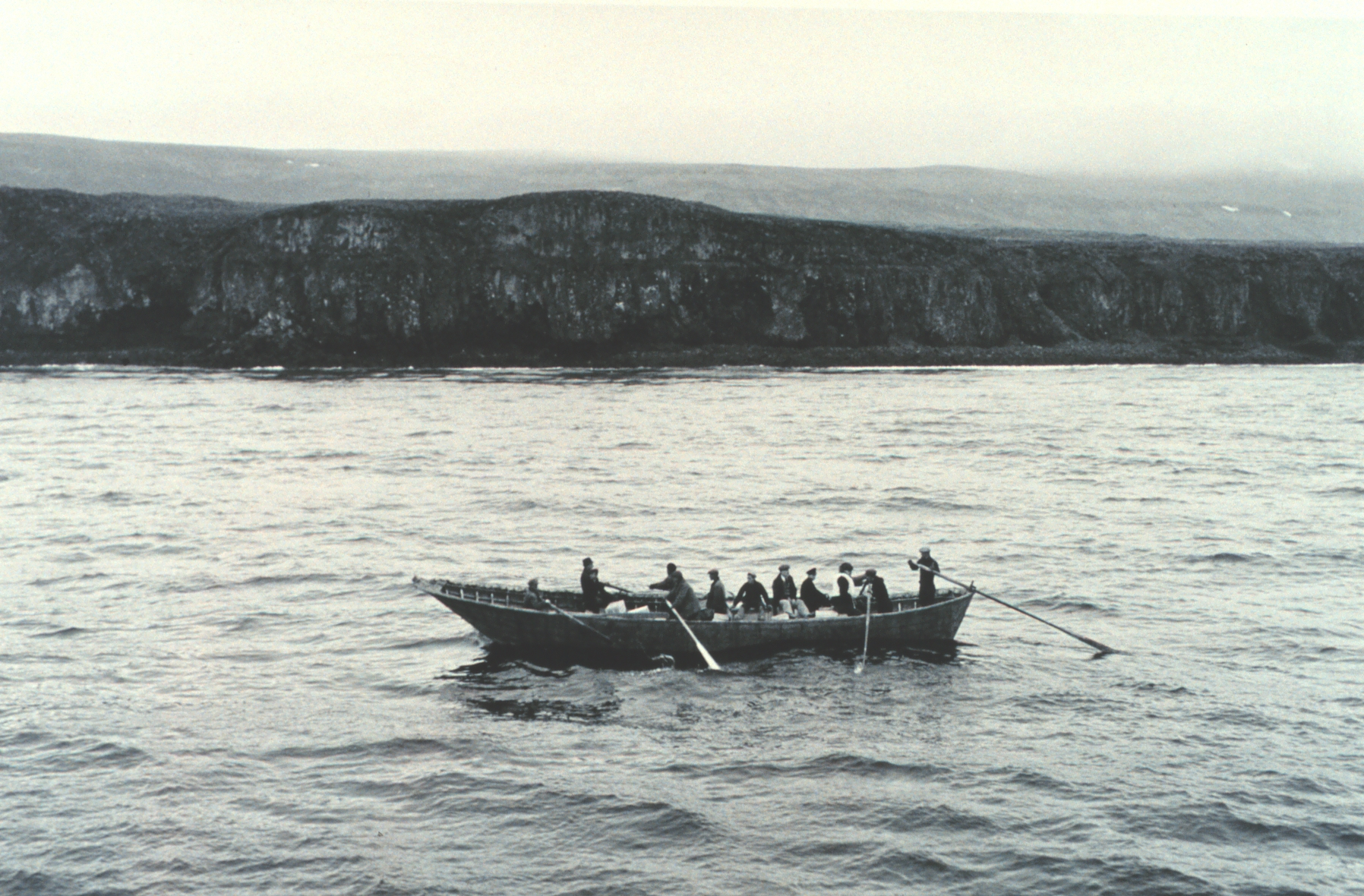
Men rowing a baidara (large skin boat)

The baidara was a large, open, walrus-skin-covered boat. Aleut families used it when traveling among the islands. It was also used to transport goods for trade, and warriors took them to battle.

The baidarka (small skin boat) was a small boat covered in sea lion skin. It was developed and used for hunting because of its sturdiness and maneuverability. Aleut baidarka resembles that of a Yup'ik kayak, but it is hydrodynamically sleeker and faster. They made the baidarka for one or two persons only. The deck was made with a sturdy chamber, the sides of the craft were nearly vertical and the bottom was rounded. Most one-man baidarkas were about 16 feet (4.9 m) long and 20 inches (51 cm) wide, whereas a two-man was on average about 20 feet (6.1 m) long and 24 inches (61 cm) wide. It was from the baidarka that Aleut men would stand on the water to hunt from the sea.

==== Weapons ====
The Aleuts hunted small sea mammals with barbed darts and harpoons slung from throwing boards. These boards gave precision as well as some extra distance to these weapons.

Harpoons were also called throwing-arrows when the pointed head fit loosely into the socket of the foreshaft and the head was able to detach from the harpoon when it penetrated an animal, and remain in the wound. There were three main kinds of harpoon that the Aleuts used: a simple harpoon, with a head that kept its original position in the animal after striking, a compound (toggle-head) harpoon in which the head took a horizontal position in the animal after penetration, and the throwing-lance used to kill large animals.

The simple Aleut harpoon consisted of four main parts: the wooden shaft, the bone foreshaft, and the bonehead (tip) with barbs pointed backward. The barbed head was loosely fitted into the socket of the foreshaft so that when the animal was stabbed, it pulled the head away from the rest of the harpoon. The sharp barbs penetrated with ease, but could not be pulled out. The bone tip is fastened to a length of braided twine meanwhile; the hunter held the other end of the twine in his hand.

The compound harpoon was the most prevalent weapon of the Aleuts. Also known as the toggle-head spear, it was about the same size as the simple harpoon and used to hunt the same animals, however, this harpoon provided a more efficient and lethal weapon. This harpoon separated into four parts. The longest part was the shaft with the thicker stalk closer to the tip of the harpoon. The shaft was fitted into the socket of the fore shaft and a bone ring was then placed over the joint to hold the two pieces together, as well as, protecting the wooden shaft from splitting. Connected to the fore shaft of the harpoon is the toggle head spear tip. This tip was made of two sub shafts that break apart on impact with an animal. The upper sub shaft held the razor stone head and attached to the lower sub shaft with a small braided twine loop. Once the tip penetrates the animal the upper sub head broke off from the rest of the shaft, however, since it was still connected with the braided loop it rotated the head into a horizontal position inside the animal's body so that it could not get away from the hunter.

The throwing lance may be distinguished from a harpoon because all its pieces are fixed and immovable. A lance was a weapon of war and it was also used to kill large marine animals after it has already been harpooned. The throwing lance usually consisted of three parts: a wooden shaft, a bone ring or belt, and the compound head that was made with a barbed bonehead and a stone tip. The length of the compound head was equivalent to the distance between the planes of a man's chest to his back. The lance would penetrate the chest and pass through the chest cavity and exit from the back. The bone ring was designed to break after impact so that the shaft could be used again for another kill.

=== Burial practices ===
They buried their dead ancestors near the village. Archeologists have found many different types of burials, dating from a variety of periods, in the Aleutian Islands. Aleuts developed burial styles that were accommodated to local conditions, and honored the dead. They have had four main types of burials: umqan, cave, above-ground sarcophagi, and burials connected to communal houses.

Umqan burials are the most widely known type of mortuary practice found in the Aleutian Islands. The people created burial mounds, that tend to be located on the edge of a bluff. They placed stone and earth over the mound to protect and mark it. Such mounds were first excavated by archeologists in 1972 on Southwestern Unmak Island, and dated to the early contact period. Researchers have found a prevalence of these umqan burials, and concluded it is a regional mortuary practice. It may be considered a pan-Aleutian mortuary practice.

Cave burials have been found throughout the eastern Aleutian Islands. The human remains are buried in shallow graves at the rear of the cave. These caves tend to be next to middens and near villages. Some grave goods have been found in the caves associated with such burials. For example, a deconstructed boat was found in a burial cave on Kanaga Island. There were no other major finds of grave goods in the vicinity.

Throughout the Aleutian Islands, gravesites have been found that are above-ground sarcophagi. These sarcophagi are left exposed, with no attempt to bury the dead in the ground. These burials tend to be isolated and limited to the remains of adult males, which may indicate a specific ritual practice. In the Near Islands, isolated graves have also been found with the remains, and not just the sarcophagus, left exposed on the surface. This way of erecting sarcophagi above ground is not as common as umqan and cave burials, but it is still widespread.

Another type of practice has been to bury remains in areas next to the communal houses of the settlement. Human remains are abundant in such sites. They indicate a pattern of burying the dead within the main activity areas of the settlement. These burials consist of small pits adjacent to the houses and scattered around them. In these instances, mass graves are common for women and children. This type of mortuary practice has been mainly found in the Near Islands.

In addition to these four main types, other kinds of burials have been found in the Aleutian Islands. These more isolated examples in include mummification, private burial houses, abandoned houses, etc. To date, such examples are not considered to be part of a larger, unifying cultural practice. The findings discussed represent only the sites that have been excavated.

The variety of mortuary practices mostly did not include the ritual of including extensive grave goods, as has been found in other cultures. The remains so far have been mainly found with other human and faunal remains. The addition of objects to "accompany" the dead is rare. Archaeologists have been trying to dissect the absence of grave goods, but their findings have been ambiguous and do not really help the academic community to understand these practices more.

Not much information is known about the ritual parts of burying the dead. Archeologists and anthropologists have not found much evidence related to burial rituals. This lack of ritual evidence could hint at either no ritualized ceremony, or one that has not yet been revealed in the archaeological record. As a result, archaeologists cannot decipher the context to understand exactly why a certain type of burial was used in particular cases.

=== Relation to non-Alaskan cultures ===
Aleuts have varying links to the Ainu people, who are native to Japan's Hokkaido and Russia's Kuril Islands and Sakhalin. In the 21st century, contacts between Ainu and Aleut communities have formed part of a wider pattern of Indigenous exchange around the North Pacific. Ainu activist Ryōko Tahara visited Unalaska in 2019 to meet with Aleut people, describing the encounter in the context of shared experiences of displacement and Indigenous cultural survival. Earlier connections are also discussed by author Chisato Dubreuil, who notes oral traditions and other evidence suggesting contacts between Ainu, Aleut and Tlingit peoples across the North Pacific. Dubreuil identifies the Aleutian Islands as a possible route for east–west Indigenous travel and states that Ainu and Aleut people were forced by Russian authorities to hunt sea otters together in the Kuril Islands during the 18th century, while presenting the possibility of earlier contact as a subject of continuing inquiry. Geographically, the Aleutian Islands and the Kuril Islands are often grouped together, since they are both long, volcanic island arcs in the subarctic North Pacific, with both also being prone to earthquakes.

The geographical and cultural classification of the Aleut intersects with a broader debate over the boundaries of Pacific island history. Although the Aleut are commonly discussed within Alaskan and subarctic contexts, the Aleutian Islands extend nearly 2,000 kilometers into the North Pacific, and their history has involved extensive movement, exchange and interaction across the Bering and North Pacific regions. Some historians have argued that the concept of Pacific island history can be extended to the Indigenous history of the North Pacific, including Alaska and the Russian Far East, emphasizing similarities with Pacific historiography such as ocean-oriented societies, Indigenous mobility, colonial encounters and interconnected maritime spaces. Others have noted that the geographic boundaries of "the Pacific" are constructed differently within historical scholarship, meaning some insular societies are included, while others, such as the Philippines, Indonesia or Australia, may be treated separately.

== Notable Aleuts ==
- John Hoover (1919–2011), sculptor
- Carl E. Moses (1929–2014) businessman, state representative, who served from 1965 to 1973 as both a Republican and Democrat,
- Jacob Netsvetov (1802–1864), Russian Orthodox saint and priest
- Sergie Sovoroff (1901–1989), educator, iqya-x (model sea kayak) builder
- Eve Tuck, academic, Indigenous studies
- Peter the Aleut (1800–1815), Eastern Orthodox Saint and martyr

== In popular culture ==
In Snow Crash, a science fiction novel by American writer Neal Stephenson, a central antagonist named Dmitri Ravinoff, better known as Raven, is portrayed as an Aleut with incredible toughness and hunting skill. The story is about revenge due in part to perceived mistreatment of the Aleuts. In the book Island of the Blue Dolphins by American writer Scott O'Dell, Aleuts attack a tribe of Native Americans that live on a small island off the coast of California.

== See also ==
- Adamagan
- Aleutian Islands
- Aleutian tradition
- Alutiiq
- Indigenous Amerindian genetics
- Maritime fur trade
- Sadlermiut
- Shamanism among Alaska Natives
- Unangan Aleut
- List of Native American peoples in the United States
