= Western Hemisphere =

Half of Earth west of the Prime Meridian

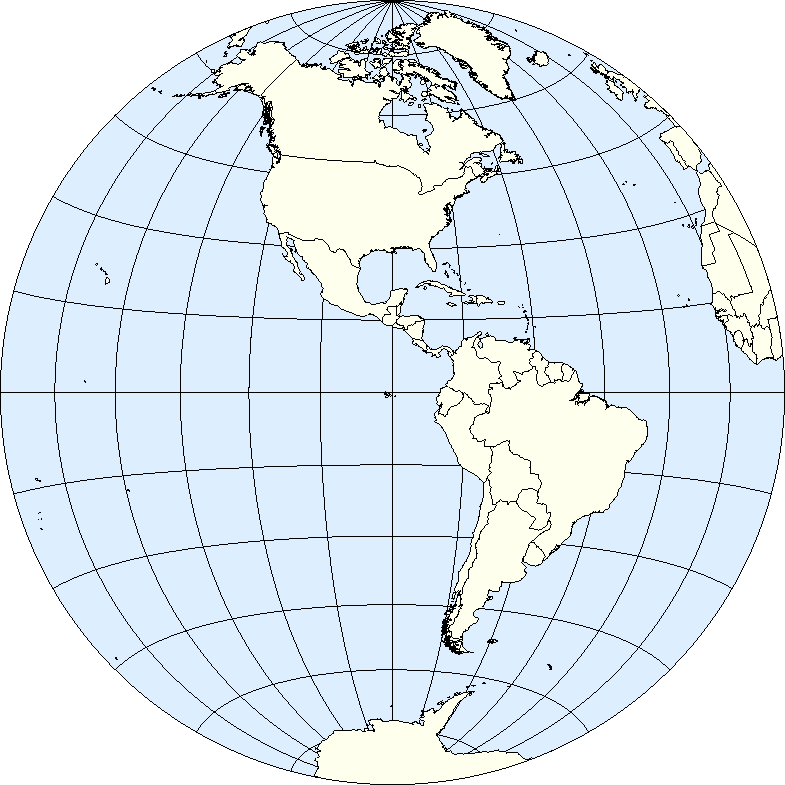
Map of the Western Hemisphere

The Western Hemisphere is the half of the planet Earth that lies west of the Prime Meridian and east of the 180th meridian. The other half is called the Eastern Hemisphere. In the United States, the term "Western Hemisphere" is often used as a metonym for the Americas, even though geographically, the hemisphere also includes parts of other continents.

== Geography ==
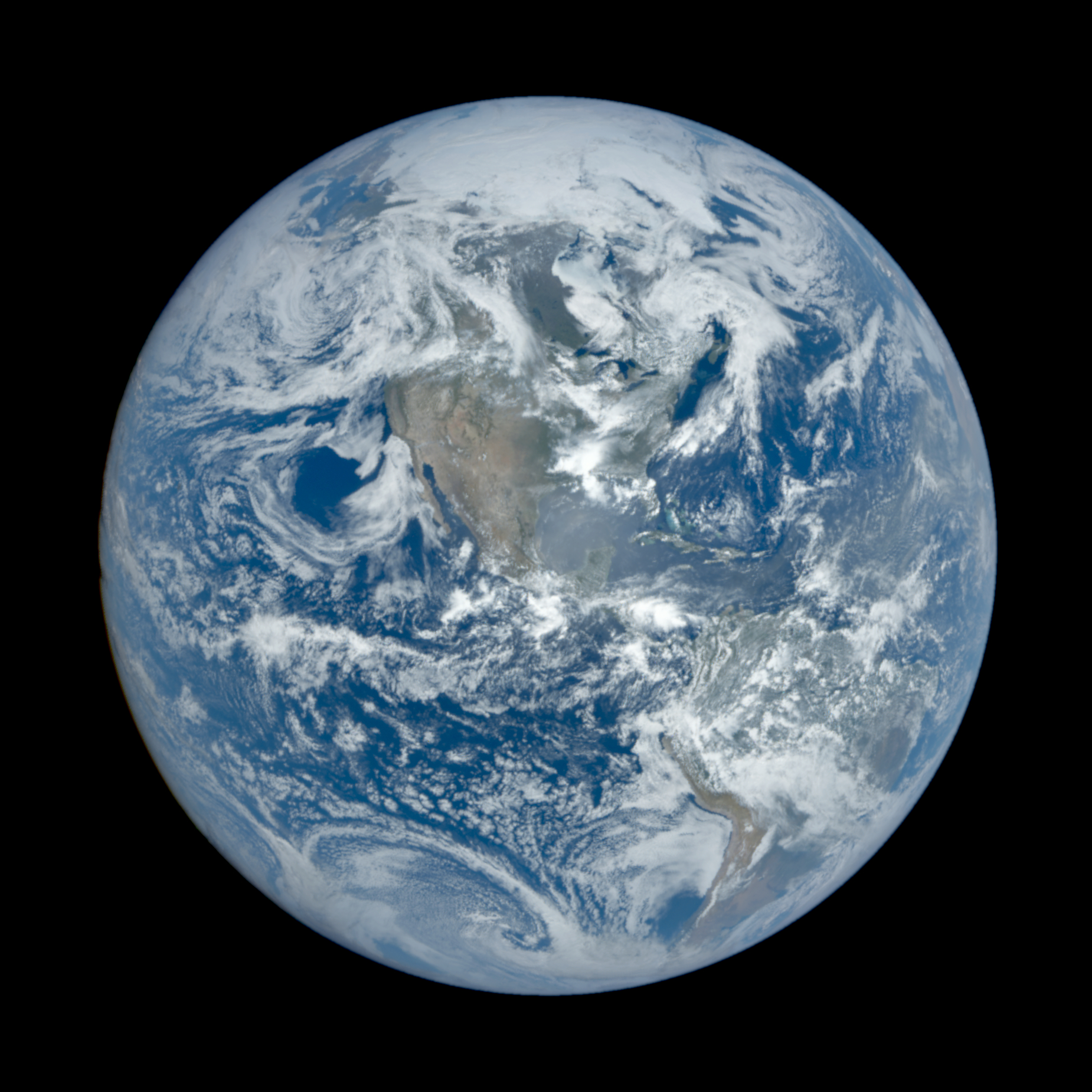
The Western Hemisphere in a photo taken from Deep Space Climate Observatory in June 2022

The Western Hemisphere comprises the Americas, except some of the Aleutian Islands to the southwest of the Alaskan mainland; the westernmost parts of Europe and Africa, both mainland and islands; the extreme eastern tip of the Russian mainland and islands (North Asia); many territories in Oceania; and a large part of Antarctica.

The center of the Western Hemisphere on the surface of the Earth is in the Pacific Ocean, at the intersection of the 90th meridian west and the Equator, among the Galápagos Islands. The nearest land is Genovesa Island at 0°19′N 89°57′W.

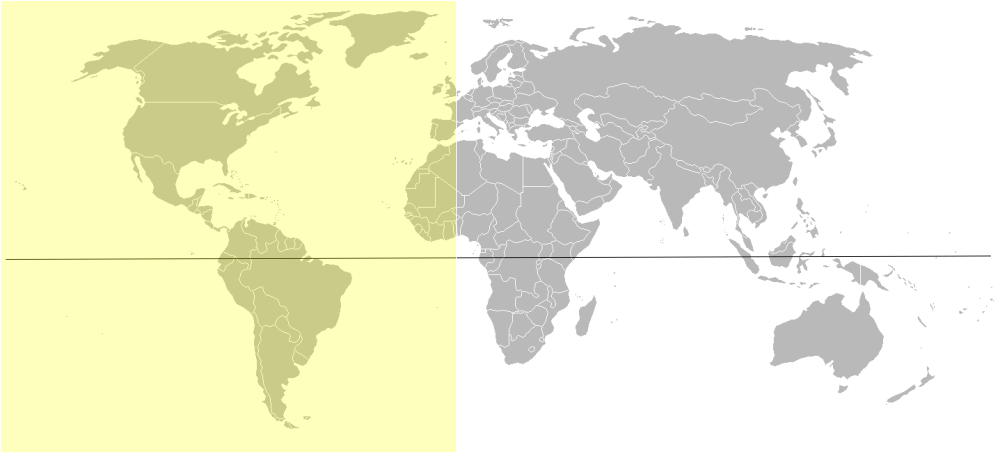
Countries in the Western Hemisphere, west of the prime meridian (shown in yellow).

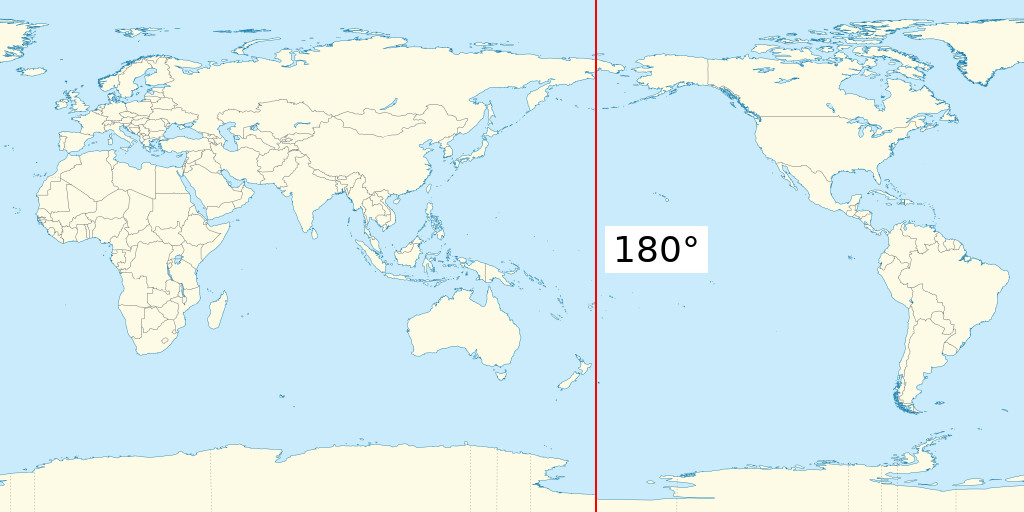
The 180th meridian on a Pacific-centered map of Earth.

The largest country entirely in the Western Hemisphere is Canada at 9,984,670 km^{2}. Fifteen independent countries entirely in the Western Hemisphere have no land borders to other countries: Antigua and Barbuda, the Bahamas, Barbados, Cape Verde, Cuba, Dominica, Grenada, Iceland, Jamaica, Saint Kitts and Nevis, Saint Lucia, Saint Vincent and the Grenadines, Samoa, Tonga and Trinidad and Tobago. Various other island entities in the Western Hemisphere are semi-independent territories of countries, while the Dominican Republic, Ireland and Haiti are considered divided island countries, due to having land borders. Ten of Africa's 54 independent countries are entirely in the Western Hemisphere: the largest is Mauritania at 1,030,000 km^{2}. Five African countries are partially in the Western Hemisphere. Three of Europe's 44 independent countries are entirely in the Western Hemisphere, while seven are partially in it. Portugal is the only mainland European country entirely in the Western Hemisphere, and Spain has the most mainland European land in the Western Hemisphere. However, a moderate proportion of Spain's population still live in the Eastern Hemisphere, since the major city of Barcelona is part of the small part of Spain east of the prime meridian. While the Polynesian countries of Samoa and Tonga are part of the Western Hemisphere, no countries from the neighboring regions of Melanesia and Micronesia are entirely in the Western Hemisphere.

11 countries in the Western Hemisphere are fully or partially in the Southern Hemisphere; Argentina, Bolivia, Brazil, Chile, Colombia, Ecuador, Paraguay, Peru, Samoa, Tonga and Uruguay. Fiji and New Zealand are in the Southern Hemisphere and also have some land in the Western Hemisphere, but the majority of their total land area and population is concentrated in the Eastern Hemisphere, with only small offshore islands of New Zealand crossing over into the Western Hemisphere. The Micronesian country Kiribati has land in all four hemispheres, and the country's population is concentrated in the Eastern Hemisphere and Northern Hemisphere. Countries in both the Southern Hemisphere and Western Hemisphere are rarer than countries in both the Southern Hemisphere and Eastern Hemisphere. If countries with overseas territories like France are excluded, than there are only 14 countries in both the Southern Hemisphere and Western Hemisphere, compared to 37 countries in both the Southern Hemisphere and Eastern Hemisphere. However, these two different combinations are still less common than countries in both the Northern Hemisphere and Western Hemisphere, or Northern Hemisphere and Eastern Hemisphere.

The highest mountain in the Western Hemisphere is Aconcagua, in the Andes of Argentina, at 6,960.8 metres (22,837 feet). The largest sand sea in the Americas is the Nebraska Sands Hills in the United States, which covers approximately 57,000 km². The largest sand sea in the entire Western Hemisphere is the Erg Chech in Mauritania, covering approximately 206,000 km².

The tallest freestanding structure in the Western Hemisphere is the CN Tower, in Toronto, at 553.3 metres (1,815 ft). The tallest building in the Western Hemisphere is One World Trade Center, in New York City, at 1,776 feet (541.3 m).

=== Other definitions ===
The inclusion of parts of non-American areas such as Western Europe is controversial among some, since it conflicts with constructs of the Western Hemisphere which correlate it with the New World or the Americas. Under the accepted geographical definition, historical events such as The Great Fire of London (51.51°N 0.09°W) are considered to have occurred in the Western Hemisphere, despite not being events associated with the history of the Americas and the New World. Similarly, facts such as Brazil being the last country to abolish slavery in the Western Hemisphere are not technically valid under the geographical definition of the Western Hemisphere, as slavery continued in the Western Hemisphere in non-American areas, with Mauritiana being the last country in the world to abolish slavery in 1981. In an attempt to match the Western Hemisphere more closely with the Americas, some sources use the 20th meridian west and the diametrically opposed 160th meridian east to define the hemisphere. This definition excludes all of the European and African mainlands, but still includes some islands associated with these continents, more of eastern Russia and Oceania, and part of Antarctica. It includes all islands of Alaska, but excludes a small portion of northeast Greenland. There is no hemisphere that includes all of the Americas that also excludes all land outside the Americas, regardless of the meridians or points chosen to define it.

== Temperature records ==
The majority of Antarctica's lowest recorded temperatures have been recorded in the larger Eastern Hemisphere portion. Outside of Antarctica, the lowest temperature ever recorded in the Western Hemisphere was a −69.6 °C (−93.3 °F) reading at the Klinck Automatic Weather Station in Greenland on December 22, 1991. This is also the lowest temperature ever recorded in the Northern Hemisphere. Byrd Automatic Weather Station is situated in the Western Hemisphere portion of Antarctica and recorded a −64.4 °C (−83.9 °F) reading on July 18, 1985. The lowest temperature ever recorded in the Eastern Hemisphere and the Southern Hemisphere was a −89.2 °C (−128.6 °F) reading at Antarctica's Vostok Station on July 21, 1983. This is also the lowest temperature ever recorded on earth.

The 56.7 °C (134 °F) temperature recorded in Death Valley, California on July 10, 1913 is the highest temperature ever recorded in the Northern Hemisphere and Western Hemisphere. It is also the highest temperature ever recorded on earth. A 55.0 °C (131 °F) temperature recorded in Kebili, Tunisia, on July 7, 1931 is the second highest temperature ever recorded on earth, and the highest in the Eastern Hemisphere. However, some weather historians question its accuracy. A 1922 reading of 58 °C (136.4 °F) in El Azizia, Libya, was long cited as the world record before the World Meteorological Organization decertified it in 2012 due to measurement errors. The Southern Hemisphere's highest recorded temperature is tied at 50.7 °C (123.3 °F) between Oodnadatta, South Australia on January 2, 1960 and Onslow, Western Australia on January 13, 2022.

Rivadavia, Argentina recorded South America's highest ever temperature of 48.9 °C (120 °F) on December 11, 1905. Seymour Island is situated off the coast of Antarctica's Western Hemisphere portion, and recorded a temperature of 20.75 °C (69.35 °F) on February 9, 2020, the highest associated with the Antarctica region.

== Human history ==
Morocco has some of the earliest evidence of habitation by modern forms of humans, dating back to 315,000 years ago. Some areas in West Africa like Ivory Coast and Senegal are believed to have had settlements from modern forms of humans dating to 150,000 years ago. Modern humans reached Portugal, Spain and Great Britain roughly 43,000 years ago, with Ireland being reached 10,000 years ago. The Americas were settled by humans roughly 15,000 years ago. Iceland and the Faroe Islands were settled over 1,000 years ago. Samoa and Tonga were settled 3,000 years ago, although other areas in Polynesia like Easter Island and Hawaii were settled under 1,000 years ago. Some areas in the Western Hemisphere were uninhabited by humans before the Age of Discovery, including Ascension Island, Baker Island, Cape Verde, the Cayman Islands, Clipperton Island, Cocos Island, the Desventuradas Islands, the Falkland Islands, Fernando de Noronha, the Galápagos Islands, Guadalupe Island, Howland Island, Jarvis Island, Johnston Atoll, the Juan Fernández Islands, Kingman Reef, Malpelo Island, Midway Atoll, Palmyra Atoll, the Revillagigedo Islands, Saint Helena, South Georgia and the South Sandwich Islands, Trindade and Martim Vaz and Tristan da Cunha. The part of Antarctica in the Western Hemisphere was also uninhabited before the Age of Discovery.

=== Early Western Hemisphere civilizations ===
The Caral-Supe civilization in Peru (founded between approximately 1500 and 1800 BC) is recognized as the oldest center of civilization in the Americas. Some of the oldest continuously inhabited settlements in the Western Hemisphere are Cusco in Peru (dating to 1000 BC and recognized as the oldest continuously inhabited city in the Americas), and Cádiz in southwestern Spain, dating to 1100 BC and recognized as one of the oldest continuously inhabited cities in Western Europe. Djenné-Jeno in present-day Mali is west of the prime meridian, and was inhabited from approximately 250 BC, making it one of the oldest urban settlements in sub-Saharan Africa. Several ancient settlements in present-day Morocco predate Djenné-Jeno, notably Oued Beht (2900–3400 BC) and Kach Kouch (600–2200 BC). Later historic African cities west of the prime meridian include Timbuktu, which became a major trans-Saharan trading and Islamic scholarly center, while North America's Cahokia was a major pre-Columbian urban settlement that flourished between approximately 1050 to 1150–1200 AD. While Cádiz is famous as one of the oldest continuously inhabited cities in Western Europe, older settlements west of the prime meridian existed across parts of Spain and the United Kingdom. These include Skara Brae in Orkney, Scotland, built around 3100 BC and Los Millares in Almería, dating back to roughly 3200 BC. Portugal's Lisbon has Neolithic roots and a Phoenician trading post dating to roughly 1200 BC, though historians generally regard Cádiz as the older continuous urban center.

== Environment ==
=== Flora and fauna ===
In the fauna of the Americas, there are distinct evolutionary lineages that evolved in geographic isolation, particularly during the Cenozoic Era. Among the most distinct native mammals are the xenarthrans, an ancient group that includes anteaters, armadillos and sloths. These animals originated in South America and remain exclusive to the Americas today. Similarly, New World monkeys—such as capuchins, spider monkeys, and howler monkeys, form a distinct primate family that evolved separately from Old World monkeys in Afro-Eurasia. The entire hummingbird family, comprising over 300 species, exists naturally only in American countries, and they range from Alaska to the southern tip of Chile. New World vultures, including turkey vultures and the Andean and California condors, are evolutionarily distinct from Old World vultures.

Several Pacific islands adjacent to Latin America are noted for their high levels of endemism, such as Cocos Island, the Galápagos Islands, the Juan Fernández Islands and the Revillagigedo Islands. This is due not only to their isolated locations, but also since they weren't discovered by humans until the 16th century, with these islands having no evidence of prehistoric activity by either Polynesians or Indigenous peoples of the Americas. Animals which only occur on these islands include the Cocos anole, Cocos cuckoo, Cocos flycatcher, Cocos finch and Pacific least gecko on Cocos Island, the Galápagos carpenter bee, Galápagos cormorant, Galápagos finch, Galápagos fur seal, Galápagos hawk, Galápagos marine iguana, Galapagos penguin, Galápagos sea lion and Galápagos tortoise on the Galápagos Islands, the Juan Fernández firecrown hummingbird, Juan Fernandez tit-tyrant and Masafuera rayadito on the Juan Fernández Islands and the Clarion cricket, Clarion tree lizard, Clarion whip snake, Socorro dove, Socorro mockingbird, Socorro red-tailed hawk, Socorro tree lizard and Socorro wren on the Revillagigedo Islands. These islands also have high levels of endemism in their plant life. On the Juan Fernández Islands, 60% to 64% of the native vascular plant species are endemic, with Robinson Crusoe Island having the highest rate of plant endemism in the world.

Bald eagles, the national symbol of the United States, can on rare occasion be found in the Eastern Hemisphere towards the end of Alaska's Aleutian Islands chain, which stretches across the North Pacific Ocean. While penguins are nearly exclusive to Antarctic-influenced regions of the Southern Hemisphere, they are widely found in both the Eastern and Western Hemisphere. Similarly, polar bears, which are exclusive to Arctic-influenced regions of the Northern Hemisphere, can be found in both the Eastern and Western Hemisphere.

Western chimpanzees only occur in African countries west of the prime meridian, including Guinea, Guinea-Bissau, Ivory Coast, Liberia, Senegal and Sierra Leone, which are entirely west of the prime meridian, and Ghana and Mali, which are mostly west of it. Western chimpanzees have gone extinct in Benin, which is entirely east of the prime meridian, and Togo, which is mostly east of it. However, other chimpanzee species occur throughout the Eastern Hemisphere portion of Africa. The Guinea baboon is another primate native to Western Hemisphere African countries, occurring in The Gambia, Guinea, Guinea-Bissau, Mauritania, Sierra Leone and the part of Mali west of the prime meridian. Various animals such as giraffes, gorillas and zebras only occur in Africa's Eastern Hemisphere portion.

=== Geology ===
The land of the Western Hemisphere encompasses several major tectonic plates, and a number of smaller plates and plate-boundary systems. Bermuda, Canada, Greenland and most of Mexico and the United States are situated on the North American Plate. Some parts of Southern California like Los Angeles and San Diego are situated on the Pacific Plate, along with Mexico's Baja California Peninsula. Several U.S. possessions in the central Pacific are east of the 180th meridian and also on the Pacific Plate, including Baker Island, Hawaii, Howland Island, Jarvis Island, Johnston Atoll, Kingman Reef, Midway Atoll and Palmyra Atoll. Mexico's Revillagigedo Islands, including Socorro, San Benedicto and Clarion, are situated on the Pacific Plate and form a volcanic archipelago in the eastern Pacific. Further north is Mexico's volcanic Guadalupe Island, which is also situated on the Pacific Plate. Clipperton Island, an uninhabited French territory, is situated 1,080 kilometers off Mexico and lies near the boundary between the Pacific Plate and the Cocos Plate. Its volcanic origin is associated with the broader tectonic and volcanic processes of the region. The Eastern and Western Hemisphere portions of the Aleutian Islands both form the arc boundary where the North American Plate overrides the subducting Pacific Plate. Most of Central America and the Caribbean occupy the Caribbean Plate or lie along its boundaries with the North American, Cocos and South American plates. Cuba and the Cayman Islands are notable exceptions within the Greater Antilles, as they lie on the North American Plate, whereas Hispaniola, Puerto Rico, Jamaica and the Virgin Islands lie on the Caribbean Plate. The Lesser Antilles form a volcanic arc associated with the eastern boundary of the Caribbean Plate, where Atlantic oceanic lithosphere is subducted beneath the Caribbean region. The Central American country Guatemala lies across the boundary of the Caribbean Plate and the North American Plate. Most of South America is situated on the South American Plate. Along South America's western margin, the Nazca Plate is being subducted beneath the South American Plate, producing the Peru–Chile Trench, the Andes and one of the world's most active earthquake and volcanic zones. Aside from South America itself, the South American Plate is also associated with the South Atlantic islands of Ascension Island, the Falkland Islands, Fernando de Noronha and Trindade and Martim Vaz, with the Falkland Islands being situated in the Falkland Plateau tectonic boundary region.

Several islands in the Western Hemisphere are located on plates different to those of the countries which administer them. Costa Rica's Cocos Island is the only subaerial landmass of the Cocos Plate, with the remainder of the plate consisting almost entirely of oceanic crust beneath the eastern Pacific. Colombia's Malpelo Island was formerly classified as part of the Nazca Plate, but is now considered to be situated on its own plate known as the Malpelo Plate. The Galápagos Islands, politically part of Ecuador, are situated on the Nazca Plate near the complex triple junction region involving the Nazca, Cocos and Pacific plates; their volcanism is associated with a hotspot and the surrounding plate-boundary system. Isabela Island is the largest landmass on the Nazca Plate, and part of the Galápagos Islands; it straddles the equator, but is almost entirely in the Southern Hemisphere and Western Hemisphere, along with nearly all other islands in the archipelago. Easter Island, although politically part of Chile, is also situated on the Nazca Plate, along with Chile's uninhabited Desventuradas Islands and Salas y Gómez Island. Easter Island is close to the East Pacific Rise and the small Easter microplate, while the Galápagos Islands are close to the Galápagos microplate. The Juan Fernández Islands, likewise belonging to Chile, are volcanic islands on the Nazca Plate and form part of a volcanic chain produced as the plate has moved over a hotspot. By contrast, the Hawaiian Islands are situated in the interior of the Pacific Plate and form the youngest exposed part of the Hawaiian volcanic chain, produced as the Pacific Plate moves over the Hawaiian hotspot. French Polynesia, including the Society Islands, is likewise situated principally on the Pacific Plate and contains numerous volcanic island chains and atolls formed through hotspot and intraplate volcanic processes. Samoa and Tonga are both associated with the Pacific Plate, although Tonga also lies on the boundary with the Tonga Plate.

Ireland and the United Kingdom lie on the Eurasian Plate, while Spain and Portugal are associated with the smaller Iberian Plate. The Iberian Peninsula region is often regarded by geologists as its own microcontinent. Iceland straddles the Mid-Atlantic Ridge and consequently lies across the North American–Eurasian plate boundary. The Azores islands, which are Portuguese, are situated in the complex region where the North American, Eurasian and African Plates interact and where an Azores microplate or diffuse plate-boundary zone occurs. Madeira, another Portuguese island territory, lies on the African Plate, while the Canary Islands of Spain are also situated on the African Plate. Cape Verde, off the coast of West Africa, is similarly associated with the African Plate. The West African countries which fall wholly within the Western Hemisphere are situated on the African Plate, with northern Morocco also being geologically associated with the Iberian Plate. The United Kingdom's overseas territories Saint Helena and Tristan da Cunha are associated with the African Plate, despite being thousands of kilometers from Africa in the South Atlantic. The South Sandwich Islands, another British overseas territory in the South Atlantic, lie on the South Sandwich Plate, which itself is adjacent to the larger Scotia Plate. The neighboring South Georgia lies within the complex Scotia–South American tectonic boundary region. The small part of Russia in the Western Hemisphere is associated with the North American Plate and adjacent small plates and tectonic blocks.

=== Oceanography ===
==== Atlantic Ocean ====
The Atlantic waters of the Western Hemisphere encompass a broad range of oceanographic environments, extending from the Celtic and Irish seas and the western coasts of the Iberian Peninsula to the northwest African coast, the Gulf of Guinea and the coasts of the Americas. Around Ireland, the United Kingdom, Spain, and Portugal, a mix of tides, winds, and underwater slopes creates complex coastal currents. In the summer, strong winds push surface water away from the coasts of Spain and Portugal, pulling cold, nutrient-rich water up from the deep ocean. During colder months, these coastal currents reverse direction. Along Morocco, Mauritania, and Senegal, seasonal trade winds also push surface water away from the coast, allowing colder, nutrient-rich water from deeper in the ocean to rise toward the surface. This helps support abundant plankton and, in turn, large populations of fish, making Northwestern Africa a highly productive fishing region. Fishing is particularly vital to Mauritania's economy as most of the country is barren desert.

Across the ocean, the Atlantic coastlines of North and South America connect to opposite polar oceans. North America is strongly influenced by the Arctic, as the cold Labrador Current flows south from Greenland to meet warmer currents heading north. Heavy, freezing water formed in the far north sinks and flows south along the deep ocean floor. South America, by contrast, connects to the Antarctic. The icy Malvinas Current travels north along Argentina until it collides with the warm, southward-flowing Brazil Current. Extremely cold water from Antarctica also sinks and spreads northward beneath the surface.

The Caribbean Sea forms a semi-enclosed tropical extension of the western Atlantic, and is estimated to have more than 7,000 islands. Outside of the Caribbean, the Western Hemisphere portion of the Atlantic Ocean contains numerous other islands of varying sizes and origins. In the northwest Atlantic, Newfoundland and Cape Breton Island form major islands of the Canadian Atlantic coast, bordering the Gulf of St. Lawrence and the open North Atlantic. Further south, Manhattan is one of the world's most heavily urbanized islands, situated within New York Harbor at the mouth of the Hudson River, while nearby islands such as Governors Island, Liberty Island, and Ellis Island form part of the harbor landscape. Canada's Montreal is another highly urbanized island connected to the broader Atlantic basin.

When compared to the Pacific Ocean, isolated volcanic islands are less common in the Western Hemisphere portion of the Atlantic Ocean. Bermuda, about 1,030 kilometers east of North Carolina, is the exposed summit of a large volcanic seamount and is unusual among Atlantic islands for its extensive limestone and coral landscapes. Although well north of the Caribbean, its warm waters support extensive coral reefs, seagrass meadows and other subtropical habitats. Off the coast of Brazil, the volcanic Fernando de Noronha archipelago lies about 340 kilometers offshore and forms part of a submarine ridge; its protected waters support coral reefs, sea turtles, dolphins and abundant reef fish. The more remote Trindade and Martim Vaz lie near roughly 1,100 kilometers from the Brazilian mainland, and are among the most isolated islands in the South Atlantic. 33 kilometers from Brazil's Atlantic coast lies Ilha da Queimada Grande, an island commonly known as "Snake Island" due to its unusually large population of venomous snakes.

In the southwestern Atlantic, the Falkland Islands form a large archipelago about 480 kilometers from the South American mainland. The islands consist principally of East and West Falkland together with hundreds of smaller islands and islets, and their cool, windswept environment supports large populations of penguins, albatrosses, seals and other seabirds and marine mammals. The islands were the site of the 1982 Falklands War between Argentina and the islands' administrators the United Kingdom, with this war causing over 900 fatalities. The Falklands War is one of the most notable examples of warfare in harsh, colder environments, along with the Japanese invasion of the Aleutian Islands in World War II. Further into the South Atlantic are the volcanic islands of South Georgia and the South Sandwich Islands, Saint Helena, Ascension Island, and Tristan da Cunha. Collectively, these islands are characterized by their geographical isolation from major landmasses, with Tristan da Cunha being considered the most remote inhabited island on earth. The South Atlantic Norwegian territory Bouvet Island is often labelled as the most remote island on earth. It is just east of the prime meridian, with its geographical coordinates being 54°S 3°E. The United Nations geoscheme officially categorizes the island as part of South America, although it is closer to Antarctica and Africa.

==== Pacific Ocean ====
The Tropical Eastern Pacific bioregion is entirely in the Western Hemisphere. It ranges from the coasts of southern Mexico to northern Peru, and includes the waters of surrounding islands as far as Clipperton Island. The Tropical Eastern Pacific differs from the Indo-Pacific bioregion, which covers most of the tropical Pacific and Indian Ocean. The biological differences between the tropical zones of the eastern and western Pacific are often attributed to the Eastern Pacific Barrier (EPB), a term used to describe the thousands of kilometers of empty, island-less ocean between Polynesia and the coast of Latin America. The lack of stepping stone islands in this distance prevents many shallow-water Indo-Pacific marine species from entering the eastern Pacific, with it typically being easier for long distance species such as dolphins, sea turtles, sharks and whales to cross the barrier. The more remote islands of the Tropical Eastern Pacific, like Clipperton Island and the Galápagos Islands, tend to share stronger biogeographical affinities with the Indo-Pacific, particularly French Polynesia and Kiribati. The concept of the Eastern Pacific Barrier is not applicable to Chile and its coastal islands, or the Pacific coasts of the United States and Canada, as these countries sit outside of the tropical zone. The Pacific coasts of the contiguous United States, Alaska, Canada and northern Mexico are part of the same bioregion as other non-tropical regions on the opposite side of the North Pacific. This bioregion is known as the Temperate Northern Pacific, and aside from the Pacific coast of North America, also covers Eastern Hemisphere areas like the Japanese archipelago, northern China and Russia's Pacific coast (including the Commander Islands, Kuril Islands and Sakhalin Island). Hawaii and other central Pacific possessions of the United States fall within the Indo-Pacific bioregion, rather than the Temperate Northern Pacific.

The Bering Sea is the northernmost marginal sea of the Pacific Ocean, and is mostly in the Western Hemisphere. It is bordered by Alaska and far eastern Russia. The Bering Sea contains several continental and volcanic subarctic Alaskan islands, including Little Diomede Island, the volcanic Pribilof Islands, Nunivak, St. Matthew Island and St. Lawrence Island. The Bering Sea eventually leads to the narrow Bering Strait, where Pacific waters from the Bering Sea meet Arctic waters (via the Chukchi Sea, a marginal sea of the Arctic). Little Diomede Island and Russia's Big Diomede Island are both situated on the Bering Strait, and represent the northernmost islands within the Pacific Basin. St. Lawrence Island is the northernmost major island entirely within the Bering Sea, and it is the only island in the Pacific Basin which occasionally receives polar bears, along with the Diomedes. The Aleutian Islands are a volcanic arc which border the Bering Sea to the north, and the open North Pacific Ocean to the south. Unimak Island is one of the first islands of the chain and is more continental in character than the later islands. It is the only island in the chain to feature land mammals from mainland Alaksa, like brown bears and grey wolves. The Unimak Pass between Unimak Island and the Krenitzin Islands prevents these land mammals from naturally reaching the other islands of the Aleutian chain. While nearly all of the Aleutian islands do not naturally have any land mammals, arctic foxes were introduced by humans on certain islands. Some Aleutian islands extend nearly 2,000 kilometers from mainland Alaska, and are in the Eastern Hemisphere, with the Bering Sea surrounding these islands also being situated in the Eastern Hemisphere.

Other Alaskan islands in the Pacific and its marginal seas include the Kodiak Archipelago, which is adjacent to the Aleutian Islands, and the over 1,100 islands of the Alexander Archipelago in southeast Alaska. The Alaskan city of Sitka is located in the Alexander Archipelago, on Baranof Island, while the city of Ketchikan is located on Revillagigedo Island (not to be confused with Mexico's volcanic Revillagigedo Islands). The Pacific coast of Canada includes Vancouver Island and Haida Gwaii, formerly known by the colonial name of the Queen Charlotte Islands. The Pacific coast of the contiguous United States contains very few islands in the open ocean, with San Francisco's Farallon Islands and Southern California's Channel Islands being among the only ones. Contiguous U.S. Pacific islands outside of the open ocean include the San Juan Islands in Washington and Alcatraz Island in the San Francisco Bay. Mexico's Revillagigedo Islands are part of the Tropical Eastern Pacific bioregion, along with the continental Tres Marías Islands. Mexico's more northern islands do not fall within the Tropical Eastern Pacific region, including the volcanic Guadalupe Island and the Gulf of California islands. The Gulf of California includes Tiburón Island, the largest island of Mexico. Tiburón has a landscape influenced by the adjacent Sonoran Desert, and was a traditional home of the Seri people. It was also the site of the Tiburón Island Tragedy, where a group of U.S. gold expeditioners went missing, with some presumed cannibalized by the natives. Aside from the volcanic Desventuradas Islands, Easter Island, Juan Fernández Islands and Salas y Gómez Island, Chile's Pacific coast also includes many closer continental islands, with one of the most notable being Chiloé Island. Peru's Pacific coast contains no volcanic islands and few continental islands. The Chincha Islands, which were historically mined for guano, are among the most notable. Colombia's Pacific coast includes Gorgona Island and Malpelo Island, a volcanic island which is part of a protected marine sanctuary area. The Pacific coast of Central America includes the large Panamanian island Coiba Island, but this area is largely devoid of continental islands, and also has no volcanic islands other than Costa Rica's Cocos Island.

==== Arctic Ocean ====
The largest and most notable Arctic landmasses in the Western Hemisphere include Greenland, an autonomous territory within the Kingdom of Denmark, and Canada's Axel Heiberg Island, Baffin Island, Banks Island, Devon Island, Ellesmere Island, Prince of Wales Island, Southampton Island and Victoria Island. Greenland and the independent nation of Iceland are connected to both the Arctic and Atlantic oceans. Grímsey is Iceland's northernmost inhabited island, and the only inhabited part of the country which is technically north of the Arctic Circle.

The Eastern Hemisphere portion of the Arctic Ocean primarily consists of islands under Russian sovereignty, with the Svalbard archipelago also being under Norwegian sovereignty. One of Russia's Arctic islands, Wrangel Island, straddles the 180th meridian and therefore has land on both sides of the Eastern–Western Hemisphere boundary. The Norwegian Arctic island of Jan Mayen is entirely in the Western Hemisphere, although mainland Norway and all other Norwegian islands are in the Eastern Hemisphere.

The Indian Ocean is the only major ocean which is entirely in the Eastern Hemisphere, with no Western Hemisphere nations directly bordering it via their mainlands.

== Demographics, economy and geopolitics ==
82% of humans live in the Eastern Hemisphere, and 18% in the Western Hemisphere. The difference in population is less lopsided than that of the Northern Hemisphere and Southern Hemisphere, with 90% of humans living in the Northern Hemisphere, and only 10% in the Southern Hemisphere. In 2026, the states with the highest population density in the Western Hemisphere were Sint Maarten and Bermuda, which had respectively 1,291 people and 1,164 people per square kilometer. In 2026, the least densely populated states in the Western Hemisphere were Western Sahara (a disputed territory claimed by Morocco) and Greenland, which had 2 people and 0.3 people per square kilometer. Greenland was the least densely populated country or territory in the world in 2026. In 2025, the French overseas territory French Polynesia had the highest life expectancy for both males and females in the Western Hemisphere (81.9 years for males and 86.6 years for females). The combined median life expectancy for males and females in French Polynesia was 84.3 years in 2025. For independent countries mostly in the Western Hemisphere, Spain had the highest median life expectancy (84.0 years), while Ireland had the highest median life expectancy for countries entirely in the Western Hemisphere (83.1 years). In 2025, the African country Republic of Guinea had the lowest life expectancy for females in the Western Hemisphere (62.1 years). Guinea's life expectancy of 59.7 for males was also the lowest for countries which are entirely in the Western Hemisphere. The African country Burkina Faso, which is mostly in the Western Hemisphere, had a life expectancy of 59.1 for males, which was the lowest for any country with land in the Western Hemisphere. In 2008, Guinea-Bissau had a life expectancy of only 47 for males, and 49 for females. However, life expectancy for males and females improved to 61 and 66 by 2025.

In 2016, the top 25 most visited cities entirely in the Western Hemisphere were New York City, Los Angeles, Madrid, Miami, Dublin, Toronto, Lima, San Francisco, Vancouver, Lisbon, Mexico City, Punta Cana, São Paulo, Montreal, Washington, D.C., Chicago, Buenos Aires, Boston, Edinburgh, San Jose, Houston, Rio de Janeiro, Bogotá, Casablanca and Atlanta. In 2025, the United States had the highest GDP for countries mostly in the Western Hemisphere, and also had the overall highest in the world that year. Its GDP of $30 trillion was significantly more than China, which had a GDP of $19 trillion (the second highest in the world and highest among countries entirely in the Eastern Hemisphere). Germany and Japan, which are also entirely in the Eastern Hemisphere, had the third and fourth highest GDPs that year, while the United Kingdom had the fifth highest, and second highest for countries mostly in the Western Hemisphere. Canada had the tenth highest GDP in the world in 2025, and the highest for countries entirely in the Western Hemisphere, at $2.32 trillion. The Western Hemisphere state with the lowest GDP in 2025 was the British overseas territory of Montserrat. Tonga had the lowest GDP for independent countries entirely in the Western Hemisphere that year, while Kiribati had the lowest GDP for independent countries with land in the Western Hemisphere. Kiribati's GDP of $349 million was the fourth lowest in the world in 2025.

By death toll, the worst terrorist incident in the Western Hemisphere is the September 11 attacks, which occurred on the east coast of the United States in 2001, and caused 2,977 fatalities. While terrorist incidents have historically been concentrated in the Eastern Hemisphere, in recent times there has been a rise in Islamic extremism in the Sahel region of West Africa, including Burkina Faso and Mali, which both have land in the Western Hemisphere. The 2024 Barsalogho massacre occurred in the Western Hemisphere portion of Burkina Faso, and was tied to Al-Qaeda-affiliated Islamic extremists. Some estimates place the death toll at 600, making it one of the worst terrorist incidents in the Western Hemisphere after the September 11 attacks. Since the 2010s, other major terrorist incidents have occurred in Mali and neighboring Niger (which is entirely east of the prime meridian).

Countries in the Americas are members of various intergovernmental and regional organizations, including Association of Caribbean States (ACS), Community of Latin American and Caribbean States (CELAC), Mercosur, Organization of American States (OAS) and Pan American Health Organization (PAHO). Since 2023, Burkina Faso and Mali have been members of Alliance of Sahel States, along with Niger. All three of these countries acted in unison in removing the colonial language of French as an official language during the 2020s. Cape Verde, The Gambia, Ghana, Guinea, Guinea-Bissau, Ivory Coast, Liberia, Senegal and Sierra Leone are members of ECOWAS (Economic Community of West African States). ECOWAS also includes Togo, a country almost entirely in the Eastern Hemisphere, and Benin and Nigeria, which are entirely in the Eastern Hemisphere. The European Union includes Iceland, Ireland, Portugal and Spain, along with various European countries entirely or mostly in the Eastern Hemisphere, such as Austria, Belgium, Bulgaria, Croatia, Cyprus, the Czech Republic, Denmark, Estonia, France, Germany, Greece, Hungary, Italy, Latvia, Lithuania, Luxembourg, Malta, the Netherlands, Poland, Romania, Slovakia, Slovenia and Sweden. The United Kingdom was also a European Union member until January 31, 2020. The United Kingdom, the United States and Canada are also members of NATO (North Atlantic Treaty Organization), along with European Union countries, and certain European countries outside of the European Union. NATO is a defense organization which limits its membership to countries bordering the North Atlantic Ocean and its marginal seas, although NATO has never included any Latin American or African countries with a North Atlantic coast, or any Caribbean countries. Mauritania and Morocco are members of the Arab League, which also includes Algeria (a country primarily in the Eastern Hemisphere), as well as various Arab countries entirely in the Eastern Hemisphere, including Bahrain, Comoros, Djibouti, Egypt, Iraq, Jordan, Kuwait, Lebanon, Libya, Oman, Palestine, Qatar, Saudi Arabia, Somalia, Sudan, Syria, Tunisia, the United Arab Emirates and Yemen. Samoa and Tonga are members of the Pacific Islands Forum, whose other members are insular Pacific countries entirely or mostly in the Eastern Hemisphere, including Australia, Federated States of Micronesia, Fiji, Kiribati, Marshall Islands, Nauru, New Zealand, Palau, Papua New Guinea, Solomon Islands, Tuvalu and Vanuatu. The Pacific Islands Forum also includes several non-independent Polynesian territories which are entirely in the Western Hemisphere, like French Polynesia.

Asia-Pacific Economic Cooperation (APEC) is a regional organization for countries in the Americas and Asia which border the Pacific Ocean, also including the larger island countries of the Pacific. APEC members entirely or mostly in the Western Hemisphere include Canada, Chile, Mexico, Peru and the United States, with the other members being Australia, Brunei, China, Hong Kong, Indonesia, Japan, Malaysia, New Zealand, Papua New Guinea, Philippines, Russia, Singapore, South Korea, Taiwan, Thailand and Vietnam. Additionally, Australia, Brunei, Japan, New Zealand, Singapore and Vietnam are members of the free trade agreement the Comprehensive and Progressive Agreement for Trans-Pacific Partnership (CPTPP), with the CPTPP also having a Western Hemisphere presence through the membership of Canada, Chile, Mexico and Peru. The United Kingdom became a member of the CPTPP in 2024, despite only bordering the Atlantic Ocean. Argentina and Uruguay also only border the Atlantic Ocean, and have expressed interest in joining the CPTPP, which has less strict geographical requirements than APEC. Colombia, Costa Rica, Ecuador, El Salvador, Guatemala, Honduras, Nicaragua and Panama are not members of APEC or the CPTPP, despite being Pacific-facing countries in the Americas. Colombia, Costa Rica, Ecuador and Panama have expressed interest in joining APEC, with Colombia, Costa Rica and Ecuador having also expressed interest in joining the CPTPP, although APEC has had a freeze on new members since 1998. While not currently a member of APEC or the CPTPP, Colombia is part of the Pacific Alliance with Chile, Mexico and Peru, a regional trade bloc which also seeks to create stronger ties between Latin American Pacific countries and countries on the other side of the Pacific.

=== Currency ===
The currencies of the countries and territories in the Western Hemisphere are diverse, although several share currencies or use those issued elsewhere. In the Americas, the United States dollar (USD) is the official currency of the United States, Ecuador (including the Galápagos Islands) and El Salvador, and it circulates alongside the Panamanian balboa in Panama. Among other American countries, Brazil, Canada, Mexico, Argentina, Colombia, Chile, Peru, the Dominican Republic, Guatemala, Cuba, Costa Rica, Venezuela, Uruguay, Bolivia, Paraguay, Honduras, Trinidad and Tobago, Jamaica, Nicaragua, Guyana, Haiti, the Bahamas, Barbados, Suriname and Belize use their respective national currencies, including the Brazilian real, Canadian dollar, Mexican peso, Argentine peso, Colombian peso, Chilean peso, Peruvian sol, Dominican peso, Guatemalan quetzal, Cuban peso, Costa Rican colón, Venezuelan bolívar, Uruguayan peso, Bolivian boliviano, Paraguayan guaraní, Honduran lempira, Trinidad and Tobago dollar, Jamaican dollar, Nicaraguan córdoba, Guyanese dollar, Haitian gourde, Bahamian dollar, Barbadian dollar, Surinamese dollar and Belize dollar. Antigua and Barbuda, Dominica, Grenada, Saint Kitts and Nevis, Saint Lucia and Saint Vincent and the Grenadines share the Eastern Caribbean dollar. Among the European and African countries fully or partially in the Western Hemisphere, Spain, Portugal and Ireland use the euro, as does the small part of mainland France in the Western Hemisphere. Portuguese islands such as the Azores and Madeira also use the euro, while the United Kingdom uses the pound sterling (with the Falkland Islands, Saint Helena, Ascension Island, and Tristan da Cunha using variations of it). Iceland uses the Icelandic króna, Greenland the Danish krone, Morocco the Moroccan dirham and Algeria the Algerian dinar. Ivory Coast, Senegal, Mali, Burkina Faso, Guinea-Bissau and Togo use the West African CFA franc, while Ghana, Guinea, Mauritania, Sierra Leone, Liberia, Cape Verde and The Gambia use the Ghanaian cedi, Guinean franc, Mauritanian ouguiya, Sierra Leonean leone, Liberian dollar, Cape Verdean escudo and Gambian dalasi, respectively. The Russian ruble is used in Russia's Western Hemisphere portion, including Wrangel Island, while Norway's Jan Mayen uses the Norwegian krone.

In the Pacific, Kiribati uses the Australian dollar, Fiji the Fijian dollar, Samoa the Samoan tālā and Tonga the Tongan paʻanga. New Zealand's Chatham Islands and Kermadec Islands use the New Zealand dollar. These are the only parts of New Zealand proper in the Western Hemisphere. The semi-autonomous Polynesian states of Cook Islands, Niue and Tokelau are in the Western Hemisphere and politically part of New Zealand, also using the New Zealand dollar. The Pitcairn Islands in the Pacific are an overseas territory of the United Kingdom, but use the New Zealand dollar. French Polynesia and France's Wallis and Futuna use the CFP franc rather than the euro, and it is issued by the Institut d'émission d'outre-mer. France's uninhabited Clipperton Island is under the direct authority of the French Government, and if it had a human population, then it would theoretically use a French currency. From 1936 to 2007, it was administratively attached to French Oceania (later renamed French Polynesia), before the French government placed Clipperton under direct administration.

== Culture and language ==
=== Religion ===
The Western Hemisphere is a less religiously diverse region than the Eastern Hemisphere, and the vast majority of areas in the Western Hemisphere are majority Christian (including the whole of the Americas, Polynesian islands and the few European countries west of the prime meridian). The handful of West African nations lying entirely west of the prime meridian are mostly Muslim-majority countries. Liberia, a country founded by freed African American slaves, is the only one with a Christian-majority population. In 2024, the United States had the largest Jewish population in the Western Hemisphere, with over 6,300,000 (roughly 1.85% of the country's population). The country's Jewish population is the second largest in the world, behind only Israel, which had 7,153,000 Jews in 2024. Other Western Hemisphere countries ranked in the top 15 for Jewish populations are Canada (400,000), Argentina (170,000), Brazil (90,300) and Mexico (41,000). The United Kingdom has 313,000 Jews, and the majority of them reside in the Western Hemisphere parts of the country.

=== Spanish language ===
Spanish is the most common language in the Western Hemisphere, and is widely spoken across the Americas and the Caribbean, as well as in Spain itself. In the eastern Pacific, it is also spoken on Easter Island, which was originally inhabited by Polynesians but later annexed by Chile, in addition to being spoken by the populations living on the Galápagos Islands and the Juan Fernández Islands.

=== English language ===
English is the most common language in the United States, Canada, Ireland, Ascension Island, Bermuda, the Falkland Islands, Liberia, Pitcairn Islands, Saint Helena, Tristan da Cunha and many parts of the Caribbean, such as Jamaica, the Cayman Islands and the Virgin Islands. In Sierra Leone, English is the official administrative language, while Krio is the most spoken. English is a primary language in Ghana and the United Kingdom, which are mostly in the Western Hemisphere. It is also widely understood in Samoa and Tonga, which have their own distinct Polynesian languages.

=== French language ===
French is widely spoken in the Canadian province of Quebec and certain parts of the Caribbean, as well as French Guiana, Ivory Coast, French Polynesia and Wallis and Futuna. It is also spoken in mainland France (which is mostly in the Eastern Hemisphere). Wolof is the most widely spoken language in Senegal, although French is the official language.

=== Portuguese language ===
Portuguese is the main language in Brazil and Portugal. The official administrative language of Cape Verde is Portuguese, used in government, schools, and media. However, the true national spoken language is Cape Verdean Creole (Kriolu). Likewise, in Guinea-Bissau, Portuguese is the official language, but Guinea-Bissau Creole (Kriol) is the principal language. Unlike in the Western Hemisphere, Portuguese is the most common language in the Southern Hemisphere, partially due to Brazil's large population in comparison to the rest of the Southern Hemisphere, and the presence of other Portuguese colonies in that hemisphere, like Angola, Mozambique and Timor-Leste.

=== Other languages ===
The primary language of Iceland is Icelandic, while Mauritania, Morocco and Western Sahara are Arabic-speaking states.

=== Sporting culture ===
The Western Hemisphere has a sporting culture dominated by association football, athletics, American football, baseball, basketball and ice hockey. In North America, American football, baseball, basketball and ice hockey are particularly prominent, especially in the United States and Canada. American football is also prominent in the U.S. overseas territory of American Samoa, which neighbors Samoa. Association football is the dominant sport across Latin America, although basketball, volleyball, baseball and motorsports also have followings. The Caribbean has a distinctive sporting culture encompassing cricket, baseball, association football and athletics. Cricket is important in the English-speaking Caribbean, represented internationally by the West Indies team, while baseball is prominent in Cuba and the Dominican Republic. Athletics is especially successful in Jamaica, the Bahamas and other Caribbean countries, particularly in sprinting. Outside of the Caribbean, cricket also has a following in Ireland and the Western Hemisphere part of the United Kingdom, although the sport's popularity is concentrated in the Eastern Hemisphere, including countries such as Afghanistan, Australia, Bangladesh, India, New Zealand, Pakistan, South Africa, Sri Lanka and Zimbabwe. In West African Western Hemisphere countries, association football is the leading spectator sport. Senegal reached the quarter-finals of the 2002 FIFA World Cup, while Morocco became the first African team to reach the World Cup semi-finals in 2022. Rugby union's popularity in the Western Hemisphere is concentrated in Argentina, Chile, Ireland, Samoa, Tonga, Uruguay and the United Kingdom. In Samoa and Tonga, rugby union is the principle sport, with these countries having strong rugby traditions and internationally recognized national sides. Outside of rugby union, the native Gaelic football is another widely followed sport in Ireland. In other Western Hemisphere European countries such as Iceland and Portugal, association football is the primary sport, although in Iceland, handball is considered the de facto national team sport and it has deep cultural roots.

Countries fully or mostly in the Western Hemisphere have won 13 men's FIFA World Cup titles, comprising Brazil's five championships, Argentina's three, Uruguay's two, Spain's two and England's one. Western Hemisphere European football clubs have enjoyed considerable success in the UEFA Champions League, despite most European clubs being in the Eastern Hemisphere. Real Madrid, whose home city lies west of the prime meridian, is the most successful club in the history of the UEFA Champions League, with 15 titles. FC Barcelona is one of the few Spanish clubs in the Eastern Hemisphere, and is Spain's second most successful both domestically and in the UEFA Champions League, having won the competition five times. Aside from Real Madrid, other Western Hemisphere clubs that have won the competition include Liverpool F.C. with six, Manchester United with three, and Chelsea F.C., Manchester City, Nottingham Forest, S.L. Benfica and FC Porto with one each. In terms of Grand Slam singles victories, the most successful male and female tennis players born in the Western Hemisphere are American Pete Sampras, born in Washington D.C., with 14 Grand Slam titles, and American Serena Williams, born in Saginaw, Michigan, with 23 Grand Slam titles, the latter holding the women's Open Era record. Spanish tennis player Rafael Nadal, who won 22 Grand Slam singles titles, was born in Manacor on the island of Mallorca, at approximately 3°12′0″E longitude, placing his birthplace in the Eastern Hemisphere rather than the Western Hemisphere. The geographical distribution of the four Grand Slam tournaments is evenly divided between the Eastern and Western hemispheres: the Australian Open in Melbourne and the French Open in Paris are held in the Eastern Hemisphere, while the US Open in New York and Wimbledon in London are held in the Western Hemisphere. Wimbledon's All England Club is located just west of the prime meridian, at approximately 0°12′52″W.

== Sovereign states in both hemispheres ==
Below is a list of the sovereign states in both the Western and Eastern hemispheres on the IERS Reference Meridian:

=== Mostly in the Western Hemisphere (with some land east of prime meridian) ===
- United Kingdom, the prime meridian passes through Greenwich, London. Most of London and the rest of England lies within the Western Hemisphere, along with the entirety of Northern Ireland, Scotland and Wales. The majority of the population lives in the Western Hemisphere, with the main population centers in the Eastern Hemisphere being Cambridge, Essex, Ipswich, Kent and Norwich. Some parts of Sussex are also in the Eastern Hemisphere. Most of the United Kingdom's overseas territories are in the Western Hemisphere, such as the Falkland Islands and those located in the Caribbean. The default geographical coordinates for the United Kingdom are 55°N 3°W, per the centroid of the country.
- Spain, the prime meridian passes through Castellón de la Plana (Valencian Community). Most of Spain, including the capital Madrid, the Canary Islands and the southern half of its Mediterranean territorial waters, lies within the Western Hemisphere. Spanish, Moroccan and Algerian Mediterranean waters are the only part of the Mediterranean Sea located in the Western Hemisphere. Spain's Eastern Hemisphere population mostly reside in the parts of the Valencian Community east of the prime meridian, as well as Barcelona and the northern Mediterranean island of Mallorca, which are entirely in the Eastern Hemisphere. Aside from Barcelona, the rest of the Catalonia region is also in the Eastern Hemisphere. The default geographical coordinates for Spain are 40°N 4°W, per the centroid of the country.
- Mali, the prime meridian passes through the municipal area of Gao. Most of Mali, including the capital Bamako, lies within the Western Hemisphere. The default geographical coordinates for Mali are 17°N 4°W, per the centroid of the country.
- Burkina Faso, the prime meridian passes through Lalgaye. Most of the country, including the capital Ouagadougou, lies within the Western Hemisphere. Burkina Faso's largest city in the Eastern Hemisphere is Fada N'gourma. The default geographical coordinates for Burkina Faso are 12°N 1°W, per the centroid of the country.
- Ghana, the prime meridian passes through Tema. Most of Ghana, including the capital Accra, lies within the Western Hemisphere. Ghana's most populated settlements in the Eastern Hemisphere include Bimbilla, Ho, Tema New Town and Aflao. Lake Volta in Ghana is the largest artificial reservoir in the world, and it is situated in both the Eastern and Western Hemisphere. The default geographical coordinates for Ghana are 8°N 1°W, per the centroid of the country.

=== Mostly in the Eastern Hemisphere (with some land west of prime meridian) ===
- Denmark, due to the entirety of Greenland and the Faroe Islands. Denmark proper lies entirely within the Eastern Hemisphere. The default geographical coordinates for Denmark are 56°N 10°E, per the centroid of the country.
- Norway, due only to Jan Mayen. Mainland Norway, Svalbard and Bouvet Island lie entirely within the Eastern Hemisphere. The default geographical coordinates for Norway are 61°N 8°E, per the centroid of the country.
- The Netherlands has Caribbean overseas islands that lie entirely within the Western Hemisphere, while mainland Netherlands lies entirely within the Eastern Hemisphere. The default geographical coordinates for the Netherlands are 52°N 6°E, per the centroid of the country.
- France, the prime meridian passes through Puynormand (Gironde). About 1/3 of the country, including cities like Nantes or Bordeaux, as well as the overseas regions of Guadeloupe, Martinique, and French Guiana, lies in the Western Hemisphere. The majority of the population lives in the Eastern Hemisphere. The capital and most populated city Paris is entirely in the Eastern Hemisphere, along with the four next most populated cities (Lyon, Marseille, Toulouse, Nice), and other cities such as Cannes, Lille, Montpellier and Strasbourg. The offshore Mediterranean island of Corsica also lies within the Eastern Hemisphere. The default geographical coordinates for France are 47°N 2°E, per the centroid of the country.
- Algeria, the prime meridian passes through Stidia. About 1/4 of the country, including Oran, Algeria's second-largest city, lies within the Western Hemisphere. The majority of the population lives in the Eastern Hemisphere. The capital and most populated city Algiers is in the Eastern Hemisphere. After Algiers and Oran, the six next most populated cities (Constantine, Annaba, Blida, Batna, Djelfa and Sétif) are all located in the Eastern Hemisphere. The default geographical coordinates for Algeria are 28°N 2°E, per the centroid of the country.
- Togo, the prime meridian passes near Tami (Tône Prefecture in Savanes Region). Most of Togo, including the capital Lomé, lies within the Eastern Hemisphere. The default geographical coordinates for Togo are 8°N 1°E, per the centroid of the country.

Below is a list of additional sovereign states which are in both the Western and Eastern hemispheres along the 180th meridian. France and the United Kingdom are not listed below due to their inclusion above, though both have Western Hemisphere territories east of the 180th meridian, including France's Clipperton Island, French Polynesia and Wallis and Futuna, and the United Kingdom's Pitcairn Islands. France also has the Eastern Hemisphere territory of New Caledonia, to the west of the 180th meridian. With the exception of the United States (due to Wake Island, Guam and the Northern Mariana Islands), the places below are located on just one side of the International Date Line, which curves around them.

=== Mostly in the Western Hemisphere (with some land west of 180th meridian) ===
- United States, the 180th meridian passes through Aleutian Islands (Alaska). All of the country is in the Western Hemisphere, except for Guam, the Northern Mariana Islands, Wake Island and the various Aleutian Islands lying west of the 180th meridian (starting with Semisopochnoi Island at 51°N 179°E and ending with Attu Island at 52°N 172°E). The Islands situated between Semisopochnoi Island and Attu Island include Agattu, Alaid Island, Amchitka Island, Buldir Island, Davidof Island, Khvostof Island, Kiska, Little Kiska Island, Little Sitkin Island, Nizki Island, Segula Island and Shemya, among others. The default geographical coordinates for the United States are 40°N 100°W, per the centroid of the country.

=== Mostly in the Eastern Hemisphere (with some land east of 180th meridian) ===
- Russia, the 180th meridian passes through Chukotka Autonomous Okrug. Its portion lying east of the 180th meridian is the only part of the country lying in the Western Hemisphere. This far eastern part of Russia in the Western Hemisphere is also geologically part of the North American Plate, rather than the Eurasian Plate like with much of the country. Most of Russia, including the capital Moscow, lies within the Eastern Hemisphere. The default geographical coordinates for Russia are 66°N 94°E, per the centroid of the country.
- Kiribati, the 180th meridian passes close to Arorae. The country has both the Equator and the 180th meridian (antimeridian) crossing through its territory. It is the only country located in four hemispheres. The capital South Tarawa lies in the Eastern Hemisphere and Northern Hemisphere. Over half of Kiribati's population lives on South Tarawa. The default geographical coordinates for Kiribati are 1°N 173°E, per the centroid of the country.
- Fiji, the 180th meridian passes close to its dependency Rotuma and passes through Taveuni. The capital Suva is in the Eastern Hemisphere. The default geographical coordinates for Fiji are 18°S 179°E, per the centroid of the country.
- New Zealand's two main islands lie within the Eastern Hemisphere; but Chatham Islands and Kermadec Islands, as well as the self-governing states of the Cook Islands and Niue and the dependent territory of Tokelau, lie east of the 180th meridian. The capital Wellington is in the Eastern Hemisphere. The default geographical coordinates for New Zealand are 42°S 173°E, per the centroid of the country.

== Countries, dependencies and other territories in the Western Hemisphere ==
The following countries and territories lie entirely, mostly, or partially within the Western Hemisphere:

Africa
Entirely

- Cape Verde
- Gambia
- Guinea
- Guinea-Bissau
- Ivory Coast
- Liberia
- Madeira (Portugal)
- Mauritania
- Morocco
- Saint Helena, Ascension and Tristan da Cunha (United Kingdom)
  - Ascension Island
  - Saint Helena
  - Tristan da Cunha
    - Gough Island
- Senegal
- Sierra Leone
- Western Sahara (disputed)

Mostly

- Burkina Faso
- Ghana
- Mali

Partly

- Algeria
- Togo

Antarctica
Entirely

- Peter I Island (Claimed by Norway)
- South Orkney Islands (Claimed by Argentina and the United Kingdom)
- South Shetland Islands (Claimed by Argentina, Chile and the United Kingdom)

Partly

- Mainland Antarctica (Antarctic Treaty parties)
  - East Antarctica (partially)
  - Transantarctic Mountains (partially)
  - West Antarctica (entirely)

Asia
Partly

- Chukotka Autonomous Okrug (Russia)

Europe
Entirely

- Bailiwick of Guernsey (United Kingdom)
  - Alderney
  - Guernsey
  - Sark
- Bailiwick of Jersey (United Kingdom)
- Faroe Islands (Denmark)
- Gibraltar (United Kingdom)
- Iceland
- Isle of Man (United Kingdom)
- Jan Mayen (Norway)
- Portugal
- Ireland

Mostly

- Spain
- United Kingdom
  - England (mostly)
  - Northern Ireland (entirely)
  - Scotland (entirely)
  - Wales (entirely)

Partly

- France (Metropolitan)

Oceania
Entirely

- American Samoa (United States)
- Chatham Islands (New Zealand)
- Clipperton Island (France)
- Cook Islands (New Zealand)
- Easter Island (Chile)
  - Salas and Gómez Island
- French Polynesia (France)
  - Tahiti
- Galápagos Islands (Ecuador)
- Hawaii (United States)
- Howland and Baker Islands (United States)
  - Baker Island
  - Howland Island
- Jarvis Island (United States)
- Johnston Atoll (United States)
- Kermadec Islands (New Zealand)
- Kingman Reef (United States)
- Midway Atoll (United States)
- Niue (New Zealand)
- Palmyra Atoll (United States)
- Pitcairn, Henderson, Ducie and Oeno Islands (United Kingdom)
- Samoa
- Tokelau (New Zealand)
- Tonga

Mostly

- Wallis and Futuna (France)

Partly

- Fiji
- Kiribati

== Western Hemisphere statistics ==
=== GDP of countries fully or mostly in the Western Hemisphere ===
GDP of countries (Nominal, 2025)
Rank	Country	GDP (Nominal, USD)
1	United States	$30.86 trillion
2	United Kingdom	$4.01 trillion
3	Canada	$2.32 trillion
4	Brazil	$2.28 trillion
5	Spain	$1.91 trillion
6	Mexico	$1.84 trillion
7	Argentina	$683.59 billion
8	Ireland	$680.36 billion
9	Colombia	$457.10 billion
10	Chile	$357.40 billion
11	Portugal	$346.43 billion
12	Peru	$341.96 billion
13	Cuba	$201.99 billion
14	Morocco	$183.97 billion
15	Ecuador	$130.32 billion
16	Dominican Republic	$127.89 billion
17	Guatemala	$123.32 billion
18	Ghana	$114.71 billion
19	Costa Rica	$102.90 billion
20	Venezuela	$101.49 billion
21	Ivory Coast	$99.9 billion
22	Panama	$90.46 billion
23	Uruguay	$82.58 billion
24	Bolivia	$65.24 billion
25	Paraguay	$49.28 billion
26	Guinea	$42.27 billion
27	Honduras	$39.60 billion
28	Iceland	$38.47 billion
29	Senegal	$37.08 billion
30	El Salvador	$36.71 billion
31	Haiti	$32.10 billion
32	Mali	$31.23 billion
33	Burkina Faso	$27.68 billion
34	Guyana	$26.77 billion
35	Trinidad and Tobago	$25.93 billion
36	Jamaica	$22.59 billion
37	Nicaragua	$22.24 billion
38	The Bahamas	$17.22 billion
39	Mauritania	$12.60 billion
40	Barbados	$7.94 billion
41	Sierra Leone	$7.71 billion
42	Liberia	$5.22 billion
43	Suriname	$4.74 billion
44	Belize	$3.32 billion
45	Cape Verde	$3.06 billion
46	The Gambia	$2.78 billion
47	Guinea-Bissau	$2.66 billion
48	Saint Lucia	$2.66 billion
49	Antigua and Barbuda	$2.27 billion
50	Grenada	$1.47 billion
51	Samoa	$1.29 billion
52	Saint Vincent and the Grenadines	$1.21 billion
53	Saint Kitts and Nevis	$1.08 billion
54	Dominica	$744 million
55	Tonga	$692 million

=== Life expectancy of countries fully or mostly in the Western Hemisphere ===
Life expectancy by country (2025)
Rank	Country	Combined life expectancy	Life expectancy, males	Life expectancy, females
1	Spain	84.0 years	81.4 years	86.5 years
2	Ireland	83.1 years	81.4 years	84.7 years
3	Iceland	82.9 years	81.2 years	84.5 years
4	Portugal	82.5 years	79.7 years	85.2 years
5	Canada	82.2 years	80.0 years	84.3 years
6	United Kingdom	81.4 years	79.5 years	83.3 years
7	Chile	81.4 years	79.5 years	83.2 years
8	Costa Rica	81.0 years	78.4 years	83.6 years
9	Panama	79.8 years	76.9 years	82.7 years
10	United States	79.0 years	76.5 years	81.4 years
11	Cuba	78.3 years	75.9 years	80.7 years
12	Uruguay	78.2 years	74.4 years	82.0 years
13	Peru	78.0 years	75.6 years	80.3 years
14	Colombia	77.9 years	75.2 years	80.6 years
15	Ecuador	77.6 years	74.9 years	80.3 years
16	Antigua and Barbuda	77.6 years	74.7 years	80.4 years
17	Argentina	77.5 years	75.0 years	80.0 years
18	Barbados	76.3 years	73.8 years	78.8 years
19	Cape Verde	76.3 years	73.1 years	79.4 years
20	Brazil	76.1 years	73.0 years	79.1 years
21	Morocco	75.6 years	73.3 years	77.8 years
22	Grenada	75.5 years	72.5 years	78.5 years
23	Mexico	75.2 years	72.4 years	78.0 years
24	Nicaragua	75.1 years	72.5 years	77.6 years
25	The Bahamas	74.7 years	71.1 years	78.3 years
26	Paraguay	74.1 years	71.0 years	77.1 years
27	Dominican Republic	73.9 years	70.7 years	77.1 years
28	Belize	73.9 years	71.1 years	76.7 years
29	Suriname	73.8 years	70.6 years	77.0 years
30	Trinidad and Tobago	73.7 years	70.5 years	76.8 years
31	Honduras	73.1 years	70.5 years	75.7 years
32	Tonga	73.0 years	69.5 years	76.5 years
33	Saint Lucia	73.0 years	69.5 years	76.5 years
34	Venezuela	72.8 years	68.9 years	76.7 years
35	Guatemala	72.7 years	70.4 years	75.0 years
36	Saint Kitts and Nevis	72.5 years	68.7 years	76.2 years
37	El Salvador	72.2 years	67.8 years	76.5 years
38	Samoa	71.9 years	70.0 years	73.8 years
39	Saint Vincent and the Grenadines	71.7 years	68.8 years	74.5 years
40	Jamaica	71.6 years	69.1 years	74.1 years
41	Dominica	71.6 years	68.4 years	74.7 years
42	Guyana	70.4 years	66.6 years	74.1 years
43	Senegal	69.0 years	67.0 years	71.0 years
44	Bolivia	68.8 years	66.3 years	71.3 years
45	Mauritania	68.7 years	66.7 years	70.7 years
46	The Gambia	66.1 years	64.4 years	67.8 years
47	Ghana	65.8 years	63.3 years	68.2 years
48	Haiti	65.2 years	61.9 years	68.5 years
49	Guinea-Bissau	64.2 years	61.8 years	66.5 years
50	Liberia	62.3 years	61.0 years	63.6 years
51	Ivory Coast	62.3 years	60.2 years	64.3 years
52	Sierra Leone	62.0 years	60.2 years	63.7 years
53	Burkina Faso	61.3 years	59.1 years	63.4 years
54	Guinea	60.9 years	59.7 years	62.1 years
55	Mali	60.8 years	59.3 years	62.2 years

=== Gender ratio difference of countries fully or mostly in the Western Hemisphere ===
Difference in size between female population and male population (2025)
Rank	Country	Female population (% of total, 2025)	Male population (% of total, 2025)	Males per 100 females
1	Iceland	48.76%	51.24%	105.1
2	Saint Vincent and the Grenadines	49.14%	50.86%	103.5
3	Cape Verde	49.15%	50.85%	103.5
4	Ivory Coast	49.17%	50.83%	103.4
5	Senegal	49.21%	50.79%	103.2
6	Mali	49.55%	50.45%	101.8
7	Belize	49.56%	50.44%	101.8
8	Morocco	49.59%	50.41%	101.7
9	Samoa	49.63%	50.37%	101.5
10	Honduras	49.66%	50.34%	101.4
11	United States	49.75%	50.25%	101.0
12	Paraguay	49.87%	50.13%	100.5
13	Grenada	49.90%	50.10%	100.4
14	Bolivia	49.91%	50.09%	100.4
15	Panama	50.00%	50.00%	100.0
16	Dominica	50.06%	49.94%	99.8
17	Ghana	50.06%	49.94%	99.8
18	Suriname	50.06%	49.94%	99.8
19	Liberia	50.07%	49.93%	99.7
20	Sierra Leone	50.12%	49.88%	99.5
21	Ecuador	50.15%	49.85%	99.4
22	Burkina Faso	50.18%	49.82%	99.3
23	The Gambia	50.20%	49.80%	99.2
24	Peru	50.28%	49.72%	98.9
25	Chile	50.30%	49.70%	98.8
26	Dominican Republic	50.30%	49.70%	98.8
27	Argentina	50.35%	49.65%	98.6
28	Canada	50.35%	49.65%	98.6
29	Guatemala	50.40%	49.60%	98.4
30	Guinea	50.48%	49.52%	98.1
31	Ireland	50.50%	49.50%	98.0
32	Guinea-Bissau	50.55%	49.45%	97.8
33	Haiti	50.55%	49.45%	97.8
34	Jamaica	50.56%	49.44%	97.8
35	Costa Rica	50.60%	49.40%	97.6
36	Trinidad and Tobago	50.60%	49.40%	97.6
37	Venezuela	50.62%	49.38%	97.6
38	Colombia	50.66%	49.34%	97.4
39	Cuba	50.68%	49.32%	97.3
40	Saint Lucia	50.68%	49.32%	97.3
41	United Kingdom	50.75%	49.25%	97.0
42	Nicaragua	50.80%	49.20%	96.9
43	Brazil	50.82%	49.18%	96.8
44	Spain	50.91%	49.09%	96.4
45	Mauritania	50.92%	49.08%	96.4
46	Guyana	51.34%	48.66%	94.8
47	Uruguay	51.49%	48.51%	94.2
48	Mexico	51.51%	48.49%	94.1
49	Barbados	52.05%	47.95%	92.1
50	Saint Kitts and Nevis	52.19%	47.81%	91.6
51	The Bahamas	52.29%	47.71%	91.2
52	Portugal	52.37%	47.63%	90.9
53	Antigua and Barbuda	52.39%	47.61%	90.9
54	El Salvador	52.50%	47.50%	90.5
55	Tonga	52.77%	47.23%	89.5

=== Alcohol consumption of countries fully or mostly in the Western Hemisphere ===
Rank	Country	Alcohol consumption per person (litres of pure alcohol, 2020)
1	Burkina Faso	11.3 litres per person
2	Ireland	10.8 litres per person
3	United Kingdom	10.7 litres per person
4	Canada	9.9 litres per person
5	United States	9.9 litres per person
6	Saint Lucia	7.2 litres per person
7	Spain	9.2 litres per person
8	Portugal	8.9 litres per person
9	Barbados	8.2 litres per person
10	Argentina	8.1 litres per person
11	Iceland	7.9 litres per person
12	Brazil	7.7 litres per person
13	Chile	7.6 litres per person
14	Grenada	7.3 litres per person
15	Antigua and Barbuda	6.7 litres per person
16	Dominican Republic	6.5 litres per person
17	Peru	6.5 litres per person
18	Cape Verde	6.0 litres per person
19	Trinidad and Tobago	6.0 litres per person
20	Suriname	5.9 litres per person
21	Paraguay	5.6 litres per person
22	Saint Vincent and the Grenadines	5.6 litres per person
23	Uruguay	5.6 litres per person
24	Cuba	5.4 litres per person
25	Mali	5.3 litres per person
26	Dominica	5.0 litres per person
27	Guyana	5.0 litres per person
28	Mexico	4.8 litres per person
29	Panama	4.7 litres per person
30	Saint Kitts and Nevis	4.7 litres per person
31	Ghana	4.3 litres per person
32	Colombia	4.2 litres per person
33	Belize	3.7 litres per person
34	Guinea-Bissau	3.7 litres per person
35	Nicaragua	3.7 litres per person
36	The Bahamas	3.6 litres per person
37	Bolivia	3.6 litres per person
38	Costa Rica	3.3 litres per person
39	El Salvador	3.1 litres per person
40	Haiti	3.1 litres per person
41	Honduras	3.1 litres per person
42	Jamaica	3.1 litres per person
43	Ivory Coast	2.9 litres per person
44	Liberia	2.9 litres per person
45	Ecuador	2.5 litres per person
46	Samoa	2.4 litres per person
47	Venezuela	2.0 litres per person
48	Guatemala	1.5 litres per person
49	The Gambia	0.6 litres per person
50	Guinea	0.5 litres per person
51	Morocco	0.5 litres per person
52	Senegal	0.4 litres per person
53	Tonga	0.4 litres per person
54	Sierra Leone	0.3 litres per person
55	Mauritania	0.0 litres per person

== See also ==
- Land and water hemispheres
- Western world
