= List of Aleutian Island volcanoes =

- Akutan Volcano
- Amak Volcano
- Amukta Volcano
- Bobrof Volcano
- Bogoslof Volcano
- Buldir Volcano
- Chagulak Volcano
- Carlisle Volcano
- Cleveland Volcano
- Davidof Volcano
- Gareloi Volcano
- Great Sitkin Volcano
- Herbert Volcano
- Kagamil Volcano
- Kanaga Volcano
- Kasatochi Volcano
- Kiska Volcano
- Koniuji Volcano
- Korovin Volcano
- Little Sitkin Volcano
- Pogromni Volcano
- Seguam Volcano
- Segula Volcano
- Semisopochnoi Volcano
- Tanaga Volcano
- Uliaga Volcano
- Vsevidof Volcano
- Yunaska Volcano
