= Davidof Volcano =

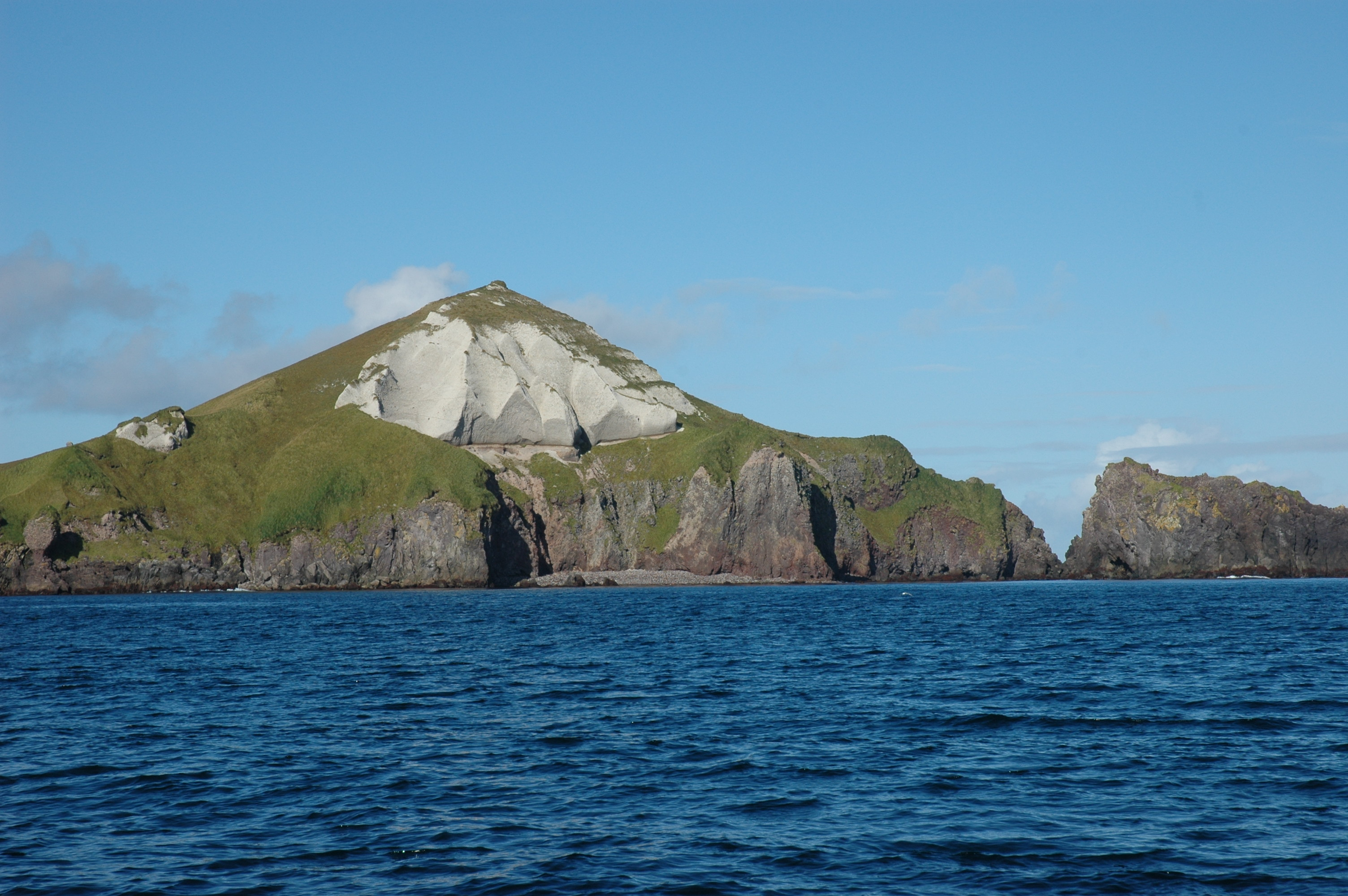

Highest point
- Elevation: 328 m (1,076 ft)
- Coordinates: 51.9542°N 178.326°E

Geography
- Location: North Pacific, part of Alaska
- Parent range: Aleutian Islands

Geology
- Formed by: Subduction zone volcanism
- Rock age: Cenozoic
- Mountain type: Stratovolcano
- Volcanic arc: Aleutian Arc

Davidof Volcano is a potentially active stratovolcano and caldera remnant in the Aleutian Islands of Alaska, USA, 1,237 miles (1,991 km) from Anchorage. Located on the eponymous island, Davidof is part of the Rat Islands sub-chain. It is also part of the "Aleutian Krakatau", a group of four islands formed when a stratovolcano caved in during the late Cenozoic.

In December 2021, an earthquake swarm was detected on the island, causing the Alaska Volcano Observatory to raise the volcano's alert level to Yellow. Another earthquake swarm, possibly a continuation of the first, was detected in late January 2022.

== Accessibility ==
Since the island is uninhabited, very little transportation is available. Transport can be found in Adak, albeit that the town is 199 miles (320 km) from the island.

== Geography and geology ==
Because of the inclusion of Alaska, the United States has the largest number of active volcanoes in the world, many of them geologically young. In Alaska, at least 50 volcanoes, including those in the Aleutian archipelago, have erupted in historical time. Alaska accounts for about 80% of the United States' volcanoes, excluding the seamounts in the area, about 8% of the world's volcanoes, and most of these are located among the Aleutian Islands. The Aleutian Arc forms the northern boundary of the Pacific Ring of Fire, where tectonic activity generates earthquakes and volcanic eruptions regularly.

The largest of four tiny islands in the "Aleutian Krakatau" caldera, Davidof is a stratovolcano and caldera remnant of a larger stratovolcano, which presumably collapsed at the end of the Cenozoic period. In all, the caldera extends for 262 feet (80 m) underwater. Davidof Island's shape is abstract, with many inclining, steep features and several sea cliffs. There are no visible water features.

Davidof's exact composition is unknown, although studies conducted by W.H. Nelson of the United States Geological Survey (USGS) determined that the lava, at least, was layered over a base of red breccia. The lavas appeared to be differentiating, but stuck to gray color with either "glassy or fine-grained, compact or dikty-taxitic" composition. Much like Segula Island, all of Davidof's lava and even pyroclastic deposits interact by overlapping with each other. The uppermost layer of these deposits is formed by the pyroclastic flow deposits. The lava is filled with phenocrysts like feldspar, olivine, and pyroxene, and these can be found easily about the lava areas.

=== Eruptive history ===
Although no eruptions have been recorded at Davidof, there is evidence of activity at the volcano. Through aerial photography, lava flow deposits have been detected among the flanks of the island. While the exact age of the deposits is still unknown, one source estimates that they are probably less than 10,000 years old.

== Wildlife ==
Despite its small size, Davidof is heavily vegetated, with variations of moss, lichen, and heath. Spread throughout the island are grass and sedges, which cover much of the lower surface. Fungi, liverworts, horsetails, and ferns, can be found on the island, along with flowering plants, such as the narcissus anemone, lupines, and orchids. Seaweed is also common on the island's beaches.
