= Segula Volcano =

Volcano in Alaska, United States

Coordinates: 52°00′55″N 178°08′12″E

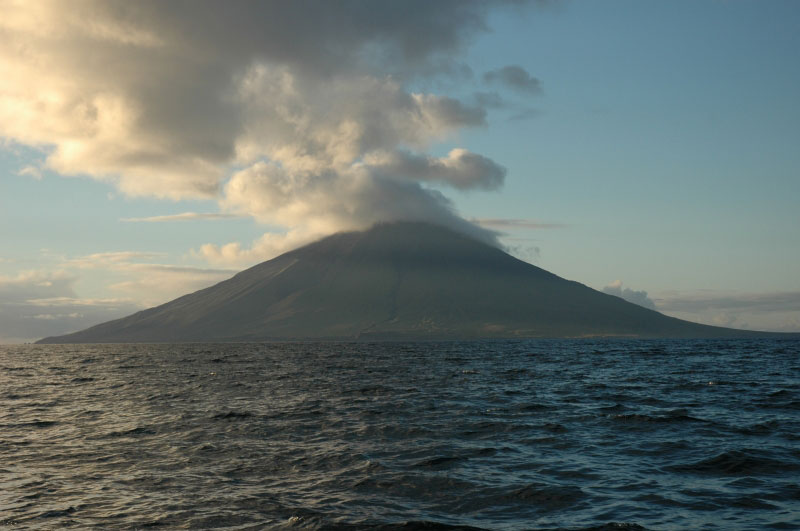

Highest point
- Elevation: 3,783 ft (1,153 m)

Geography
- Location: North Pacific, part of Alaska
- Parent range: Rat Islands (part of Aleutian Islands)

Geology
- Mountain type: Stratovolcano
- Volcanic arc: Aleutian Arc
- Last eruption: Unrecorded, within the last few hundred years

Segula Volcano lies 1,228 miles (1,976 km) westward of Anchorage on the Segula Island in the Aleutian Islands of Alaska. An inactive stratovolcano, it has not produced any historical eruptions, while barely eroded deposits on the flanks suggest that activity took place at the volcano as late as a couple of hundred years ago.

Built on top of a shallow platform, the volcano grew steadily from eruptions, and is composed of strata of flow deposits and pyroclastic material.

== Geography and geology ==
Part of the Rat Islands, Segula Volcano is located, along with the other Aleutians, in the Pacific Ocean. It is located in a row of islands which stretch from Kiska Island to as far east as the Andreanof Islands.

Segula Island and the volcano formed over an underwater land surface which hosts other Aleutian volcanoes such as Khvostof and Davidof. Andesitic lava and pyroclastic material was ejected from the underwater crater, building up over time to break the surface from nearly 350 feet (107 m) underwater.

Segula is made up of overlapping strata of lava flows and pyroclastic deposits, built up from the caldera. Largely built of eruptive material, the stratovolcano is conical and marked by a fissure. Since it is surrounded by lava flows on the north flank and a cinder cone on the other, the mountain's caldera, or main crater, appears tiny and is therefore very difficult to make out from any photographs. The north side of the island is summarized by sharp cliffs and a shallow reef which together make accessibility from that side difficult. It has not had a recorded eruption, though numerous deposits of lava flows and other ejecta on the southern and eastern flanks and a submarine deposit to the north of the summit which extends for 11 miles (18 km) have very little erosion, making it likely that Segula has erupted in the last few hundred years.
