= Pyramid Island (Alaska) =

Uninhabited island in the Aleutian Islands, Alaska, U.S.

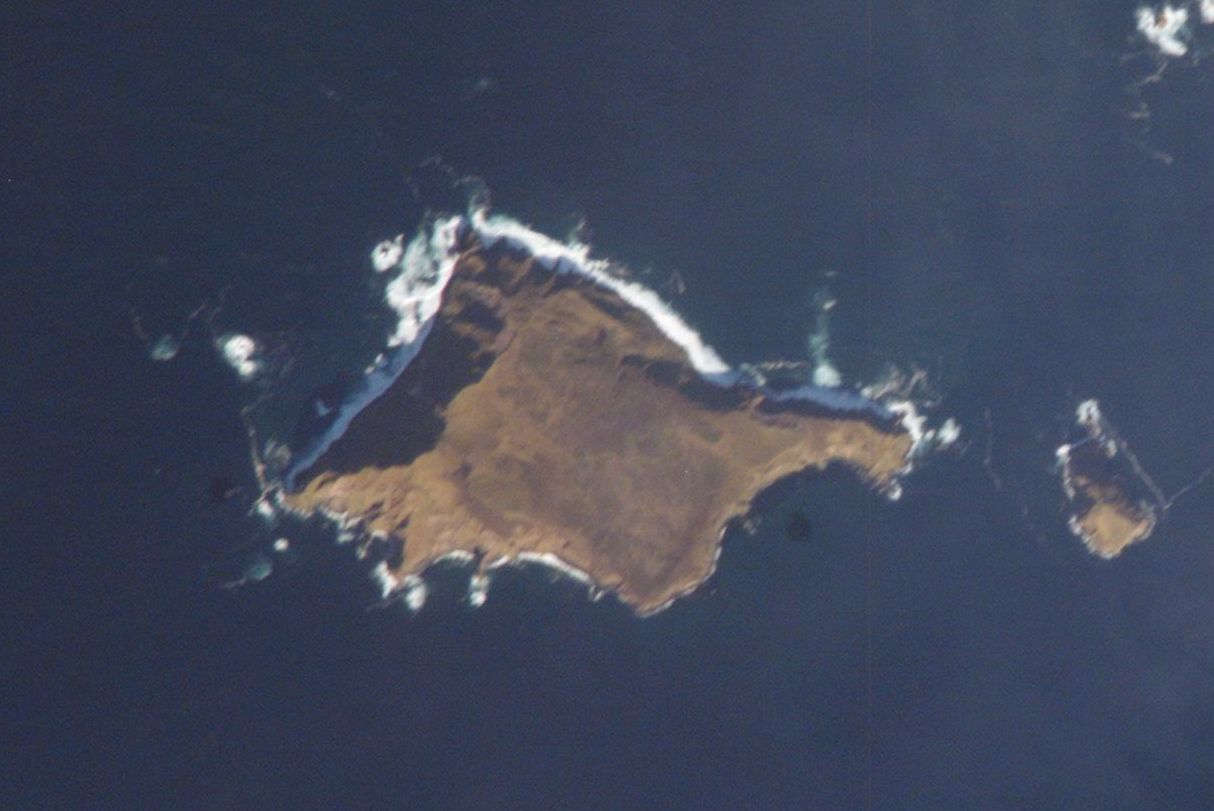
- Khvostof Island (left) and Pyramid Island (right)

Geography
- Coordinates: 51°57′50″N 178°18′43″E
- Archipelago: Rat Island
- Highest elevation: 328 ft (100 m)

Pyramid Island is an uninhabited island in the Rat Islands (Qax̂um tanangis) grouping among the Aleutian Islands. It is a caldera of a former volcano that exploded.

It received its name in 1935 from the crew of the USS Oglala due to its shape.

Doctors Aurel and Arthur Krause, who were in Alaska in 1881–1882 collected at Pyramid Island.

Pyramid Island is a small, triangular island located in the Lynn Canal, just north of Klukwan, Alaska. It is named for its distinctive pyramid-shaped peak, which rises to a height of about 100 feet.

Krause and Krause describe Pyramid Island as a "beautiful" and "picturesque" place. They were particularly impressed by its lush vegetation and its abundance of wildlife. They also noted that the island was a popular fishing spot for the Tlingits.

Here is a more detailed excerpt from their description of Pyramid Island:

Pyramid Island, a small, sharp, conical island, rises like a pyramid from the water, and is covered with a dense forest of fir and spruce trees. On the top of the island are a few small peaks, and on the north side is a deep bay. The island is a favorite fishing-ground for the Tlingits, and they have several fishing-huts on it.
