= Korovin Volcano =

Volcano in the U.S. state of Alaska

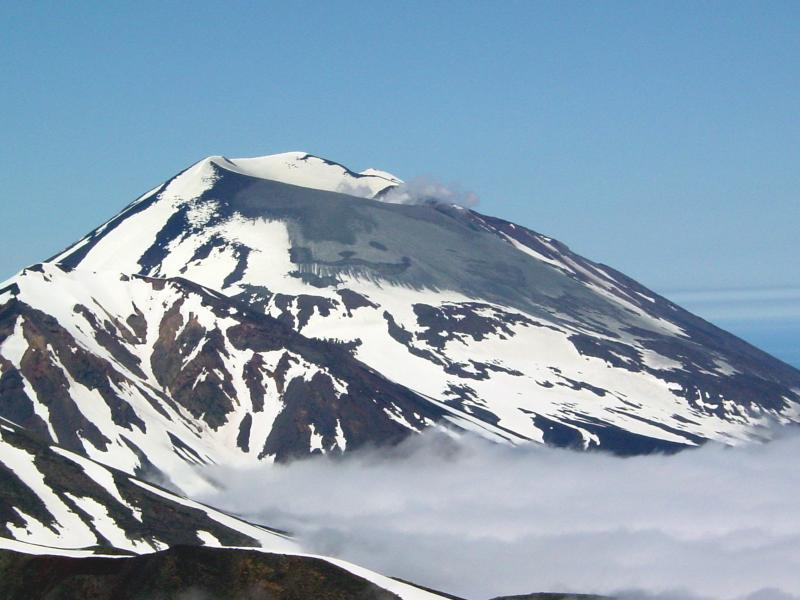
- Summit of Korovin Volcano in 2004.

Highest point
- Elevation: 5,030 ft (1,530 m)
- Prominence: 5,030 ft (1,530 m)
- Listing: US most prominent peaks 125th
- Coordinates: 52°22′49″N 174°10′06″W

Geography
- Location within Alaska
- Interactive map of Korovin Volcano
- Location: Atka Island, Alaska, U.S.

Geology
- Formed by: Subduction zone volcanism
- Mountain type: Stratovolcano
- Volcanic arc: Aleutian Arc
- Last eruption: July 16, 2026

Korovin Volcano is one of four volcanic centers of the Atka Volcanic Complex, located near the town of Atka on the northeast part of Atka Island in the Aleutian Islands chain, Alaska, United States. At 5,030 feet (1,530 m), Korovin is the highest point on the island.

Other cones of the Atka Volcanic Complex include Mount Kliuchef at 4,760 feet (1,450 m), Konia Volcano at 3,691 feet (1,125 m) and Sarichef Volcano at 3,465 feet (1,056 m) along with the Atka Caldera located between Kliuchef and Sarichef. Korovin is the most active of the four vents, but there have also been a couple historical eruptions attributed to nearby Kliuchef. Fumaroles and hydrothermal vents regularly steam from both peaks. A short-lived steam explosion occurred from the summit crater lake of Korovin on March 27, 2024 with no reports of ash emission. Three similar explosions occurred in 2025, as well as three more so far in 2026. The latest happened on July 16, 2026 according to the Alaska Volcano Observatory. There were also reports of recent eruptions at the volcano in 2002, 2004 and 2005 which are considered questionable.

== See also ==
- List of mountain peaks of North America
  - List of mountain peaks of the United States
    - List of mountain peaks of Alaska
      - List of Aleutian Island volcanoes
- List of Ultras of the United States
- List of volcanoes in the United States

== Sources ==
- "Atka". Global Volcanism Program. Smithsonian Institution.
- U.S. Geological Survey Geographic Names Information System: Korovin Volcano
- Alaska Volcano Observatory
