= Mount Gareloi =

Stratovolcano in the Aleutian Islands of Alaska, U.S.

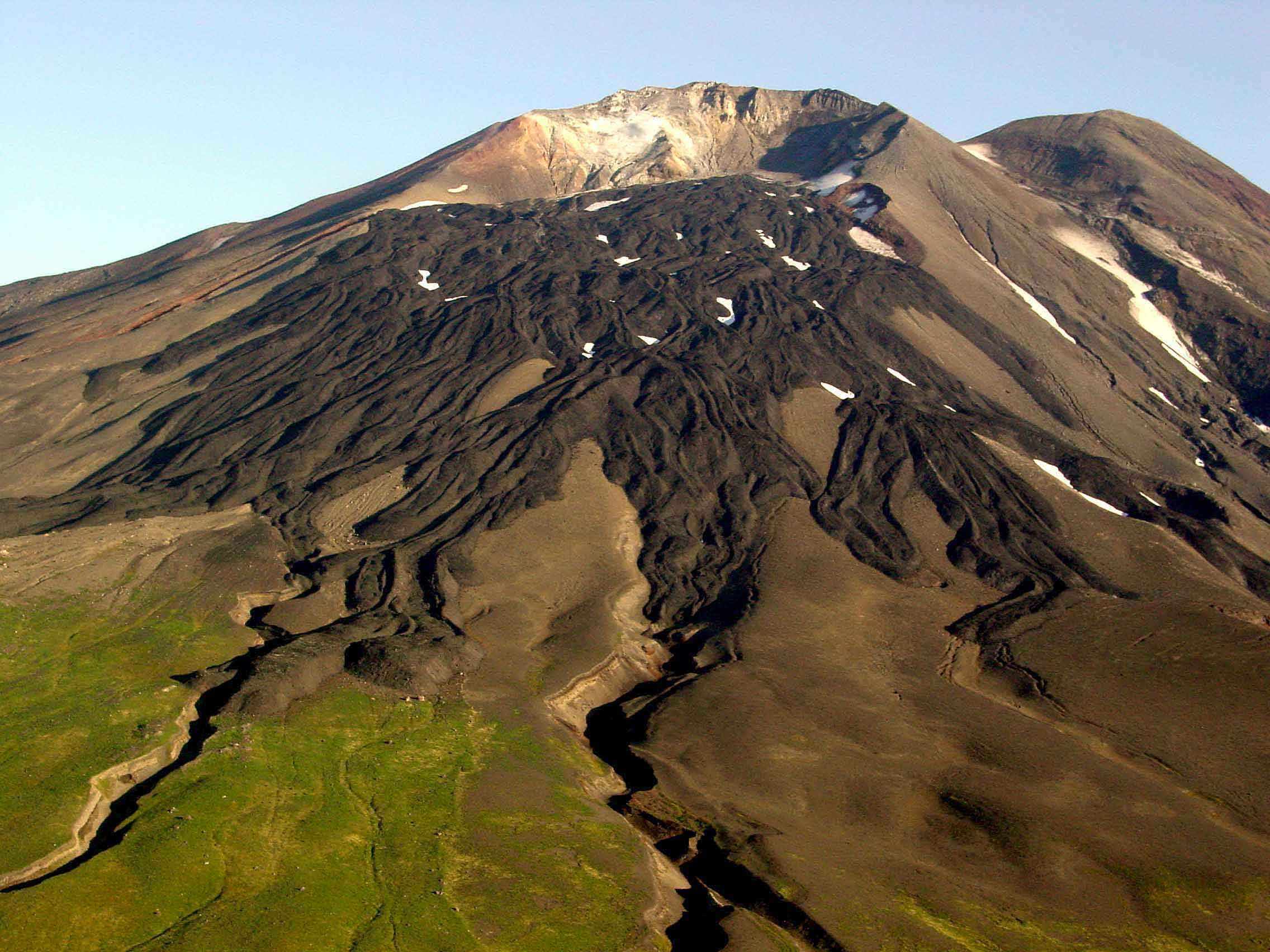
- Summit of the volcano

Highest point
- Elevation: 5,161 ft (1,573 m)
- Prominence: 5,161 ft (1,573 m)
- Listing: US most prominent peaks 118th
- Coordinates: 51°47′18″N 178°47′39″W

Geography
- Location within Alaska
- Location: Gareloi Island, Alaska, U.S.
- Parent range: Aleutian Islands

Geology
- Formed by: Subduction zone volcanism
- Rock age: Holocene-Pleistocene
- Mountain type: Stratovolcano
- Volcanic arc: Aleutian Arc
- Last eruption: August 1989

Mount Gareloi, or Gareloi Volcano, is a stratovolcano in the Aleutian Islands of Alaska, United States, about 1,259 miles (2,026 km) from Anchorage. Gareloi is located on Gareloi Island, and comprises most of its land mass. The island also has two small glaciers which protrude to the northwest and southeast.

The volcano is 6 miles (10 km) by 5 miles (8 km) at its base, possessing two summits. The southern crater is far greater in size, 984 feet (300 m) wide with fumaroles, which can be attributed to edifice failure in the southern wall, while Gareloi's northern crater is enclosed.

== Discovery and accessibility ==
Vitus Bering had been a prominent sailor in Russia. After successful expeditions in 1725, 1728, and 1730, Bering was sent to explore what is now the Bering Sea area of the Pacific in 1740. He soon settled on Kamchatka, where he started a settlement and built two additional vessels, dubbed St. Peter and St. Paul. In 1741 Bering and his company started towards North America, but were stalled by a storm and in being delayed were forced to take land. During the storm they could not make out the Alaskan coast. The storm proved too powerful so the ships turned around, along the way charting several of the Aleutians, including Gareloi. Since then, it has been barely studied, resulting in a fragmentary knowledge of its eruptions and possibly even unrecorded episodes.

Gareloi Island is uninhabited and is part of the Alaska Maritime National Wildlife Refuge managed by the U.S. Fish and Wildlife Service.

== Geography and geology ==
Gareloi is the northernmost volcano of the Delarof Group, a subgroup of the Aleutian Islands. It is composed of two craters, the older of which is covered by lava flows running to the northwest and southern coasts. The northern crater is small, with a feature suggesting dome collapse in its northwest flank. The southern flank, higher up and considerably larger, contains fumarolic activity. A fissure created by Gareloi's 1929 eruption runs along the southern summit of the volcano. Steep sea cliffs on the southwest side of the island cut into the older caldera. Three masses offshore of the island were produced by debris flows from the volcano.

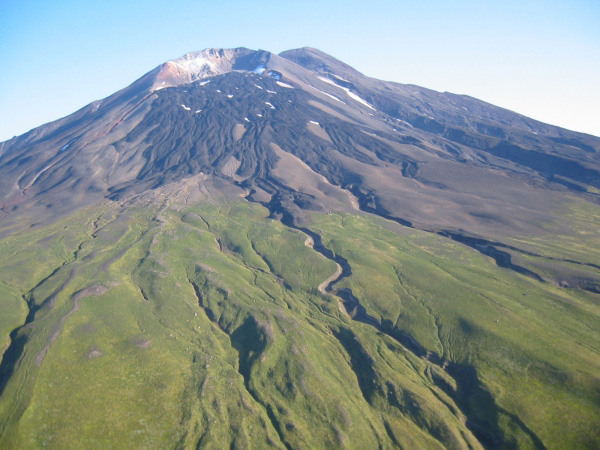
Fissure created from Gareloi's 1929 eruption. This feature runs down the southern summit.

Gareloi is of lava flows and pyroclastic origin. Two main episodes contributed to its creation. Lava deposits on the mountain vary from 3 feet (1 m) to 20 feet (6 m) in thickness. Some of them extend from external vents on the volcano, suggesting that activity during the Pleistocene took place.

There are two large lava valleys on the island's southwest side which are u-shaped. The oldest of these flows are of Pleistocene age composed of basaltic trachyandesite and basaltic andesite, with smaller amounts of plagioclase, clinopyroxene, olivine, and hornblende.

=== Rock ===
The rock that makes up Gareloi Island and its volcano is estimated to be of Pleistocene age. Several factors contribute to this inference, mainly the presence of glaciers and edifice failure (landslide) debris. The rock, which comprises dissected lava flows and pyroclastic masses, has been shaped by glacial retreat that began around 10,000 years past and fleshed out newly formed rocks. Other landslides have been generated on the north and east flanks of the volcano.

=== Mapping ===
The Alaska Volcano Observatory proceeded to map the volcano and its surrounding area in 2003, in addition to implementing seismic monitors in June.

== Eruptive history ==
Gareloi has an extensive eruptive history, dating back to at least 1760. At least 12 eruptions have occurred at the summit, accompanied by lava and pyroclastic flows. Typically they have been characterized by a central vent eruption followed by an explosive eruption, and sometimes a phreatic explosion. All have been of Volcanic Explosivity Index (VEI) of 1 to 3. Such eruptions have occurred in 1790, 1791, 1792, 1873, 1922, April 1929, 1950, January 17, 1952, August 7, 1980, January 15, 1982, September 4, 1987, and August 17, 1989. Uncertain eruptions occurred in 1760, 1828, 1927, and 1996.

=== 1929 ===
In 1929, Mount Gareloi underwent a major explosive eruption where it generated four lava flows, andesitic tuff, volcanic glass, and scoria of red tone. Thirteen craters, all located in the fissure, contributed to this episode. All are most likely phreatic. During the eruption, pyroclastic flows convened with tephra, as suggested by deposits. Lahar also streamed from the summit.

=== 1980s–1990s ===
On August 8, 1980 Gareloi erupted for the first time in records since 1929, sending ash plumes over 35,000 feet (10,668 m) into the atmosphere. Precursor earthquakes occurred on August 8 and 9, both west of the Adak seismic network. A similar episode took place in 1982 when an ash cloud exceeding 23,000 feet (7,010 m) appeared on satellite images on January 15. 1987 marked a milestone in Gareloi's eruptive history, when a flow, likely to be of volcanic origin, was observed by a commercial airplane pilot. The mass extended for 1,312 feet (400 m) down the volcano. Steam reportedly emanated from the volcano, but volcanologists were unable to verify an eruption. In 1989 an employee of the US Fish and Wildlife Service spotted another ash plume covering the caldera and climbing 2,300 feet (701 m) from the summit on August 17. A minor eruption occurred on September 27, 1996 was reported to the National Weather Service Aviation Weather Unit in nearby Anchorage. The plume, consisting of ash and steam, rose 5,000 feet (1,524 m) from the volcano's summit.

== Threat ==
Proximal volcanic hazards pose a significant threat to human life near Gareloi. If Gareloi were to erupt unexpectedly, ash clouds, falling volcanic ash, pyroclastic flows, and debris avalanches (such as lahars) could easily spawn deadly hazards such as tsunamis. As volcanic ash can induce engine failure, it puts commercial airplanes in particular at high risk. Inhalation of volcanic ash, also known as tephra, creates respiratory complexities and irritation of the eye.

Pyroclastic flows from an eruption would destroy much wildlife about the volcano. Gareloi has historically produced several pyroclastic flows, which can travel extremely fast. Future flows at Mount Gareloi could travel off the island into the Pacific Ocean and, if large enough, could fall into the ocean and generate tsunamis, though unlikely.

== See also ==
- List of mountain peaks of North America
  - List of mountain peaks of the United States
    - List of mountain peaks of Alaska
      - List of Aleutian Island volcanoes
- List of Ultras of the United States
- List of volcanoes in the United States
