= Davidof Island =

Island in Aleutians West Census Area, Alaska, United States

Coordinates: 51°57′36″N 178°20′03″E

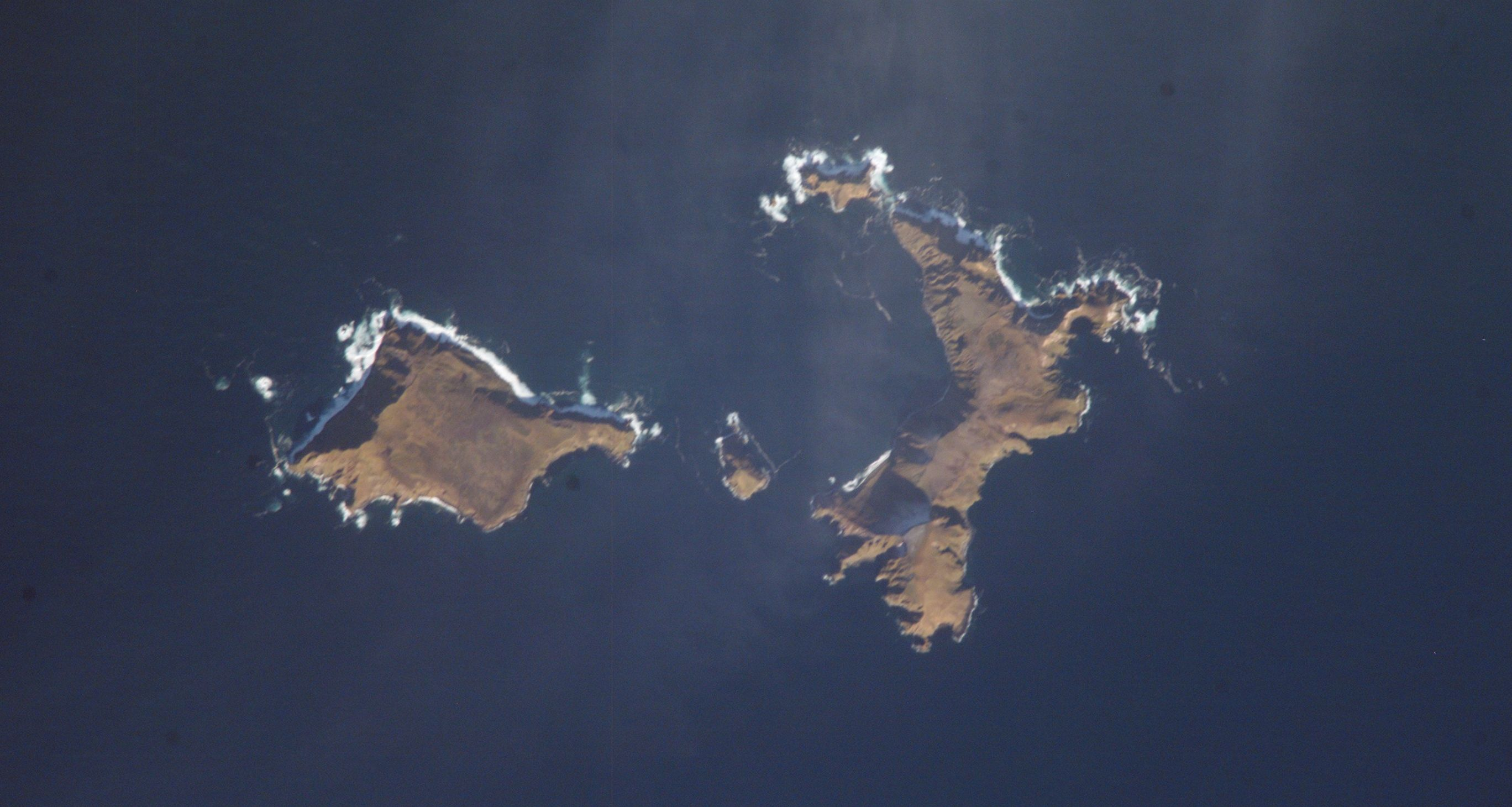
NASA - picture of Davidof, on left side Khvostof Island

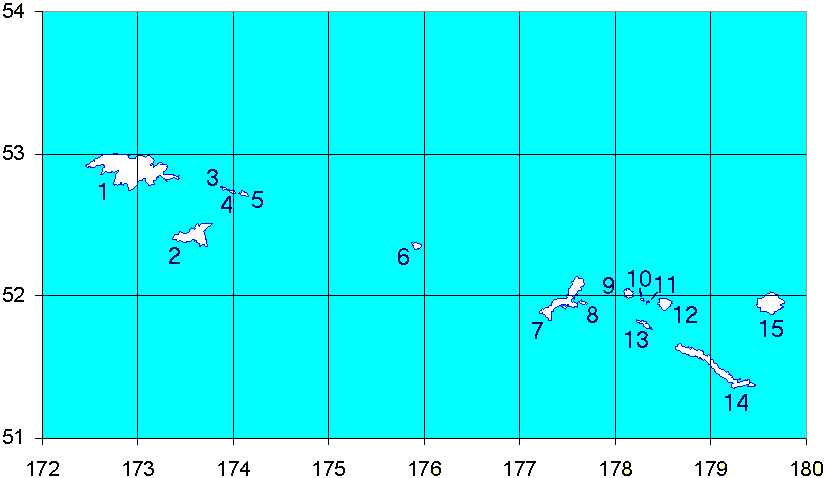
11 - Davidof

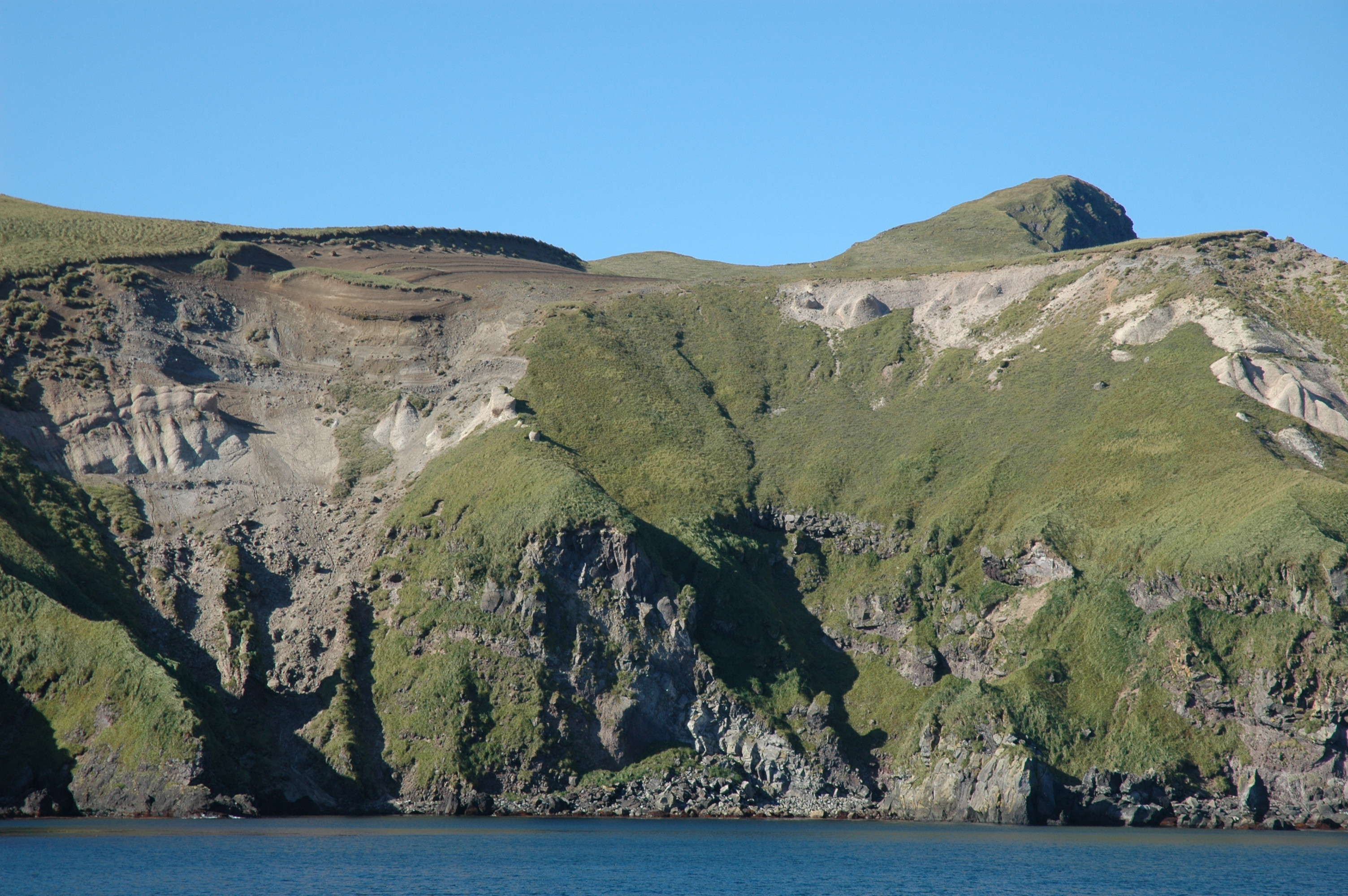
Davidof Island, September 27, 2005. Photo by C. A. Neal, Alaska Volcano Observatory / U.S. Geological Survey.

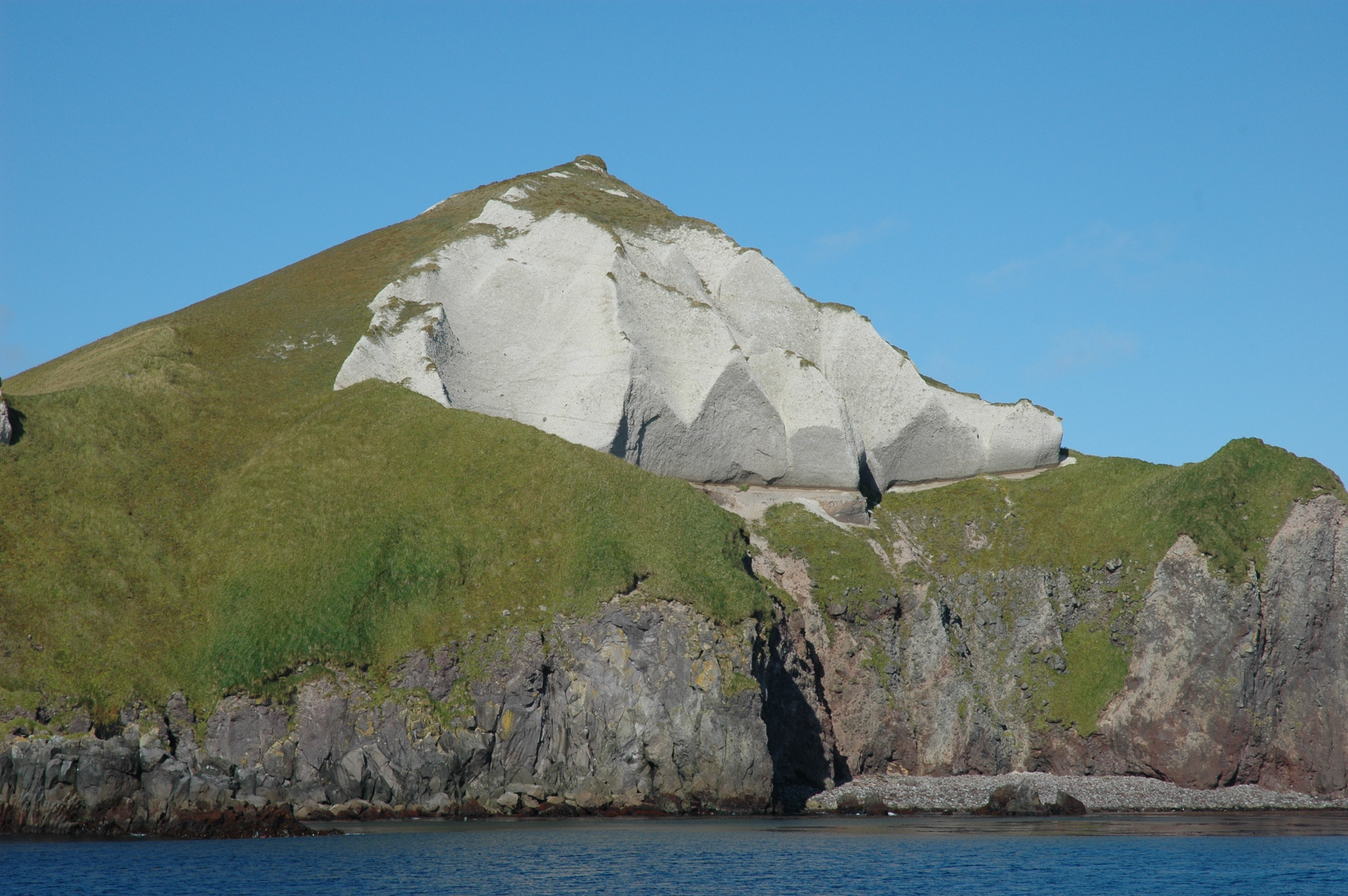
Davidof Volcano ash flow deposit, September 27, 2005. Photo by C. A. Neal, Alaska Volcano Observatory / U.S. Geological Survey.

Davidof Island (Qanan-tanax̂ in Aleut) is an island in the Rat Islands archipelago of the Western Aleutian Islands, Alaska, United States. Davidof Island is irregular in shape with a north–south length of 2 miles and a greatest width of 0.7 mile. The high point in the south part is 1,074 feet, and the summit in the north part is 922 feet high. Rocks on the north part of the island are hydrothermally altered. The projecting E point of the island is marked by a prominent cone-shaped grayish-tan summit.

Davidof island is believed to be part of a circular complex of island remnants of an ancient twin-coned volcano that was destroyed in a catastrophic eruption during the late Tertiary period — Davidof, and its smaller companions Lopy and Pyramid Islands, are remnants of the ancient caldera rim while Khvostof Island is a remnant of the western portion of the cone. Davidof Island has steep rocky shores that rise to an interior plateau to a maximum elevation of 328 m). Much of its coastline comprises steep slopes or beaches of boulder and pebbles while Crater Bay coast on the southwest contains sandy beach.

Davidof Island supports a substantial colony of tufted puffins and horned puffins.
