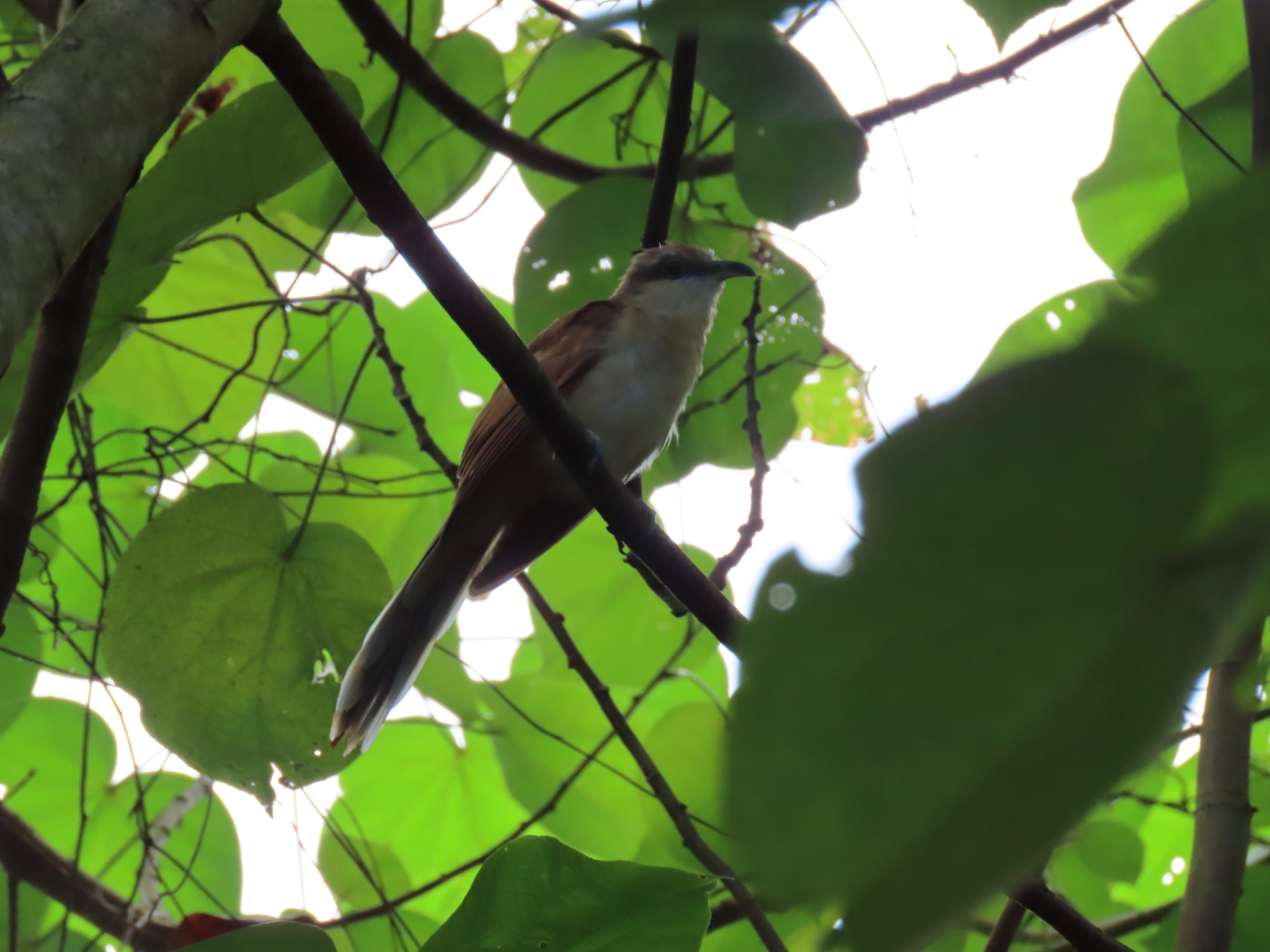

Conservation status
- Vulnerable (IUCN 3.1)

Scientific classification
- Kingdom: Animalia
- Phylum: Chordata
- Class: Aves
- Order: Cuculiformes
- Family: Cuculidae
- Genus: Coccyzus
- Species: C. ferrugineus

Binomial name
- Coccyzus ferrugineus Gould, 1843

= Cocos cuckoo =

Species of bird

The Cocos cuckoo (Coccyzus ferrugineus) is a Vulnerable species of bird in the tribe Phaenicophaeini, subfamily Cuculinae of the cuckoo family Cuculidae. It is endemic to Cocos Island, an island in the Pacific Ocean which is part of Costa Rica.

== Taxonomy and systematics ==
The Cocos cuckoo was at one time treated as a subspecies of the mangrove cuckoo (C. minor), and the two are now considered sister species. The pearly-breasted cuckoo (C. euleri) and yellow-billed cuckoo (C. americanus) are also closely related to those two. The Cocos cuckoo is monotypic.

The Cocos cuckoo's generic name coccyzus is from the Ancient Greek kokkuzo, meaning a common cuckoo's cry. The specific epithet ferrugineus is derived from Latin and means "rusty", referring to the color of its upperparts.

== Description ==
The Cocos cuckoo is 32 to 33 cm (13 to 13 in) long, about half of which is the tail, and weighs about 70 g (2.5 oz). Their bill is stout and somewhat decurved. Its maxilla is black and its mandible yellow to yellow-orange with a black tip. Males and females have the same plumage. Adults' forehead and crown are slate gray and their upperparts grayish brown. Their wings are rufous. The upper surface of their tail is grayish brown and the undersides black with wide white tips. Their face has a narrow blackish "mask" past the eye, which is surrounded by a narrow ring of yellow to orange yellow bare skin. Their throat and breast are buffy white and the belly and undertail coverts rich buff. Juveniles are similar to adults but have less contrast between the head and back colors, a less contrasting facial mask, a whitish throat, chest and belly, and less white on the tail.

== Distribution and habitat ==
The Cocos cuckoo is found only on Cocos Island, which is about 550 km (340 mi) miles off Costa Rica's Pacific coast. It inhabits essentially the entire island, using most of the plant communities on it: flooded bay forest, riparian forest, tropical rainforest, and tropical cloudforest. It is found from sea level the highest points on the island at about 450 m (1,500 ft).

== Behavior ==
=== Movement ===
The Cocos cuckoo is a year-round resident throughout the island, but it tends to occur at forest edges during the breeding season and in the forest interior when not breeding.

=== Locomotion ===
The Cocos cuckoo usually makes only short flights. It often moves among and within trees by hops along branches and short flutters and glides.

=== Feeding ===
The adult Cocos cuckoo feeds primarily on caterpillars, especially those of the giant sphinx moth (Cocytius antaeus) and the Orion cecropian butterfly (Historis odius). Young are fed crickets and cockroaches. Its foraging technique varies by habitat, including hunting at ground level by short flights, gleaning from understory plants, and probing in Guzmania sanguinea bromeliads on Sacoglottis holdridgei trees. In addition to caterpillars and other arthropods, it also occasionally eats Anolis towsendi, an endemic lizard.

=== Breeding ===
The Cocos cuckoo breeds during the dry season of January to mid-April. Both members of a pair build the flimsy stick cup nest with no lining, and usually place it on a smallish branch of a small tree. Two such nests were both about 2.5 m (8 ft) above the ground, and both were partially shielded by leaves. Both sexes share incubation and parental care. The clutch size is not definitely known but is believed to be one or two. The incubation period is not known but is thought to be similar to the nine to 12 days of others of its genus. The time to fledging is also not known.

=== Vocalization ===
As of late 2022, xeno-canto had no recordings of the Cocos cuckoo's vocalizations and the Cornell Lab of Ornithology's Macaulay Library had only three. The song is described as "a guttural Eeh-eeh-eeh-eeh-eeh-eeeh-eeeehh" and is most frequently sung during the breeding season, and then between dawn and noon.

== Status ==
The IUCN has assessed the Cocos cuckoo as Vulnerable. It has a very small range. Its estimated population of between 250 and 1000 mature individuals is believed to be stable. Feral cats, pigs, and goats, as well as deer, are potential threats - the first as a predator and the others as damaging to the species' habitat. Disturbance from tourism is also increasing, and climate change is another potential threat.
