= Bobrof Island =

Island in the U.S. state of Alaska

Bobrof Volcano
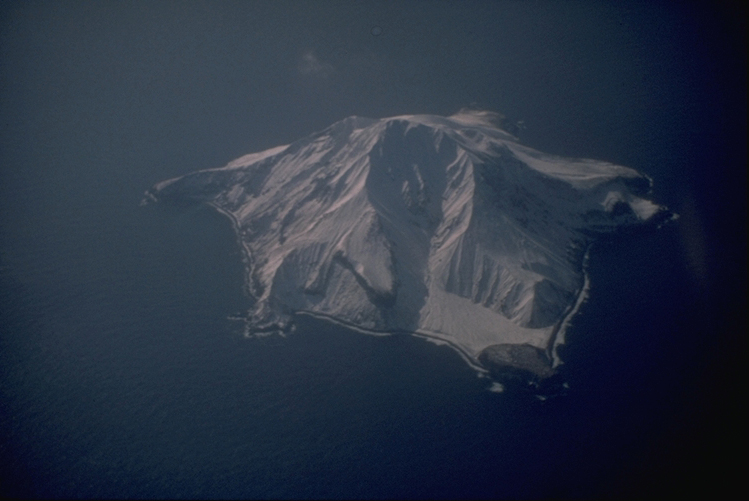
- Bobrof Island and the volcano

Highest point
- Elevation: 2,421 ft (738 m)
- Coordinates: 51°54′30″N 177°26′20″W

Geography
- Location within Alaska
- Location: North Pacific, part of Alaska
- Parent range: Aleutian Islands

Geology
- Rock age: Holocene
- Mountain type: Stratovolcano
- Volcanic arc: Aleutian Arc

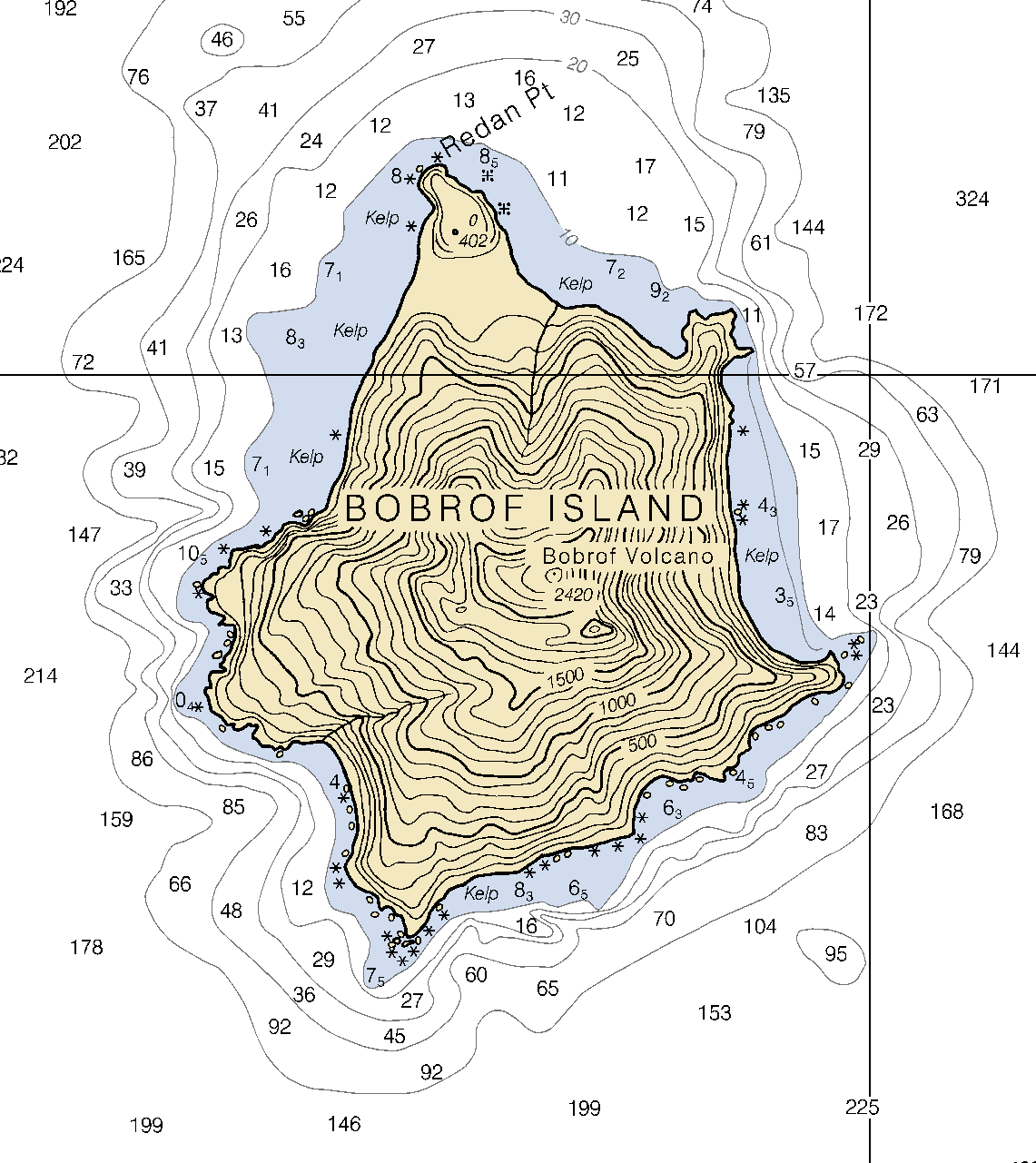
Nautical Chart of Bobrof Island

Location in Alaska

Bobrof Island (Aleut: Walĝa) is one of the Andreanof Islands subgroup of the Aleutian Islands in southwestern Alaska, United States. Bobrof Island is a small, uninhabited island about 9 miles (14 km) north and west of Kanaga Island, and 7 miles (11 km) northeast of Cape Sudak on Tanaga Island. Bobrof Island is 2.6 miles (4.2 km) long and 1.8 miles (2.9 km) wide with an area of 3 square miles (7.8 km^{2}), and consists primarily of the 2,421-foot (738 m) high Bobrof Volcano. The volcanic crater, or cone, has been heavily dissected. Underwater deposits adjacent to the island's northeast flank suggest an immense debris-avalanche has taken place.

== Bobrof Volcano ==
Bobrof Volcano is an inactive stratovolcano which forms the small Bobrof Island. No recorded eruptions have taken place at Bobrof or in its vicinity. It has been considered as Holocene age.

=== Geography and geology ===
Because of the inclusion of Alaska, the United States has the largest number of active volcanoes in the world, many of them geologically young. In Alaska, at least 50 volcanoes, including those in the Aleutian archipelago, have erupted in historical time. Alaska accounts for about 80% of the United States' volcanoes, excluding the seamounts in the area, about 8% of the world's volcanoes, and most of these are located among the Aleutian Islands. The Aleutian Islands arc forms the northern boundary of the Pacific Ring of Fire, where tectonic activity generates earthquakes and volcanic eruptions regularly.

The volcano is thought to be of Holocene age. Though no historical eruptions have taken place at Bobrof, it has erupted at least once. This data can be confirmed through pyroclastic flow deposits containing andesite. Once these flows were studied, at a building intended for earthquake monitoring, they confirmed that Bobrof was prone to explosive activity. There are lava deposits on the mountain which also suggest activity similar to shield eruptions. In collected samples, there are traces of basaltic andesite and dacite. No complete publications exist for Bobrof's definite geology, just those with facts and some information.
