= Anolis townsendi =

Conservation status
- Least Concern (IUCN 3.1)

Scientific classification
- Kingdom: Animalia
- Phylum: Chordata
- Class: Reptilia
- Order: Squamata
- Suborder: Iguania
- Family: Dactyloidae
- Genus: Anolis
- Species: A. townsendi

Binomial name
- Anolis townsendi Stejneger, 1900

Synonyms
- Norops townsendi (Stejneger, 1900)

Species of lizard

Anolis townsendi, Townsend's anole or Cocos Island anole, is a species of lizard in the family Dactyloidae. The species is endemic to Cocos Island in Costa Rica.

== Ecology ==
A. townsendi is sometimes predated on by the Cocos cuckoo (Coccyzus ferrugineus), a bird and another endemic species of the island.
