= Segula Island =

Island in the U.S. state of Alaska

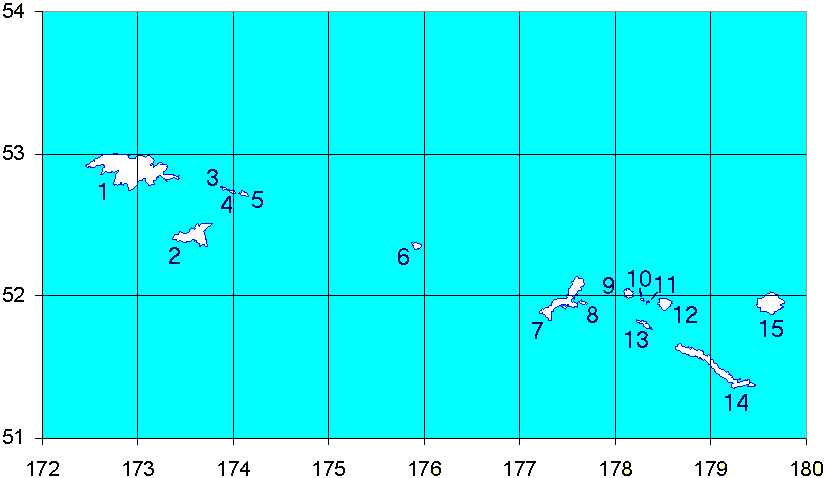
- Segula Island: 9

Highest point
- Elevation: 3,806 ft (1,160 m)
- Prominence: 3,806 ft (1,160 m)
- Coordinates: 52°01′21″N 178°07′58″E

Geography
- Location: Aleutian Islands, Alaska, US
- Topo map: USGS Rat Islands

Geology
- Formed by: Subduction zone volcanism
- Mountain type: Stratovolcano
- Volcanic arc: Aleutian Arc
- Last eruption: Unknown

Segula Island (Aleut: Chiĝulax̂) is an island in the Rat Islands archipelago of the western Aleutian Islands, Alaska. It consists of a Holocene stratovolcano called Segula Volcano.

Segula Island is three to four miles in diameter and is located about 15 miles (24 km) east of Kiska Island. The island supports a large auklet colony, one of only nine in the Aleutian Island chain.

== Climate ==
Along with the other Rat Islands, Segula Island has a cool, wet, marine climate. Frequently, it snows from October to May off and on. The Rat Islands also lie in the path of major Pacific storms bringing winds of up to 100 miles (161 km) per hour.

== Wildlife ==
Segula hosts vegetation typical to the Aleutian Islands, largely moss, lichens, and heath, in addition to sedges, grass, fungi, various herbs, fern, and flowering plants such as Narcissus anemone, lupines, and orchids.
