= Khvostof Island =

Island in Alaska, United States

Coordinates: 51°58′50″N 178°16′36″E

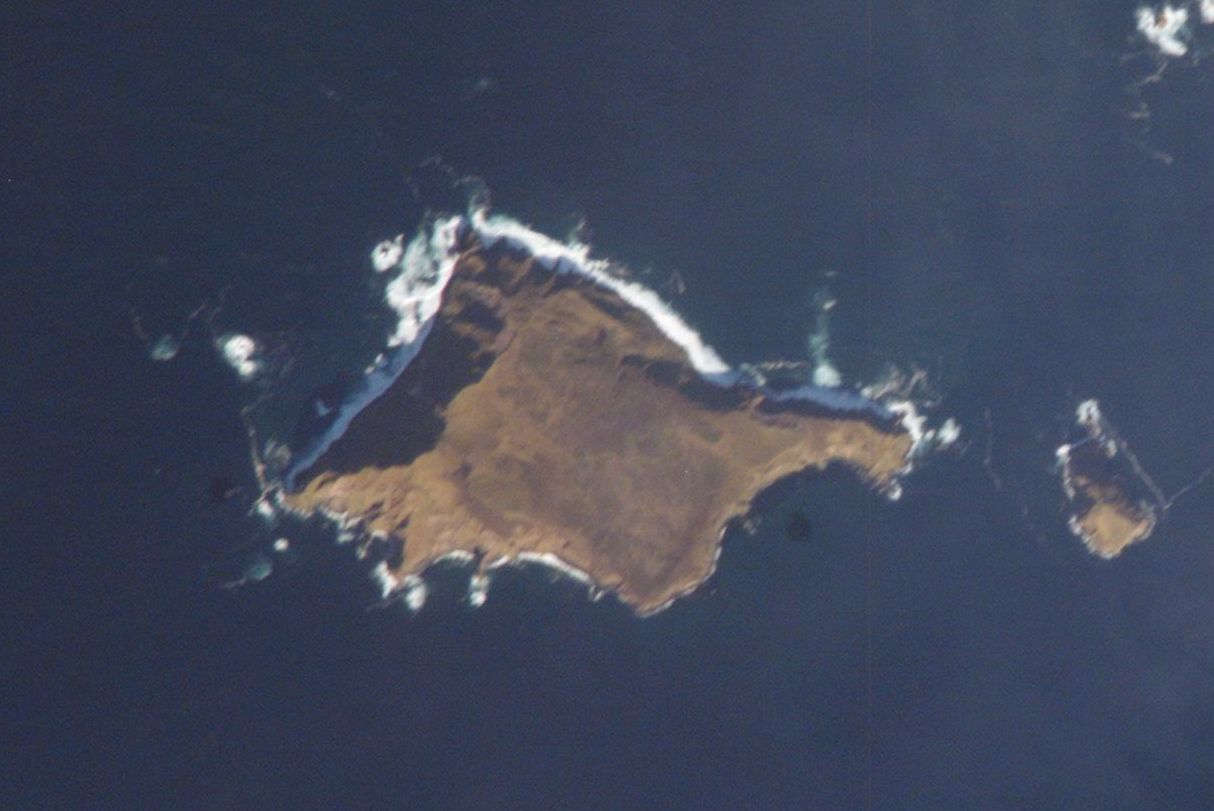
Khvostof Island (left) and Pyramid Island (right)

Location in Alaska

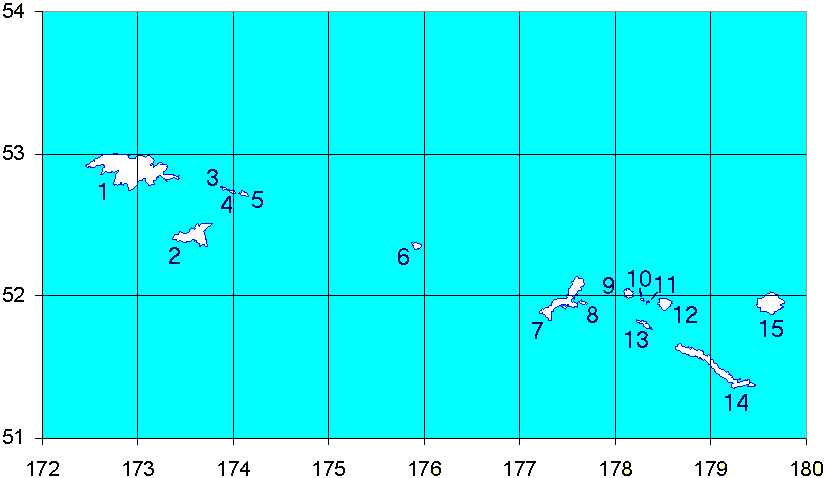
Map of the West-Aleuts - (10) Khvostof

Khvostof Island or Atanak (Aleut: Atanax̂; Russian: Остров Хвостова) is an island in the Rat Islands archipelago of the Western Aleutian Islands, Alaska. The island is 2 kilometres (1.2 mi) long and 2.74 kilometres (1.70 mi) wide.
