= Rat Islands =

Group of islands in Alaska, United States

Coordinates: 51°47′17″N 178°18′10″E

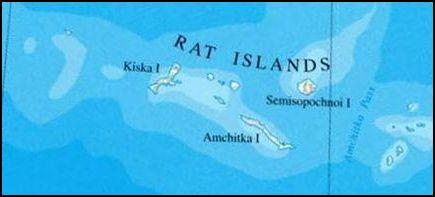
Map of Rat Islands showing major islands (line between Semisopochnoi Island and Amchitka Pass is the 180th meridian)

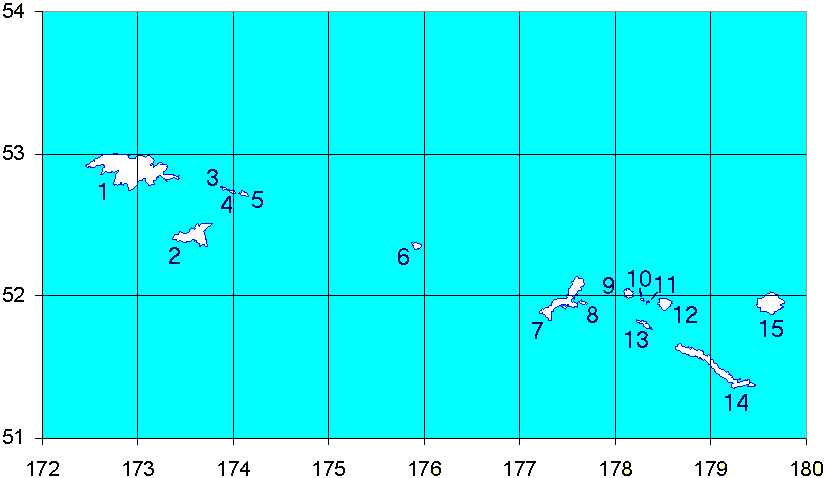
Map of the western Aleutian Islands, showing the Rat Islands on the right: Kiska Island (7), Little Kiska Island (8), Segula Island (9), Khvostof Island (10), Davidof Island (11), Little Sitkin Island (12), Hawadax Island (13), Amchitka Island (14), and Semisopochnoi Island (15)

The Rat Islands (Aleut: Qax̂um tanangis,) are a group of American volcanic islands in the Aleutian Islands in southwestern Alaska, between Buldir Island and the Near Islands group to its west, and Amchitka Pass and the Andreanof Islands group to its east. The islands in the group are, from west to east, Kiska, Little Kiska, Segula, Hawadax or Kryssei, Khvostof, Davidof, Little Sitkin, Amchitka, and Semisopochnoi. The total land area of the Rat Islands is 360.849 sq mi (934.594 km^{2}). None of the islands are inhabited at present, but Amchitka Island was an Aleut territory until the end of the eighteenth century. The Aleuts from the Rat Islands and the Near Islands were the only indigenous peoples from the 50 U.S. states which were native to the Eastern Hemisphere, since both island groups run past the 180th meridian.

The name Rat Islands is the English translation of the name given to the islands by Captain Fyodor Petrovich Litke in 1827 when he visited the Aleutian Islands on a voyage around the world. The islands are named so because rats were accidentally introduced to Hawadax Island (formerly known as Rat Island) in about 1780. As of 2009, after a government-funded eradication program, Rat Island is believed to be rat-free; it was renamed Hawadax Island in 2012. However, a post-operation assessment found that many of the island's local bird populations were negatively impacted — there was a far higher-than-expected nontarget mortality. Regarding nontarget mortality, the post-operation assessment concluded that "given the necropsy and toxicology results, the reviewers agree with the partners that it is reasonable to assume that many, if not most of the gull and eagle mortalities were due to primary or secondary poisoning", likely from eating poisoned rats. An internal U.S. Fish and Wildlife Service Office of Law Enforcement investigation revealed that several laws may have been violated.

After the eradication, scientific monitoring found evidence of recovery among native birds. A 2021 study reported that, 11 years after rat removal, bird colonies had begun to recolonize the islands.

The Rat Islands are earthquake-prone as they are located on the boundary of the Pacific and North American tectonic plates. The 1965 Rat Islands earthquake was one of the largest in recorded history with a magnitude of 8.7.
