= 178th meridian =

178th meridian may refer to:

- 178th meridian east, a line of longitude east of the Greenwich Meridian
- 178th meridian west, a line of longitude west of the Greenwich Meridian

178th meridian west	178th meridian east
