= 3rd meridian =

3rd meridian may refer to:

- 3rd meridian east, a line of longitude east of the Greenwich Meridian
- 3rd meridian west, a line of longitude west of the Greenwich Meridian
- The Third Principal Meridian in Illinois, United States, 89°10'15" west of Greenwich
- The Third Meridian of the Dominion Land Survey in Canada, 106° west of Greenwich
