= 177th =

177th is the ordinal form of the number 177. 177th or One hundred and seventy-seventh may also refer to:

- A fraction, 1/177, equal to one of 177 equal parts

== Geography ==
- 177th meridian east, a line of longitude
- 177th meridian west, a line of longitude

== Military ==
- 177th Brigade (disambiguation)
- 177th Rifle Division, Red Army
- 177th Regiment (disambiguation)

== See also ==
- June 26, 177th day of the year in a standard year
