= 176th meridian =

176th meridian may refer to:

- 176th meridian east, a line of longitude east of the Greenwich Meridian
- 176th meridian west, a line of longitude west of the Greenwich Meridian

176th meridian west	176th meridian east
