= 179th meridian =

179th meridian may refer to:

- 179th meridian east, a line of longitude east of the Greenwich Meridian
- 179th meridian west, a line of longitude west of the Greenwich Meridian

179th meridian west	179th meridian east
