= 176th Division =

176th Division may refer to:

- 176th Infantry Division, Wehrmacht, Germany
- 176th Rifle Division, Soviet Union

== See also ==
- List of military divisions by number
- 176th Brigade (disambiguation)
- 176th Regiment (disambiguation)
- 176th (disambiguation)
