= 176th =

176th is the ordinal form of the number 176. 176th or One hundred and seventy-sixth may also refer to:

- A fraction, 1/176, equal to one of 176 equal parts

== Geography ==
- 176th meridian east, a line of longitude
- 176th meridian west, a line of longitude

== Military ==
- 176th Brigade (disambiguation)
- 176th Division
- 176th Regiment (disambiguation)

== See also ==
- June 25, 176th day of the year in a standard year
