= 4th meridian east =

Line of longitude

4th meridian east

The meridian 4° east of Greenwich is a line of longitude that extends from the North Pole across the Arctic Ocean, the Atlantic Ocean, Europe, Africa, the Southern Ocean, and Antarctica to the South Pole.

The 4th meridian east forms a great circle with the 176th meridian west.

== From Pole to Pole ==
Starting at the North Pole and heading south to the South Pole, the 4th meridian east passes through:

Co-ordinates	Country, territory or sea	Notes
90°0′N 4°0′E	Arctic Ocean	
81°25′N 4°0′E	Atlantic Ocean	
61°0′N 4°0′E	North Sea	
51°50′N 4°0′E	Netherlands	Islands of Goeree-Overflakkee and Schouwen-Duiveland; Peninsulas of Tholen and Zuid-Beveland; Zeelandic Flanders
51°14′N 4°0′E	Belgium	
50°21′N 4°0′E	France	Passing just west of Reims (at 49°16′N 4°2′E)
43°33′N 4°0′E	Mediterranean Sea	
40°4′N 4°0′E	Spain	Island of Menorca
39°55′N 4°0′E	Mediterranean Sea	
36°54′N 4°0′E	Algeria	
19°5′N 4°0′E	Mali	
16°6′N 4°0′E	Niger	For about 8 km
16°1′N 4°0′E	Mali	For about 5 km
15°59′N 4°0′E	Niger	
12°51′N 4°0′E	Nigeria	
6°25′N 4°0′E	Atlantic Ocean	
60°0′S 4°0′E	Southern Ocean	
70°3′S 4°0′E	Antarctica	Queen Maud Land, claimed by Norway

Next westward: 3rd meridian east	4th meridian east forms a great circle with 176th meridian west	Next eastward: 5th meridian east
