= 2nd meridian west =

Line of longitude

2nd meridian west

The meridian 2° west of Greenwich is a line of longitude that extends from the North Pole across the Arctic Ocean, the Atlantic Ocean, Europe, Africa, the Southern Ocean, and Antarctica to the South Pole.

The 2nd meridian west forms a great ellipse with the 178th meridian east.

== From Pole to Pole ==
Starting at the North Pole and heading south to the South Pole, the 2nd meridian west passes through:

Co-ordinates	Country, territory or sea	Notes
90°0′N 2°0′W	Arctic Ocean	
81°45′N 2°0′W	Atlantic Ocean	Passing just east of the island of Foula, Scotland, United Kingdom (at 60°8′N 2°3′W)
59°33′N 2°0′W	North Sea	
57°41′N 2°0′W	United Kingdom	Scotland
57°18′N 2°0′W	North Sea	Passing just east of Aberdeen, Scotland, United Kingdom (at 25°8′N 2°5′W)
55°46′N 2°0′W	United Kingdom	England — passing through Berwick-upon-Tweed (at 55°46′N 2°0′W) and western Birmingham (at 52°40′N 2°0′W)
50°36′N 2°0′W	English Channel	Passing just west of the Cotentin Peninsula, France (at 49°42′N 1°57′W); Passing just east of the island of Jersey (at 49°12′N 2°1′W)
48°40′N 2°0′W	France	
46°44′N 2°0′W	Atlantic Ocean	Bay of Biscay
43°19′N 2°0′W	Spain	Passing just west of San Sebastián (at 43°19′N 1°59′W)
36°51′N 2°0′W	Mediterranean Sea	Alboran Sea
35°5′N 2°0′W	Algeria	
34°56′N 2°0′W	Morocco	
32°9′N 2°0′W	Algeria	
23°12′N 2°0′W	Mali	
14°35′N 2°0′W	Burkina Faso	
10°59′N 2°0′W	Ghana	
4°45′N 2°0′W	Atlantic Ocean	
60°0′S 2°0′W	Southern Ocean	
69°53′S 2°0′W	Antarctica	Queen Maud Land — claimed by Norway

== Ordnance Survey of Great Britain ==
The British national grid reference system uses the point 49°N 2°W as its true origin.

== See also ==
- 1st meridian west
- 3rd meridian west
