= 2nd meridian east =

Line of longitude

2nd meridian east

The meridian 2° east of Greenwich is a line of longitude that extends from the North Pole across the Arctic Ocean, the Atlantic Ocean, Europe, Africa, the Southern Ocean, and Antarctica to the South Pole.

The 2nd meridian east forms a great ellipse with the 178th meridian west.

== From Pole to Pole ==
Starting at the North Pole and heading south to the South Pole, the 2nd meridian east passes through:

Co-ordinates	Country, territory or sea	Notes
90°0′N 2°0′E	Arctic Ocean	
81°32′N 2°0′E	Atlantic Ocean	
61°0′N 2°0′E	North Sea	Passing just east of Lowestoft, England
51°0′N 2°0′E	France	Passing just west of Paris
42°27′N 2°0′E	Spain	Llívia exclave - for about 1km
42°26′N 2°0′E	France	For about 9km
42°22′N 2°0′E	Spain	Passing just west of Barcelona
41°16′N 2°0′E	Mediterranean Sea	
36°34′N 2°0′E	Algeria	
20°15′N 2°0′E	Mali	
15°19′N 2°0′E	Niger	Passing just west of Niamey
12°44′N 2°0′E	Burkina Faso	
11°25′N 2°0′E	Benin	
6°17′N 2°0′E	Atlantic Ocean	
60°0′S 2°0′E	Southern Ocean	
69°57′S 2°0′E	Antarctica	Queen Maud Land, claimed by Norway

Next westward: 1st meridian east	2nd meridian east forms a great circle with 178th meridian west	Next eastward: 3rd meridian east
