= Kure Atoll =

Atoll of the Hawaiian Islands

Native name: Hōlanikū (Hawaiian); or; Mokupāpapa (Hawaiian)
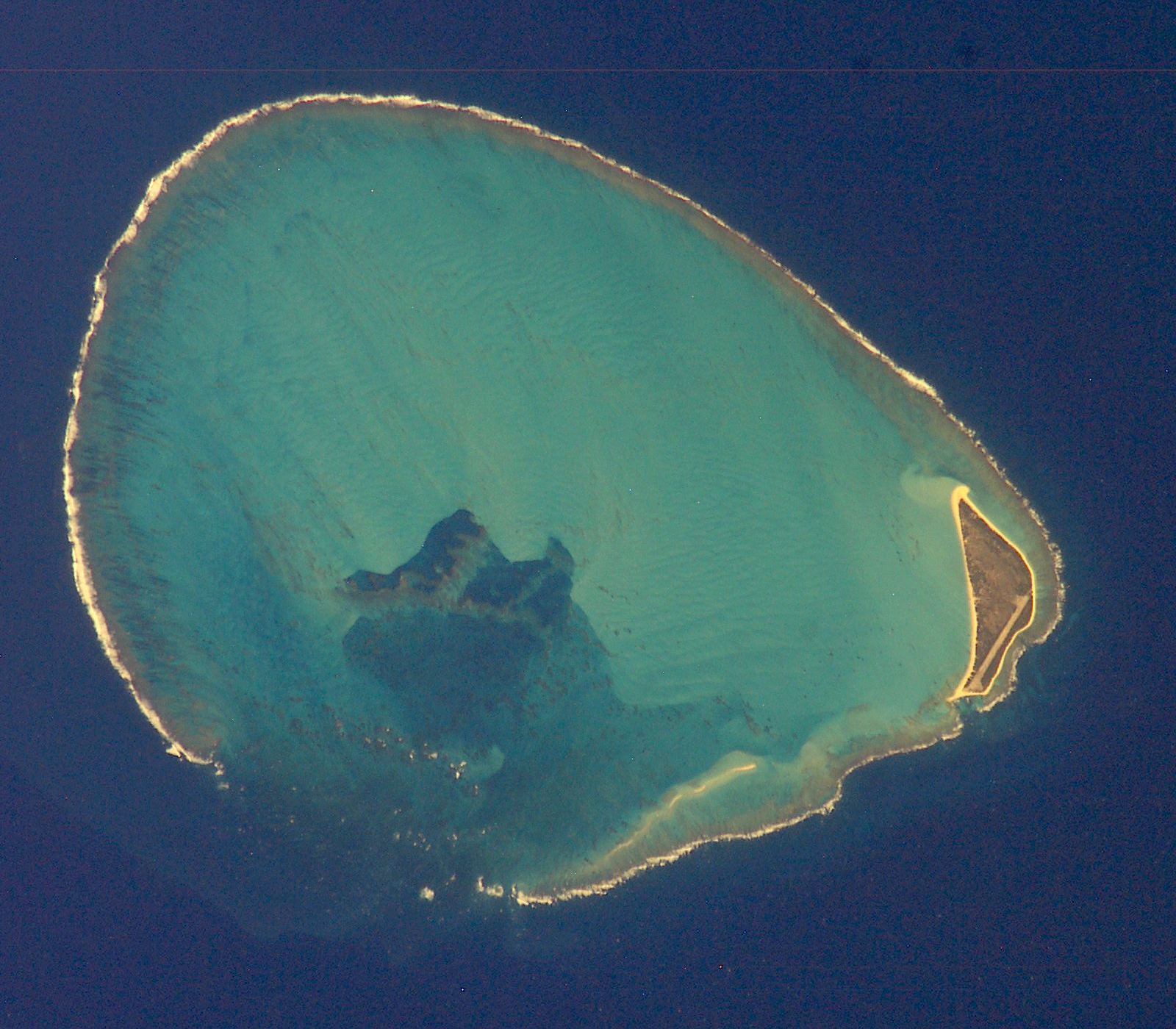
- Satellite image of Kure Atoll (north is towards the upper-left corner)

- Location within North Pacific Location within Hawaiian Islands

Geography
- Location: Pacific Ocean
- Coordinates: 28°25′N 178°20′W
- Archipelago: Northwestern Hawaiian Islands
- Total islands: 2
- Major islands: Green Island
- Area: 0.884 km^{2} (0.341 sq mi)
- Length: 5.8 mi (9.3 km)
- Width: 4.8 mi (7.7 km)

Administration
- United States
- State: Hawaii
- County: Honolulu County

Demographics
- Population: 0 (2025)

Additional information
- Time zone: UTC−10

Kure Atoll (/ˈkʊəriː/; Hawaiian: Hōlanikū, lit. 'bringing forth heaven'; Mokupāpapa, 'flat island') or Ocean Island is an atoll in the Pacific Ocean 48 nautical miles (89 km; 55 mi) west-northwest of Midway Atoll in the Northwestern Hawaiian Islands at 28°25′N 178°20′W. A coral ring 6 miles (9.7 km) across encloses a lagoon several meters deep. The atoll's largest island is called Green Island, and is a habitat for hundreds of thousands of seabirds in the present day and wildlife staff. A short, unused, and unmaintained runway and a portion of one building, both from a former United States Coast Guard LORAN station, are located on the island. Politically, it is part of Hawaii, though the nearest island is Midway, which is a separate unorganized territory. Kure Atoll, in addition to being the nesting grounds for tens of thousands of seabirds, has recorded several vagrant terrestrial birds, including snow bunting, eyebrowed thrush, brambling, olive-backed pipit, black kite, Steller's sea eagle and Chinese sparrowhawk. It is currently managed as a Wildlife Bird Sanctuary by the State of Hawaii's Department of Land and Natural Resource—Division of Forestry and Wildlife as one of the co-trustees of Papahānaumokuākea Marine National Monument with support from the Kure Atoll Conservancy. Kure is one of the westernmost islands of the Northwestern Hawaiian Islands.

Kure is seasonally inhabited by small crews of two to eight volunteers and biologists who work to restore and manage the native ecosystem.

Kure was discovered in the early 19th century and was the site of several shipwrecks. In the early 20th century it became a bird nature reserve of the United States. In the late 20th century, it was home to a radio base that supported location finding (LORAN system before GPS), and in the 21st century it is mostly a nature reserve and for scientific research. Kure, or sometimes written Cure, used to be called Ocean Island up until 1924 when it was renamed; in 1987 this changed to Kure Atoll (atoll rather than island). There are also several native Hawaiian names; some depend on context. Moku Papapa is the generic name for a flat island like this atoll but became more associated with it, and another one is Hōlanikū.

There are no more islands to the west until Japan. Though historically it was thought there might be, none were confirmed (see phantom islands such as the Byer's/Morrell's islands and the Anson Archipelago). To the west and south, across a great amount of ocean, are the Bonin and Volcano Islands (such as Iwo Jima); to the southwest are Minamitorishima and Wake Island. The Aleutian island chain that extends out from Alaska lies far to the north. The nearest feature to the west, but below sea level, is Hancock Seamount. The submerged Hawaiian–Emperor seamount chain continues to the northwest. Kure is the farthest west and north island of the Hawaiian chain above sea level in the present day. Other underwater features in the region include the Mid-Pacific Mountains to the south, and to the north, the Hess rise (underwater features).

Hess bank to the north has the historical undersea feature the Mellish bank.

== History ==
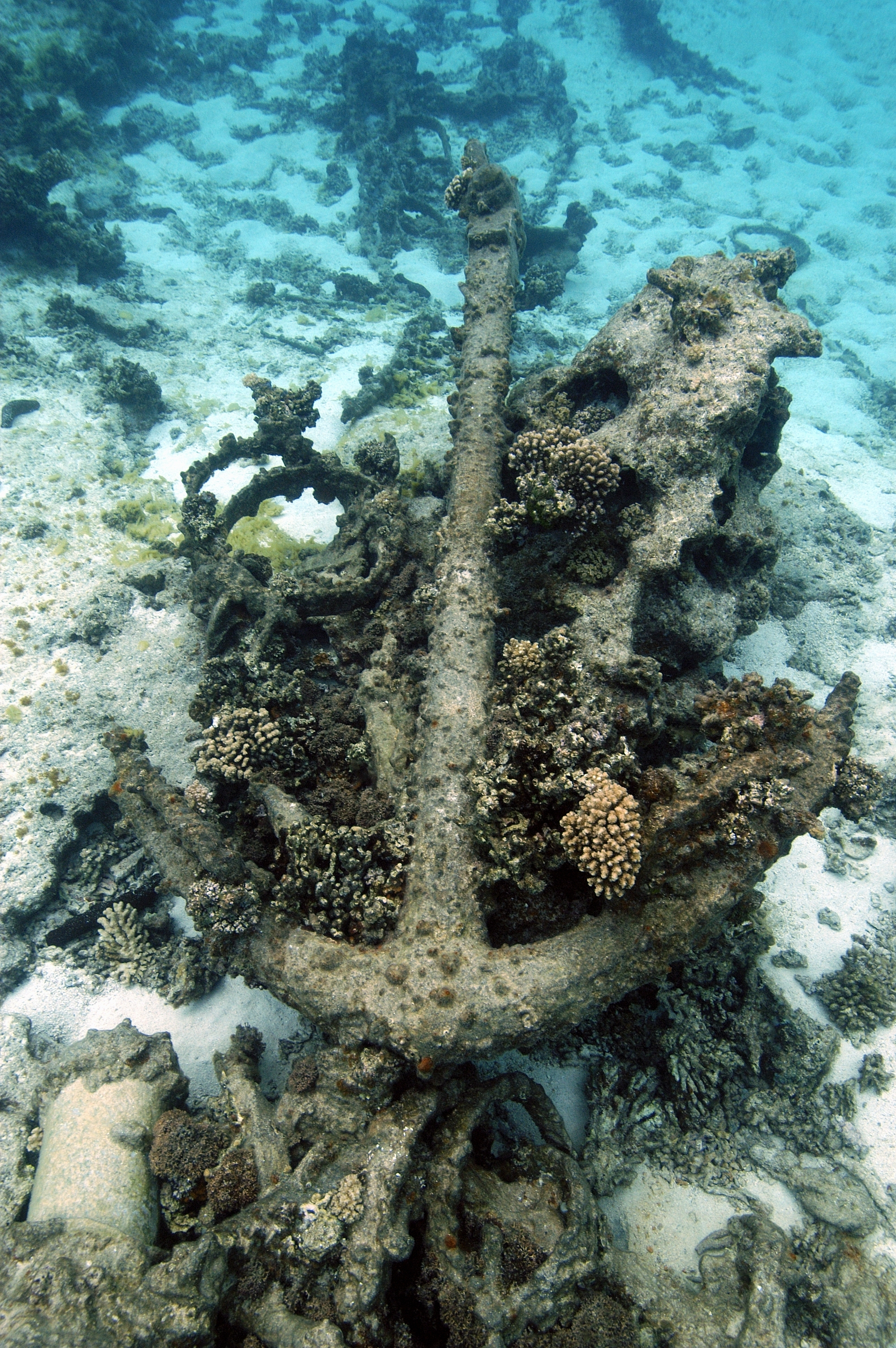
Anchor from the ship Parker photographed in 2005, lost in 1842

The island was discovered in the early 19th century, and besides from shipwrecks was only occasionally visited. From the 1960s to 1992, it had LORAN radio station, which had a small staff and an airstrip. It has been a nature reserve since that time, and marine debris cleanup and scientific research on the nature is conducted.

In the Hawaiian language the term Mokupāpapa was used for any flat island with reefs. The northwestern islands are associated with Kāne Milohaʻi in Hawaiian mythology, the brother of Pele, creator of the islands, who was left to stand guard for travelers. Another Hawaiian name for Kure Atoll is Hōlanikū, meaning "bringing forth heaven."

=== 19th century ===
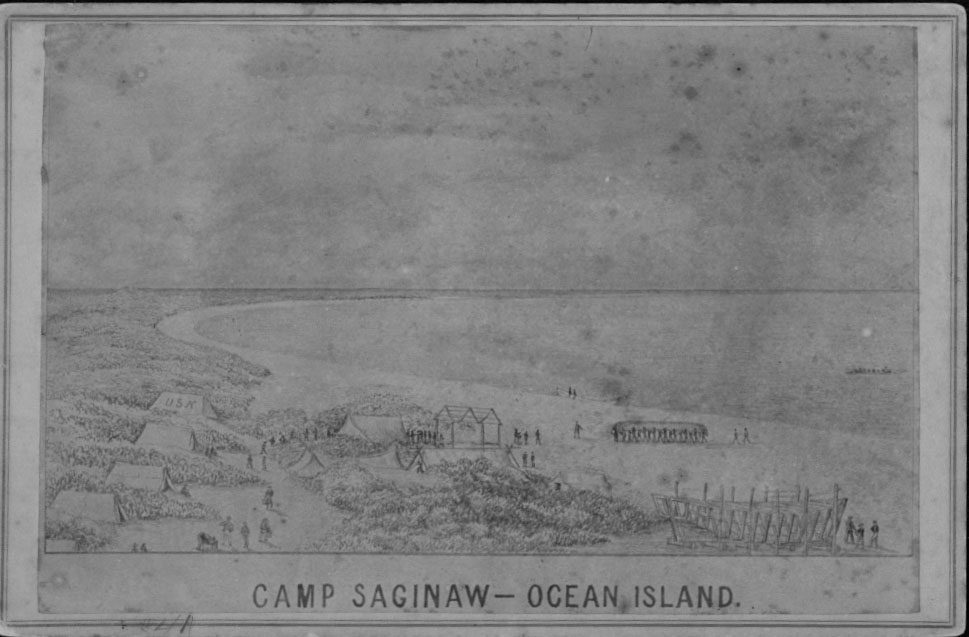
The camp from survivors of Saginaw, which shipwrecked in 1870. At the time it was called Ocean Island.

Before the mid-19th century, Kure Atoll was visited by several ships and given new names each time. Sometimes spelled Cure, its English name was for a Russian navigator who sighted the atoll. It was officially named Kure Island in 1924 and then Kure Atoll in 1987. The old name for the island was Ocean Island.

Two shipwrecks in the early 19th century were the Gledstanes and the Parker, in 1837 and 1842 respectively. The Gledstanes crewmembers were able to make it to the island and then were able to build a new vessel from the debris of their old ship. Some of the survivors then sailed it back to mainland Hawaii. Once they reached Hawaii, they sent a ship back to rescue those who had stayed behind on the island. The shipwreck of the Gledstanes was found in 2008.

The Parker's crew had a somewhat more difficult time but did manage to get to land by floating on a raft for several days. They managed to survive on a diet of birds and other wildlife at the atoll, living on what is now Green island. They even encountered the dog from the Gledstanes who had been living wild on the island in the previous years. They attempted to make contact with the outside world by attaching messages to seabirds. The Parker had shipwrecked in September 1842 and having lived at Kure Atoll, many of the crew were finally rescued on April 16, 1843, with the remainder taken off on May 2, 1843. The first rescue ship was the James Stewart and the second rescue ship was the whaler Nassau.

Many crews were stranded on Kure Atoll after being shipwrecked on the surrounding reefs and had to survive on the local seals, turtles, and birds. The shipwrecks remain on the reef today, including the USS Saginaw. Because of these incidents, King Kalākaua sent Colonel J. H. Boyd to Kure as his Special Commissioner. On September 20, 1886, he took possession of the island for the Hawaiian government. The King ordered that a crude house be built on the island, with tanks for holding water and provisions for any other unfortunates who might be cast away there. However, the provisions were stolen within a year and the house soon fell into ruin.

In 1867, the USS Lackawanna surveyed the atoll to produce more accurate charts of the reefs.

The USS Saginaw was wrecked on the atoll in October 1870. The crew was able to abandon ship, but not much was saved. A crew of five sailed the captain's gig to the island of Kauai, but only one survived the difficult month-long voyage. Despite this, word did get to the authorities, who sent a rescue ship to the stranded crew, which was able to rescue them in January 1871.

The vessel Dunnottar Castle shipwrecked in 1886, and the crew was able to reach Kauai eventually; however, some lives were lost.

=== 20th century ===
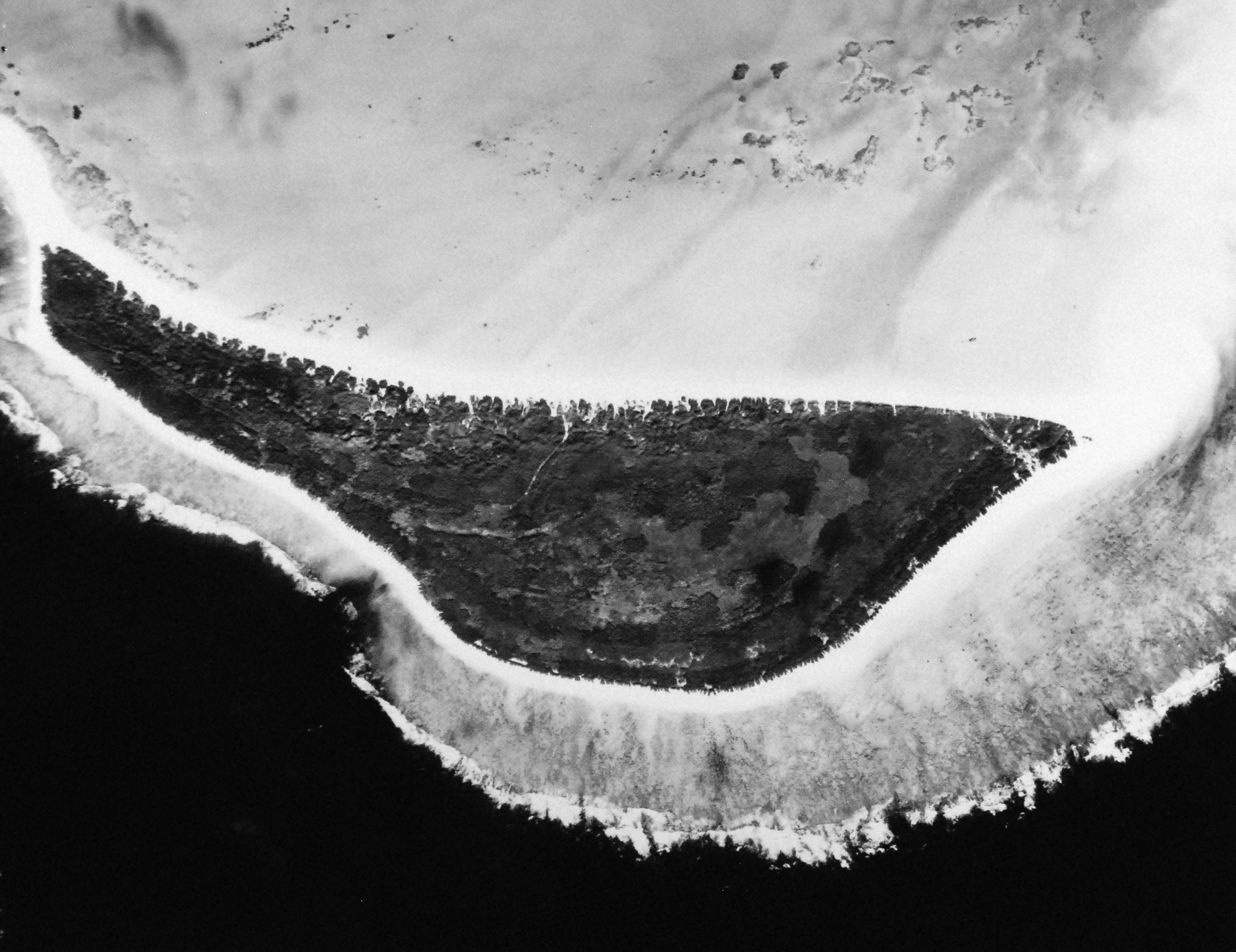
Kure's Green Island in October 1959

Largely neglected for most of its history, during World War II Kure was routinely visited by U.S. Navy patrols from nearby Midway to ensure that the Japanese were not using it to refuel submarines or flying boats from submarine-tankers for attacks elsewhere in the Hawaiian chain. During the Battle of Midway, a Japanese Nakajima B5N "Kate" bomber, operating from the aircraft carrier Hiryū, piloted by Lieutenant Kikuchi Rokurō, and which had been involved in the initial Japanese attack on Midway's US installations, crash-landed near Kure after being damaged by US fighters. Once ashore, Lt. Kikuchi and the two other members of his crew (Warrant Officer Yumoto Noriyoshi and Petty Officer (1st Class) Narasaki Hironori) refused capture and were either killed or committed suicide when an American landing party tried to capture them.

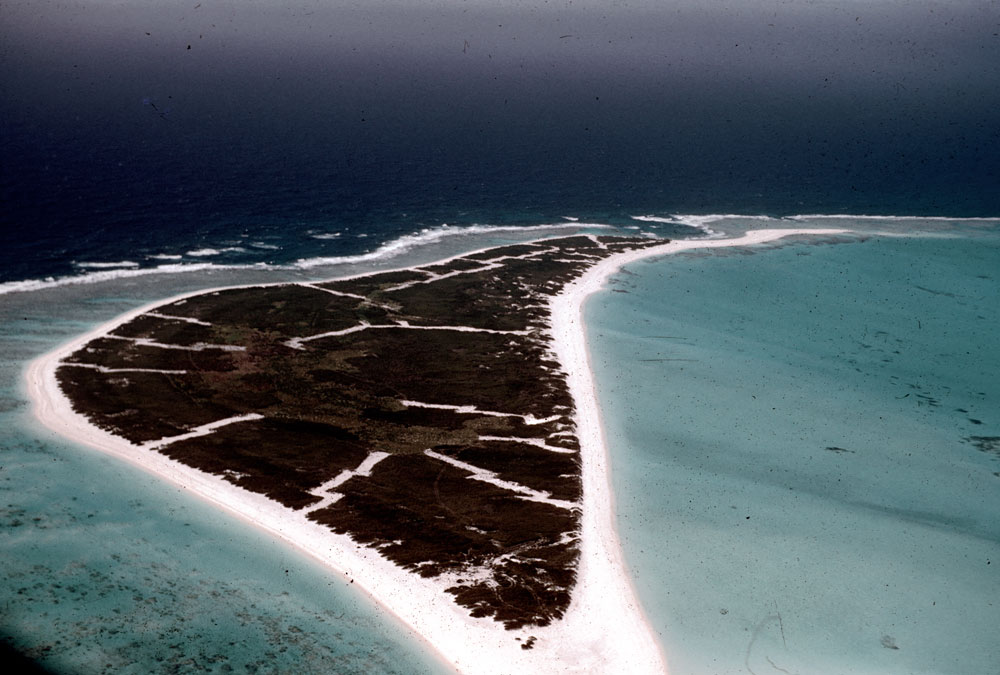
Green Island from the air, in late 1959 after strips were cleared for albatrosses

In the 1950s, there was a radar reflector on the island, and the island was also used for a scientific study of Pacific birds. In 1959 zig-zag stripes were cut through the groves of Scaevola bushes to make habitat space for albatrosses.

In 1960, construction began on a LORAN base and it was finished in 1961. Also in 1961, the tug Port of Bandon sank on the reef. The base included buildings for the LORAN station, a 625-foot-high (191 m) LORAN radio tower, and a 4,000-foot (1,200 m) airstrip.

Between 1963 and 1965, the Polynesian rat (Rattus exulans) population was studied.

In 1966, a Boeing 707 jet airliner made an emergency landing at Kure Atoll.

Kure is located within a major current which washes up debris from the Great Pacific Garbage Patch, such as fishing nets and large numbers of cigarette lighters, on the island. These pose threats to the local animals, especially birds, whose skeletons are frequently found with plastic in the stomach cavity.

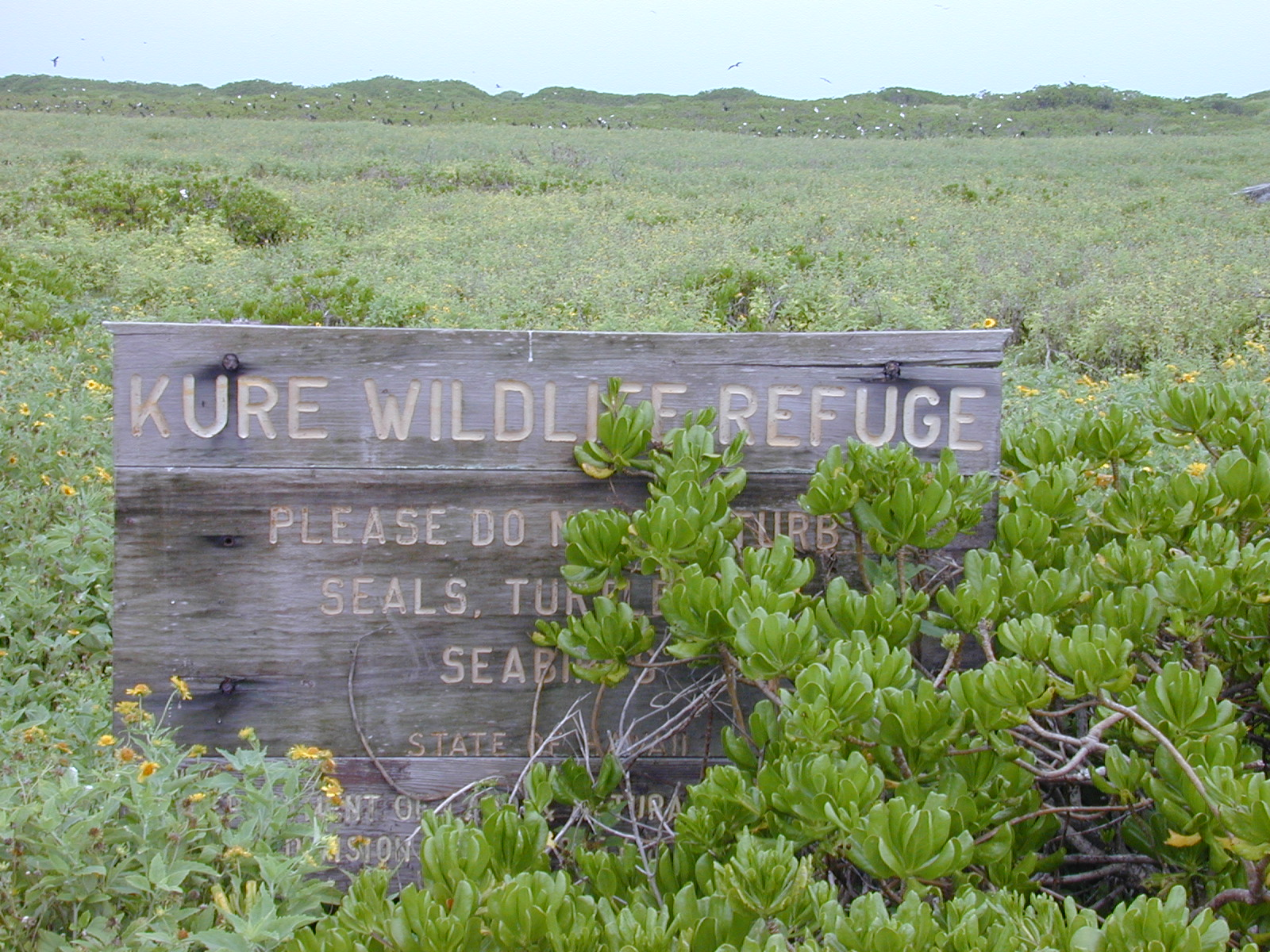
Kure Atoll sign, 2001

On October 16, 1998, the longline fishing vessel Paradise Queen II ran aground on the eastern edge of Green Island of Kure Atoll, spilling approximately 4,000 gallons of diesel fuel before recovery operations could commence. Debris from that shipwreck continued to pollute the reef and shoreline for many years, endangering wildlife and damaging the coral reef. The long-term impact of this and other wrecks within the Northwestern Hawaiian Islands (NWHI) highlight the dangers to sensitive habitats in the area. To help ensure their protection, the Papahānaumokuākea Marine National Monument was designated a Particularly Sensitive Sea Area (PSSA) in 2008 by the International Maritime Organization. In addition to avoiding specific areas, owners must identify when their ship enters and leaves the PSSA's 10-nautical-mile-wide (12 mi; 19 km) reporting area so a timely response can be taken should there be a maritime emergency.

From 1960 to 1992, a United States Coast Guard LORAN station was located on Green Island. A short coral runway was built on the island to support Coast Guard operations, but it was abandoned and is currently unusable. Although there is no permanent human population, the atoll is formally part of the City and County of Honolulu. It became a state wildlife sanctuary in 1981. Since 1993, the Hawaii Department of Land and Natural Resources and volunteers from the Kure Atoll Conservancy group have helped to restore the atoll to a more natural state. Jean-Michel Cousteau produced a video on a voyage to Kure which first aired in 2006. Since 2010 the Division of Forestry and Wildlife has had a year-round presence on Kure Atoll.

=== 21st century ===
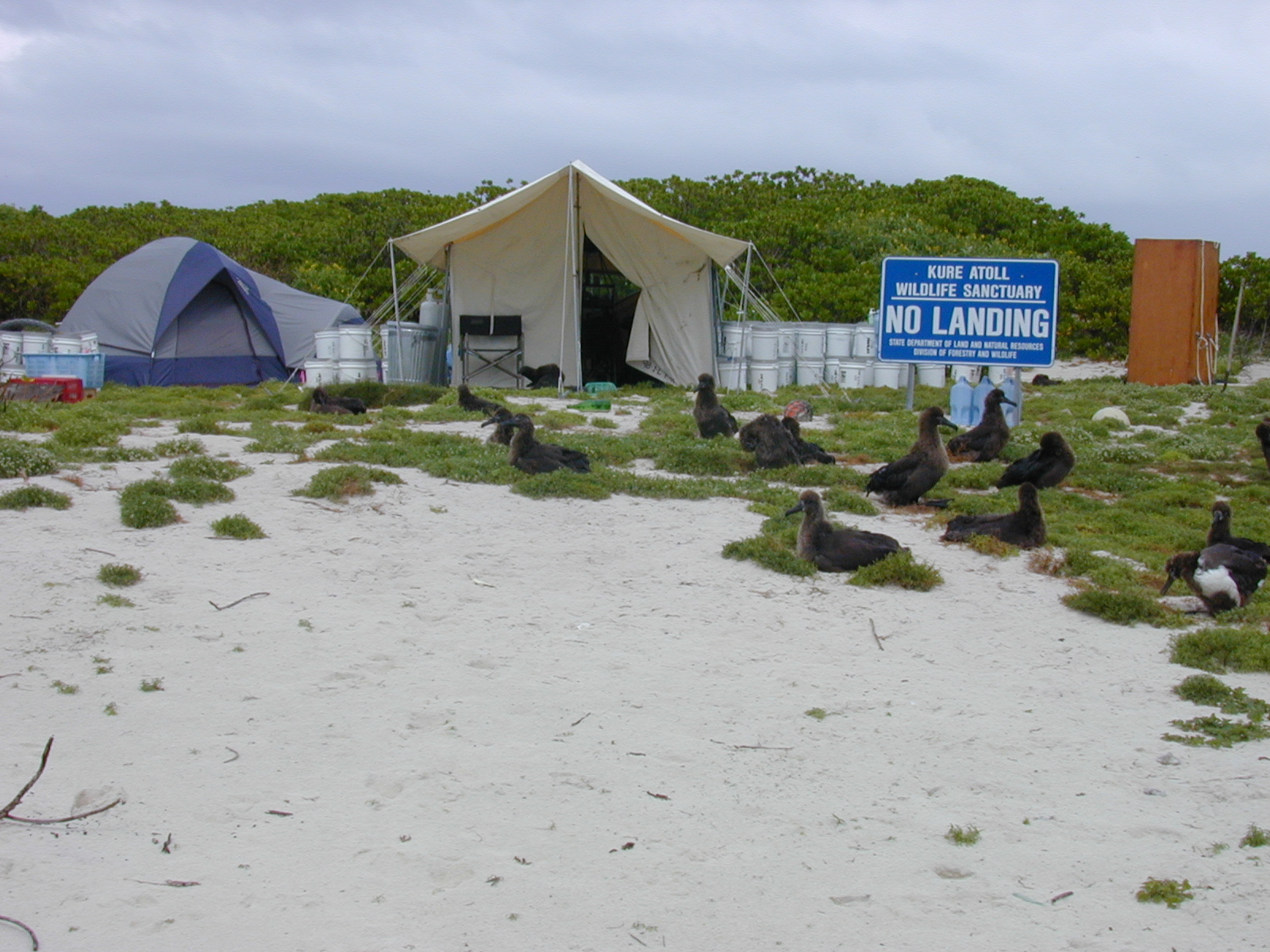
Volunteer tents and albatrosses at Kure, 2001

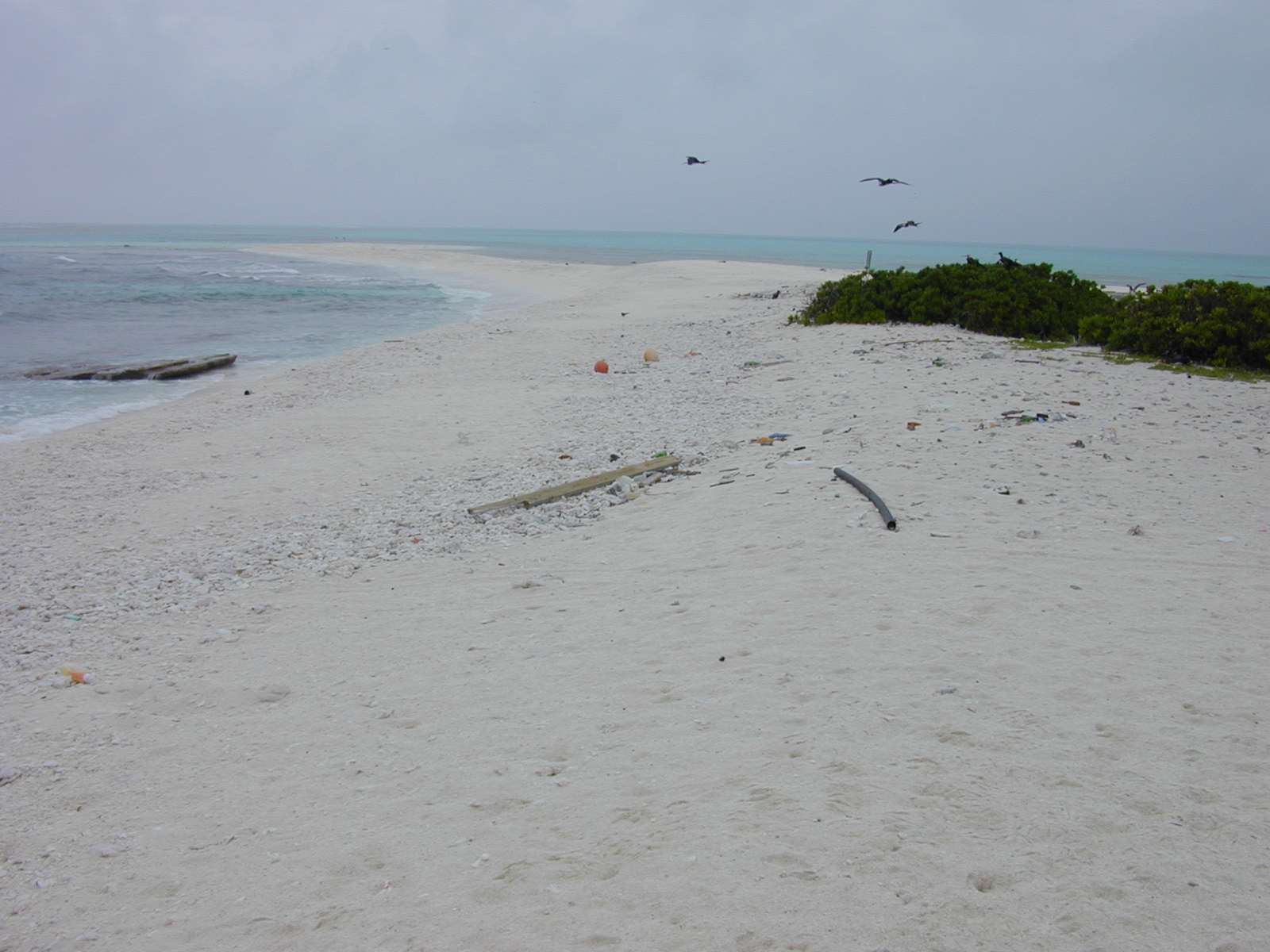
Landing area

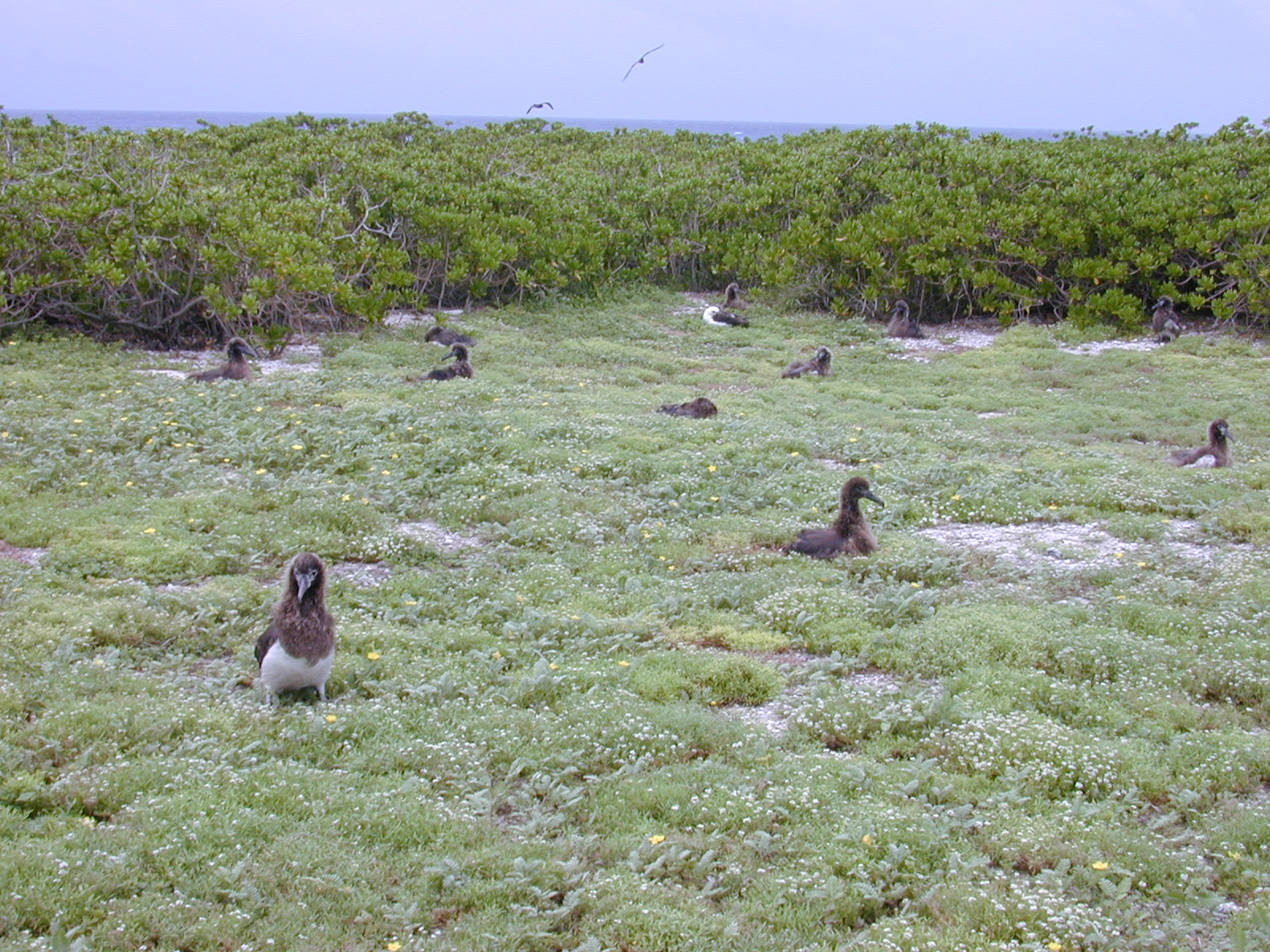
Birds and natural flora inland

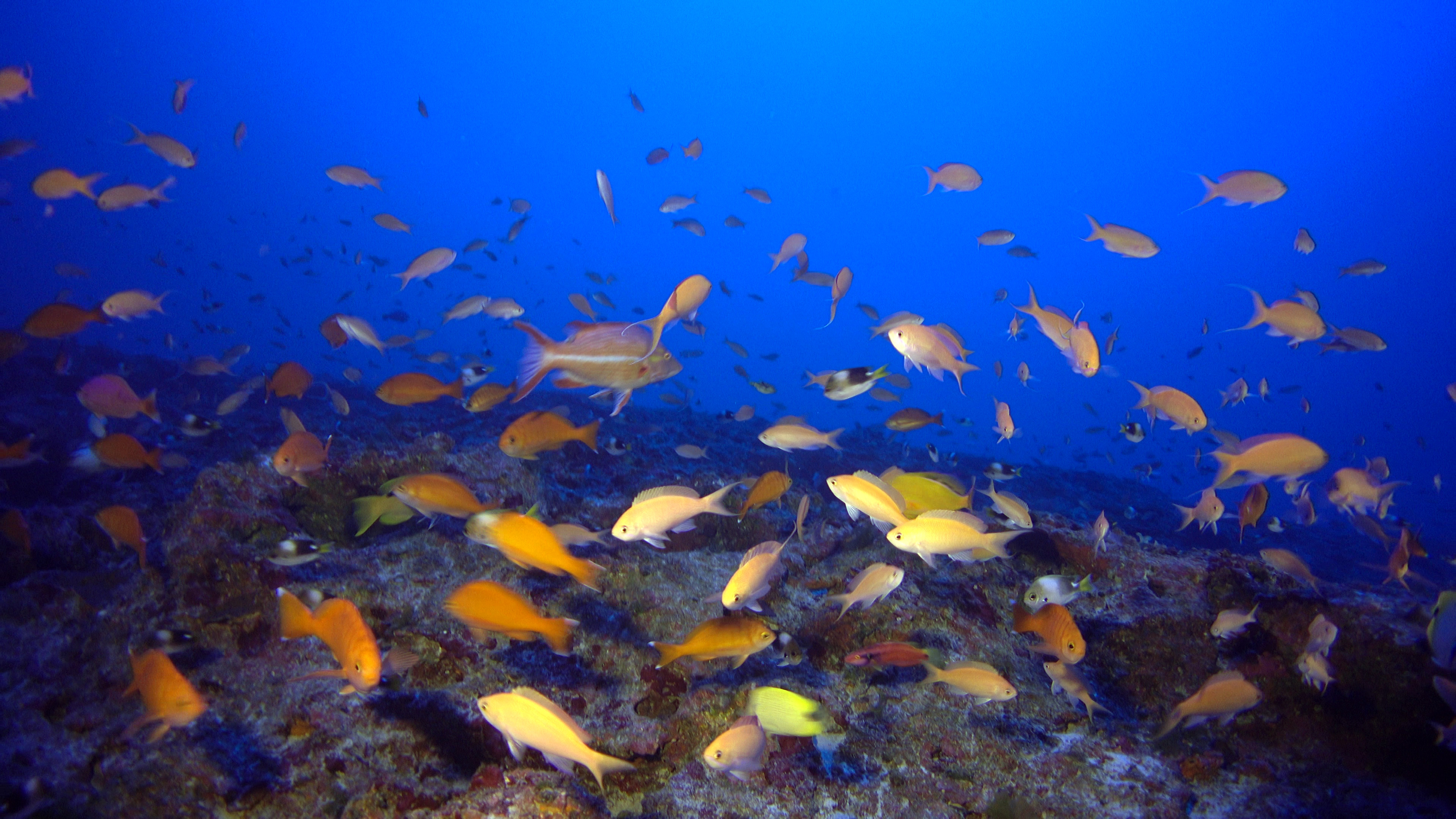
Fish swim at Kure Atoll

In 2002, the wreck of a 19th-century whaling ship was found at Kure Atoll. This wreck was further explored in 2005, 2006, and 2008; it is thought it may be the wreck of the sailing ship Parker. The Parker was a whaling ship that wrecked on Kure Atoll in 1842. The crew was rescued after a few months.

The wreck of the USS Saginaw was found in 2003. The research dive studying the wreck was featured in the book A Civil War Gunboat in Pacific Waters: Life on Board USS Saginaw.

In 2008, the shipwreck of the vessel Gledstanes was found. The Gledstanes was a British whaling ship that wrecked in 1837.

In 2010, the wreck of a sailboat was recovered from Kure Atoll. The sailboat was discovered in 2007, and was determined to be the boat of a sailor who departed from Fiji in 2006, but was lost at sea.

In 2020, a crew of four stayed on the island from February through October. While there is no television or cell phone service, limited internet connectivity allows for emails to be sent and received. The island is occupied by two crews each year that are rotated in and out. Their job is to keep an eye on the island, and they also try to clean up trash that washes up on the island.

In the 2020s, removing ghost nets and marine debris from Kure and other northwest Hawaiian islands remains a big concern, which are known to endanger wildlife and pollute the environment.

== Geography and ecology ==
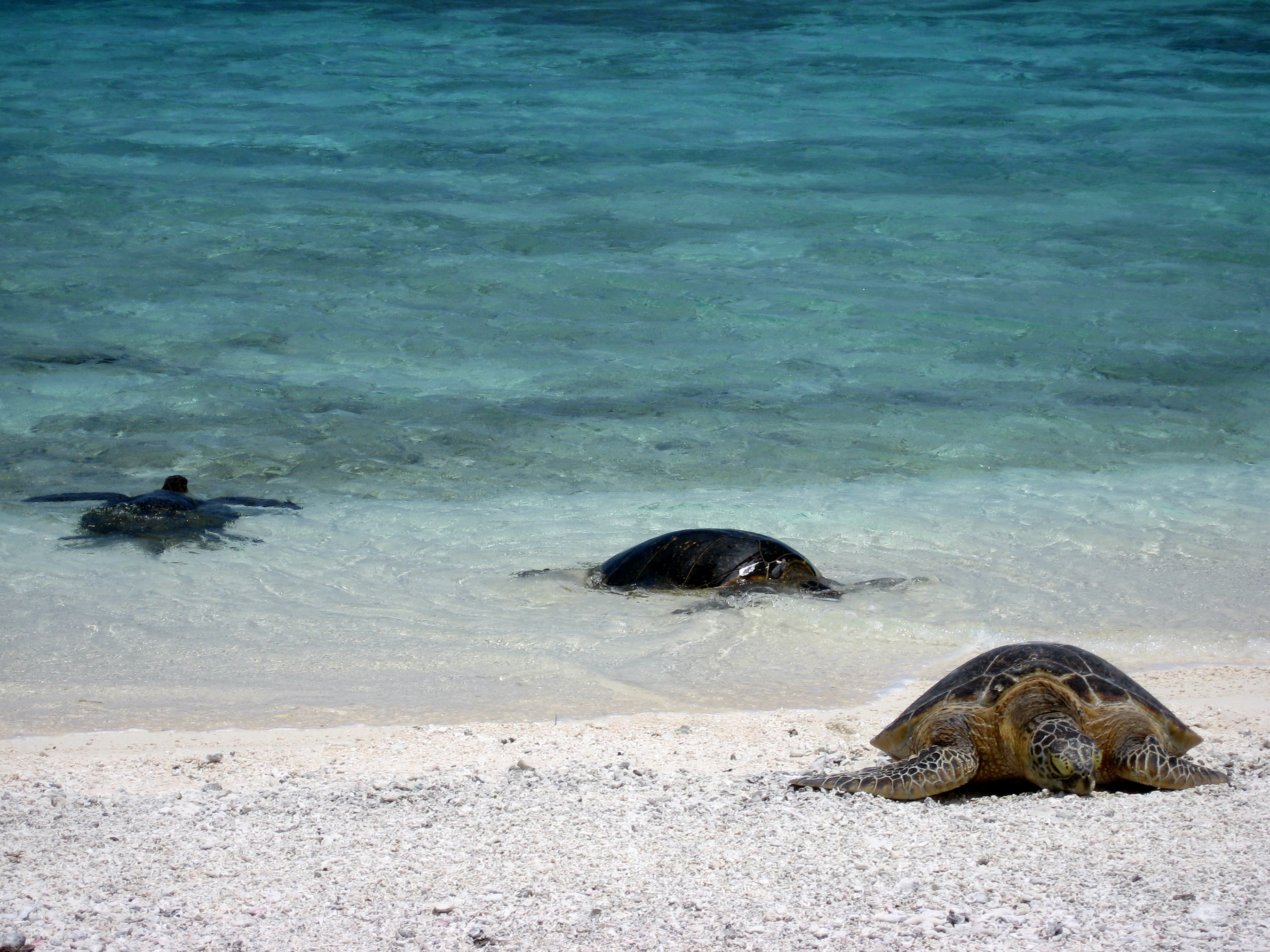
Some green sea turtles come ashore on a Kure Atoll beach

The International Date Line lies approximately 100 miles (87 nmi; 160 km) to the west. Although located to the west of Midway Atoll, Kure Atoll has a time zone 1 hour ahead at UTC−10:00 (the same as the rest of Hawaii). Kure is the northernmost coral atoll in the world. It consists of a 6-mile-wide (9.7 km) nearly circular barrier reef surrounding a shallow lagoon and several sand islets. There is a total land area of 213.097 acres (86.237 ha), with Green Island on the southeast side. A growing number of Hawaiian monk seals (Monachus schauinslandi) haul out on its beaches. The Polynesian rat (Rattus exulans) has been on the island since it was discovered.

The coral reef is a rough ring shape about 6 miles (9.7 km) across and has two islands within, Sand Island and Green Island. Green Island is in the southeast quadrant of the ring, with an area of 235 acres. Sand Island is about one acre in size and lies to the west of Green Island. Sand Island is not known to have plant life.

Green Island has a wide variety of vegetation including groves of beach naupaka (Scaevola taccada), which are a popular habitat for birds. Another type of tree on Green Island is the heliotrope tree (Tournefortia argentea), there are two groves of ironwood trees (Casuarina equisetifolia), and other common plants are Verbesina and Bermuda grass. A survey of plant life in 2001 counted about 50 different species of plant on Green Island.

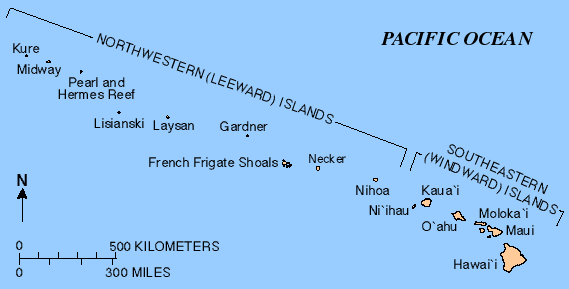
Map showing the location of Kure Atoll on the western end of the Hawaiian island chain

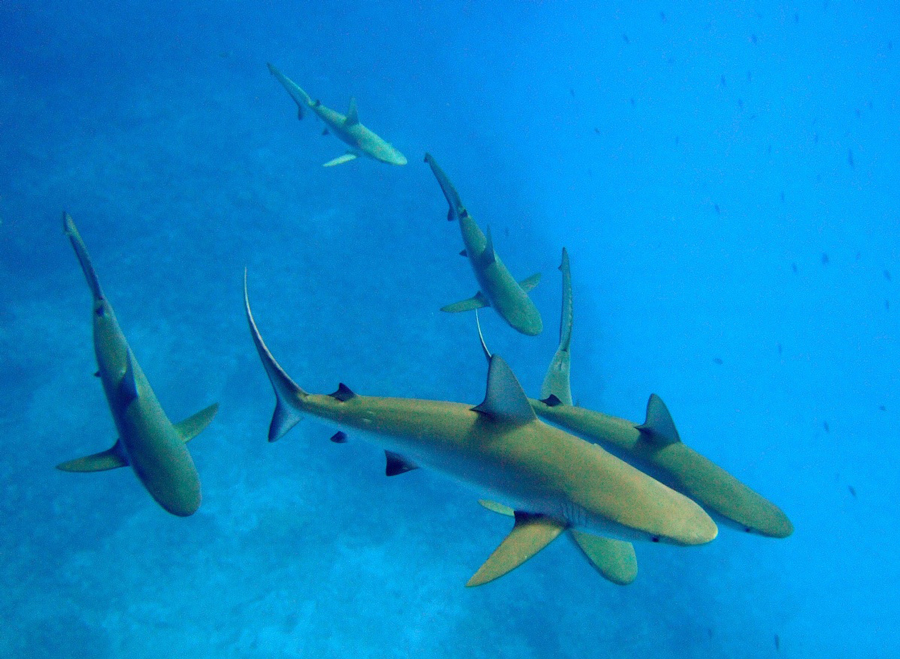
Grey reef sharks in the waters of Kure Atoll, 2012

Green Island is roughly triangular with a point to the north and with a northwest beach extending down to a western point. The east side arcs down from north point and the shore includes east beach, southeast beach, and south beach, which arcs around to West point on the south side of the island. Overall Green Island is 1.5 miles (2.4 km) long and up to 0.5 miles (0.80 km) wide. The highest point is 25 feet (7.6 m).

Seabirds known to be at Kure in one survey:

- Black-footed albatross (Diomedea nigripes)
- Laysan albatross (Diomedea immutabilis)
- Wedge-tailed shearwater (Pufinus pacificlcs)
- Red-tailed tropic-bird (Phaethon rubricauda)
- Blue-faced booby (Sula dactylatra)
- Brown booby (Sula Leucogaster)
- Red-footed booby (Sula sula)
- Great frigate-bird (Fregata minor)
- Gray-backed tern (Sterna lunata)
- Sooty tern (Sterna fuscata)
- Noddy tern (Anous stolidus)
- White-capped noddy tern (Anous minutus)
- White tern (Gygis alba)

As of 2002, 92 species of algae have been discovered in the central lagoon of Kure Atoll.

=== Climate ===
Temperatures at Kure Atoll range from about 45 to 90 °F (7–32 °C). There is usually a wind of about 10–15 mph (16–24 km/h) that blows from the northeast trade winds.

The data chart below is taken from Midway Atoll due to a lack of any weather stations present on Kure Atoll.

Kure Atoll features a tropical savanna climate (Köppen Aw) with high year-round temperatures. Rainfall is evenly distributed throughout the year, with only two months being able to be classified as dry season months (May and June).

Climate data for Kure Atoll
Month	Jan	Feb	Mar	Apr	May	Jun	Jul	Aug	Sep	Oct	Nov	Dec	Year
Record high °F (°C)	80 (27)	81 (27)	81 (27)	82 (28)	87 (31)	89 (32)	92 (33)	92 (33)	92 (33)	89 (32)	88 (31)	82 (28)	92 (33)
Mean daily maximum °F (°C)	70 (21)	70 (21)	71 (22)	72 (22)	76 (24)	81 (27)	83 (28)	84 (29)	84 (29)	80 (27)	76 (24)	73 (23)	77 (25)
Daily mean °F (°C)	66 (19)	66 (19)	67 (19)	69 (21)	72 (22)	77 (25)	79 (26)	80 (27)	80 (27)	77 (25)	73 (23)	69 (21)	73 (23)
Mean daily minimum °F (°C)	62 (17)	62 (17)	63 (17)	64 (18)	68 (20)	73 (23)	75 (24)	75 (24)	75 (24)	72 (22)	69 (21)	65 (18)	69 (20)
Record low °F (°C)	49 (9)	50 (10)	51 (11)	53 (12)	55 (13)	61 (16)	63 (17)	64 (18)	64 (18)	59 (15)	55 (13)	51 (11)	49 (9)
Average precipitation inches (mm)	5.0 (130)	3.8 (97)	3.0 (76)	2.5 (64)	2.3 (58)	2.2 (56)	3.3 (84)	4.3 (110)	3.5 (89)	3.5 (89)	3.8 (97)	4.1 (100)	41.3 (1,050)
Average precipitation days	16	14	12	11	9	9	15	15	15	14	14	16	160
Source: Weatherbase

== Geological history and future ==
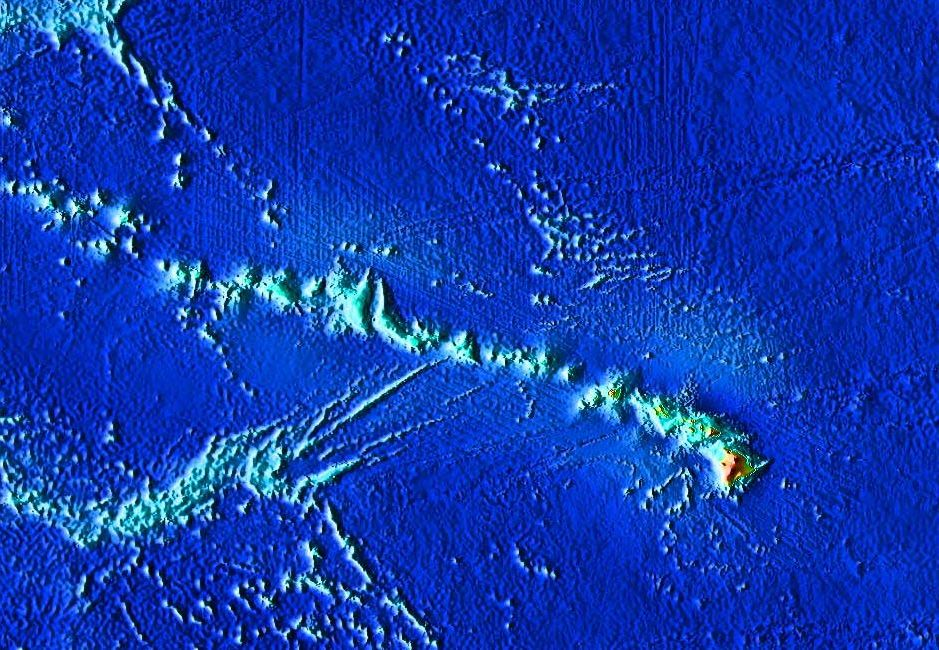
The Hawaiian-Emperor seamount chain, zoomed in on the modern-day islands

The geological history of Kure is generally similar to Midway, but Kure lies close to what is called the Darwin Point, the latitude north of which the rate of natural reef subsidence and destruction surpasses the rate of reef growth. At approximately 30 million years old, it is the oldest in the Hawaiian Island chain. As Kure continues to be slowly carried along to the northwest by the motion of the Pacific Plate, it will move into waters too cool for coral and coralline algae growth to keep up with isostatic subsidence of the mountain. Currently the atoll is warmed by the pools of water at the ends of the warm Kuroshio Current, keeping it in a very comfortable range in winter. Barring unforeseen evolution, it will then begin to join the other volcanic and reef-topped remnants of the Hawaiian–Emperor seamount chain to the northwest, all of which are now seamounts.

== Amateur radio ==
Because of its particularly remote location, Kure Atoll has been the scene of several amateur radio DX expeditions, or DX-peditions. Because the radio propagation path between Kure and Europe runs right over the North Polar region, opportunities for distant communication with Kure are particularly popular among European amateurs.

The callsign prefix for Kure Atoll as of 2017 is KH7K, and for nearby Midway Atoll KH4, on the DXCC list. They were briefly deleted from the DXCC list and had to be re-added after a review, due to a legal change of the overall regions status.

Some of the DXpeditions to Kure were:

- 1969 – Callsign: KH6NR/KH6 – From November 11 to November 14, 1969, Marine Staff Sergeant Don Chilcote, KH6GKV (now VE6NN), and Navy ICFN Gene Lewis, KH6HDB (now W5LE), operated from Kure Island, using the U.S. Navy Reserve Training Center, Honolulu's callsign.
- 1970 – Callsign: W7UXP/KH6 - October by WB2OIF, KH6HCM/W7UXP, KH6HGP/W7WOX
- 1971–72 – Callsign: KH6EDY—The U.S. Coast Guard Kure Island LORAN station's callsign.
- 1973–74 – Callsign: KH6HDB – From September 1973 to September 1974, Gene Lewis, KH6HDB (now W5LE), operated from Kure Island. Lewis had been one of the two operators to activate Kure during the one-week DXpedition of KH6NR/KH6 during November 1969. He subsequently joined the Coast Guard for the express purpose of getting to spend a one-year tour of duty on Kure Island.
- 1997 – Event call sign: K7K. This was a joint scientific/radio operation including four fish and wildlife scientists and the eight members of the Midway-Kure DX Foundation's 1996 Midway team. The team included four scientists from the United States Fish and Wildlife Service.
- 2005 – Event call sign: K7C. The team consisted of 12 amateur radio operators from the United States, Canada, and Germany.
- 2018 - the Pacific Island DX-pedition Group's 4th application since 2014 was rejected by the Hawaii Dept. of Land and Natural Resources, citing the inability to provide "adequate safeguards for the resources and ecological integrity" of Kure Atoll, despite successful Amateur Radio activations, with U.S. Fish and Wildlife representation, on Palmyra, Navassa, and Baker Islands with no harmful impact to those island habitats.

== LORAN Station (1960–1992) ==
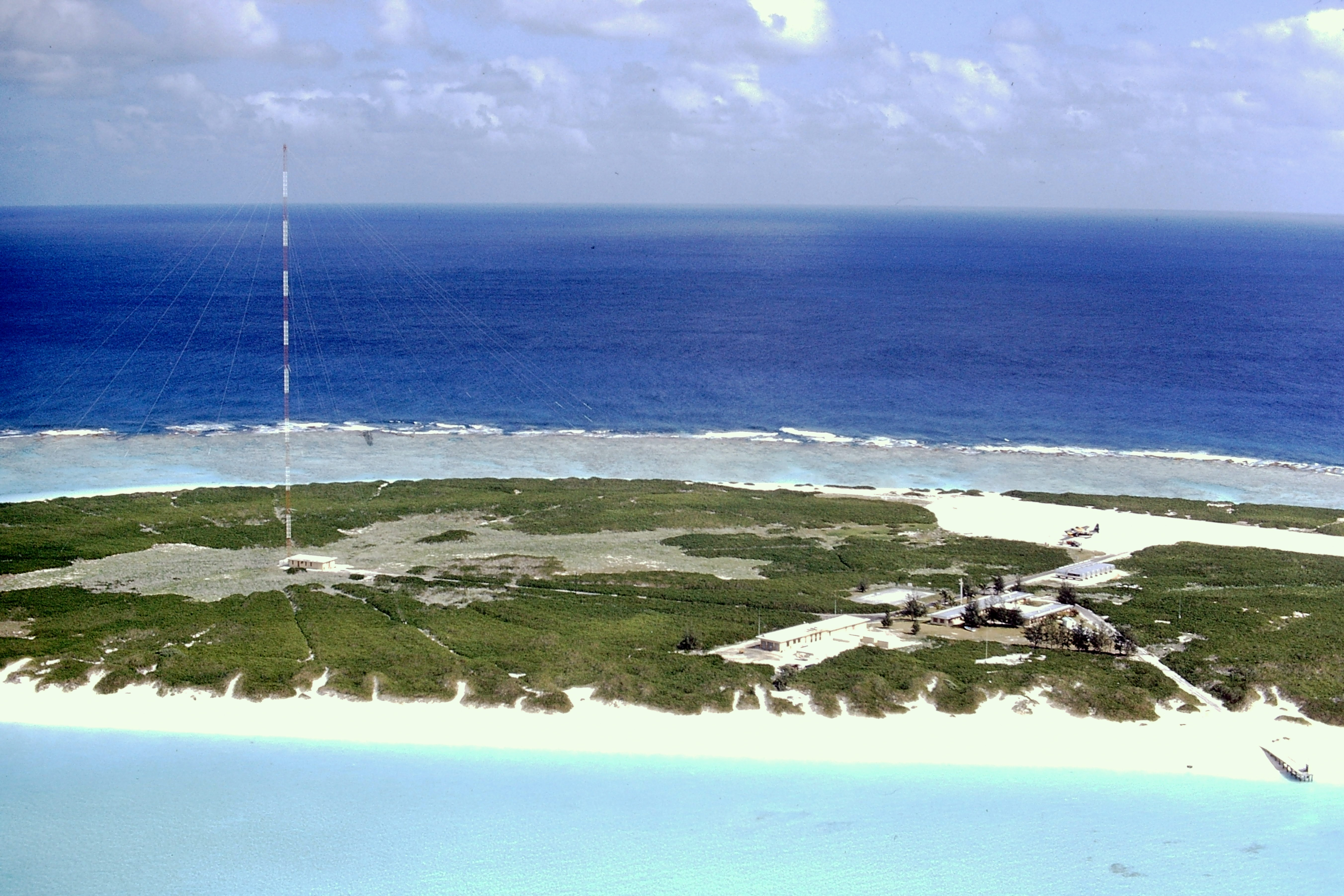
The United States Coast Guard LORAN station at Kure in 1971. A Grumman HU-16 Albatross can be seen parked on the runway's ramp.

Kure's Green Island was home to a radio geolocation station from the early 1960s to 1992. Called LORAN (short for LOng RAnge Navigation), the base was operated by the U.S. Coast Guard and supported the LORAN-C system. This land-based electronic navigation aid helped ships and aircraft locate themselves on the Earth's surface. This base was shut down because the LORAN system was superseded by the Global Positioning System (GPS), which uses satellites in Earth orbit rather than ground stations like at Kure Island. The LORAN station was commissioned on 18 March 1961 and was decommissioned on 2 July 1992.

Kure's LORAN base had a 625-foot-high (191 m) radio tower that was later demolished when operations ended.

The ham radio call sign for the Kure LORAN Station was KH6EDY.

The site was surveyed in 1959 and construction began in 1960. The survey team was attacked by rats in the night. The base was staffed by about 20–30 or so personnel, and the base received many awards over its history including the Coast Guard Unit Commendation in 1986–1989.

== Airstrip ==
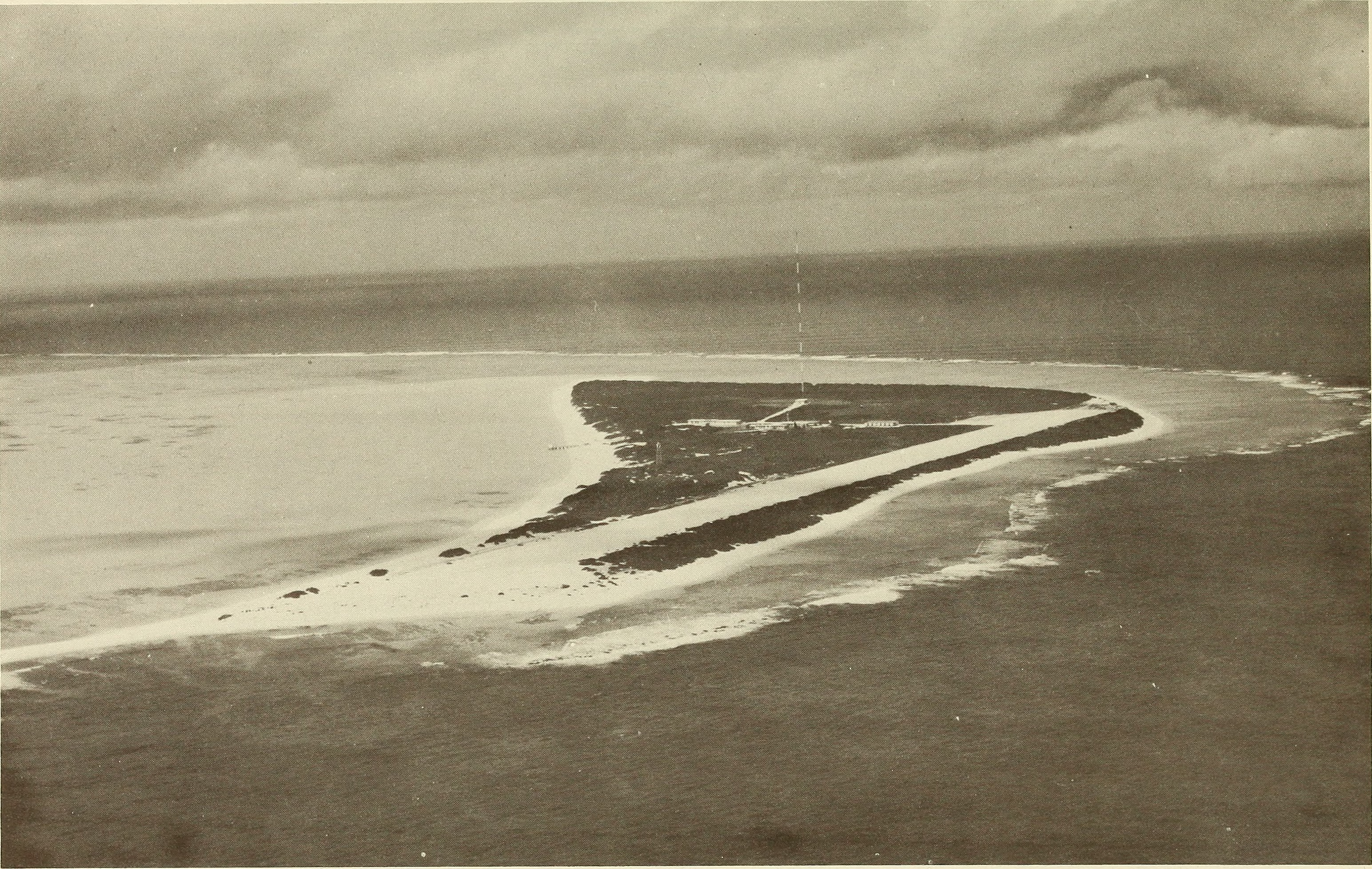
Green Island with the airstrip and radio location base, 1966

The Kure airport had one 3800-foot-long runway, which is now closed. Its ICAO code was PM64.

Aircraft that routinely operated from the airstrip included U.S. Coast Guard HC-123B Provider and HC-130H aircraft and several types of U.S. Navy fixed-wing aircraft and helicopters from Midway. Flights routinely carried mail, cargo, and passengers to Kure Atoll since its completion in the 1960s.

The airstrip was also known to have been used for emergency landings, including a Lockheed Constellation (C-121) in 1961 and a Boeing 707 in 1966.

== Shipwrecks ==
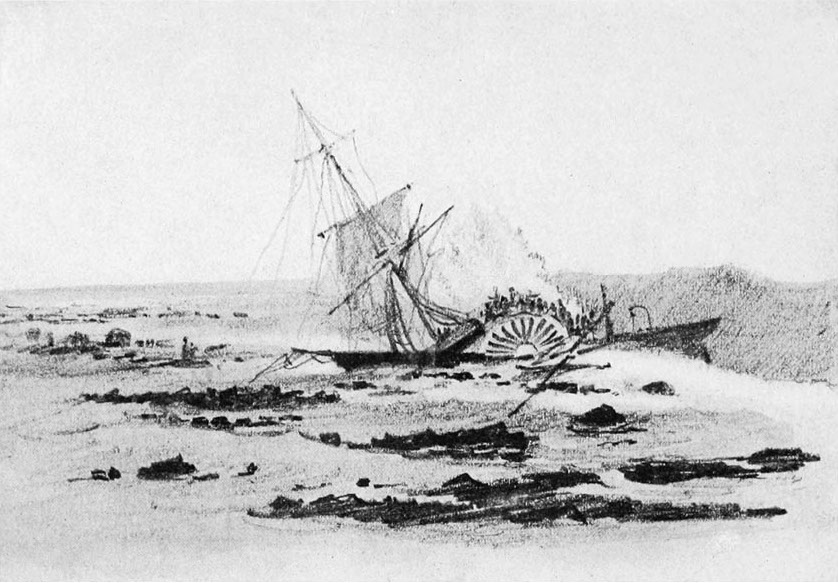
The Saginaw wrecks on the atoll in 1870. (drawing)

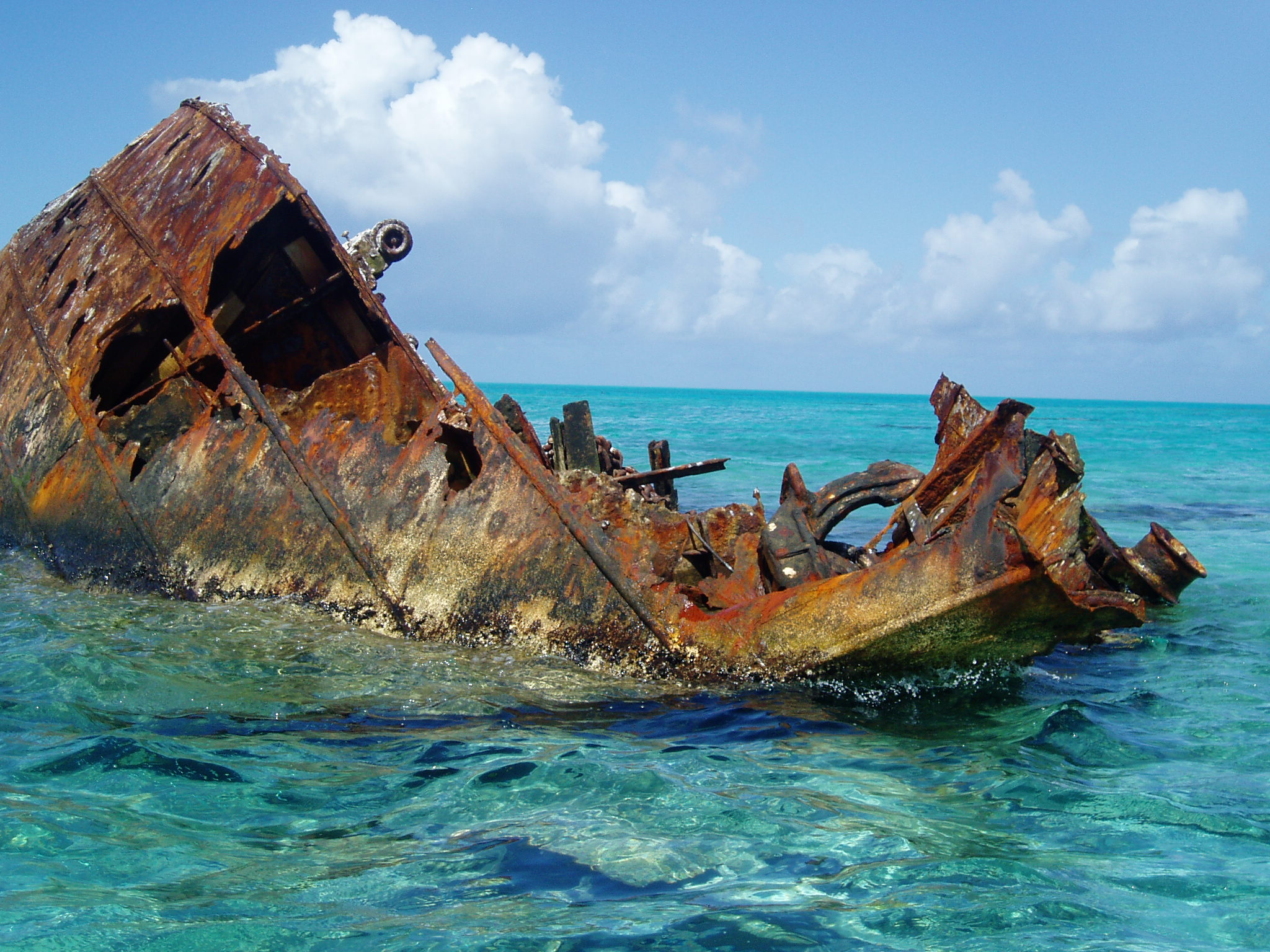
Wreck of Houei Maru, 2006

Kure Atoll is noted as the location of various shipwrecks. Some of the noted wrecks at the atoll include:

- 1837 Gledstanes
- 1842 Parker
- 1870 Saginaw
- 1886 Dunnottar Castle
- 1888 Ocean Pearl
- 1937 Statu Maru
- 1961 Port of Bandon
- 1976 Houei Maru

The wreck of the whaling ship Gledstanes was found in 2008. Many of the crews survived by living on Kure until they could leave the island.

== Gallery ==
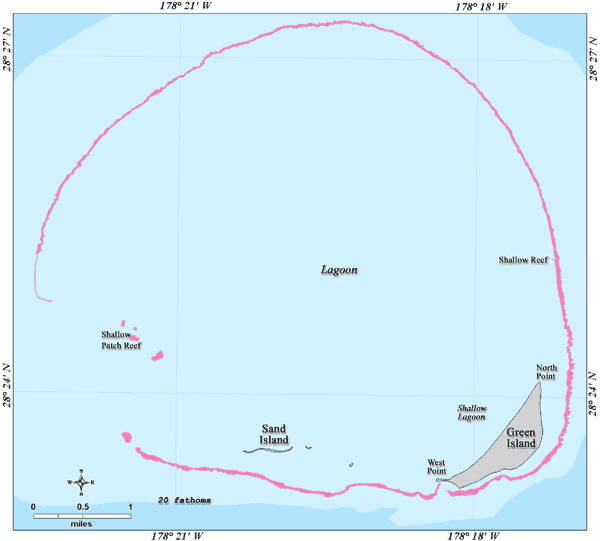
Bathymetric map of Kure Atoll

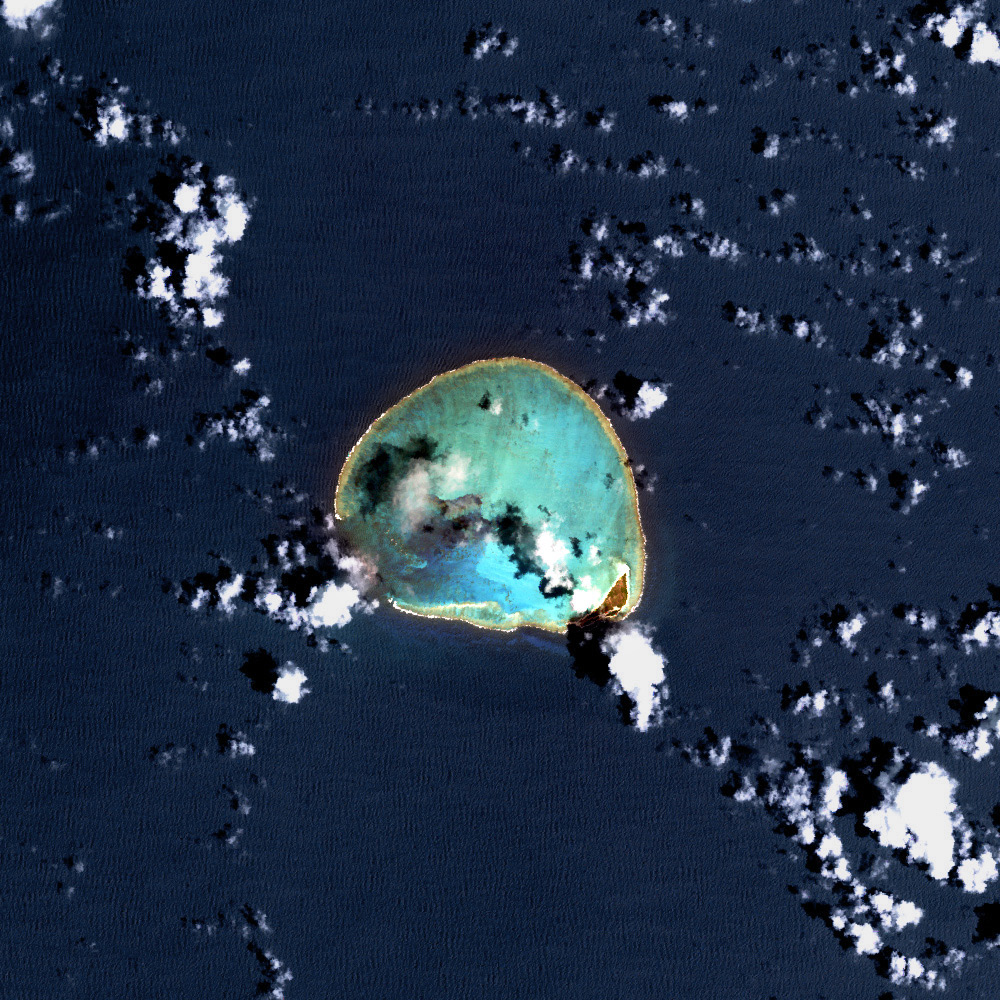
Satellite image of Kure Atoll

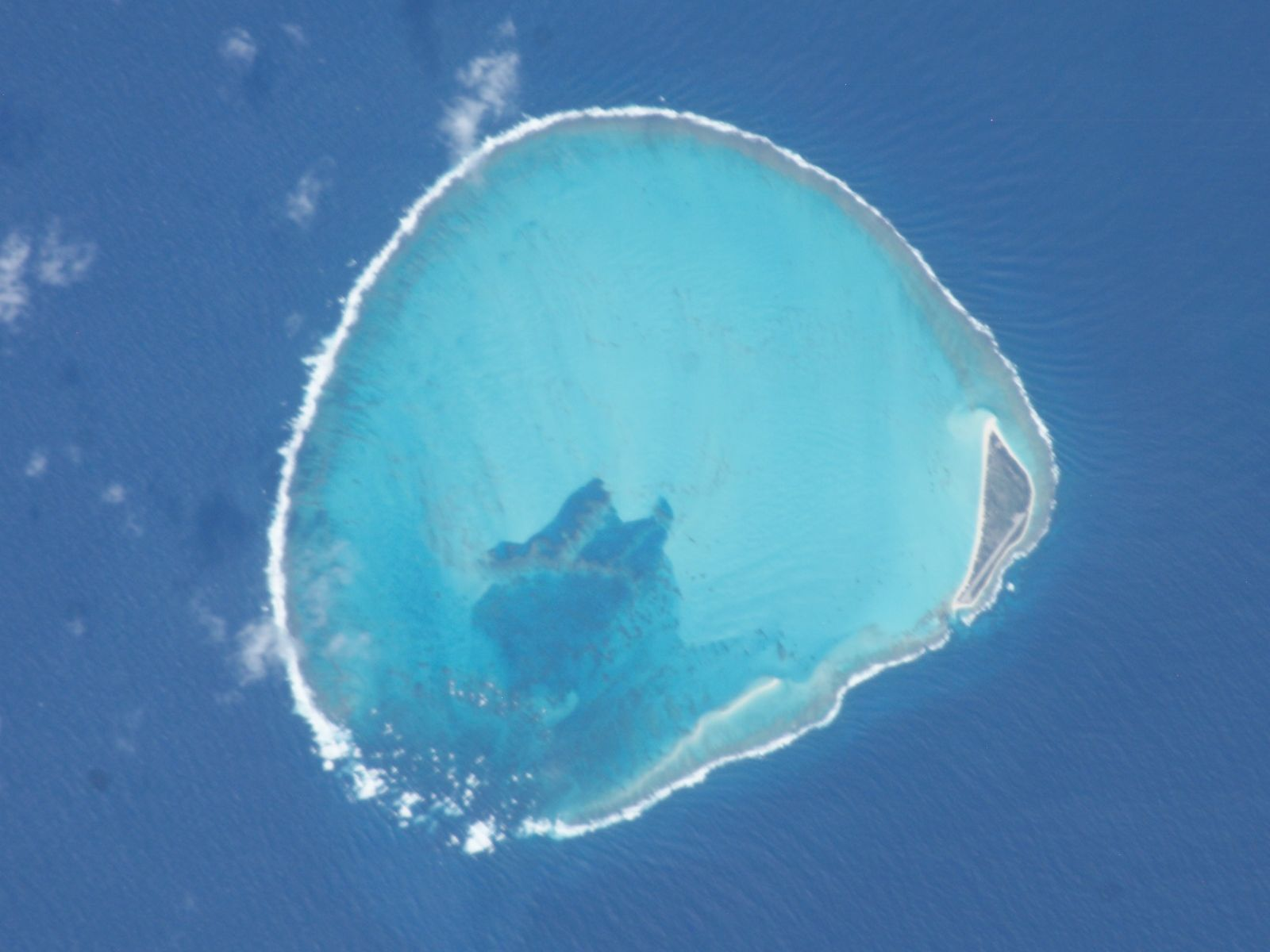
NASA astronaut image of Kure Atoll (February 22, 2004)

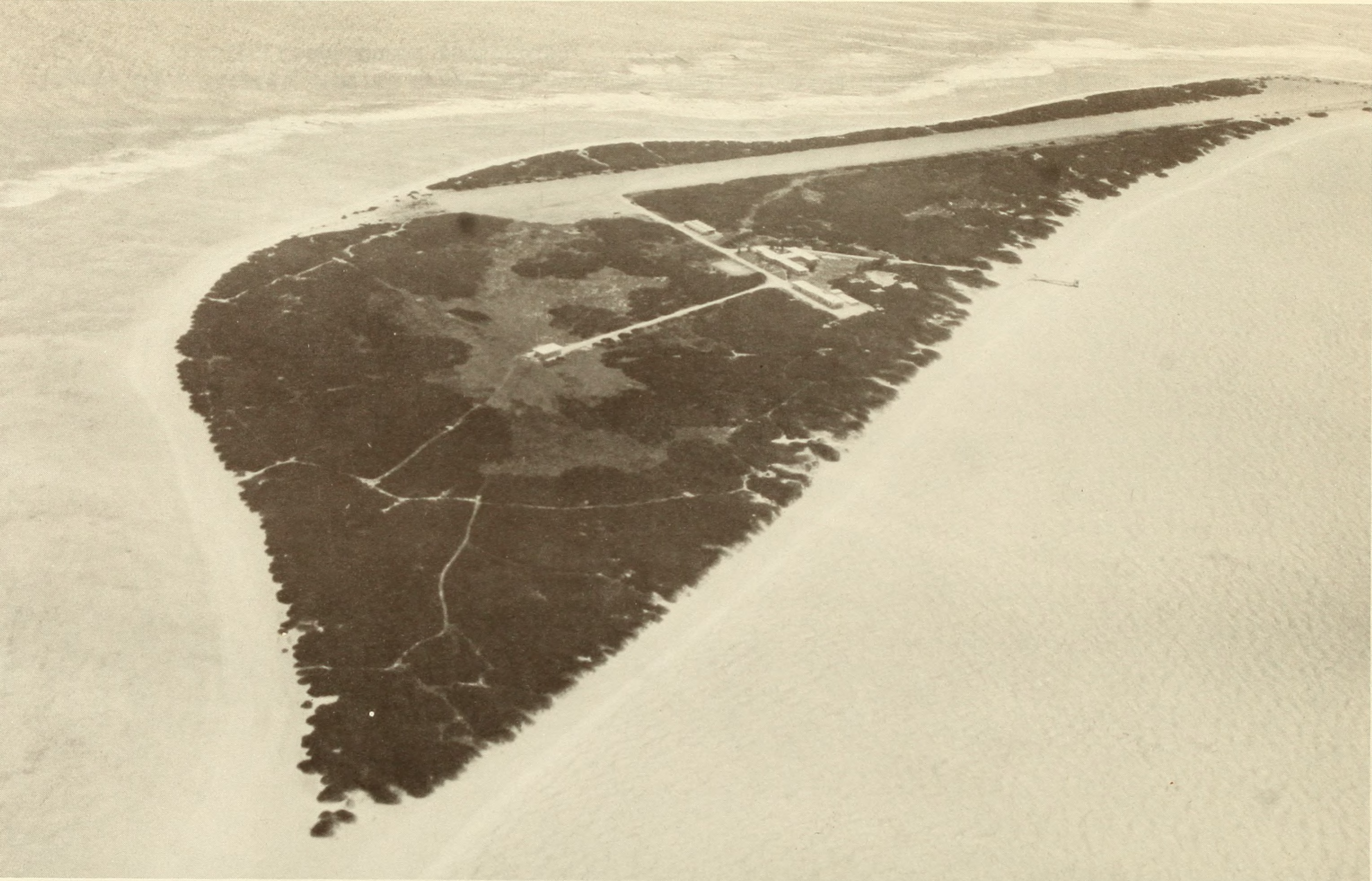
Photo of Green Island shot from the air (February 27, 1968)

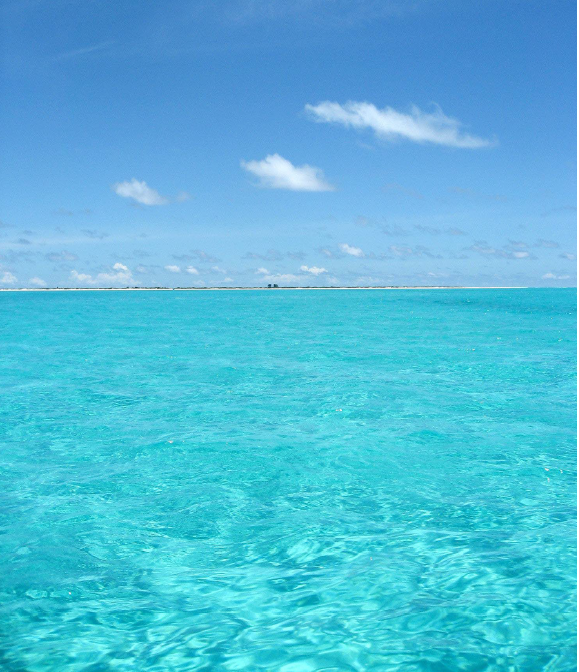
Kure Atoll on the horizon

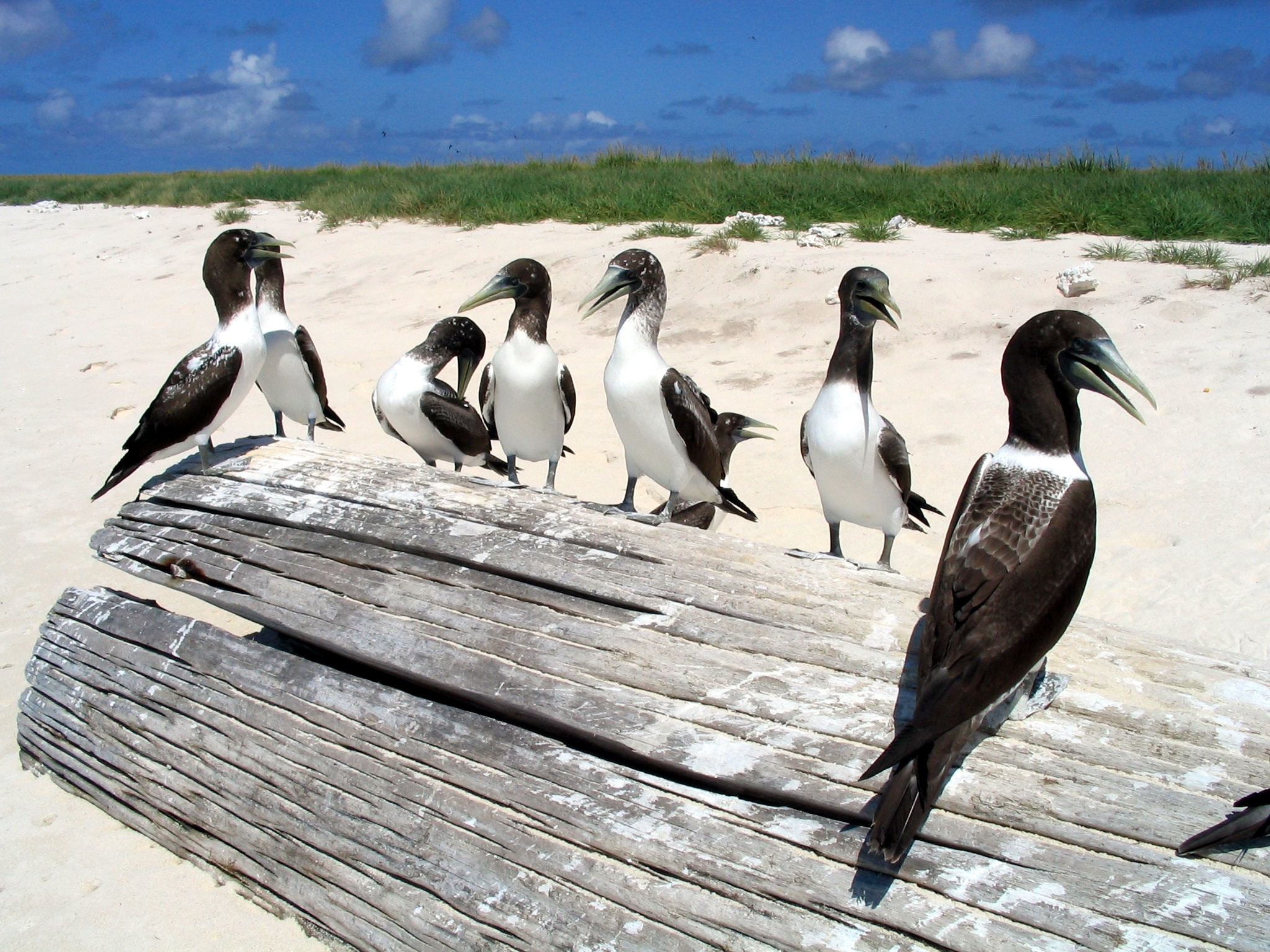
Young masked boobies (Sula dactylatra) on Green Island, Kure Atoll

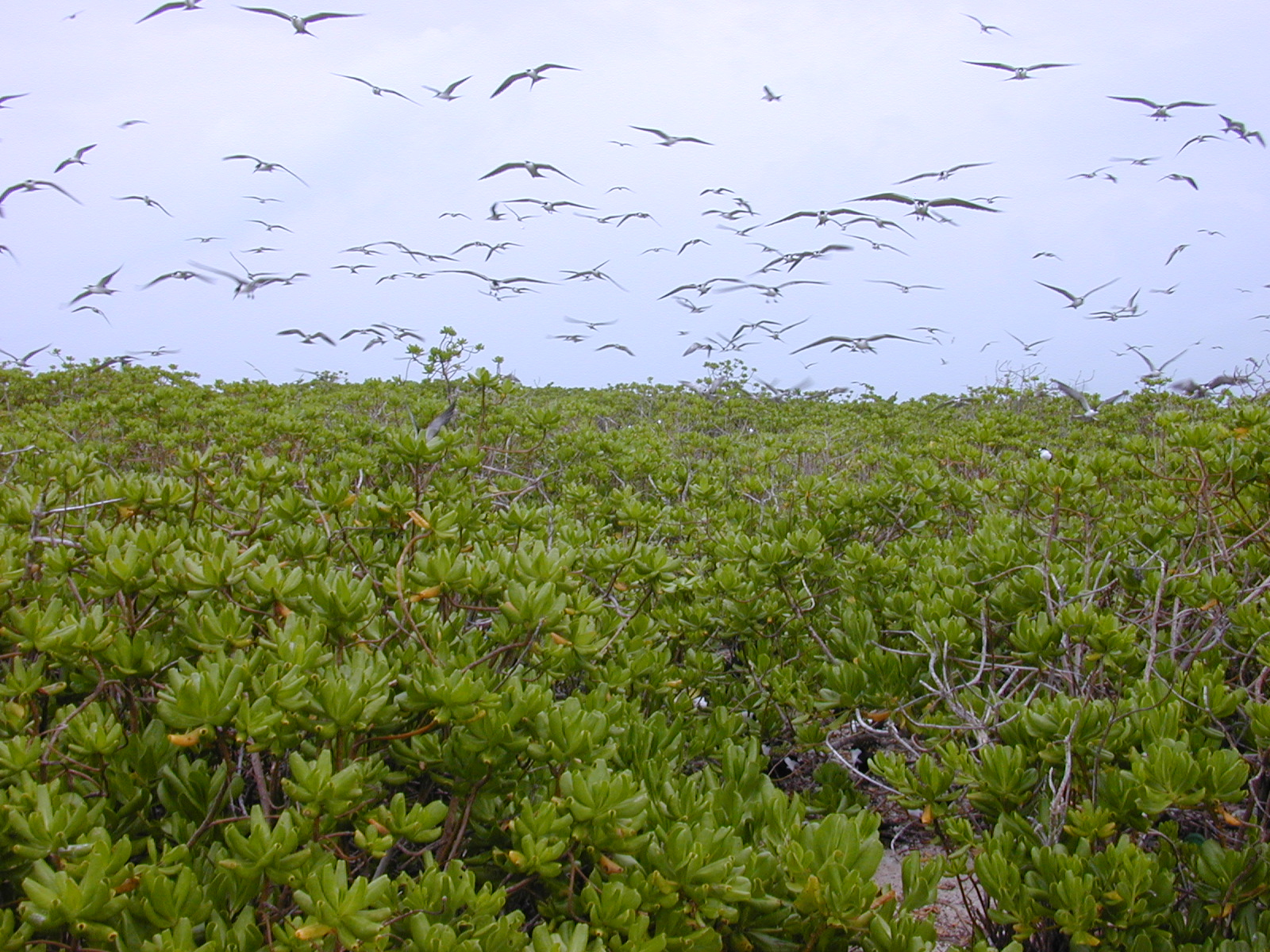
Scaevola taccada (habit with sooty terns). Location: Kure Atoll, inland

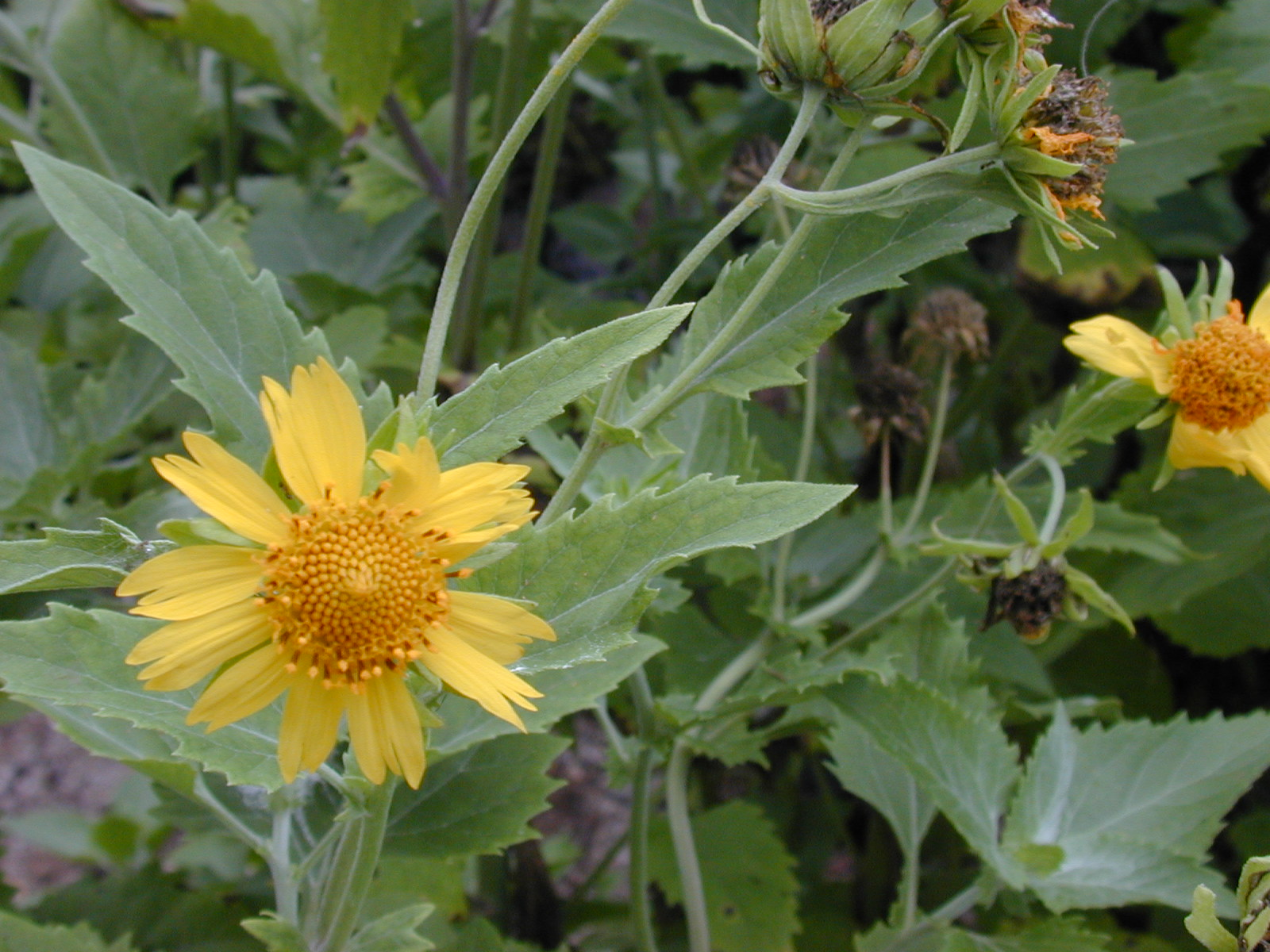
The flower of Verbesina encelioides at near camp of Kure Atoll

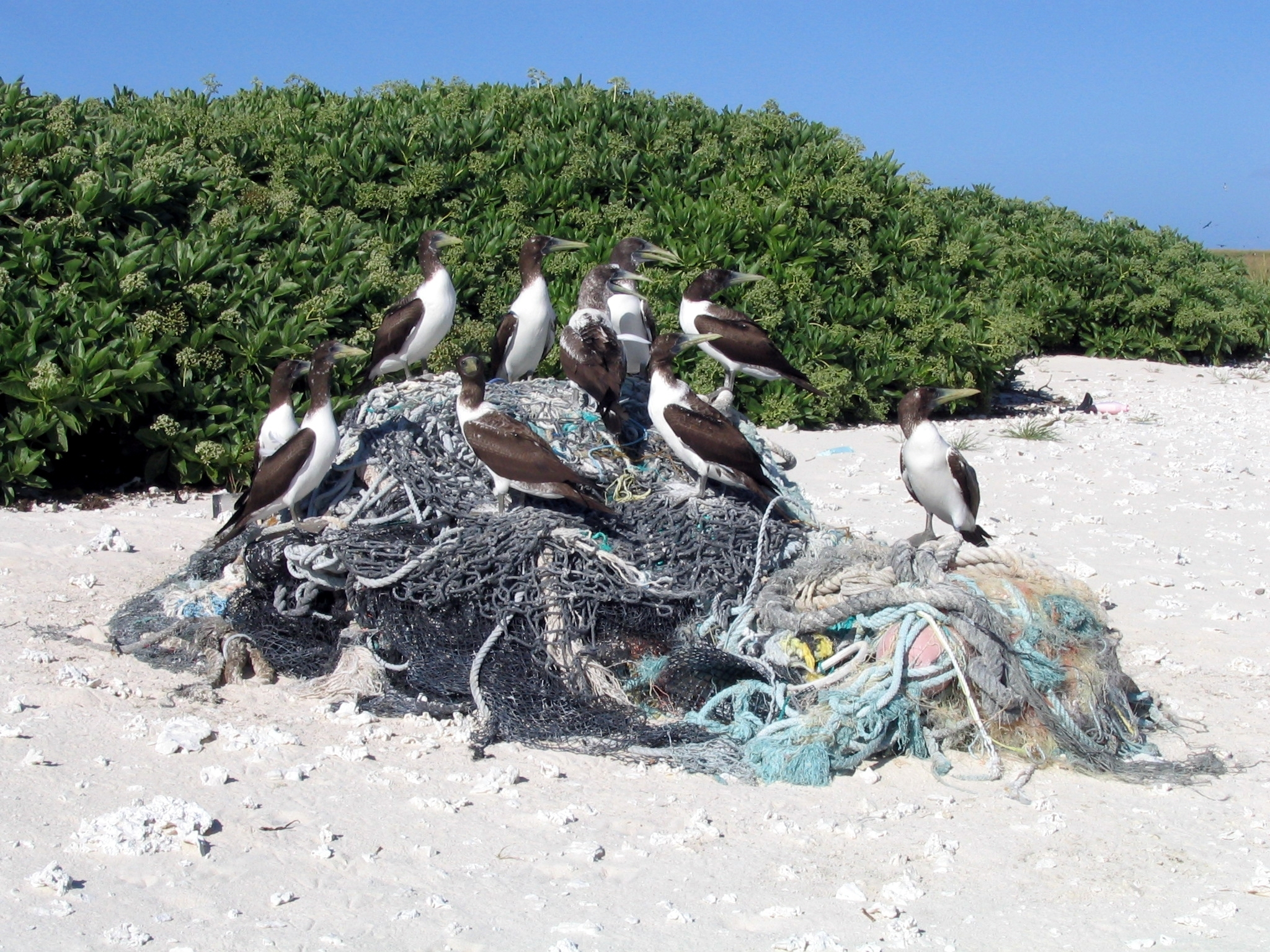
Young masked boobies (Sula dactylatra) sitting on marine debris on Green Island.

== See also ==
- Desert island
