= 1st meridian west =

Line of longitude

1st meridian west

The meridian 1° west of Greenwich is a line of longitude that extends from the North Pole across the Arctic Ocean, the Atlantic Ocean, Europe, Africa, the Southern Ocean, and Antarctica to the South Pole.

The 1st meridian west forms a great ellipse with the 179th meridian east.

It is the most populous meridian west of Greenwich, being home to between 41.2 million and 44.9 million people as of 2019.

== From pole to pole ==
Starting at the North Pole and heading south to the South Pole, the 1st meridian west passes through:

Co-ordinates	Country, territory or sea	Notes
90°0′N 1°0′W	Arctic Ocean	
81°42′N 1°0′W	Atlantic Ocean	
60°42′N 1°0′W	United Kingdom	Scotland — islands of Yell and Hascosay, Shetland
60°36′N 1°0′W	North Sea	
60°22′N 1°0′W	United Kingdom	Scotland — island of Whalsay, Shetland
60°20′N 1°0′W	North Sea	Passing just east of the Isle of Noss, Scotland, United Kingdom (at 60°8′N 1°1′W)
54°36′N 1°0′W	United Kingdom	England — making landfall just west of Saltburn-by-the-Sea, North Yorkshire
50°47′N 1°0′W	English Channel	Passing just east of the Isle of Wight, England, United Kingdom (at 50°41′N 1°4′W)
49°24′N 1°0′W	France	
42°59′N 1°0′W	Spain	Passing just west of Cartagena, Murcia at 37°36′N 0°59′W
37°35′N 1°0′W	Mediterranean Sea	
35°41′N 1°0′W	Algeria	
32°32′N 1°0′W	Morocco	For about 1 km at the easternmost part of the country
32°31′N 1°0′W	Algeria	
22°33′N 1°0′W	Mali	
14°51′N 1°0′W	Burkina Faso	
10°59′N 1°0′W	Ghana	
5°12′N 1°0′W	Atlantic Ocean	
60°0′S 1°0′W	Southern Ocean	
68°52′S 1°0′W	Antarctica	Queen Maud Land — claimed by Norway

Next westward: 2nd meridian west	1st meridian west forms a great circle with 179th meridian east	Next eastward: Prime meridian

== See also ==
- Prime meridian
- 2nd meridian west
