= 178th meridian west =

Line of longitude

178th meridian west

The meridian 178° west of Greenwich is a line of longitude that extends from the North Pole across the Arctic Ocean, Asia, the Pacific Ocean, the Southern Ocean, and Antarctica to the South Pole.

The 178th meridian west forms a great ellipse with the 2nd meridian east.

== From Pole to Pole ==
Starting at the North Pole and heading south to the South Pole, the 178th meridian west passes through:

Co-ordinates	Country, territory or sea	Notes
90°0′N 178°0′W	Arctic Ocean	
71°27′N 178°0′W	Russia	Chukotka Autonomous Okrug — Wrangel Island
71°1′N 178°0′W	Chukchi Sea	
68°26′N 178°0′W	Russia	Chukotka Autonomous Okrug
65°26′N 178°0′W	Bering Sea	
51°55′N 178°0′W	United States	Alaska — Tanaga Island
51°38′N 178°0′W	Pacific Ocean	Passing just east of Kure Atoll, Hawaii, United States (at 28°23′N 178°18′W); Passing just east of Futuna Island, Wallis and Futuna (at 14°19′S 178°3′W)
14°20′S 178°0′W	Wallis and Futuna	Alofi Island
14°21′S 178°0′W	Pacific Ocean	Passing just east of Vatoa Island, Fiji (at 19°49′S 178°13′W); Passing just west of Raoul Island, New Zealand (at 29°15′S 177°58′W)
60°0′S 178°0′W	Southern Ocean	
78°24′S 178°0′W	Antarctica	Ross Dependency, claimed by New Zealand

== See also ==
- 177th meridian west
- 179th meridian west
