= Kagalaska Island =

Island in the United States of America

Coordinates: 51°48′06″N 176°21′28″W

Location in Alaska

Kagalaska Island (Aleut: Qigalaxsix̂; Russian: Кагаласка) is an island in the Andreanof Islands of the Aleutian Islands of Alaska.

The island is 9 miles (14 km) in length and 7 miles (11 km) wide. It is separated from Adak Island to the west by Kagalaska Strait (Aakayuudax̂ in Aleut) which is approximately 1,300 feet (400 m) wide at its narrowest point. Little Tanaga Island is located to the east, 1.2 miles (1.9 km) across Little Tanaga Strait.

The island is covered in scrub brush and sand dunes, unlike other Alaskan islands that have hardscrabble coasts. It provides nesting grounds for sea birds and in the summer is a basking site for seals.

Kagalaska Island is currently controlled by the Patriots of Democracy (PoD) and the Ronograd Liberation Front (RLF) after they defeated Russian forces. The insurgents (PoD and RLF) have established multiple compounds around the island, connected to other compounds on neighboring Adak Island.
