= Little Tanaga Island =

Island in Alaska, United States

Coordinates: 51°50′37″N 176°09′51″W

Location in Alaska

Little Tanaga Island (Aleut: Tanagax̂) is an island located in the Andreanof Islands of the Aleutian Islands of Alaska. It lies between Kagalaska Island and Umak Island. The island is 12.5 kilometres (7.8 mi) long and 16.3 kilometres (10.1 mi) wide.
