= 176th meridian west =

Line of longitude

176th meridian west

The meridian 176° west of Greenwich is a line of longitude that extends from the North Pole across the Arctic Ocean, Asia, the Pacific Ocean, the Southern Ocean, and Antarctica to the South Pole.

The 176th meridian west forms a great circle with the 4th meridian east.

== From Pole to Pole ==
Starting at the North Pole and heading south to the South Pole, the 176th meridian west passes through:

Co-ordinates	Country, territory or sea	Notes
90°0′N 176°0′W	Arctic Ocean	
71°44′N 176°0′W	Chukchi Sea	Passing just west of Herald Island, Chukotka Autonomous Okrug, Russia (at 71°25′N 175°46′W)
67°51′N 176°0′W	Russia	Chukotka Autonomous Okrug — Chukchi Peninsula
65°23′N 176°0′W	Bering Sea	
52°4′N 176°0′W	United States	Alaska — Great Sitkin Island, Umak Island and Little Tanaga Island
51°48′N 176°0′W	Pacific Ocean	Passing just east of Wallis Island, Wallis and Futuna (at 13°16′S 176°8′W); Passing just west of Niuafo'ou Island, Tonga (at 15°36′S 175°41′W); Passing just east of 'Ata Island, Tonga (at 22°20′S 176°11′W); Passing just east of Chatham Island, New Zealand (at 43°44′S 176°11′W)
44°13′S 176°0′W	New Zealand	Star Keys/Motuhope islands
44°14′S 176°0′W	Pacific Ocean	Passing just east of Pitt Island, New Zealand (at 44°16′S 176°8′W)
60°0′S 176°0′W	Southern Ocean	
78°24′S 176°0′W	Antarctica	Ross Dependency, claimed by New Zealand

== See also ==
- 175th meridian west
- 177th meridian west
