= 177th meridian west =

Line of longitude

177th meridian west

The meridian 177° west of Greenwich is a line of longitude that extends from the North Pole across the Arctic Ocean, Asia, the Pacific Ocean, the Southern Ocean, and Antarctica to the South Pole.

The 177th meridian west forms a great circle with the 3rd meridian east.

== From Pole to Pole ==
Starting at the North Pole and heading south to the South Pole, the 177th meridian west passes through:

Co-ordinates	Country, territory or sea	Notes
90°0′N 177°0′W	Arctic Ocean	
71°42′N 177°0′W	Chukchi Sea	Passing just east of Wrangel Island, Chukotka Autonomous Okrug, Russia (at 71°13′N 177°27′W)
68°8′N 177°0′W	Russia	Chukotka Autonomous Okrug
65°36′N 177°0′W	Bering Sea	Passing just east of Kanaga Island, Alaska, United States (at 51°54′N 177°2′W); Passing just west of Adak Island, Alaska, United States (at 51°37′N 176°59′W)
51°40′N 177°0′W	Pacific Ocean	Passing just east of Midway Atoll, United States Minor Outlying Islands (at 28°12′N 177°19′W); Passing just west of Howland Island, United States Minor Outlying Islands (at 0°48′N 176°38′W); Passing just west of Chatham Island, New Zealand (at 43°49′S 176°54′W)
60°0′S 177°0′W	Southern Ocean	
78°25′S 177°0′W	Antarctica	Ross Dependency, claimed by New Zealand

== See also ==
- 176th meridian west
- 178th meridian west
