= USS Saginaw =

USS Saginaw may refer to the following ships of the United States Navy:

- USS Saginaw (1859), launched in 1859 as Toucey; commissioned in 1860 and wrecked in 1870; the gig that surviving sailors sailed to get help in is on display at the Saginaw History Museum in Saginaw, Michigan
- USS Saginaw (LST-1188), a tank landing ship commissioned in 1970 and decommissioned in 1994; sold to Australia
