= 3rd meridian east =

Line of longitude

3rd meridian east (interactive map)

The meridian 3° east of Greenwich is a line of longitude that extends from the North Pole across the Arctic Ocean, the Atlantic Ocean, Europe, Africa, the Southern Ocean, and Antarctica to the South Pole.

The 3rd meridian east forms a great circle with the 177th meridian west.

== From Pole to Pole ==
Starting at the North Pole and heading south to the South Pole, the 3rd meridian east passes through:

Co-ordinates	Country, territory or sea	Notes
90°0′N 3°0′E	Arctic Ocean	
81°29′N 3°0′E	Atlantic Ocean	
61°0′N 3°0′E	North Sea	
51°16′N 3°0′E	Belgium	
50°46′N 3°0′E	France	Passing just west of Lille (at 50°38′N 3°3′E) and through Narbonne (at 43°11′N 3°0′E)
42°29′N 3°0′E	Spain	
41°46′N 3°0′E	Mediterranean Sea	
39°55′N 3°0′E	Spain	Island of Mallorca
39°18′N 3°0′E	Mediterranean Sea	Passing just east of the island of Cabrera, Spain
36°49′N 3°0′E	Algeria	Passing just west of Algiers
19°56′N 3°0′E	Mali	
15°21′N 3°0′E	Niger	
12°16′N 3°0′E	Benin	
9°4′N 3°0′E	Nigeria	
6°24′N 3°0′E	Atlantic Ocean	Passing just west of Bouvet Island, Norway
60°0′S 3°0′E	Southern Ocean	
69°57′S 3°0′E	Antarctica	Queen Maud Land, claimed by Norway

Next westward: 2nd meridian east	3rd meridian east forms a great circle with 177th meridian west	Next eastward: 4th meridian east
