= 3rd meridian west =

Line of longitude

3rd meridian west

The meridian 3° west of Greenwich is a line of longitude that extends from the North Pole across the Arctic Ocean, the Atlantic Ocean, Europe, Africa, the Southern Ocean, and Antarctica to the South Pole.

The 3rd meridian west forms a great circle with the 177th meridian east.

== From Pole to Pole ==
Starting at the North Pole and heading south to the South Pole, the 3rd meridian west passes through:

Co-ordinates	Country, territory or sea	Notes
90°0′N 3°0′W	Arctic Ocean	
81°49′N 3°0′W	Atlantic Ocean	
59°20′N 3°0′W	United Kingdom	Scotland — island of Westray
59°16′N 3°0′W	Atlantic Ocean	Westray Firth
59°11′N 3°0′W	United Kingdom	Scotland — islands of Rousay and Wyre
59°7′N 3°0′W	North Sea	Wide Firth
59°11′N 3°0′W	United Kingdom	Scotland — island of Mainland (Orkney)
58°57′N 3°0′W	Scapa Flow	
58°49′N 3°0′W	United Kingdom	Scotland — island of South Ronaldsay
58°48′N 3°0′W	North Sea	
57°40′N 3°0′W	United Kingdom	Scotland — passing through Dundee (at 56°28′N 3°0′W)
56°12′N 3°0′W	Firth of Forth	
55°57′N 3°0′W	United Kingdom	Scotland — passing just east of Edinburgh (at 55°57′N 3°10′W); England — from 55°3′N 3°0′W
54°9′N 3°0′W	Irish Sea	Morecambe Bay
53°56′N 3°0′W	United Kingdom	England — passing just west of Liverpool (at 53°24′N 3°0′W) Wales — from 53°14′N 3°0′W England — from 52°57′N 3°0′W Wales — from 52°44′N 3°0′W England — from 52°43′N 3°0′W Wales — from 52°21′N 3°0′W England — from 52°19′N 3°0′W Wales — from 52°16′N 3°0′W England — from 52°15′N 3°0′W Wales — from 51°55′N 3°0′W
51°32′N 3°0′W	Bristol Channel	
51°20′N 3°0′W	United Kingdom	England
50°42′N 3°0′W	English Channel	
48°46′N 3°0′W	France	
47°34′N 3°0′W	Atlantic Ocean	Bay of Biscay — passing just east of Belle Île, France (at 47°18′N 3°3′W)
43°23′N 3°0′W	Spain	Passing just west of Bilbao (at 43°15′N 2°56′W)
36°45′N 3°0′W	Mediterranean Sea	Alboran Sea — passing just east of Isla de Alborán, Spain (at 35°57′N 3°2′W)
35°25′N 3°0′W	Morocco	Passing just west of the exclave of Melilla, Spain (at 35°18′N 2°58′W)
31°45′N 3°0′W	Algeria	
23°51′N 3°0′W	Mali	Passing through Timbuktu (at 16°46′N 3°0′W)
13°40′N 3°0′W	Burkina Faso	
9°43′N 3°0′W	Ivory Coast	
7°10′N 3°0′W	Ghana	
5°42′N 3°0′W	Ivory Coast	
5°6′N 3°0′W	Ghana	
5°4′N 3°0′W	Atlantic Ocean	
60°0′S 3°0′W	Southern Ocean	
70°18′S 3°0′W	Antarctica	Queen Maud Land — claimed by Norway

== See also ==
- 2nd meridian west
- 4th meridian west
