= 177th meridian east =

Line of longitude

177th meridian east (interactive map)

The meridian 177° east of Greenwich is a line of longitude that extends from the North Pole across the Arctic Ocean, Asia, the Pacific Ocean, New Zealand, the Southern Ocean, and Antarctica to the South Pole.

The 177th meridian east forms a great circle with the 3rd meridian west.

== From Pole to Pole ==
Starting at the North Pole and heading south to the South Pole, the 177th meridian east passes through:

Co-ordinates	Country, territory or sea	Notes
90°0′N 177°0′E	Arctic Ocean	
72°15′N 177°0′E	East Siberian Sea	
69°37′N 177°0′E	Russia	Chukotka Autonomous Okrug
62°31′N 177°0′E	Bering Sea	Passing just west of Kiska Island, Alaska, United States (at 51°53′N 177°12′E)
52°0′N 177°0′E	Pacific Ocean	Passing just east of Arorae atoll, Kiribati (at 2°40′S 176°51′E); Passing just west of Nui atoll, Tuvalu (at 7°13′S 177°8′E); Passing just west of the island of Rotuma, Fiji (at 12°30′S 177°1′E); Passing just east of the island of Viwa, Fiji (at 17°9′S 176°55′E); Passing just west of the island of Waya, Fiji (at 17°16′S 177°6′E); Passing just west of the Mamanuca Islands, Fiji (at 17°35′S 177°4′E); Passing just west of Whakaari/White Island, New Zealand (at 37°31′S 177°9′E)
37°56′S 177°0′E	New Zealand	North Island — passing through the town of Whakatane (at 37°58′S 177°0′E)
39°17′S 177°0′E	Pacific Ocean	Hawke Bay
39°38′S 177°0′E	New Zealand	North Island
39°47′S 177°0′E	Pacific Ocean	
60°0′S 177°0′E	Southern Ocean	
77°50′S 177°0′E	Antarctica	Ross Dependency — claimed by New Zealand

== See also ==
- 176th meridian east
- 178th meridian east
