= 179th meridian east =

Line of longitude

179th meridian east

The meridian 179° east of Greenwich is a line of longitude that extends from the North Pole across the Arctic Ocean, Asia, the Pacific Ocean, the Southern Ocean, and Antarctica to the South Pole.

The 179th meridian east forms a great circle with the 1st meridian west.

== From Pole to Pole ==
Starting at the North Pole and heading south to the South Pole, the 179th meridian east passes through:

Co-ordinates	Country, territory or sea	Notes
90°0′N 179°0′E	Arctic Ocean	
71°15′N 179°0′E	Russia	Chukotka Autonomous Okrug — Wrangel Island
70°50′N 179°0′E	Chukchi Sea	
69°20′N 179°0′E	Russia	Chukotka Autonomous Okrug
64°42′N 179°0′E	Bering Sea	Gulf of Anadyr
63°19′N 179°0′E	Russia	Chukotka Autonomous Okrug
62°20′N 179°0′E	Bering Sea	
51°34′N 179°0′E	United States	Alaska — island of Amchitka
51°30′N 179°0′E	Pacific Ocean	Passing just east of the island of Vaitupu, Tuvalu (at 7°29′S 178°42′E); Passing just west of Funafuti atoll, Tuvalu (at 8°31′S 179°2′E)
16°28′S 179°0′E	Fiji	Island of Vanua Levu
16°55′S 179°0′E	Koro Sea	Passing just east of the island of Makogai, Fiji (at 17°26′S 178°59′E)
17°36′S 179°0′E	Fiji	Wakaya Island
17°37′S 179°0′E	Pacific Ocean	Passing just west of the Bounty Islands, New Zealand (at 47°42′S 179°2′E); Passing just east of the Antipodes Islands, New Zealand (at 49°41′S 178°50′E)
60°0′S 179°0′E	Southern Ocean	
78°14′S 179°0′E	Antarctica	Ross Dependency — claimed by New Zealand

== See also ==
- 178th meridian east
- 180th meridian
