= 178th meridian east =

Line of longitude

178th meridian east

The meridian 178° east of Greenwich is a line of longitude that extends from the North Pole across the Arctic Ocean, Asia, the Pacific Ocean, New Zealand, the Southern Ocean, and Antarctica to the South Pole.

The 178th meridian east forms a great circle with the 2nd meridian west.

== From Pole to Pole ==
Starting at the North Pole and heading south to the South Pole, the 178th meridian east passes through:

Co-ordinates	Country, territory or sea	Notes
90°0′N 178°0′E	Arctic Ocean	
72°0′N 178°0′E	East Siberian Sea	
69°28′N 178°0′E	Russia	Chukotka Autonomous Okrug
64°41′N 178°0′E	Anadyrskiy Liman	
64°12′N 178°0′E	Russia	Chukotka Autonomous Okrug
62°32′N 178°0′E	Bering Sea	Passing just west of Segula Island, Alaska, United States (at 52°1′N 178°5′E)
51°55′N 178°0′E	Pacific Ocean	
17°24′S 178°0′E	Fiji	Island of Viti Levu
18°15′S 178°0′E	Pacific Ocean	
18°22′S 178°0′E	Fiji	Island of Yanutha
18°23′S 178°0′E	Pacific Ocean	
19°6′S 178°0′E	Fiji	Kadavu Island
19°9′S 178°0′E	Pacific Ocean	
37°32′S 178°0′E	New Zealand	North Island — passing through the city of Gisborne (at 38°39′S 178°0′E)
38°40′S 178°0′E	Pacific Ocean	
60°0′S 178°0′E	Southern Ocean	
78°4′S 178°0′E	Antarctica	Ross Dependency — claimed by New Zealand

== See also ==
- 177th meridian east
- 179th meridian east
