= Umak Island =

Island in Alaska, United States

Coordinates: 51°53′17″N 176°02′29″W

Location in Alaska

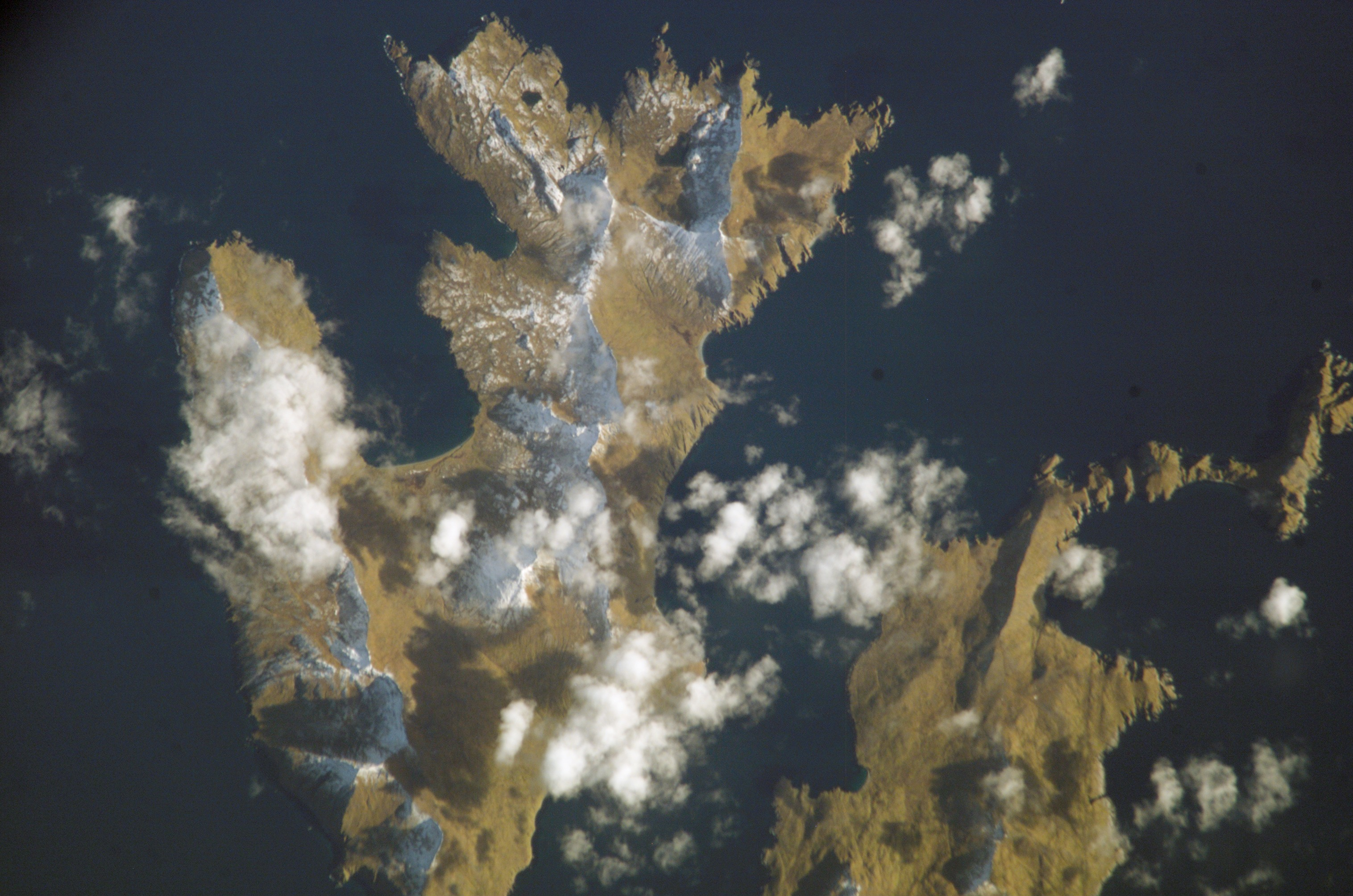
NASA photo of Umak Island.

Umak Island (Aleut: Uhmax̂) is an island lying in a group of small islands situated between Adak Island and Atka Island in the Andreanof Islands group of the Aleutian Islands of Alaska. It is 11.7 kilometres (7.3 miles) long and 7.8 kilometres (4.8 miles) wide.
