= National Register of Historic Places listings in Aleutians West Census Area, Alaska =

Location of the Aleutians West Census Area in Alaska

This is a list of the National Register of Historic Places listings in Aleutians West Census Area, Alaska.

This is intended to be a complete list of the properties and districts on the National Register of Historic Places in Aleutians West Census Area, Alaska, United States. The locations of National Register properties and districts for which the latitude and longitude coordinates are included below, may be seen in a Google map.

There are 15 properties and districts listed on the National Register in the census area, including 10 National Historic Landmarks.

This National Park Service list is complete through NPS recent listings posted October 16, 2026.

== Current listings ==
	Name on the Register	Image	Date listed	Location	City or town	Description
1	Adak Army Base and Adak Naval Operating Station	Adak Army Base and Adak Naval Operating Station	February 27, 1987 (#87000841)	Adak Island; 51°52′54″N 176°38′53″W	Adak	The historical 47,000 acres (19,000 ha) area covers the town of Adak and most of Adak Island north of it. It is roughly bounded by Cape Adagdak, Scabbard Bay, and Shagak Bay.
2	Anangula Archeological District	Anangula Archeological District	June 2, 1978 (#78000512)	Southern end of Anangula Island; 52°59′47″N 168°54′47″W	Nikolski	
3	Atka B-24D Liberator	Atka B-24D Liberator	July 26, 1979 (#79000407)	Address restricted	Atka	
4	Attu Battlefield and U.S. Army and Navy Airfields on Attu	Attu Battlefield and U.S. Army and Navy Airfields on Attu	February 4, 1985 (#85002729)	Attu Island; 52°53′26″N 173°04′29″E	Attu Island	The historical 7,000 acres (2,800 ha) area covers the whole eastern part of Attu Island, roughly Temnac Bay to Austin Cove.
5	Cape Field at Fort Glenn (Umnak Island)	Cape Field at Fort Glenn (Umnak Island)	May 28, 1987 (#87001301)	Umnak Island; 53°22′38″N 167°53′22″W	Fort Glenn	The historical 7,550 acres (3,060 ha) area covering the airfield and the naval base is roughly comprised between Otter Bight and Camp Bay.
6	Chaluka Site	Chaluka Site	October 15, 1966 (#66000155)	Address restricted	Nikolski	
7	Church of the Holy Ascension	Church of the Holy Ascension	April 15, 1970 (#70000112)	In Unalaska; 53°52′32″N 166°32′11″W	Unalaska	
8	Dutch Harbor Naval Operating Base and Fort Mears, U.S. Army	Dutch Harbor Naval Operating Base and Fort Mears, U.S. Army	February 4, 1985 (#85002733)	Amaknak Island; 53°53′17″N 166°32′31″W	Unalaska	The historical 1,000 acres (400 ha) area roughly covers the central part of Amaknak Island.
9	Japanese Occupation Site, Kiska Island	Japanese Occupation Site, Kiska Island	February 4, 1985 (#85002732)	Kiska Island; 51°59′05″N 177°31′46″E	Kiska Island	The historical 48,900 acres (19,800 ha) area covers almost the whole Kiska Island, with the exception of Kiska Volcano and the area south of Lief Cove and Vega Bay.
10	S.S. NORTHWESTERN Shipwreck Site	S.S. NORTHWESTERN Shipwreck Site	September 12, 1994 (#94001065)	Captains Bay; 53°49′50″N 166°36′37″W	Unalaska	Bombed by the Japanese during the World War II Battle of Dutch Harbor, the ship's remnant hulk sank at Port Levashef, at the head of Captains Bay in 1945.
11	St. George the Great Martyr Orthodox Church	St. George the Great Martyr Orthodox Church	June 6, 1980 (#80000743)	In St. George; 56°36′07″N 169°32′52″W	St. George Island	
12	St. Nicholas Church	St. Nicholas Church	June 6, 1980 (#80000740)	In Nikolski; 52°56′18″N 168°51′42″W	Nikolski	
13	Sts. Peter and Paul Church	Sts. Peter and Paul Church	June 6, 1980 (#80000744)	In St. Paul; 57°07′15″N 170°16′51″W	St. Paul Island	
14	Seal Island Historic District	Seal Island Historic District	October 15, 1966 (#66000156)	St. Paul and St. George Islands; 56°54′28″N 170°02′26″W	Pribilof Islands	The historical 6,970 acres (2,820 ha) district covers 106 buildings, 2 structures, 12 historic sites and 2 archeological sites distributed in St. Paul village, St. George village, and in the area of Northeast Point on St. Paul Island.
15	Sitka Spruce Plantation	Sitka Spruce Plantation	February 14, 1978 (#78000513)	Along Biorka Drive, on Amaknak Island; 53°53′17″N 166°32′40″W	Unalaska	

== See also ==
- List of National Historic Landmarks in Alaska
- National Register of Historic Places listings in Alaska
