= Chaluka Site =

Archaeological site in Alaska, United States

- U.S. National Register of Historic Places
- U.S. National Historic Landmark
- Alaska Heritage Resources Survey
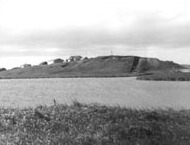
- Seaside view of the site

- Location within Alaska
- Location: Address restricted, Umnak Island, Aleutian Islands, Alaska, United States
- Nearest city: Nikolski, Alaska
- NRHP reference No.: 66000155
- AHRS No.: SAM-001

Significant dates
- Added to NRHP: October 15, 1966
- Designated NHL: December 29, 1962

The Chaluka Site is a prehistoric archaeological site and National Historic Landmark in Nikolski, Alaska, on Umnak Island in the Aleutian Islands of southwestern Alaska. The site documents more than 4,000 years of more-or-less continuous occupation of the area now occupied by the modern village of Nikolski. The site includes a large midden, yielding much information about the origins of the Aleut people.

== Description ==
The major feature of the site is its large midden, a mound about 700 feet (210 m) long, 200 feet (61 m) wide, and 21 feet (6.4 m) deep. Excavations at the site have yielded more than 4,000 artifacts, including a wide variety of projectile points, made from ivory, bone, and stone. The site has also yielded one of the oldest radiocarbon dates in the Aleutian Islands, documenting human activity there as early as 1,800 BCE. Human remains identified as Paleo-Aleut in age have been recovered from the site, as have stone lamps, stone knives of a type similar to those found at Dorset culture sites, and carved ivory deity images.

The site was first identified as of archaeological interest in 1909, and its first major excavation took place in 1938 under the auspices of the Smithsonian Institution's Aleš Hrdlička. It has since been a regular subject of study. One of the most important excavations took place in 1962 under the leadership of William S. Laughlin, in which two wide trenches were dug, and the stratigraphy of the midden carefully documented.

The Chaluka site is unique because it supported a continuous population for nearly 3.500 years and reveals a very precise food sourcing system that sustains the fostering of faunal life. Mathematical figures were used to manage natural stocks.

The site was declared a National Historic Landmark in 1962, and listed on the National Register of Historic Places in 1966.

== See also ==
- National Register of Historic Places listings in Aleutians West Census Area, Alaska
- List of National Historic Landmarks in Alaska
