= St. Nicholas Church (Nikolski, Alaska) =

Historic church in Alaska, United States

- U.S. National Register of Historic Places
- Alaska Heritage Resources Survey
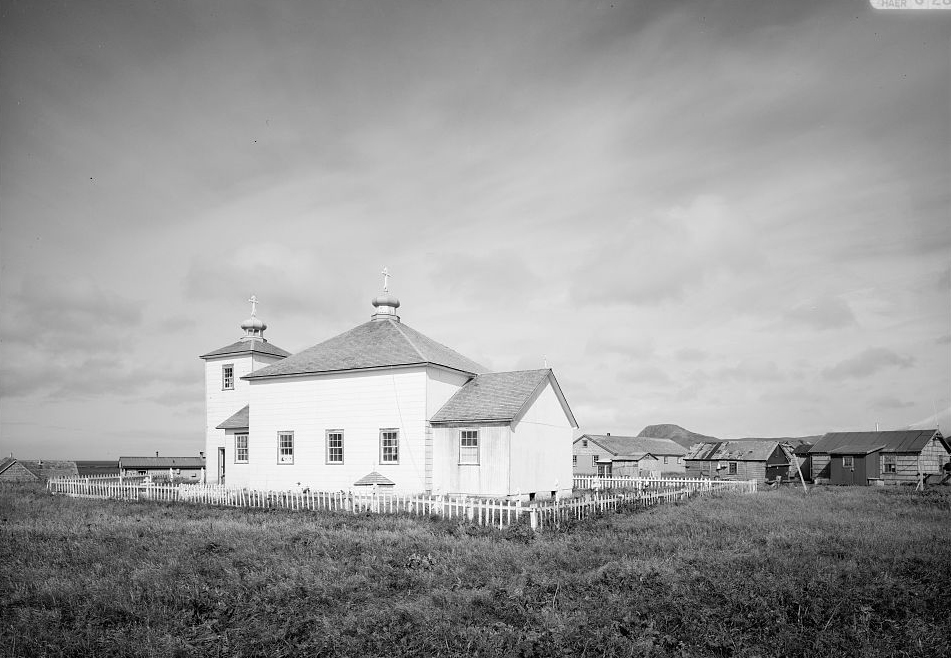
- 1990 HABS photo

- Location within Alaska
- Location: In Nikolski, Nikolski, Alaska
- Coordinates: 52°56′18″N 168°51′42″W
- Area: less than one acre
- Built: 1930
- MPS: Russian Orthodox Church Buildings and Sites TR
- NRHP reference No.: 80000740
- AHRS No.: SAM-022

Significant dates
- Added to NRHP: 6 June 1980
- Designated AHRS: 18 May 1973

St. Nicholas Church is a historic Russian Orthodox church in Nikolski, Alaska, which is located at the southern end of Umnak Island. It is now under the Diocese of Alaska, in the Parish of the Aleutian Deanery, of the Orthodox Church in America.

== History ==
The current church was built in 1930, and is believed to be the fourth church on the island. The first church was built in 1806 by John Kriukov, and was burned down during the 1800s. The second was constructed by Father John Veniaminov, later known as Brother Innocent, consecrated in 1828, and burned in 1898. The third was built in 1898–1900 a few miles away then moved to the current church location in about 1918, and was replaced in 1930. It is not known who built this church; however, it is known for its decorative carving, completed by Sergei Sovoroff and Joseph Krukoff.

The church was added to the National Register of Historic Places in 1980.

In 2021 a new fence was erected around the church cemetery, to prevent further damage from grazing animals.

== Design ==
The church has a customary three-element design (altar section, nave, and vestibule section), with addition of a nearly independent bell tower. Its nave is larger and taller than usual among the Russian Orthodox churches of Alaska, and it has "simple detailing [which] coupled with small, economically severe, windows, suggests an almost Shaker design influence," according to a 1979 evaluation.

== See also ==
- National Register of Historic Places listings in Aleutians West Census Area, Alaska
