= USCGC Clover =

Cactus Class buoy tender

History

United States
- Name: Clover
- Namesake: Clover
- Operator: United States Coast Guard
- Cost: $907,240.00 USD
- Laid down: 3 December 1941
- Launched: 25 April 1942
- Completed: 1942
- Commissioned: 8 November 1942
- Decommissioned: 1 June 1990
- Identification: Callsign: NRPK; Hull number: WLB-292
- Nickname(s): Sea Lover
- Fate: Sunk as target, 26 June 1990
- Notes: Bell at Humboldt Bay Maritime Museum

General characteristics
- Class & type: Cactus, A class
- Type: WAGL (1941) WLB (1965) WMEC (1990)
- Displacement: 935 full (1945); 1,026 full (1966); 700 light (1966)
- Length: 180 feet oa
- Beam: 37 feet mb
- Draft: 12 feet maximum (1945). 14 feet, 7 inches (1966)
- Ice class: Notched forefoot, ice-belt at waterline, reinforced bow and stern
- Propulsion: 1 electric motor connected to 2 Westinghouse generators driven by 2 Cooper-Bessemer-type GND-8, 4-cycle diesels; single screw (1942)
- Speed: Top speed: 13.0 knots sustained (1945); 11.9 knots sustained (1966) Economic speed: 8.3 knots (1945); 8.5 knots (1966)
- Range: 8,000 miles at 13 knots. 17,000 miles at 8.3 knots
- Capacity: 30,000 gallons diesel
- Complement: 6 Officers, 74 men (1945); 4 officers, 2 warrant officers, 47 enlisted (1966)
- Sensors & processing systems: Electronics: Radar Bk (1943); SL-1 (1945) Sonar WEA-2 (1945). Changed to Raytheon AN/SPS-64 in 1979
- Armament: 1-3 in (76 mm)/50 (single), 4-20 mm Oerlikon/80 (single), 2 depth charge tracks, 2 Mousetraps, 4 Y-guns, M2 Browning machine guns, small arms (1945). M2 Browning machine guns, M60 machine guns, and small arms (1966)

USCGC Clover WAGL/WLB/WMEC-292, a Cactus (A) Class buoy tender was built by Marine Iron and Shipbuilding, Duluth, Minnesota. Her keel was laid 3 December 1941, and she was launched 25 April 1942. She was commissioned on 8 November 1942 in the United States Coast Guard as the United States Coast Guard Cutter Clover. She was built as a WAGL, redesignated a WLB in 1965, and again redesignated a WMEC in 1979.

== Ship's history ==
=== World War Two ===
During the months of January and February 1943 Clover was used to break ice at Cleveland Ledge, Massachusetts and the Hog Island Channel in the Chesapeake Bay. Then Clover was assigned to the 13th Coast Guard District, Seattle, Washington; and used for escort duty due to the shortage of ships of that type.

From April 1943 through September 1943 Clover was employed in the construction of the Bering Sea LORAN chain at St. Paul Island, Unimak Island, St. Matthew Island, and Cape Sarichef, Alaska. On 20 December 1943, the cutter towed the damaged U.S. Navy submarine chaser USS Maynard PC-780 to safety. In July 1945 Clover assisted the distressed U.S. Navy rescue tug USS ATR-(TP)-127. From 1944 to 1945 Clover was assigned to ALASKASEAFRON and performed general aids to navigation (ATON) duties.

On the evening of 19 May 1944 the Clover arrived off the entrance to Dry Bay, Alaska, about 9:30 in the evening and in an attempt to rescue two fishing vessels sent in a motor launch with seven men aboard. As the small open boat entered the bay it was engulfed by breakers and all seven men perished.

=== Postwar ===
From 22 August 1946 through 17 October 1948 Clover was stationed at Dutch Harbor, Alaska, and performed ATON duties. From 18 October 1948 through 30 January 1958 Clover was stationed at Kodiak, Alaska for ATON work. On 7 May 1950 the tender assisted FV Evolution in Warm Springs Bay, Alaska. On 14 August 1950 Clover helped a grounded barge in Hooper Bay, Alaska. On 12 January 1951 Clover assisted the grounded MV Lady Jape at Valdez Arm, Alaska. On 8 August 1951 the cutter towed a disabled aircraft to Nome, Alaska.

During 27 through 29 March 1952 Clover assisted the disabled MV Garland at 56d 24m N, 154d 40m W. On 5 August 1952 Clover assisted FV Alice I near Chugach Island, Alaska. Later, on 15 August 1952 she towed the disabled FV Renabel into Seward, Alaska. On 12 October 1953 the U.S. Navy barracks craft APL-55 ran aground and Clover helped her to get back underway.

On 23 May 1955 Clover assisted USC&GS Surveyor off Popof Island Alaska. On 21 January 1956 the cutter rescued three marooned survivors from Ananiuliak Island, Alaska. During 18 to 19 April 1956 Clover towed the disabled FV Shamrock to Yakutat, Alaska. From 3 to 15 February 1958 Clover participated in a joint exercise with the United States Navy.

From 1 July 1958 through 30 June 1964, Clover was stationed at Adak, Alaska and did ATON, law enforcement, search and rescue, and fisheries patrol. Clover also tended lightships and lighthouses.

From 23 to 25 December 1959 Clover aided and then escorted the disabled Japanese MV Hokyo Maru from Nazan Harbor at Atka Island in the Aleutians to Adak, Alaska. On 24 April 1960 she towed the disabled Canadian FV Norprince to Dutch Harbor, Unalaska, Alaska. During 28 through 30 April 1960 Clover discovered Japanese fishing vessels in U.S. territorial waters and escorted them to international waters.

From 1 July 1964 through 30 June 1965 Clover was stationed at Ketchikan, Alaska, and performed ATON duties. Then Clover was re-assigned to Sitka, Alaska and homeported there from 1 July 1965 through December 1969. As she had in previous assignments, her primary duty was the maintaining of aids to navigation (ATON).

In April 1966 Clover took over the tow the disabled FV Astronaut from the Soviet FV Churkin 200 miles northwest of Ketchikan, Alaska. On 27 November 1967 the crew performed a MEDEVAC of a crewman from the Japanese MV Kirishima Maru in Sitka Sound, Alaska. On 20 May 1968 the Clover escorted the distressed FV Freeland 300 miles south of Cordova, Alaska, to Cape St. James, Alaska. On 12 September 1968 Clover escorted the MV Marutomo Maru which had an injured seaman on board to Sitka, Alaska. Later that month, on 29 September 1968, Clover towed the disabled FV Miss Georgia from Salisbury Sound, Alaska to Sitka, Alaska. On 2 January 1969 Clover salvaged a Champion aircraft which had ditched at Rodman Bay, Baranof Island, Alaska.

On 6 January 1970 Clover went to the aid of the distressed FV Irene G off Sitka, Alaska. On 21 February 1970 she rescued five persons from the tugboat MV Intrepid 15 miles south of Ocean Cape, Alaska. On 5 May 1970 Clover escorted the distressed FV Oceanic to Ketchikan, Alaska. On 27 June 1970 she seized the FV Akebono Maru No. 11 for illegal fishing within the U.S. contiguous zone. On 10 September 1975 Clover captured the Taiwanese FV Tong Hong 3 west of Sitka, Alaska for fisheries violations. On 9 February 1977 the tender apprehended FV Fukuyoshi Maru 75 for violating U.S. territorial waters.

From December 1979 until her decommissioning in June 1990 the Clover was stationed at Eureka, California. Clover was reclassified as a USCG Medium Endurance Cutter (WMEC), her hull painted white and performed search and rescue (SAR) and law enforcement (LE) patrols.

During March and April 1983 she assisted in the attempted salvage of Blunts Reef Large Navigational Buoy offshore from Cape Mendocino Light Station, California. In August 1983 Clover conducted fisheries patrol off the Washington, Oregon, and California coasts. On 1 June 1990 Clover was decommissioned and salvaged and turned over to the U.S. Navy. In 1992 Clover was used for gunnery practice by the U.S. Navy, and sunk as an artificial reef for a fish habitat program.

Her bell is preserved inside the Humboldt Bay Maritime Museum, Eureka, California.
