= Anangula Island =

Small island in the Fox Islands group of southwestern Alaska

Coordinates: 53°00′02″N 168°54′40″W

Location in Alaska

Anangula Island (Russian: Анангула; also called Ananiuliak Island; occasionally referred to as Kurityien Anaiuliak, Anaiuliak, Anayulyakh or Anangouliak Russian: Ананиулиак) is a small island in the Fox Islands group of the Aleutian Islands of southwestern Alaska. The 1.4-mile (2.3 km)-long island is separated from Umnak Island by a channel about 0.93 miles (1.50 km) wide and consists of a mostly barren tundra landscape of volcanic ash.

== Ancient history ==
During the last Pleistocene ice age, Anangula and nearby Umnak Island formed the tip of a peninsula on the southern edge of the Bering land bridge and was covered by the Cordilleran Ice Sheet that dominated the northwestern portion of North America. This made the area unsuitable for both animal and human habitation until the ice sheet began to recede about 10-12,000 years bp. The first human settlement on Anangula (and the oldest known evidence of human activity in the Aleutians), a small village and core and blade site on the southeastern end of the island, was established about 8,400 years bp. Although estimates of how long the settlement was occupied range from under 100 years to more than 1,500 years, it is generally agreed that it was abandoned after a major eruption at the Okmok volcano 70 kilometers (43 mi) northeast on Umnak buried the area under nearly two meters of ash.

== Recent history ==
During the 1910s, Anangula was one of many Aleutian islands to be stocked with Arctic foxes by the United States government for trapping and fur trading purposes, in this case mostly by the Aleuts who lived in Nikolski, about 4.3 miles (6.9 km) to the south on Umnak Island. Later, during the 1930s, an additional population of rabbits was established on the island to serve as food for the foxes. In the late 1940s, the foxes were removed because of their detrimental effects on the native marine bird populations, though the rabbits remain to the present.

The island gained some prominence in the archaeological community with the discovery of the core and blade site by William S. Laughlin in 1938. Later expeditions by Laughlin during the 1950s and 1960s uncovered more artifacts and a series of four expeditions in 1970-1974 unearthed the village site.
