= Anangula Archeological District =

Archaeological site in Alaska, United States

- Anangula Site
- U.S. National Register of Historic Places
- U.S. National Historic Landmark District
- Alaska Heritage Resources Survey
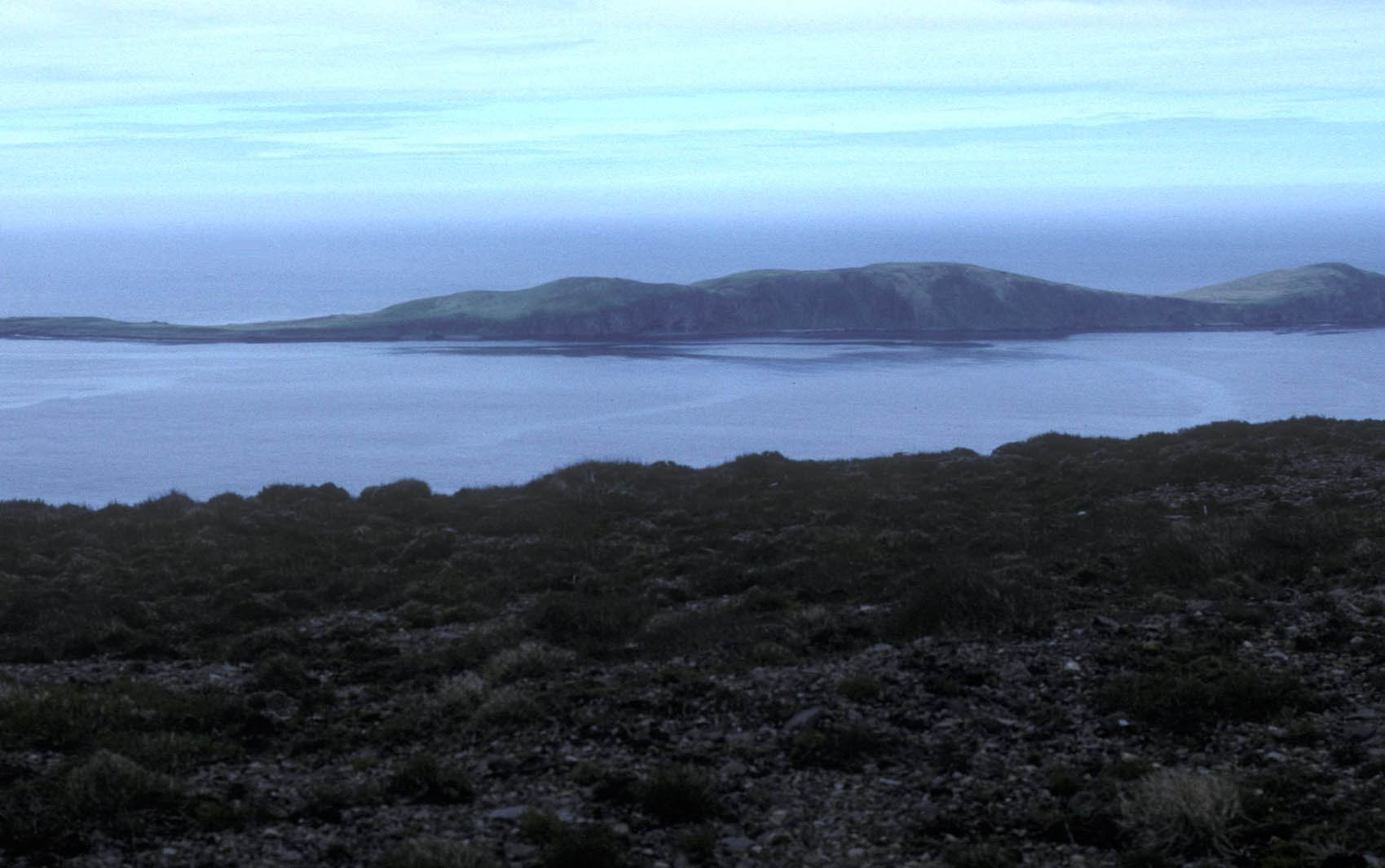

- Location within Alaska
- Location: near Umnak Island, Aleutian Islands, Alaska, United States
- Nearest city: Nikolski, Alaska
- Coordinates: 52°59′47″N 168°54′47″W
- Area: 47 acres (19 ha)
- NRHP reference No.: 78000512
- AHRS No.: SAM-012

Significant dates
- Added to NRHP: March 24, 1972
- Designated NHLD: June 2, 1978
- Designated AHRS: June 9, 1971

The Anangula Site (also Anangula Archeological District and Ananiuliak Island Archeological District) is an archaeological site in the Aleutian Islands of Alaska. Located on a 1.5 miles (2.4 km) long island off the western coast of Umnak Island, it lies 3.1 miles (5.0 km) north-northwest of Nikolski Bay. The site documents one of the earliest known human settlements in the Aleutian Islands, dating to c. 6400 BCE. It was in the 1970s believed to be a remnant of people thought to have migrated here across the land bridge from Asia.

The site is believed to have been along the southern fringe of the hypothesized Bering land bridge, by which (according to that theory) the Americas were first settled. At the time of its settlement, sea level was believed to be lower (by about 100 metres (330 ft)), and the area consisted of a strandflat surrounded by nutrient-rich waters and abundant wildlife. The immediate area of the settlement is also surrounded by evidence of volcanic ashfalls, which are theorized to contribute to the eventual abandonment of the site, leading to the settlement of other parts of Beringia.

The Anangula site was first discovered by William S. Laughlin in 1938, when surface surveys identified the area as of potential interest. In the 1950s additional research was done in the area, but its great age was not understood until its major features were found, buried beneath 2 metres (6.6 ft) of volcanic deposits. Excavations in the late 1960s uncovered all or part of eight house remains, and recovered more than 30,000 artifacts, some of which bore little resemblance to other North American finds at the time. These structures were partially subterranean, measuring about 3 metres (9.8 ft) by 5.5 metres (18 ft), and were apparently designed to house single families.

The site was first listed on the National Register of Historic Places as the Ananiuliak Island Archeological District in 1972, and was declared a National Historic Landmark District in 1978.

== Etymology ==
The island has historically been identified by a variety of spellings and pronunciations. Its Aleut name was reported by Capt. Lutke (1836, p. 299) as "Anangouliak" and by Father Veniaminov (1840, v. 1, p. 156) as "Ananulyak". This island was called 'O (strov) Anayulyakh " or "Anayulyakh Island" by Capt. Tebenkov (1852, map 25), IRN.

Other spellings include:

- Anangouliak Island
- Anangula
- Ananiuliak Island
- Ananulyak
- Anayulyakh Island
- Ostgraov Anayulyakh

== See also ==
- List of National Historic Landmarks in Alaska
- National Register of Historic Places listings in Aleutians West Census Area, Alaska
