= Cape Field at Fort Glenn =

- U.S. National Register of Historic Places
- U.S. National Historic Landmark District
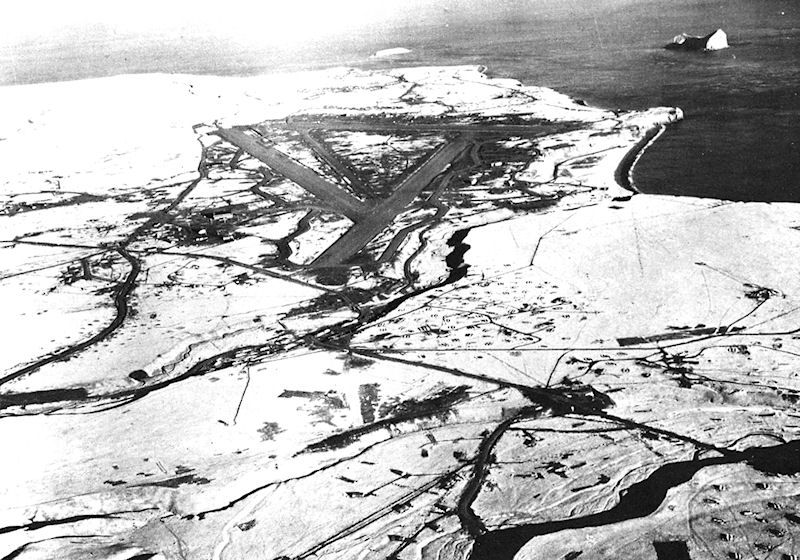
- Fort Glenn Airfield in 1942

- Location within Alaska
- Location: Umnak Island, Alaska
- Coordinates: 53°22′38″N 167°53′22″W
- Area: 7,550 acres (3,060 ha)
- Built: 1942
- Architect: U.S. Army
- NRHP reference No.: 87001301

Significant dates
- Added to NRHP: May 28, 1987
- Designated NHLD: May 28, 1987

Cape Field at Fort Glenn was a military site significant for its role in World War II. It consists of Fort Glenn, an airfield of the United States Army Air Corps later renamed Cape Air Force Base, and the adjacent Naval Air Facility Otter Point, both located on Umnak Island in the Aleutian Islands of southwestern Alaska. The site was listed on the National Register of Historic Places and declared a National Historic Landmark in 1987.

== History ==
=== Origins ===
Because of the perceived vulnerability of Alaska immediately following the Pearl Harbor Attack, additional Army Air Forces units were authorized by General Henry H. Arnold for Alaska and plans were made to send modern aircraft to the Territory to replace the obsolete aircraft assigned. However the Alaskan Air Force had few airfields to accommodate the additional aircraft and units being assigned.

Along with new airfields on the mainland and Southwest Alaska, new air bases were planned for the air defense of the Aleutians to Dutch Harbor. Construction of the new bases on Umnak and Cold Bay began in January 1942 in secret, with construction reportedly disguised as a cannery. The first United States Army engineers landed at what would become Fort Glenn Army Air Base on 17 January and construction began by the end of the month. A Naval airfield, Otter Point Naval Air Facility was adjacent to the Army Airbase. The 807th Engineering Battalion (Aviation) was brought in from Yukat to perform the construction along with a detachment of the Navy Seabee 8th Construction Battalion.

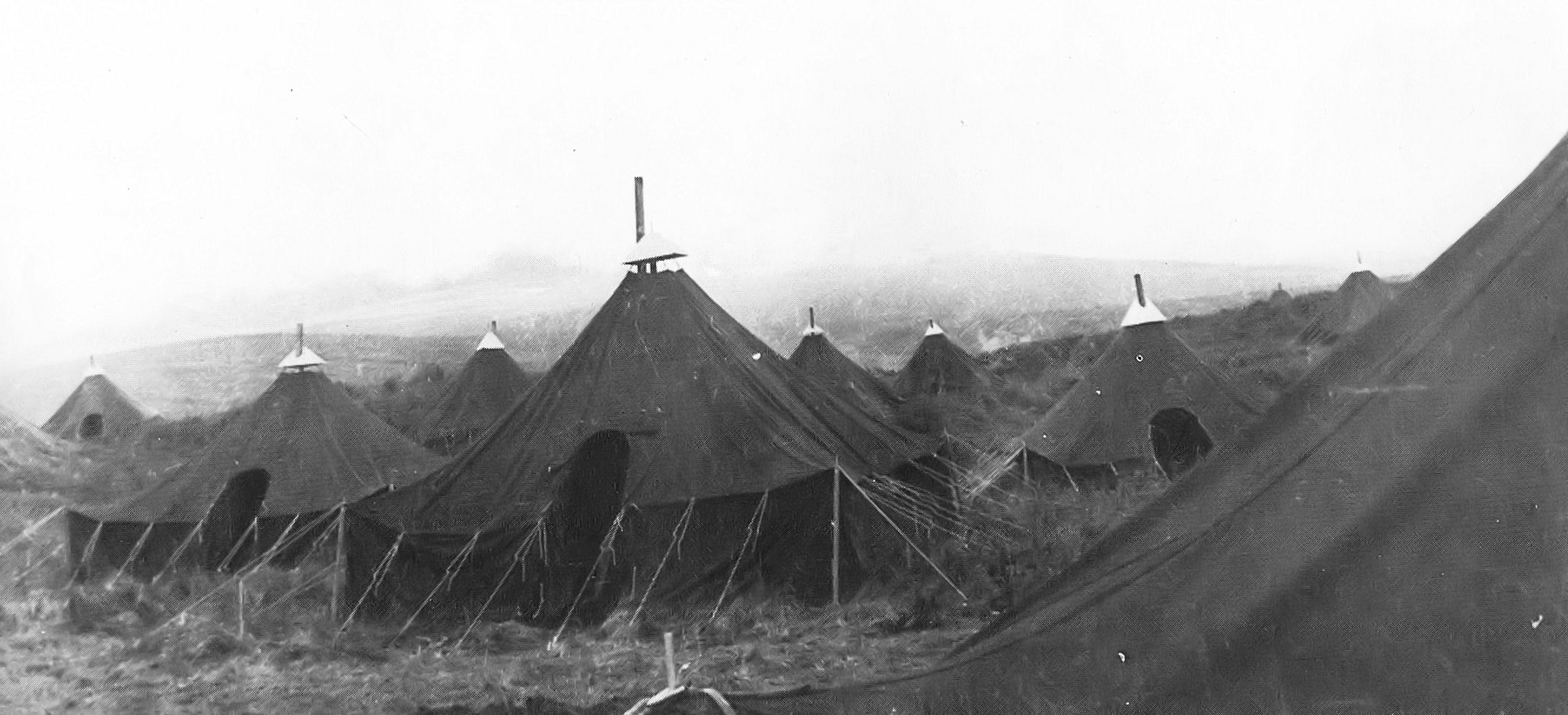
Personnel tents at Fort Glenn AAB, May 1942

Plans called for three hard-surfaced runways (four were eventually built), however time was of the essence in the construction of the base, as the air defense of Dutch Harbor was dependent on them. Instead of a hard surface, engineers chose to use a new material, Pierced Steel Planking (PSP), which could be laid down quickly over a compressed gravel subsurface to provide the airfield with an all-weather capability. There were 80,000 pieces of matting which needed to be barged to the island. Construction crews worked in three shifts, 24 hours a day laying down the runways and constructing a rudimentary support station, water and sewer lines, an electrical grid, communications, fuel and munitions storage sites and all the other necessities to convert a remote island site into an operational airfield capable of supporting heavy bombers. A 5,000' PSP runway was completed on 5 April although a C-53 was first plane to land on the field was on 31 March. The main runway was officially opened on 23 May. Fort Glenn's first runway was then the U.S. Army's most westerly airfield in the Aleutian Islands."

The first operational unit, the 11th Fighter Squadron, moved into Fort Glenn with P-40 Warhawk fighters on 26 May from Elmendorf Field. Additional construction continued throughout 1942 with four 5'000 x 175 foot runways were completed (06/24, 07/35), two of which (03/21, 04/22) were situated only 10 degrees apart. All runways had four layers of asphalt laid down over the PSP. Two additional emergency landing fields were built, one on the north coast of the island (North Shore) 53°30′45″N 167°55′18″W, 9.4 miles north; the other 7.7 miles to the west-southwest of the base near the Tullk Volcano (Pacifier) 53°19′35″N 168°03′23″W.

Morrison-Knudsen Construction Company built hundreds of Quonset hut structures on the base, replacing the temporary tents which exposed the construction crews to the sudden storms which swept the island frequently. Housing & messing facilities for 119 officers & 359 men were constructed as well as recreational and service buildings. Storage facilities consisted of 6,975 square feet for general stores & a 150-cubic-foot freezer. Buildings for aircraft included a kodiak-type hangar, 160' x 90', a squadron warehouse, and a terminal for air transport service. Administration offices were housed in 5 buildings with a total floor space of 3,850 square feet. Radio facilities included a transmitting station, a direction-finder station, and a radar station, all with separate power houses & with housing & messing provisions for personnel. The hospital, located in one small building, contained 8 beds. The maintenance force of the station was installed in 7 buildings. Electric power was provided by 3 diesel-electric generators.

=== Aleutian Islands Campaign ===
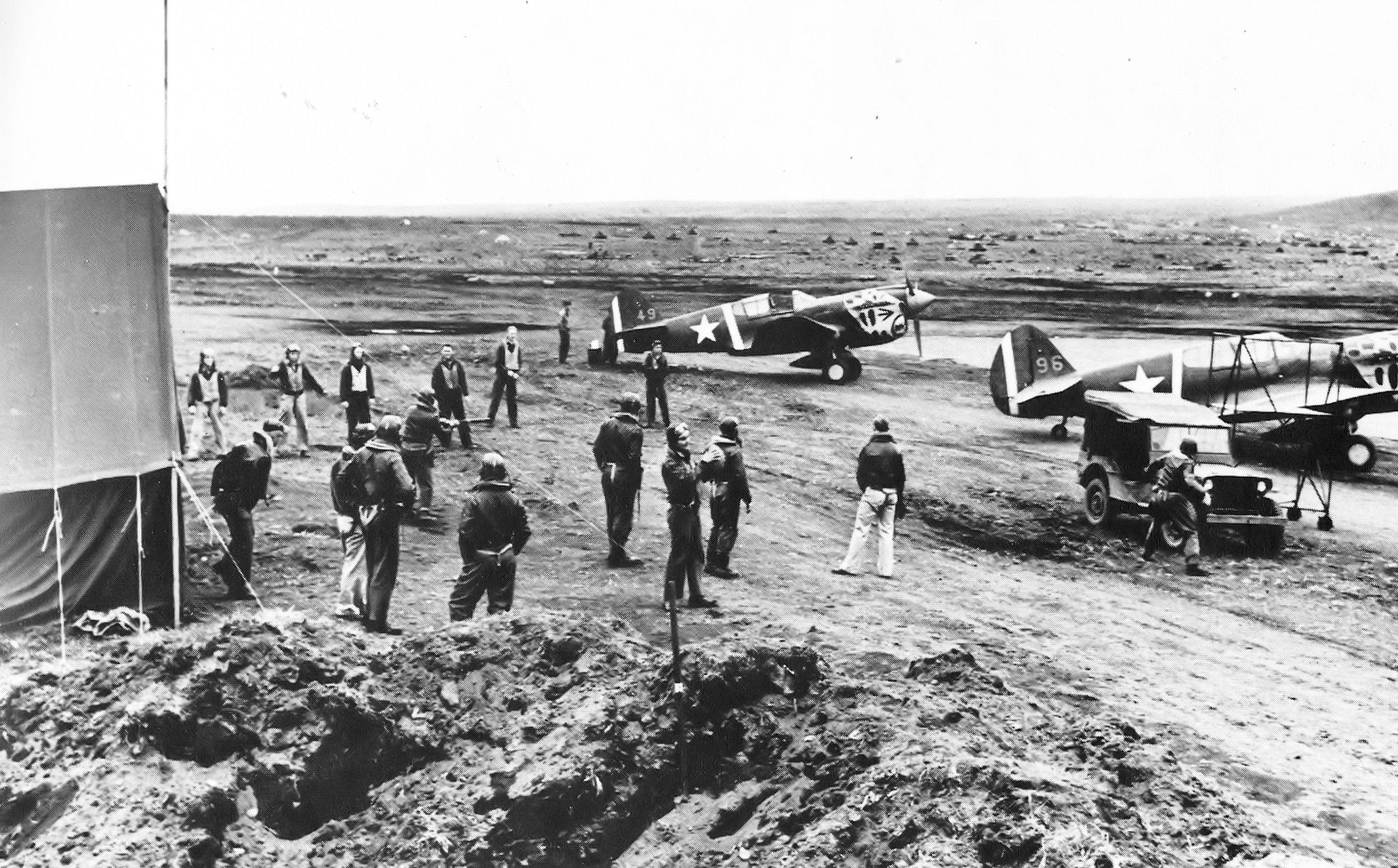
11th Fighter Squadron P-40 Warhawks at Fort Glenn AAB, June 1942.

On 3 June 1942 the Imperial Japanese Navy launched two aircraft carrier raids on the United States Army barracks and the US Navy base at Dutch Harbor on nearby Amaknak Island. The attack was a surprise, however the base been on alert for an attack for many days, although there was no specific warning of the attack before the Japanese planes arrived over Dutch Harbor. The attack signaled the beginning of the Aleutian Islands Campaign. In response, the P-40s of the 11th Fighter Squadron from Fort Glenn AAB along with Naval land-based fighters attacked the Japanese aircraft. Eleventh Air Force also dispatched aircraft from Elmendorf Field. In the ensuring battle, the United States Navy lost four PBYs, and Eleventh AF lost one B-17, two Martin B-26 Marauders and one LB-30 (B-24A) bombers and two P-40 fighters. The Japanese lost two A6M "Zero" fighters, and possibly a third due to ground anti-aircraft fire. One A6M "Zero", three D3A "Val" dive bombers and one E8N "Dave"reconnaissance seaplane were shot down in aerial combat.

Eleventh Air Force also dispatched B-26 Marauder medium bombers of the 77th Bombardment Squadron. They arrived about noon to locate the Japanese aircraft carriers and counterattack, however they landed at Fort Glenn about 1:30pm due to fog and low visibility. The Marauders were carrying airborne torpedoes, rather than contact bombs which they were designed to carry. In addition to the Dutch Harbor attack, Japanese forces landed on Kiska Island on 6 June; Attu Island on 7 June, seizing both.

The Japanese attacks on Dutch Harbor, however inflicted only minor damage on the base, which were quickly repaired. The mission of Fort Glenn Army Air Base was changed to serve as the initial forward base to launch bombing attacks against the Japanese forces in the Aleutians. Known Air Force units deployed to Fort Glenn were:

- 28th Bombardment Group

21st Bombardment Squadron, LB-30 Liberator

Assigned to Hamilton Field, California, TDY to Fort Glenn AAB beginning 11 June 1942
Assigned to Fort Glenn AAB, 3 September 1942-19 September 1943

36th Bombardment Squadron, B-17E Flying Fortress, LB-30 Liberator

Assigned to Elmendorf Field, Alaska Territory, TDY to Fort Glenn AAB beginning 4 June 1942-1 May 1943

73d Bombardment Squadron, B-25 Mitchell

Assigned to Elmendorf Field, Alaska Territory, TDY to Fort Glenn AAB beginning June 1942
Assigned to Fort Glenn AAB, April–June 1943

77th Bombardment Squadron, B-25 Mitchell, B-26 Marauder

Assigned to Elmendorf Field, Alaska Territory, TDY to Fort Glenn AAB beginning 30 May-3 October 1942

404th Bombardment Squadron, B-24 Liberator

Assigned to Will Rogers Field, Oklahoma, TDY to Fort Glenn AAB beginning 24 August-13 September 1942

- 343d Fighter Group

11th Fighter Squadron, P-40 Warhawk

Assigned to Elmendorf Field, Alaska Territory, TDY to Fort Glenn AAB beginning 26 May–June 1942
Assigned to Fort Glenn AAB, June 1942-20 February 1943

54th Fighter Squadron, P-40 Warhawk

Assigned to Elmendorf Field, Alaska Territory, TDY to Fort Glenn AAB beginning 6 June-19 September 1942

344th Fighter Squadron, P-40 Warhawk

Assigned to Fort Glenn AAB, 8 March-23 May 1943

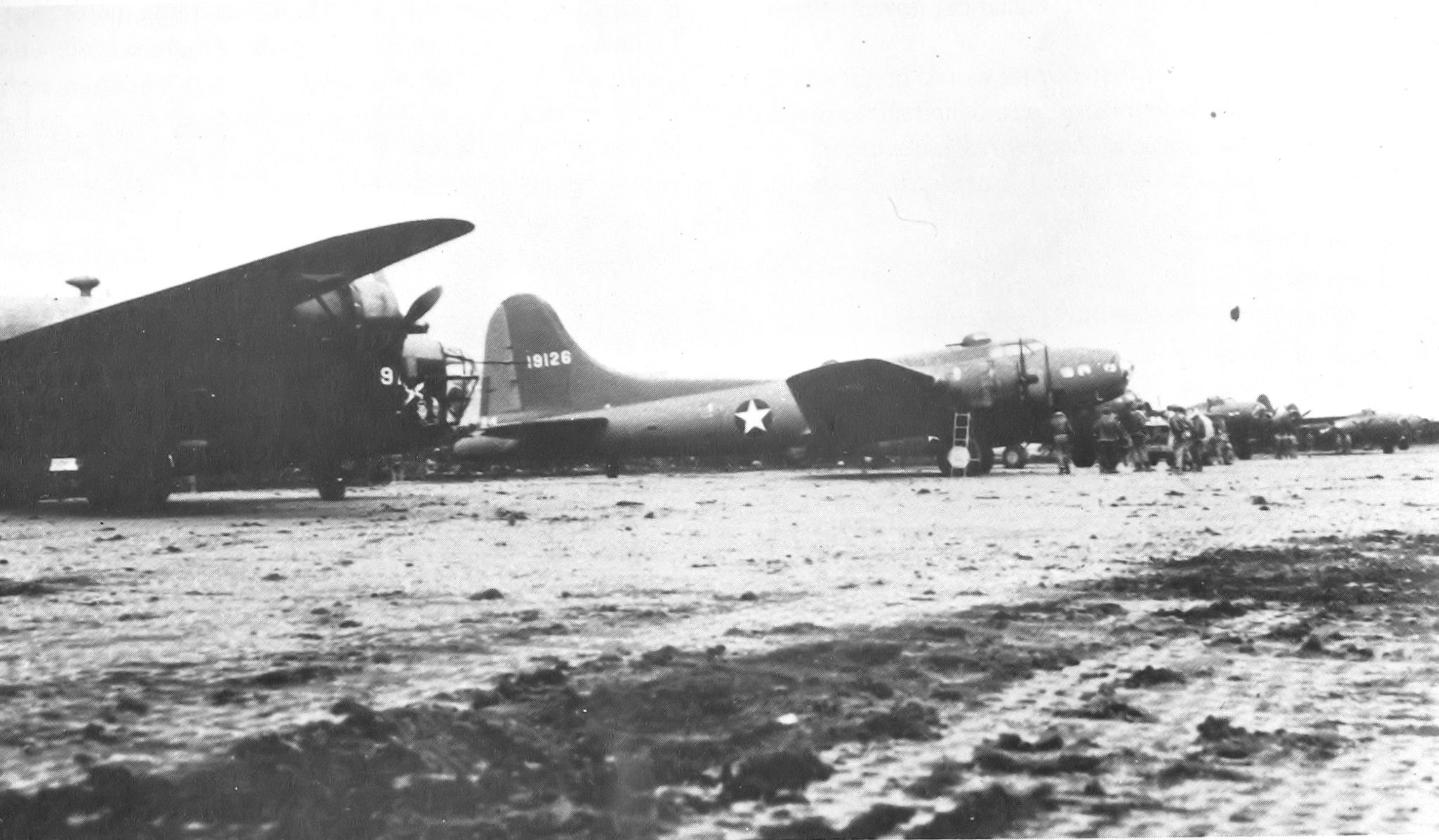
36th Bombardment Squadron LB-30 Liberator and a Boeing B-17E Fortress (41-9126) at Fort Glenn AAB, June 1942.

By the close of 1942, Fort Glenn AAB had 10,579 personnel assigned, but its role as an advance air base had been supplanted by new air bases on Adak and Amchitka Islands in early 1943 farther to the west. By the end of the year, the base had become a backwater; its mission had become the provision of housing and rations for transient personnel and the servicing of transient aircraft.

=== Closure ===
After the war ended, Fort Glenn remained open as a refueling stop for transient aircraft in the Aleutians along with Military Air Transport Service flights using the Great Circle Route from Japan to the United States. The main runway, however was extended to 8,300' to accommodate large, long range aircraft. By 1946, the base was manned only by skeleton staff due to the rapid demobilization of the Air Force.

The last Air Force personnel were withdrawn by 30 September 1947, and the base was put on inactive status and was effectively abandoned. It was decommissioned in 1950 and the site was excessed between 1952 and 1955 to the Bureau of Land Management. The land was later transferred to a variety of owners, including Alaska Native corporations and the State of Alaska. Today hundreds of buildings, runways, and World War II artillery emplacements remain in various states of deterioration.

Today Fort Glenn AAF is a virtual ghost town—except for a family of cattle ranchers who have renovated several World War II buildings and who call the base home. The expanse and undisturbed quality of the resource make Fort Glenn AAF an outstanding conceptual model for landscape preservation. In 1991, National Park Service historians visited the site to review the World War II-related construction, infrastructure, landscape, and objects.

It was determined that any environmental cleanup should be designed to remove loose cables, transformers, hazardous material, toxic waste, and ordnance. Nontoxic World War II-related objects such as empty barrels could be left in place; full barrels would be, of course, another issue. All other buildings, structures, and infrastructure—no matter how "unsightly"—would be left intact and preserved: in this case preservation can simply mean avoidance and the acceptance that the buildings and structures have a definite place within the landscape.

On Saturday July 12, 2008, nearby Mount Okmok, erupted, sending ash 50,000 feet in the air and forcing the evacuation of the residents of the ranch. The eruption obliterated all remains of the South Pacifier Emergency landing strip, although some evidence of remains still are visible in aerial imagery.

== See also ==
- List of National Historic Landmarks in Alaska
- National Register of Historic Places listings in Aleutians West Census Area, Alaska
