= Yukon Island =

Archaeological site in Alaska, United States

- Location within Alaska

Geography
- Location: Kachemak Bay
- Coordinates: 59°31′21″N 151°29′36″W
- Highest elevation: 43 ft (13.1 m)

Administration
- United States of America
- State: Alaska
- Borough: Kenai Peninsula Borough
- Yukon Island Main Site
- U.S. National Register of Historic Places
- U.S. National Historic Landmark
- Alaska Heritage Resources Survey
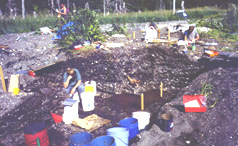
- Excavations at the Yukon Island Main Site
- Location: Address restricted
- Nearest city: Homer, Alaska
- NRHP reference No.: 66000955
- AHRS No.: SEL-001

Significant dates
- Added to NRHP: October 15, 1966
- Designated NHL: December 29, 1962

Yukon Island is an island in outer Kachemak Bay, an inlet of the Cook Inlet of south central Alaska. The island is located about 9 miles (14 km) south of Homer. The island is archaeologically sensitive, with a number of sites documenting the prehistory of the bay. The Yukon Island Main Site, a National Historic Landmark, is a major shell midden site at which the archaeologist Frederica de Laguna was able to sequence 1500 years of the area's prehistory, and other sites have been found on the island since then. The island is now home to an educational retreat center.

== Description ==
Yukon Island is a heavily wooded island, about 1 mile (1.6 km) wide and 1.3 miles (2.1 km) long. It has a rocky shoreline with steep, eroding cliffs, and a rugged interior forested with sitka spruce and hemlock. Its highest point has an elevation of about 500 feet (150 m). The island subsided by about 2 feet (0.61 m) as a result of the 1964 Alaska earthquake, resulting in significant erosion along its shores.

The island is located near the south shore of the mouth of Kachemak Bay, an inlet on the east side of Cook Inlet. The bay is a biologically rich environment in comparison to Cook Inlet and the outer shores of the Kenai Peninsula. Its location is of strategic benefit to small craft negotiating the coastline.

== Archaeology ==
The Main Site on the island was discovered in 1924, at which time ancient female human remains were discovered in an eroding shell midden. The site was investigated in depth by Frederica de Laguna in the 1930s, as a result of which she was able to construct a 1500-year chronology of use. Her work laid the foundation for later research in the region, which has largely confirmed her initial timeline. This site has been a regular subject of archaeological research; it was designated a National Historic Landmark in 1962, and was listed on the National Register of Historic Places in 1966. This site was particularly affected by the 1964 earthquake, and is subject to erosion.

A detailed survey of the island identified five additional midden sites in 1976. One of these, designated SEL-041, has a midden 12 feet (3.7 m) deep, with historical refuse on top of it. The midden is part of what is interpreted as a village site, which has yielded radio carbon dates of CE 1100–1300.

== Yukon Island Center ==
The Yukon Island Center is an educational retreat center located on a small portion of the island. Built on land cleared in the 1970s, its construction and opening were delayed by the discovery of archaeological sites at its planned location. Opened in 1991, it hosts education groups of 50–60 people.

== See also ==
- List of National Historic Landmarks in Alaska
- National Register of Historic Places listings in Kenai Peninsula Borough, Alaska
