= Sitka Spruce Park =

- Sitka Spruce Plantation
- U.S. National Register of Historic Places
- U.S. National Historic Landmark
- Alaska Heritage Resources Survey
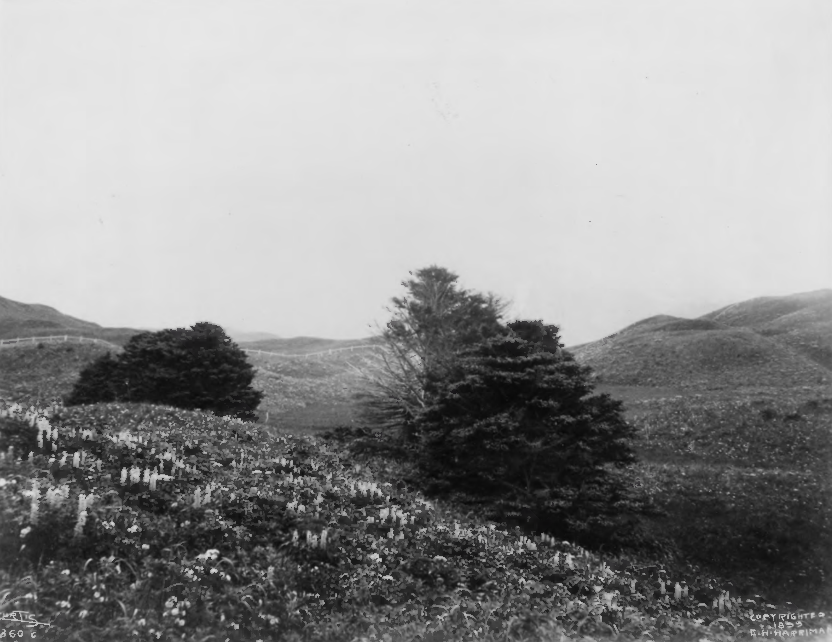
- An 1899 photograph of the plantation

- Location within Alaska
- Nearest city: Unalaska, Alaska
- Coordinates: 53°53′17″N 166°32′40″W
- Area: less than 1 acre
- Built: 1805
- NRHP reference No.: 78000513
- AHRS No.: UNL-074

Significant dates
- Added to NRHP: February 14, 1978
- Designated NHL: June 02, 1978
- Designated AHRS: December 15, 1975

Sitka Spruce Park is a public park in the city of Unalaska, Alaska. The roughly 5-acre (2.0 ha) park is located on Biorka Drive on Amaknak Island, south of Unalaska Airport. It is one of the few places on the island where there are a significant number of trees. A small part of the park is a National Historic Landmark, as it was the site of the earliest documented afforestation in North America. In 1805, Russian agents planted an unknown number of Sitka spruce trees in the area, of which six were documented to be surviving in 1978.

== History ==
Amaknak Island was naturally treeless, lying well outside the known growing range for trees in either Alaska or Siberia. The forestation attempt was ordered in 1805 by Nikolai Petrovich Rezanov, a principal in the Russian-American Company who had secured a monopoly on the fur trade in the area. It was reported ten years later that only a small number of trees were still alive. In 1834 Bishop Ivan Veniaminov reported that there were 24 trees, several of which were more than 7 feet (2.1 m) tall. Veniaminov spearheaded a second forestation effort at a second site on Expedition Island, about 1 mile (1.6 km) south of the first site.

The site was first documented by a professional botanist in 1899 when Bernhard Fernow visited Unalaska Island with the Harriman Alaska Expedition. At that time there were 19 trees, the tallest over 30 feet (9.1 m). The site has since then been the subject of periodic reports. Prior to World War II there ten trees standing, four of which were probably killed as a result of the United States Army's partial filling in of a nearby pond with gravel.

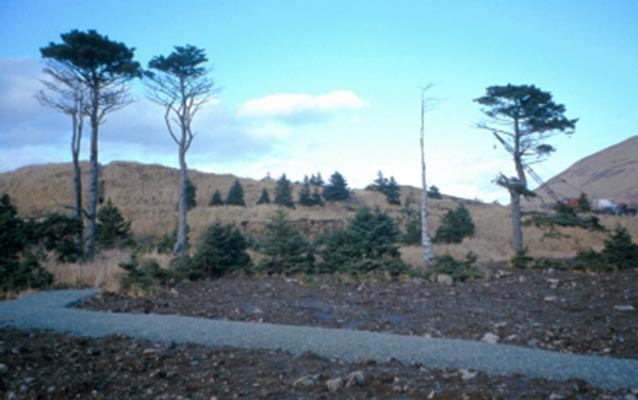
The plantation c. 2013

As of 1975, six of the originally planted trees still stood. The site was declared a National Historic Landmark and listed on the National Register of Historic Places in 1978.

== See also ==
- List of National Historic Landmarks in Alaska
- National Register of Historic Places listings in Aleutians West Census Area, Alaska
