= Adugak Island =

Small island in the Fox Islands group of Alaska, US

Coordinates: 52°54′17″N 169°10′28″W

Location in Alaska

Adugak Island (also spelled Adougakh, possibly from Aleut: Adudak; (Unangam Tunuu: Adugax̂) is a small island in the Fox Islands group in the Aleutian Islands of southwestern Alaska. It is about 1.2 miles (2 km) long and is located 5.0 miles (8 km) off the northwest coast of Umnak Island.

== Name ==
The name was recorded in 1840 by Ivan Veniaminov. It may arise from the word "Adudak", which means "somewhat long".

== Geography ==
The island about 1.2 miles (2 km) long and is located 5.0 miles (8 km) off the northwest coast of Umnak Island. It reaches an elevation of about 102 feet (31 m) above sea level and the area around the island is extremely hazardous to ships because of the numerous rocks that lie just below the surface of the water.

== Wildlife ==
The island has been protected as a rookery for the endangered Steller sea lion, which has been observed during the winter feeding on the fish that inhabit the water nearby.

Cassin's auklet once lived in the area, but disappeared. They also disappeared from other Aleutian islands such as Keegaloo, and Ilak Island due to introduced predators, oil spills, and mortality from fisheries interactions.

Some animals on the island were tested positive for Polydnavirus, along with Yunaska.
