= List of National Natural Landmarks in Alaska =

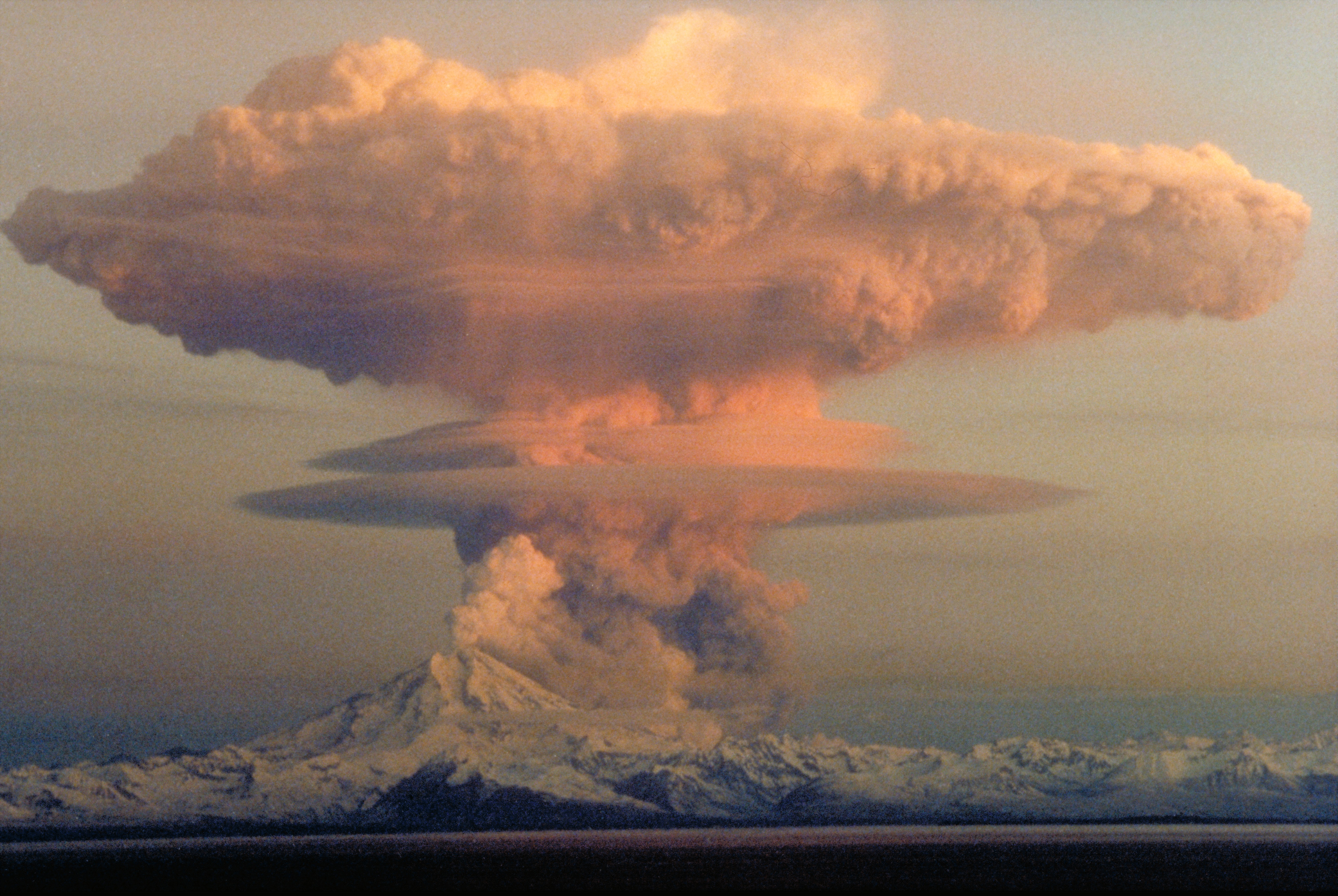
The Redoubt Volcano was designated a National Natural Landmark in 1976, and erupted in 1990.

The National Natural Landmarks in Alaska include 16 of the almost 600 National Natural Landmarks (NNLs) in the United States. They cover areas of geological and biological importance, and include craters, volcanoes, glaciers, lakes, islands and habitats for several rare species. The first set of five designations was made in 1967, while the most recent were made when two new sites were designated in 1976. Six landmarks are found within the Unorganized Borough, while the rest are located in organized boroughs; Aleutians East Borough holds the most, with four. Natural Landmarks in Alaska range from 170 to 1,800,000 acres (69 to 728,434 ha; 0.27 to 2,812.50 sq mi) in size. Owners include private individuals and several state and federal agencies.

The National Natural Landmarks Program is administered by the National Park Service, a branch of the Department of the Interior. The National Park Service determines which properties meet NNL criteria and, after notifying the owners, makes nomination recommendations. The Secretary of the Interior reviews nominations and, based on a set of predetermined criteria, makes a decision on NNL designation or a determination of eligibility for designation. Both public and privately owned properties can be designated as NNLs. Owners may object to the nomination of the property as a NNL. This designation provides indirect, partial protection of the historic integrity of the properties via tax incentives, grants, monitoring of threats, and other means.

Alaska National Natural Landmarks (clickable map)

== National Natural Landmarks ==
Name	Image	Date	Location	Borough	Ownership	Description
Aniakchak Crater	Aerial view of large, snowy crater, surrounded by mountains	1967	56.905833°N 158.208889°W	Lake and Peninsula Borough	Federal	Part of the Aniakchak National Monument and Preserve and containing Surprise Lake, this volcanic caldera last erupted in 1931 and is one of the world's largest explosive craters.
Arrigetch Peaks	Snow-capped mountains	1968	67.416667°N 154.183333°W	Unorganized Borough	Federal	Located in Gates of the Arctic National Park, granite peaks tower above glacial valleys of tundra and boreal forest, demonstrating abrupt rock type transitions from metamorphic to granitic.
Bogoslof Island	Aerial view of irregularly-shaped island with prominent rocky outcroppings	1967	53.927222°N 168.034444°W	Unorganized Borough	Federal	A volcanic island with new eruptions as recently as 1992, Bogoslof provides habitat for endangered Steller sea lions and several bird species. A unit of Alaska Maritime National Wildlife Refuge.
Clarence Rhode National Wildlife Range	A wide river moving through a plain, with many tributaries joining along its length	1968	61.000556°N 163.000556°W	Unorganized Borough	Federal, state, private	A coastal and upland tundra habitat of lakes, streams and tide flats, forming the nesting grounds for several species of birds, including black brant, cackling and emperor geese.
Iliamna Volcano	A snow-covered mountain, with a plume of steam and gas rising from the top	1976	60.033333°N 153.066667°W	Kenai Peninsula Borough	Federal	Active stratovolcano with a 10,016-foot (3,053 m) summit and at least 10 glaciers. A part of Lake Clark National Park and Preserve.
Lake George	A plain covered in ice and water, surrounded by mountains	1967	61.25°N 148.616667°W	Unorganized Borough	Federal, state, private	At the time of its designation, Lake George, dammed by the Knik Glacier, was the largest glacier-dammed lake in North America.
Malaspina Glacier	Aerial view of a large glacier, surrounded by mountains	1968	59.919167°N 140.532778°W	Yakutat City and Borough	Federal, state, private	Noted by explorers for over two centuries, Malaspina is the largest piedmont glacier in North America, and one of the largest worldwide, outside of ice-cap regions. Mostly located within Wrangell-St. Elias National Park and Preserve.
McNeil River State Game Sanctuary	A bear standing in a rushing steam with rocky banks	1968	59.016667°N 154.466667°W	Kenai Peninsula Borough	State	Permanent sanctuary for brown bears and other animal populations. Concentration of bears fishing in the McNeil River provides excellent opportunities for viewing.
Mount Veniaminof	A snow-covered mountain with a plume of steam rising from the top	1967	56.198056°N 159.390833°W	Aleutians East Borough	Federal	Located in Alaska Peninsula National Wildlife Refuge, Veniaminof contains a cupped ice field of 25 square miles (64.75 km^{2}), the most extensive crater-glacier in the US, and an active volcanic vent. The glacial vent is the only such one in North America.
Redoubt Volcano	Snow-capped mountains, with a large plume of steam rising from one peak	1976	60.485278°N 152.743056°W	Kenai Peninsula Borough	Federal	An active stratovolcano located in Lake Clark National Park. Of 76 major volcanoes in the Alaska Peninsula and Aleutian Islands, Redoubt is the second tallest.
Shishaldin Volcano	A snow-covered mountain with a small puff of steam rising from the top	1967	54.755833°N 163.9675°W	Aleutians East Borough	Federal	Located in Izembek National Wildlife Refuge, Shishaldin is an explosive stratovolcano with a near perfect cone. It is the tallest volcano in Unimak Island.
Simeonof National Wildlife Refuge	A lake, surrounded by greenery, with large hills in the background	1968	54.89479124°N 159.273751°W	Aleutians East Borough	Federal	Provides habitat for numerous mammal and bird species, as well as providing ideal habitat and hauling grounds for sea otters.
Unga Island	A plain strewn with large boulders and small puddles of water, with large hills in the background	1968	55.260556°N 160.695°W	Aleutians East Borough	State, private	Part of the Alaska Maritime National Wildlife Refuge, Unga holds the petrified remains of a sequoia or metasequoia forest buried by Tertiary Period volcanic activity. The forest remnants provide evidence of the environment and climate of Alaska before humans reached the area.
Walker Lake	A large lake, surrounded by greenery, with mountains in the background	1968	67.126667°N 154.363056°W	Northwest Arctic Borough	Federal, state, private	An example of a mountain lake at the northern limit of forest growth, demonstrating an ecological range from white spruce to talus slopes, devoid of growth, rising 2,000 feet (610 m) above the lake.
Walrus Islands	Walrus Islands	1968	57.182617°N 169.946822°W	Unorganized Borough	State	The only significant bull walrus haul-out in the US and the southernmost primary area in the world. Seven islands make up the Walrus Islands State Game Sanctuary.
Worthington Glacier	A large glacier sloping down a mountain	1968	61.170278°N 145.763333°W	Unorganized Borough	State	One of the most road-accessible glaciers in Alaska, showing examples of major glacial features ranging from terminal moraines to accumulation zones.

== See also ==
- List of National Historic Landmarks in Alaska
