= List of National Historic Landmarks in Alaska =

The National Historic Landmarks in Alaska represent Alaska's history from its Russian heritage to its statehood. There are 50 National Historic Landmarks (NHLs) in the state. The United States National Historic Landmark program is operated under the auspices of the National Park Service, and recognizes structures, districts, objects, and similar resources according to a list of criteria of national significance. Major themes include Alaska's ancient cultures, Russian heritage, and role in World War II, but other stories are represented as well. In addition, two sites in Alaska were designated National Historic Landmarks, but the designation was later withdrawn. These sites appear in a separate table further below.

The National Historic Landmark Program is administered by the National Park Service, a branch of the Department of the Interior. The National Park Service determines which properties meet NHL criteria and makes nomination recommendations after an owner notification process. The Secretary of the Interior reviews nominations and, based on a set of predetermined criteria, makes a decision on NHL designation or a determination of eligibility for designation. Both public and privately owned properties can be designated as NHLs. This designation provides indirect, partial protection of the historic integrity of the properties via tax incentives, grants, monitoring of threats, and other means. Owners may object to the nomination of the property as an NHL. When this is the case the Secretary of the Interior can only designate a site as eligible for designation.

== Key ==
	National Historic Landmark
^{†}	National Historic Landmark District
^{#}	National Historic Site, National Historical Park, National Memorial, or National Monument
^{*}	Delisted Landmark

== NHLs in Alaska ==
The table below lists all of the National Historic Landmark sites, along with added detail and description.

	Landmark name	Image	Date designated	Location	County	Description
1	Adak Army Base and Adak Naval Operating Base	Adak Army Base and Adak Naval Operating Base	February 27, 1987 (#87000841)	Adak Station; 51°52′19″N 176°38′10″W	Aleutians West	Established in 1942 as part of World War II, this military base was the launching pad for the American attack on the Japanese-held Aleutian Islands of Kiska and Attu.
2	Alaska Native Brotherhood Hall	Alaska Native Brotherhood Hall	June 2, 1978 (#72000192)	235 Katlian Street, Sitka; 57°03′03″N 135°20′28″W	Sitka	This 1914 meeting hall and headquarters building served the original chapter of Alaska Native Brotherhood, founded by Tlingits in the early 1900s to fight discrimination and represent interests of natives.
3^{†}	Amalik Bay Archeological District	Amalik Bay Archeological District	April 5, 2005 (#05000460)	Address restricted, Katmai National Park and Preserve	Kodiak Island	An archeological site located in Kodiak Island Borough
4	American Flag Raising Site	American Flag Raising Site	June 13, 1962 (#66000162)	On Castle Hill, Sitka; 57°02′55″N 135°20′16″W	Sitka	In 1867, site of Russian flag lowering and American flag raising marking the transfer of Alaska to the U.S.; in 1959, after Alaska admitted as 49th state, site of first official raising of 49-star U.S. flag; also known as Castle Hill and Baranof Castle.
5	Anangula Site	Anangula Site	June 2, 1978 (#78000512)	Nikolski; 53°00′02″N 168°54′40″W	Aleutians West	Site of earliest signs of human occupation in the Aleutian Islands.
6	Attu Battlefield and U.S. Army and Navy Airfields on Attu	Attu Battlefield and U.S. Army and Navy Airfields on Attu	February 4, 1985 (#85002729)	Attu Island; 52°54′02″N 172°54′34″E	Aleutians West	Site of bloody battle in which only 29 of 2,500 Japanese survived, only land battle on U.S. soil during World War II.
7	Bering Expedition Landing Site	Bering Expedition Landing Site	June 2, 1978 (#77001542)	On Kayak Island; 59°53′40″N 144°29′08″W	Valdez-Cordova	Site of first recorded contacts between natives and Europeans
8	Birnirk Site	Birnirk Site	December 29, 1962 (#66000953)	Address restricted, Barrow	North Slope	Sixteen prehistoric mounds of the Birnirk and Thule cultures.
9^{†}	Brooks River Archeological District	Brooks River Archeological District	April 19, 1993 (#78000342)	Address restricted, Katmai National Park and Preserve	Lake and Peninsula	An archaeological site located along an ancient beach and modern river. There are twenty separate well preserved sites which have provided a large number of Arctic Small Tool Tradition artifacts.
10^{†}	Cape Krusenstern Archeological District	Cape Krusenstern Archeological District	November 7, 1973 (#73000378)	Address restricted, Kotzebue	Northwest Arctic	The archeological district comprises 114 ancient beach ridges which formed nearly 60 years apart. They provide a rare sequential look at over 5000 years of inhabitation.
11^{†}	Cape Nome Mining District Discovery Sites	Cape Nome Mining District Discovery Sites	June 2, 1978 (#78000535)	Nome; 64°33′49″N 165°22′17″W	Nome	Significant for role in the history of gold mining in Alaska
12	Chaluka Site	Chaluka Site	December 29, 1962 (#66000155)	Address restricted, Nikolski	Aleutians West	Includes a large mound; yields information about origins of Aleuts
13^{†}	Chilkoot Trail and Dyea Site	Chilkoot Trail and Dyea Site	June 16, 1978 (#75002120)	Skagway; 59°35′14″N 135°19′56″W	Skagway	Major access route from the coast to Yukon goldfields in the late 1890s.
14	Church of the Holy Ascension	Church of the Holy Ascension	April 15, 1970 (#70000112)	Unalaska; 53°52′33″N 166°32′11″W	Aleutians West	Built in 1826 by the Russian American Fur Company to help acclimate indigenous population in Russian Alaska.
15	Dry Creek Archeological Site	Dry Creek Archeological Site	June 2, 1978 (#74000442)	Address restricted, near Healy, Alaska	Denali	This archeological site has provided evidence which supports the Bering land bridge theory
16	Dutch Harbor Naval Operating Base and Fort Mears, U.S. Army	Dutch Harbor Naval Operating Base and Fort Mears, U.S. Army	February 4, 1985 (#85002733)	Unalaska; 53°53′16″N 166°32′23″W	Aleutians West	Only U.S. fortifications in the Aleutian Islands prior to bombing of Pearl Harbor, attacked by the Japanese Navy during the Battle of Dutch Harbor in June 1942.
17^{†}	Eagle Historic District	Eagle Historic District	June 2, 1978 (#70000919)	Eagle; 64°47′10″N 141°12′00″W	Southeast Fairbanks	Historic district with over 100 well-preserved buildings from the Gold Rush years on the Yukon River. Roald Amundsen announced his successful traverse of the Northwest Passage from here in 1905
18	Fort Durham Site		June 2, 1978 (#78000529)	Address restricted, near Taku Harbor in Juneau City and Borough, Alaska	Juneau	One of three Hudson's Bay Company posts set up in Alaska
19^{†}	Fort Glenn	Fort Glenn	May 28, 1987 (#87001301)	Fort Glenn; 53°22′39″N 167°53′24″W	Aleutians West	Well preserved World War II defense base.
20^{†}	Fort William H. Seward	Fort William H. Seward	June 2, 1978 (#72000190)	Haines; 59°13′36″N 135°26′41″W	Haines	Last of a series of 11 military posts established in Alaska during the gold rush era
21	Gallagher Flint Station Archeological Site	Gallagher Flint Station Archeological Site	June 2, 1978 (#78003208)	Address restricted, Sagwon	North Slope	Discovered in 1970 during the construction of the Trans-Alaska Pipeline, it was at the time the earliest dated archaeological site in northern Alaska.
22	Holy Assumption Orthodox Church	Holy Assumption Orthodox Church	April 15, 1970 (#70000898)	Kenai; 60°33′11″N 151°16′03″W	Kenai Peninsula	Russian Orthodox church in Kenai, Alaska.
23	Ipiutak Site	Ipiutak Site	January 20, 1961 (#66000157)	Address restricted, Point Hope Peninsula	North Slope	The type site for the Ipiutak culture
24	Iyatayet Site	Iyatayet Site	January 20, 1961 (#66000158)	Address restricted, Cape Denbigh Peninsula	Nome	Shows evidence of several separate cultures, dating back as far as 6000 BC.
25^{†}	Kake Cannery	Kake Cannery	December 9, 1997 (#97001677)	About 1 mile (1.6 km) southwest of Kake; 56°57′53″N 133°55′32″W	Prince of Wales-Hyder	Built 1912-1940; significant for role in history of salmon canning in Alaska
26	Kennecott Mines	Kennecott Mines	June 23, 1986 (#78003420)	East of Kennicott Glacier, about 6.5 miles (10.5 km) north of McCarthy; 61°31′09″N 142°50′29″W	Valdez-Cordova	Site of discovery of copper in 1900 and subsequent mining activities
27^{†}	Kijik Archeological District	Kijik Archeological District	October 12, 1994 (#94001644)	Address restricted, Lake Clark National Park and Preserve	Lake and Peninsula	Related to the history of the Dena'ina Athabaskan Indians
28	Japanese Occupation Site, Kiska Island	Japanese Occupation Site, Kiska Island	February 4, 1985 (#85002732)	Kiska Island; 51°58′02″N 177°29′31″E	Aleutians West	Site of the Japanese occupation of Kiska which along with nearby Attu were the only US land occupied by the Japanese during World War II
29	Kodiak Naval Operating Base and Forts Greely and Abercrombie	Kodiak Naval Operating Base and Forts Greely and Abercrombie	February 4, 1985 (#85002731)	Kodiak; 57°44′19″N 152°30′17″W	Kodiak Island	World War II-related facilities
30^{†}	Ladd Field	Ladd Field	February 4, 1985 (#85002730)	Fairbanks; 64°50′15″N 147°36′52″W	Fairbanks North Star	Primary role during WWII was major stopping point for the Lend-Lease program.
31	Leffingwell Camp Site	Leffingwell Camp Site	June 2, 1978 (#71001093)	On Flaxman Island, about 58 miles (93 km) west of Kaktovik; 70°11′07″N 146°03′10″W	North Slope	Campsite of geologist and polar explorer Ernest de Koven Leffingwell on Arctic coast of Alaska.
32	Nenana (river steamboat)	Nenana (river steamboat)	May 5, 1989 (#72001581)	Pioneer Park, Fairbanks; 64°50′19″N 147°46′20″W	Fairbanks North Star	River steamboat; only surviving wooden one of this type.
33	New Russia Site		June 2, 1978 (#72001593)	South of Kardy Lake, about 3.5 miles (5.6 km) southwest of Yakutat; 59°31′37″N 139°49′36″W	Yakutat	Site of Russian trading post attacked and destroyed by Tlingit natives.
34	Old Sitka	Old Sitka	June 13, 1962 (#66000166)	Mile 6.9 of Halibut Point Road, about 6 miles (9.7 km) north of Sitka; 57°07′46″N 135°22′24″W	Sitka	Also known as the Redoubt St. Archangel Michael Site, this was the site of a Russian-American Company settlement, established in 1799 and destroyed by Tlingit attack in 1802.
35^{†}	Onion Portage Archeological District	Onion Portage Archeological District	June 2, 1978 (#72000191)	Address restricted, Kiana	Northwest Arctic	Perhaps most important archaeological site in Alaska; caribou river crossing; human presence for millennia.
36	Palugvik Site		December 29, 1962 (#66000957)	Address restricted, Hawkins Island	Valdez-Cordova	Includes a large midden yielding information about Eskimo culture in the area.
37	Russian-American Building No. 29	Russian-American Building No. 29	May 28, 1987 (#87001282)	202-206 Lincoln Street, Sitka; 57°02′59″N 135°20′11″W	Sitka	Siding covered log building; dates back to the years after the 1867 purchase of Alaska.
38	Russian-American Magazin	Russian-American Magazin	June 13, 1962 (#66000954)	101 East Marine Way, Kodiak; 57°47′16″N 152°24′12″W	Kodiak Island	Storehouse building associated with the Russian and then the American trading companies active in Alaska.
39	Russian Bishop's House	Russian Bishop's House	June 13, 1962 (#66000025)	501 Lincoln Street, Sitka; 57°03′05″N 135°19′52″W	Sitka	One of four surviving examples of Russian Colonial Style architecture in the Western Hemisphere.
40	St. Michael's Cathedral	St. Michael's Cathedral	June 13, 1962 (#66000165)	240 Lincoln Street, Sitka; 57°03′00″N 135°20′06″W	Sitka	Primary evidence of Russian influence in North America.
41^{†}	Seal Island Historic District	Seal Island Historic District	June 13, 1962 (#66000156)	Pribilof Islands; 57°N 170°W	Aleutians West	Historic buildings related to northern fur seal hunting in the Pribilof Islands and its restriction in 1911 and 1966.
42^{†}	Sheldon Jackson School	Sheldon Jackson School	August 7, 2001 (#72000193) (Note: While the form 72000193 contains 2001 NHLD designation for the entire Sheldon Jackson School, the asset detail page references the original Sheldon Jackson Museum 1972 single-property enlistment.)	801 Lincoln Street, Sitka; 57°03′03″N 135°19′25″W	Sitka	Oldest institution of higher learning in Alaska
43^{†}	Sitka Naval Operating Base and U.S. Army Coastal Defenses	Sitka Naval Operating Base and U.S. Army Coastal Defenses	August 11, 1986 (#86003559)	Japonski Island, Makhnati Island and the causeway connecting them, near Sitka; 57°02′58″N 135°21′35″W	Sitka	Commissioned as Sitka Naval Air Station in October 1939, it was redesignated the Naval Operating Base, July 1942. Protected the North Pacific during World War II.
44	Sitka Spruce Plantation	Sitka Spruce Plantation	June 2, 1978 (#78000513)	Unalaska; 53°53′12″N 166°32′23″W	Aleutians West	First recorded afforestation project in North America; Russian settlers began in 1805; attempt to make Unalaska self-sufficient in timber.
45^{†}	Skagway Historic District and White Pass	Skagway Historic District and White Pass	June 13, 1962 (#66000943)	Skagway and White Pass; 59°27′30″N 135°18′50″W	Skagway	Historic frontier Gold Rush town and trail leading to White Pass on the border of Canada. Over 100 buildings from the era survive, though they are threatened by continued development. Mentioned in The Call of the Wild by Jack London.
46	George C. Thomas Memorial Library	George C. Thomas Memorial Library	June 2, 1978 (#72001542)	Fairbanks; 64°50′41″N 147°43′40″W	Fairbanks North Star	The public library for Fairbanks from its construction in 1909 until the opening of the Noel Wien Public Library in 1977. Site of 1915 meeting between U.S. officials and native Alaskans to settle land claims.
47	Three Saints Bay Site	Three Saints Bay Site	June 2, 1978 (#72001541)	Address restricted, Old Harbor	Kodiak Island	Site of the first Russian settlement in Alaska in 1784.
48^{†}	Wales Site	Wales Site	December 29, 1962 (#66000161)	Address restricted, Wales	Nome	Site of first discovery of how the Thule culture followed the Birnirk culture in precontact whaling populations of the Alaskan shoreline.
49^{†}	Walrus Islands Archeological District	Walrus Islands Archeological District	December 23, 2016 (#100000875)	mouth of Bristol Bay; 58°36′42″N 159°59′27″W	Dillingham Census Area, Alaska	Island group with deeply stratified sites covering 6,000 years of human occupation.
50	Yukon Island Main Site	Yukon Island Main Site	December 29, 1962 (#66000955)	Address restricted, Yukon Island	Kenai Peninsula	Related to the Kachemak Bay Culture.

== Historic areas of the NPS in Alaska ==
National Historic Sites, National Historical Parks, some National Monuments, and certain other areas listed in the National Park System are historic landmarks of national importance that are highly protected already, often before the inauguration of the NHL program in 1960, and are then often not also named NHLs per se. There are three of these in Alaska. The National Park Service lists these three together with the NHLs in the state,

Cape Krusenstern National Monument is also an NHL and is listed above. The other two are:

	Landmark name	Image	Date established	Location	County	Description
1	Klondike Gold Rush National Historical Park			Skagway	Skagway	Park of Klondike Gold Rush, an NHL shared with Seattle, Washington.
2	Sitka National Historical Park			Sitka	Sitka	

== Former NHLs in Alaska ==
	Landmark name	Image	Date designated	Date withdrawn	Locality	Borough or Census Area	Description
1	Gambell Sites		1962	1989	Gambell; 63°46′34″N 171°42′3″W	Nome	These five archeological sites established a chronology of human habitation on St. Lawrence Island, with evidence of four cultural phases of the Thule tradition, beginning about 2000 years before the present. Over the 20th century, the archeological value of the sites was largely destroyed due to ivory mining, and landmark designation was withdrawn.
2	Sourdough Lodge		1978	1994	Gakona; 62°18′07″N 145°18′07″W	Valdez-Cordova	Built of logs in 1903–05, this was one of a number of roadhouses built along the Valdez Trail. It was destroyed by fire in 1992, leading to withdrawal of its landmark status. By the time of its destruction, it was one of the oldest continuously operating roadhouses in Alaska.

== See also ==
- National Register of Historic Places listings in Alaska
- History of Alaska
- Historic preservation
- National Register of Historic Places
- List of U.S. National Historic Landmarks by state
- List of National Natural Landmarks in Alaska
