= Church of the Holy Ascension =

Historic church in Alaska, United States

- U.S. National Register of Historic Places
- U.S. National Historic Landmark
- Alaska Heritage Resources Survey
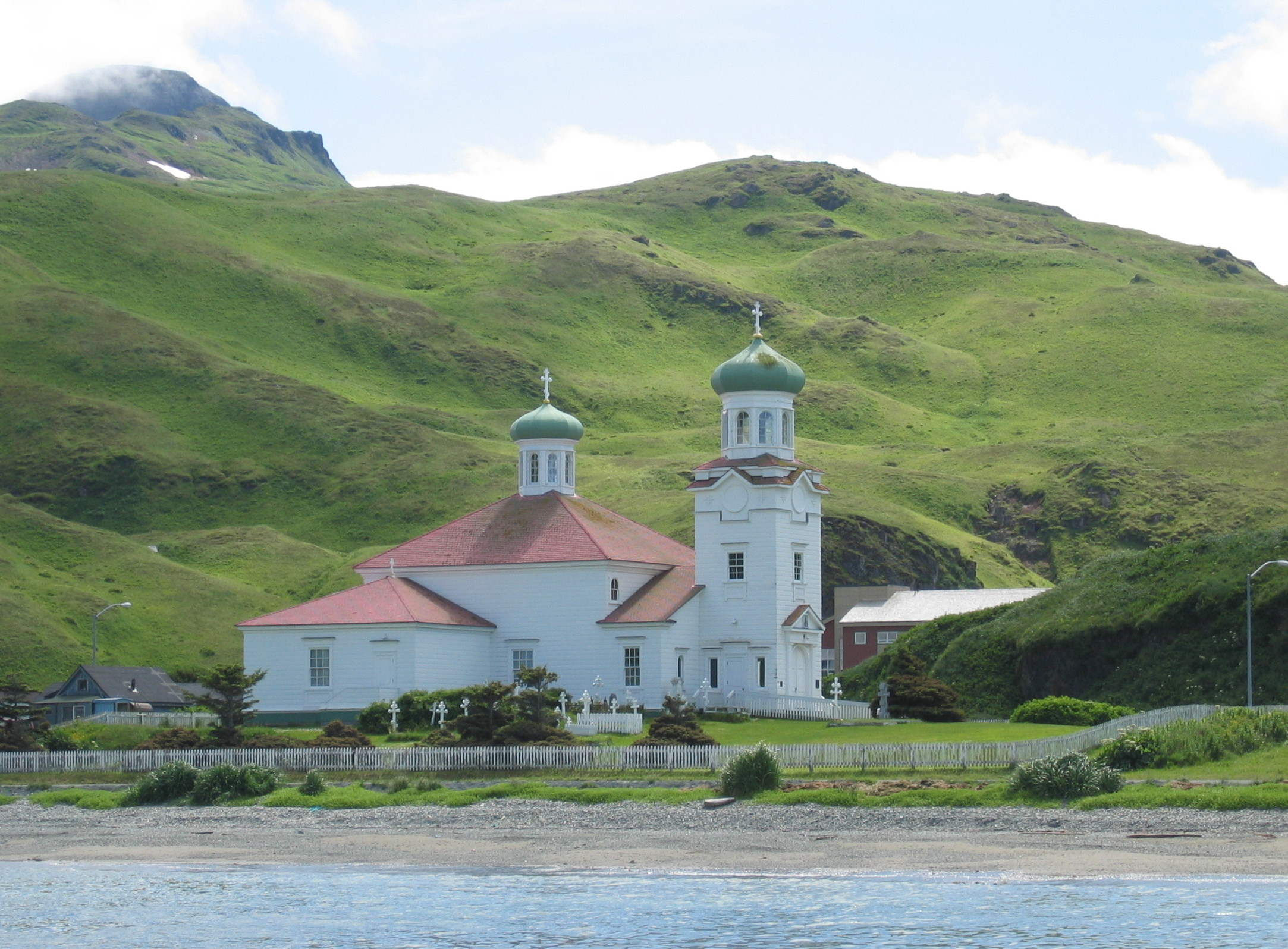
- Church of the Holy Ascension on a sunny day, with red roofs, green onion domes, and a small churchyard.

- Location within Alaska
- Location: Unalaska, Alaska
- Coordinates: 53°52′32″N 166°32′11″W
- Area: 1.5 acres (0.61 ha)
- Built: 1826
- Architect: Mooser & Piser; Alaska Commercial Co.
- MPS: Russian Orthodox Church Buildings and Sites TR (AD)
- NRHP reference No.: 70000112
- AHRS No.: UNL-005

Significant dates
- Added to NRHP: April 15, 1970
- Designated NHL: April 15, 1970
- Designated AHRS: June 6, 1971

The Church of the Holy Ascension (Russian: Церковь Вознесения Господня), also known as the Holy Ascension Orthodox Church, is a prominent landmark in Unalaska, the major community of the western Aleutian Islands in southwestern Alaska. The current church was built in 1894, probably on the site of an 1826 church, and likely using timbers and other elements (including one iconostasis) from the older church. It is one of the oldest churches in Alaska, and is significant as the site from which missionaries brought their religion to the local Aleut people. This evangelization effort was so successful that today's Aleut population is still strongly Orthodox. The church was declared a National Historic Landmark for its architecture, and for its role in the history and culture of Alaska. It is the second cathedral church of the Orthodox Church in America Diocese of Alaska, after St. Michael's Cathedral in Sitka (which is also a National Historic Landmark).

== Description ==
The Church of the Holy Ascension is located in Unalaska, a community of about 4,000 on the north side of Unalaska Island, the largest of the western Aleutian Islands. It stands roughly midway on a peninsula dividing the Ililiuk River and Ililiuk Bay, west of the main part of the community. The church stands on a property known as the "Russian Greek Mission Reserves", a 1.5-acre (0.61 ha) area on which the bishop's residence also stands.

The church is a wood-frame structure, cruciform in shape, with a belltower at its western end. The tower is 52 feet (16 m) tall, starting as a square structure, which rises to a cornice with shallow center gables on each cornice, and an octagonal cupola topped by a green onion dome, which is capped by an Orthodox cross. The tower is connected to the nave of the church by a gable-roofed narthex. The nave is rectangular, with a hip roof capped by a cupola similar to, but smaller than, that on the tower. Hip-roofed wings containing chapels extend north and south from the near the eastern end of the nave. The apse is at the far eastern end of the structure, with a hip roof that rises only to the level of the cornice of the nave. All of the roofs are covered in wooden shingles painted red; the domes are covered in tarpaper which is painted green.

The interior of the church has a fairly uncomplicated layout. The first floor of the tower acts as a vestibule, while the narthex area provides spaces for storage and stairs leading to the choir loft and the belfry, the latter occupying the tower's second level. The floors of the church are wooden, and painted red throughout. A red carpet leads through the nave to the eastern end of the building, where the main iconostasis and altar are located. The chapel to the north is dedicated to Saint Innocent of Irkutsk; that to the south is dedicated to Saint Sergius of Radonezh.

The structure has undergone only modest alterations since its construction in 1894 to 1896, and underwent a major restoration in 1998.

=== Bishop's house ===
The bishop's house stands several hundred feet from the church. It is a modest two-story wood-frame structure, 28 feet (8.5 m) by 32 feet (9.8 m), clad in shiplap siding. Single-story wings extend to the east and west of the main block. The cornices of the second story roofline have elaborately carved friezes and carved wooden corbel blocks.

== History ==
The Aleutian Islands were discovered by Russian fur hunters in the mid-18th century, and a Russian establishment existed at Unalaska as early as 1778, when British Captain James Cook explored the area. The first known religious building, a small chapel, was built in Unalaska in 1808, but there was no regular priest. The first significant effort by the Russian Orthodox establishment to evangelize the local Aleut population began in 1795, when a monk named Macarius arrived at Unalaska and baptized most of the native population. In 1824 Reverend Ivan Veniaminov arrived in Unalaska as its first permanent priest, and led the construction of a church not far from the site of the 1808 chapel. Veniamov, later canonized as Innocent of Alaska, was an energetic force in the growth of the church in western Alaska. He developed an alphabet for the Aleut language, and established a school to teach the natives to read and write. Veniaminov spent ten years in Unalaska before being assigned to Sitka, where he engaged in similar activities with respect to the Tlingit people. He was, during his long career in Alaska, a significant ethnographic resource, noted even by modern historians for the quality of his observations.

By 1858 the church Veniaminov built was failing due to the harsh climate, and a new church was built, using timbers from the older one. In the 1880s, after a period of decline in the church, Bishop Nestor commissioned the construction of the bishop's house after a visit to Unalaska in which his accommodations were in the living quarters of the local cannery workers. As part of this work a school building was also erected, to which the bishop's house was originally attached; this survived until it was destroyed by fire in 1960, singing the walls of the house in the process.

The present church was built from 1894 to 1896, after the arrival of Reverend Alexander Kedrovsky. By this time Unalaska had achieved its place as the major port in the western Aleutians, and had grown into a small town. The district Kedrovsky oversaw extended to include the Fox and Pribilof island groups, and to communities on the Alaskan peninsula. It is believed that the north chapel of the present church is on the location of the original 1826 church, and that timbers were used from the old structure in construction of the new one. There is also evidence suggesting that the iconostasis in that chapel is Aleut craftsmanship dating to 1824.

During World War II, the native population of the area was evacuated to southeastern Alaska. The valuables of the church were preserved, despite the use of the church facilities by the nearly 60,000 troops stationed at Dutch Harbor. Although the population returned, the effects of the relocation were profound, and the church has declined in the region since the war. Icons from smaller community churches are now displayed in the chapel of St. Sergius.

== See also ==
- Oldest churches in the United States
- List of the oldest buildings in Alaska
- List of National Historic Landmarks in Alaska
- National Register of Historic Places listings in Aleutians West Census Area, Alaska
