= William S. Laughlin =

American anthropologist (1919–2001)

- Born: August 26, 1919; Canton, Missouri, U.S.
- Died: April 6, 2001 (aged 81); Portland, Oregon, U.S.
- Education: Willamette University, Haverford College, Harvard University
- Occupation: Anthropologist
- Known for: Research on aboriginal peoples in the Aleutians and Greenland

William S. Laughlin (August 26, 1919 – April 6, 2001) was an American anthropologist who carried on research and wrote about aboriginal peoples in the Aleutians and Greenland.

William Sceva Laughlin was born in Canton, Missouri in 1919. He grew up in Salem, Oregon, where his father was a professor at Willamette University. His education included a bachelor's (Willamette University, 1941) and master's (Haverford College, 1942) degree in sociology, and master's (1948) and Ph.D. (1949) degrees in anthropology from Harvard University. His academic career in anthropology included professorships at the University of Oregon (1949-1955), the University of Wisconsin (1955-1969), and the University of Connecticut (1969-1999). His primary field of specialization was physical anthropology, including Aleutian-Siberian studies, human biology, population history and human evolution. Laughlin first came to Alaska in 1938 as a member of the Smithsonian Expedition to the Aleutian Islands, directed by Dr. Aleš Hrdlička. In 1948, he was the field director for the Peabody Museum's Expedition to the Aleutians. Over the years, he made over twenty trips to the Aleutians to study its peoples. His research there culminated in the publication in 1980 of his book, Aleuts: Survivors of the Bering Land Bridge. He also co-edited the book, The First Americans: Origins, Affinities and Adaptations, with Connecticut colleague, Albert B. Harper. Laughlin was a member or fellow of several professional societies, edited the American Journal for Physical Anthropology (1958-1963), and served on several scientific committees, including the U. S. National Committee for the International Biological Program, the Committee to Evaluate National Science Foundation Programs, and the Programs Advisory Committee of the National Institutes for Dental Research. William S. Laughlin died in Portland, Oregon, in 2001.

== Books ==
- Frohlich, Bruno; Harper, Albert B. and Gilberg, Rolf. (ed.). To the Aleutians and beyond : the anthropology of William S. Laughlin, Copenhagen: Dept. of Ethnography, the National Museum of Denmark, 2002. 382 pp.: ill., maps; 30 cm. ISBN 87-89384-85-7
- Gilberg, R., Jørgensen, J. Balslev, & Laughlin, William S. Anthropometrical and skinfold thickness measurements on the Polar Eskimos, Thule District, North Greenland. Copenhagen: C. A. Reitzel, 1975. 22, [1] pp. : ill.; 29 cm. ISBN 87-421-0103-4
- Laughlin, William S. Aleuts, survivors of the Bering Land Bridge Holt, Rinehart, and Winston, c1980. vii, 151 pp.; ill.; 24 cm. ISBN 0-03-081269-0 (paperback)
- Laughlin, William S., & Harper, Albert B. (ed.); The First Americans: origins, affinities, and adaptations. New York : G. Fischer, 1979. xi, 340 pp.; ill.; 25 cm. ISBN 0-89574-103-2
