= Umnak =

- Island
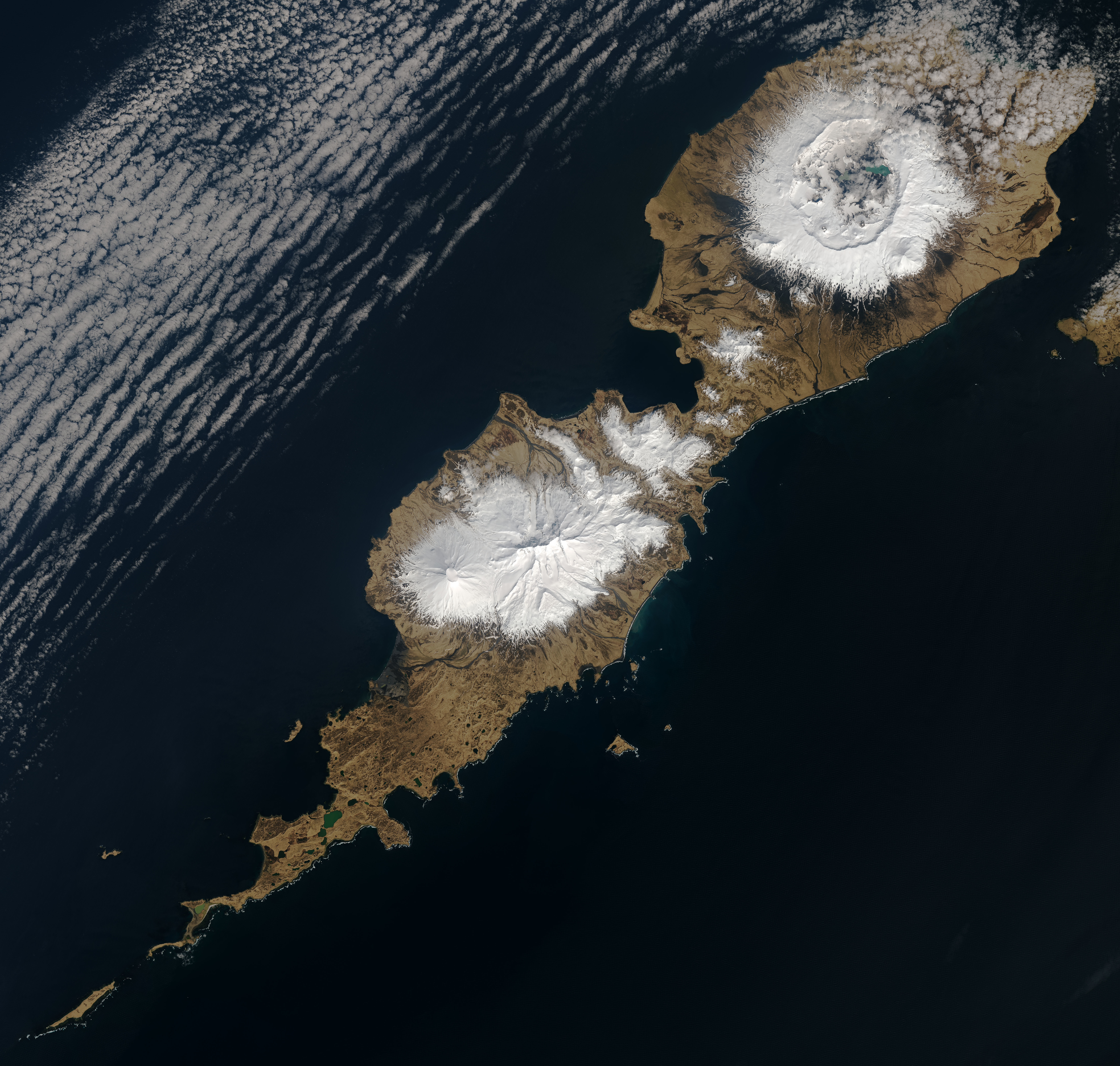
- May 2014 NASA satellite photograph of Umnak

- Location within Alaska
- Coordinates: 53°13′26″N 168°25′55″W
- Country: United States
- State: Alaska
- Archipelago: Fox Islands of the Aleutian Islands

Area
  - Total: 686.01 sq mi (1,776.8 km^{2})
  - Land: 686.01 sq mi (1,776.8 km^{2})
- Highest elevation: 7,051 ft (2,149 m)

Population (2000)
  - Total: 39
  - Density: 0.057/sq mi (0.022/km^{2})
- ZIP code: 99638

Umnak (Aleut: Unmax, Umnax; Russian: Умнак) is one of the Fox Islands of the Aleutian Islands. With 686.01 square miles (1,776.76 km^{2}) of land area, it is the third largest island in the Aleutian archipelago and the 19th largest island in the United States. The island is home to a large volcanic caldera on Mount Okmok and the only field of geysers in Alaska. It is separated from Unalaska Island by Umnak Pass. In 2000, Umnak was permanently inhabited by only 39 people and by 2010, around 18, placing the settlement of Nikolski in difficulty.

== History ==
The earliest known settlement on Umnak Island is at Anangula and is 8,400 years old. Anangula was later abandoned and the Sandy Beach site became occupied, along with Idaliuk and Chaluka. Most of the early settlements on Umnak were located along the streams. A major geologic event was the cutting of strand flats during the Hypsithermal period, about 8250 to 3000 years ago, which led to a greater natural food supply on the island for the settlers.

Umnak Island was first reached by independent Russian fur traders in the 1750s. Abuses by the Russians led to an alliance among Aleuts in the Fox Islands. During the winter of 1761–1762, the crews of four Russian ships were massacred. This included one entire crew on Umnak which was completely wiped out. Russian traders responded with a scorched-earth campaign in 1764 that essentially ended the Aleuts' independence.

=== Modern history ===
The modern history of Umnak Island is linked to the military bases established by the United States during World War II. The purpose of the forward air bases in the Aleutian Islands was not only to defend the Dutch Harbor but also to launch attacks against the Japanese mainland.

On August 28, 1942, a USAAF B-17E bomber disappeared near Umnak Island, while returning from a bombing mission. The last radio contact from the crew stated that they had only one hour of fuel left. The entire crew of nine are officially listed as MIA, as no wreckage or remains were ever located.

The US Navy considered Umnak as exclusive and their own. They created a camouflage in the "Blair Fish Packing Co," to build airports and bases to be used by the US Army Air Force during World War II. After getting clearance from General John L. DeWitt, Simon Bolivar Buckner Jr. built airbases at Umnak (eventually known as Fort Glenn) and at Cold Bay. By the time the Japanese attacked in the summer of 1942, the US garrison at Umnak had a combined strength of 4000, including engineer companies complemented by infantry, as well as field and antiaircraft artillery units. The Japanese planned to attack and capture the island in June to maintain aerial patrols over North Pacific waters. Umnak was to be an outpost in a new area of dominance that would later include the Samoan and Fiji Islands and New Caledonia. The Japanese were unaware of the covert preparations being made by the United States as they believed that the island was only protected by a few ships operating in Aleutian waters.

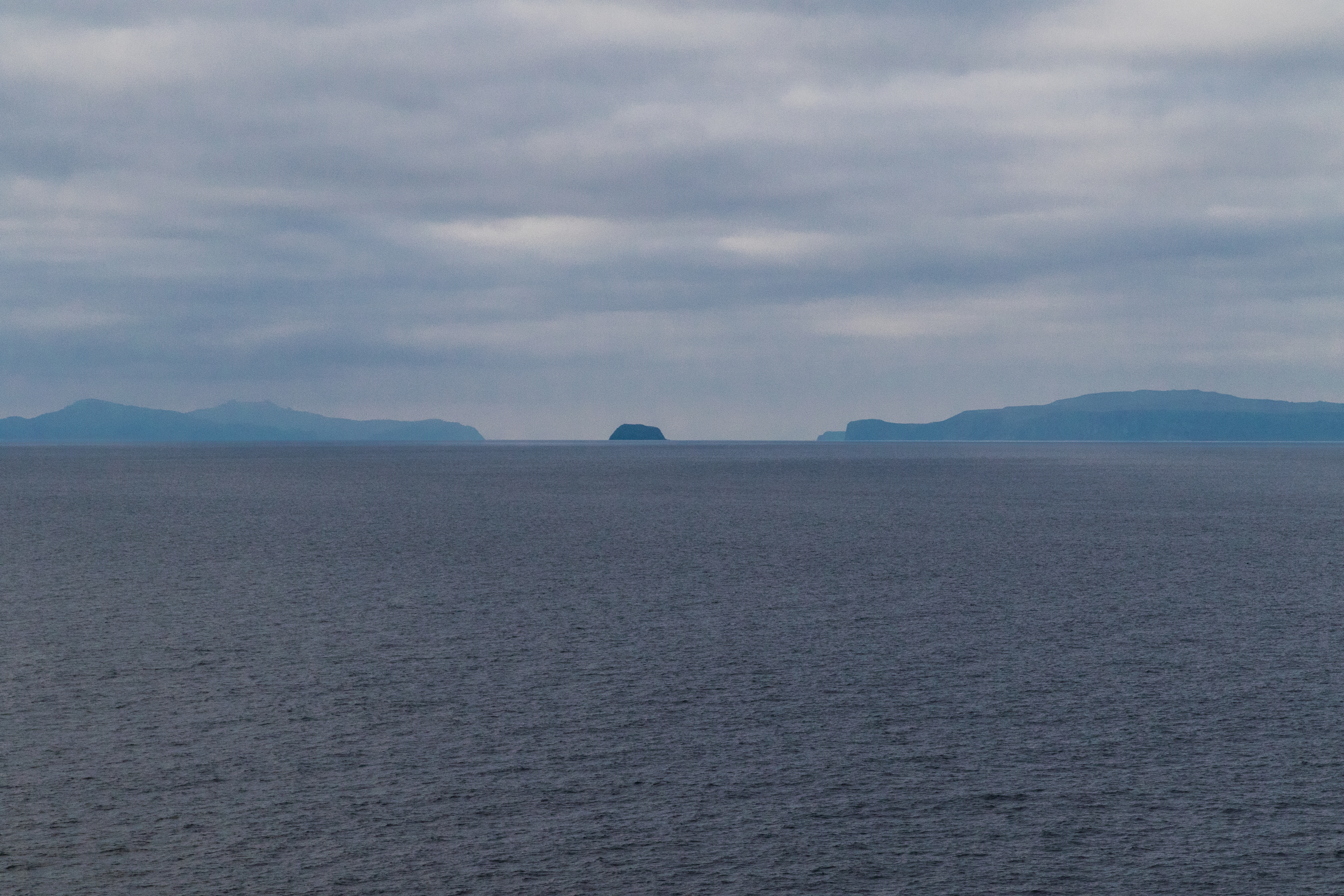
Umnak, Bogoslof, and Unalaska Islands as seen from the Bering Sea looking south. Unalaska Island is on the left, Bogoslof Island is in the center, and Umnak Island is on the right.

== Geography and climate ==
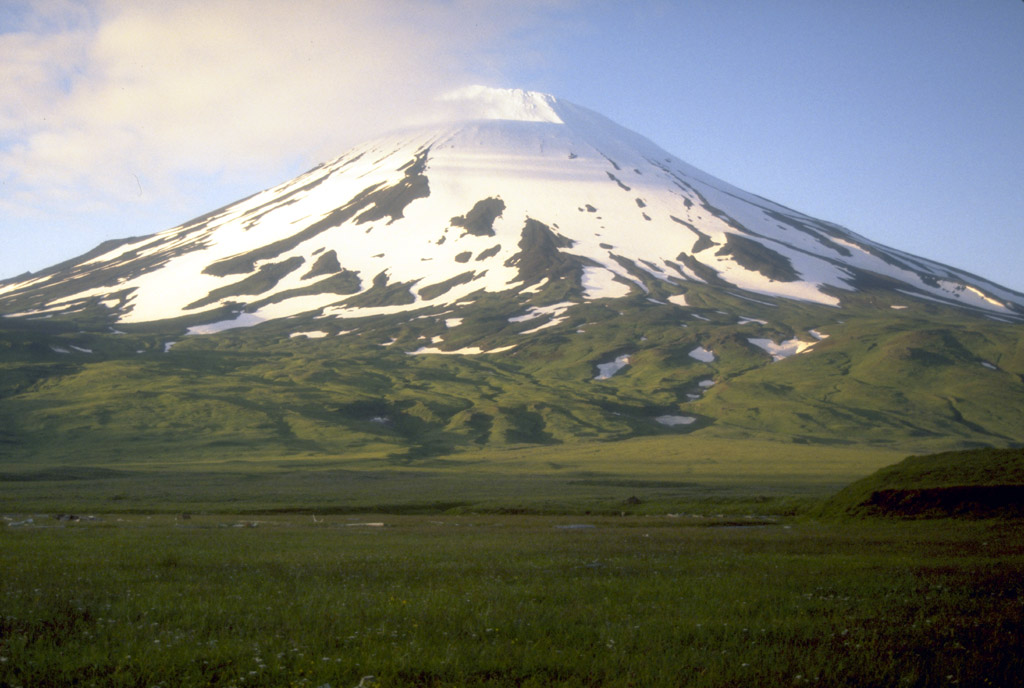
Highest point, Mount Vsevidof

Umnak, the third largest of the Aleutian Islands after Unimak and Unalaska, lies in the Fox Islands of the Aleutian Islands of the Bering Sea, to the southwest of the larger island of Unalaska. It is approximately 70–72 miles (113–116 km) in length (117 kilometres (73 mi)) and 16 miles (26 km) wide on average. The island was separated in the last glacial period and now lies about 300 kilometres (190 mi) from North American shores. It is an active volcanic island, with a land area of 1,793.2 km^{2} (692.4 mi^{2}) and with a coastline extending over 330.2 kilometres (205.2 mi). The elevation of the island is 2,132 metres (6,995 ft). The island is very mountainous with a low level of vegetation. The island does not have a harbor, although a sizeable bay is located in the western part of the island and contains the Adugak Island. The southern point of the island is known as Cape Sagak.

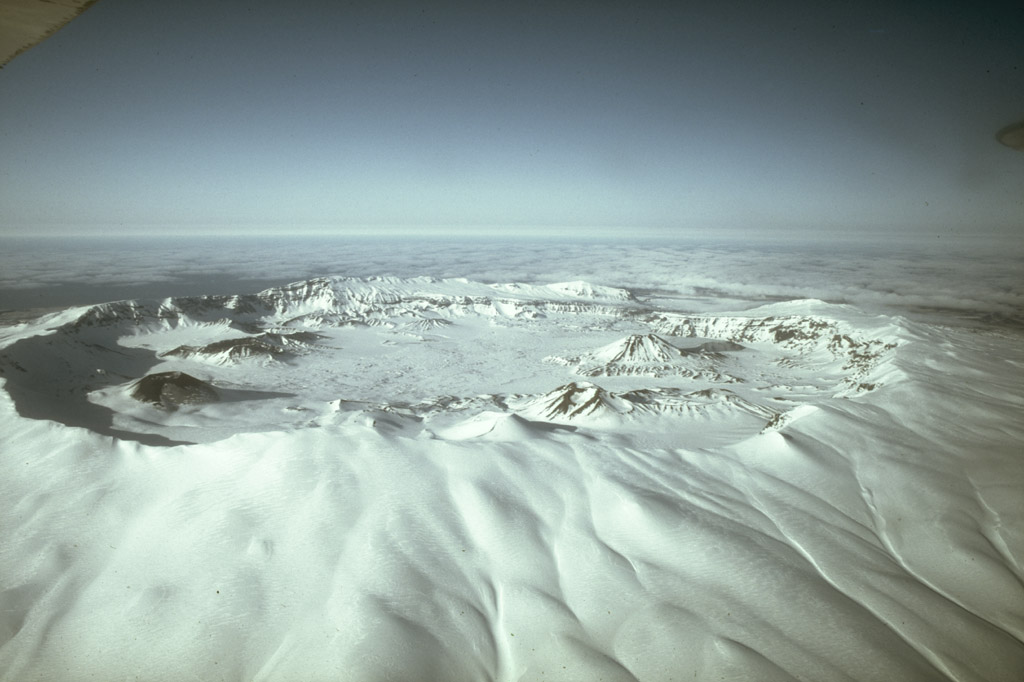
Okmok caldera on Umnak

The highest peak of the island, the Mount Vsevidof stratovolcano, is located in the southwestern part of the island. Its symmetrical cone rises abruptly from its surroundings and forms a 1.2-kilometre-wide (0.75 mi) crater at a height of 2,149 metres (7,051 ft). Its most recent eruption was caused by an earthquake on March 9, 1957. The mountain erupted on March 11, 1957, and the eruption ended the next day. To the east of Mount Vsevidof is the Russian Bay valley and another stratovolcano, Mount Recheshnoi which is also deeply dissected with a height of 1,984 metres (6,509 ft). In the southwest is the settlement of Nikolski further south and a lake, Umnak Lake, to its southeast which is just over 2 kilometres (1.2 mi) in length. The ancient settlement of Chaluka is located between this lake and Nikolski. This area is known as the Samalga Pass and was the center of ancient activity on the island and is located about 15 miles (24 km) off the southwestern tip of the island (Cape Sagak).

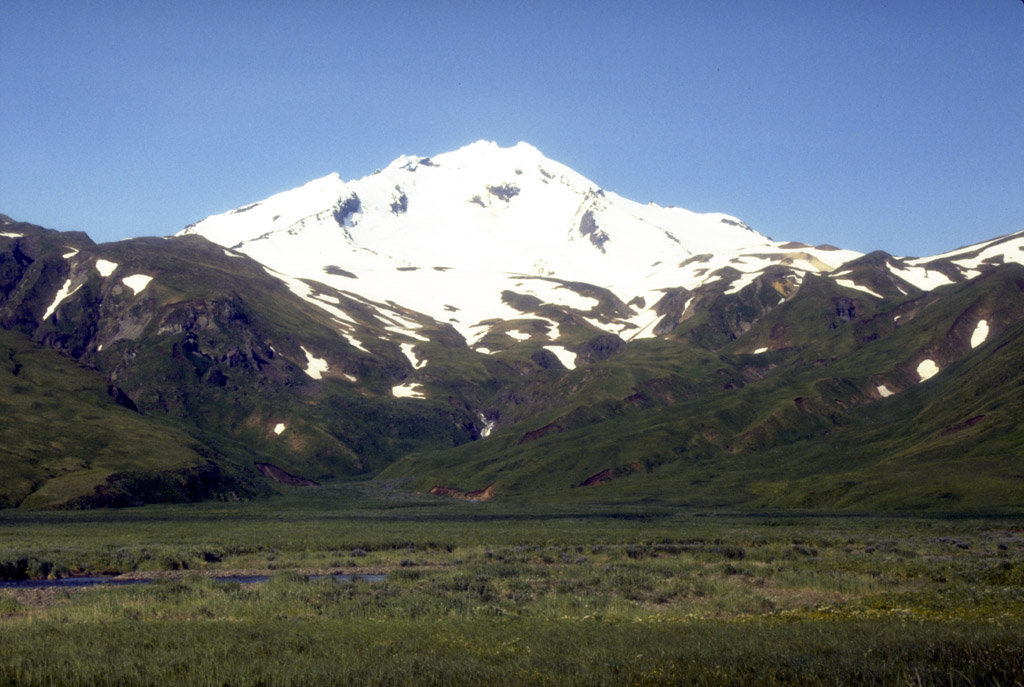
Mount Recheshnoi

The north-northeastern part of the island contains tholeiitic basaltic rocks and is characterized by tension faulting, lava flows, and fragmental deposits of igneous rocks. The volcano of Mount Okmok, characterized by its 5.8 miles (9.3 km) wide circular caldera, it located in the northwestern part of the island. This generally flat central basin has an average elevation of 370 m above sea level, with the rim of the caldera reaching a height of 1,073 metres (3,520 ft). Following the formation of the caldera, numerous satellite cones and lava domes have formed on the flanks of the volcano. They include Mount Tulik (1,253 metres (4,111 ft)) on the caldera's southeastern slope, Mount Idak (585 metres (1,919 ft)) to the northeast, and Jag Peak. A crater lake once filled much of the caldera to a depth of over 500 feet (150 m), but the lake ultimately drained through a notch eroded in the northeast rim. The prehistoric lake attained a maximum depth of about 150 metres (490 ft) and the upper surface reached an elevation of about 475 metres (1,558 ft), at which point it overtopped the low point of the caldera rim. Small, shallow remnants of the lake remained north of Cone D at an altitude of about 1,075 feet (328 m): a small shallow lake located between the caldera rim and Cone D; a smaller lake (named Cone B Lake) farther north near the caldera's gate. After the 2008 eruption, the hydrogeology of the caldera was greatly changed with five separate sizable lakes now emplaced. In addition to the caldera lakes, Cone A, Cone E, and Cone G and the new 2008 vent on Cone D contain small crater lakes. The volcano is currently rated by the Alaska Volcano Observatory as Aviation Alert Level Green and Volcanic-alert Level Normal.

To the north of Mount Recheshnoi, in the valley of Geyser Creek are located geothermal fields with geysers. In 1988 there were active 5 geysers up to 2 m high and 9 natural fountains up to 0.7 m high.

Umnak has a subarctic climate (Köppen: Dfc), which borders on a subpolar oceanic climate (Köppen: Cfc) with short, mild to warm summers and long, cold, snowy winters.

Climate data for Umnak, Alaska
Month	Jan	Feb	Mar	Apr	May	Jun	Jul	Aug	Sep	Oct	Nov	Dec	Year
Record high °F (°C)	46 (8)	49 (9)	46 (8)	50 (10)	59 (15)	64 (18)	70 (21)	74 (23)	64 (18)	60 (16)	55 (13)	46 (8)	74 (23)
Mean daily maximum °F (°C)	36.9 (2.7)	33.2 (0.7)	37.9 (3.3)	40.6 (4.8)	45.1 (7.3)	50.0 (10.0)	54.9 (12.7)	55.6 (13.1)	52.0 (11.1)	44.9 (7.2)	39.3 (4.1)	36.8 (2.7)	43.9 (6.6)
Daily mean °F (°C)	33.3 (0.7)	28.9 (−1.7)	33.8 (1.0)	36.2 (2.3)	40.3 (4.6)	45.2 (7.3)	49.4 (9.7)	50.1 (10.1)	45.9 (7.7)	39.9 (4.4)	35.2 (1.8)	32.4 (0.2)	39.2 (4.0)
Mean daily minimum °F (°C)	29.6 (−1.3)	24.6 (−4.1)	29.6 (−1.3)	31.8 (−0.1)	35.4 (1.9)	40.3 (4.6)	43.8 (6.6)	44.7 (7.1)	39.8 (4.3)	33.8 (1.0)	31.1 (−0.5)	27.9 (−2.3)	34.4 (1.3)
Record low °F (°C)	8 (−13)	10 (−12)	8 (−13)	18 (−8)	24 (−4)	30 (−1)	34 (1)	32 (0)	26 (−3)	18 (−8)	20 (−7)	16 (−9)	8 (−13)
Average precipitation inches (mm)	4.05 (103)	1.86 (47)	2.04 (52)	2.00 (51)	2.97 (75)	2.37 (60)	3.49 (89)	5.40 (137)	4.85 (123)	5.78 (147)	4.35 (110)	2.87 (73)	42.02 (1,067)
Average snowfall inches (cm)	5.2 (13)	12.0 (30)	10.3 (26)	4.9 (12)	1.7 (4.3)	0.0 (0.0)	0.0 (0.0)	0.0 (0.0)	0.1 (0.25)	2.9 (7.4)	6.1 (15)	9.6 (24)	52.8 (134)
Source: WRCC

== Eruptions ==
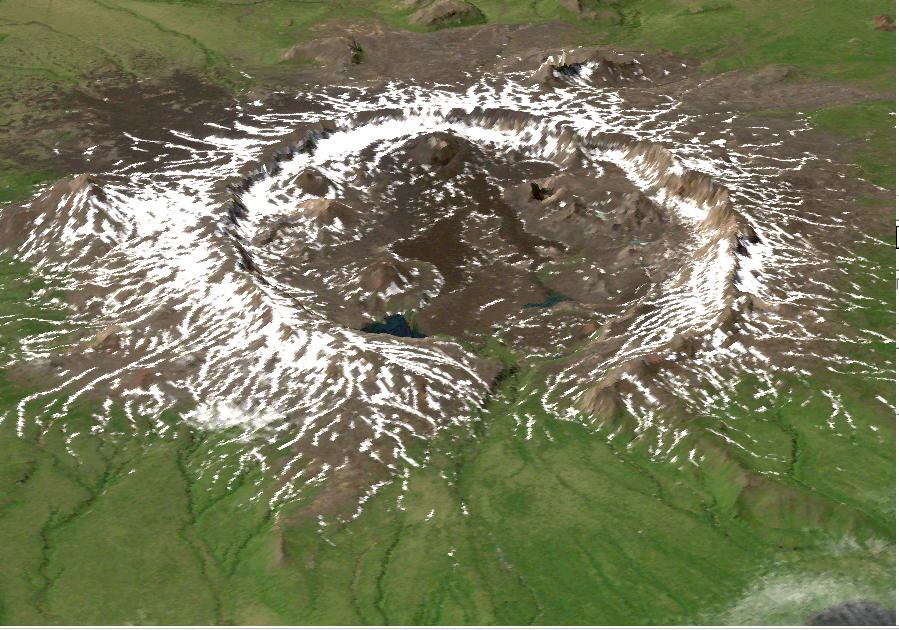
Okmok Volcano

On Saturday, July 12, 2008, Okmok Volcano on Mount Okmok, located on Umnak, erupted for several days, through a fresh vent sending wet, ash, and gas-rich plume that reached an altitude of 50,000 feet (15,000 m) in the air and forcing the evacuation of Fort Glenn, a private cattle ranch located on the island. Ash fell not only on the eastern part of the island but also on a fishing village 65 miles (105 km) on the northeast. However, the Aleut village, Nikolski, on the opposite side of Umnak Island with a population of about 40 people to the west of Okmok Volcano escaped from the southeasterly path of the ash clouds. The ash plume also disrupted the operation of flights to the Dutch Harbor airport as it spread across many miles of the North Pacific.

Okmok Caldera itself had been formed and reshaped in two major eruptions which occurred 12,000 and 2,000 years ago. Direct observations of later volcanic activity are known since 1805, with 16 eruptions recorded every 10 to 20 years. The 1817 eruption deposited several feet of ash and "scoria" rock debris on the northeastern caldera rim, with ash falling on Unalaska Island. Floods that occurred during this destroyed an Aleut village at Cape Tanak on the northeast Bering Sea Coast of the island. In the recent 1997 eruption, the ash clouds traveled 6 miles (9.7 km) across the volcano's caldera floor.

== Demographics ==
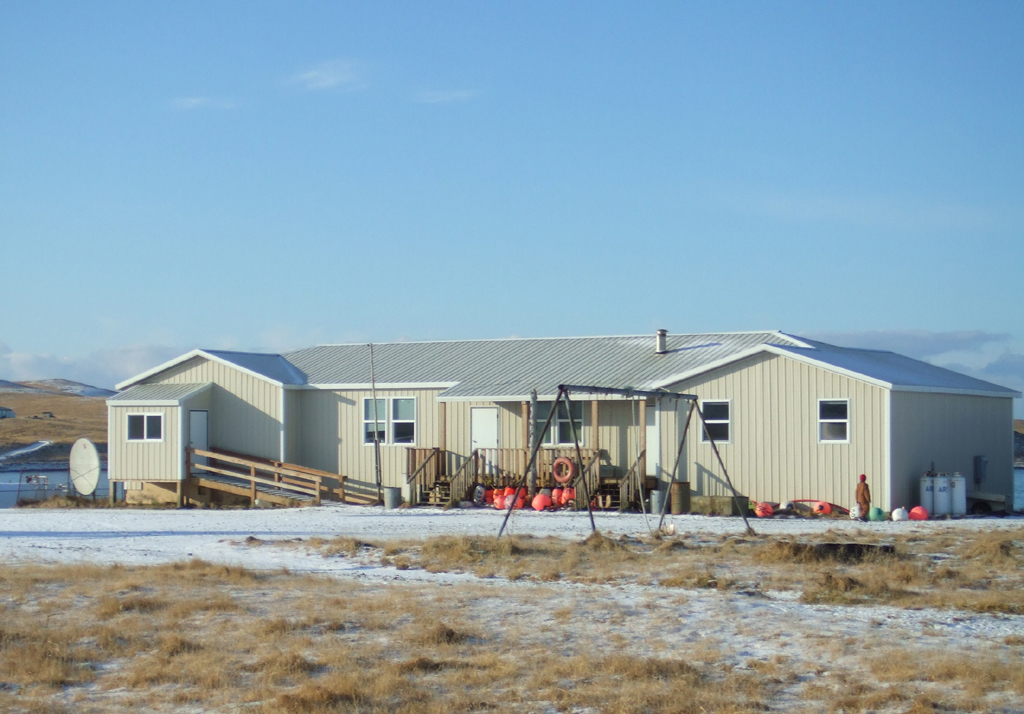
Nikolski School Building

In 1941, when the island was being used as a military base by the United States, the population of the province consisted of only 50 Aleutians. As of the 2000 census, the island's population further declined to 39 persons. Its only remaining community, Nikolski, comprised the island's entire population. Fort Glenn, a former major military facility on the northeast shore of the island, played an instrumental role in the North Pacific Theater in World War II.

As of the census of 2000, there were 15 households and 12 families residing on the island. The population density was 0.3 inhabitants per square mile (0.1/km^{2}). There were 28 housing units at an average density of 0.2 per square mile (0.08/km^{2}). The racial makeup of was 30.77% White and 69.23% Native American.

There were 15 households, out of which 40.0% had children under the age of 18 living with them, 53.3% were married couples living together, 20.0% had a female householder with no husband present, and 20.0% were non-families. 20.0% of all households were made up of individuals, and none had someone living alone who was 65 years of age or older. The average household size was 2.60 and the average family size was 2.92.

In 2000, the median age was 40 years, with 35.9% under the age of 18, 30.8% from 25 to 44, 23.1% from 45 to 64, and 10.3% who were 65 years of age or older. For every 100 females there were 105.3 males. For every 100 females of age 18 and over, there were 92.3 males.

The median income for a household was $38,750, and the median income for a family was $40,250. Males had a median income of $26,250 versus $11,875 for females. The per capita income was $14,083. There were 23.5% of families and 20.7% of the population living below the poverty line, including 13.6% of under eighteens and 55.6% of those over 64.

== Education ==
The only school on the island is in Nikolski, part of the Aleutian Region Schools. The Nikolski School serves grades K-12. Schools in rural Alaska must have at least 10 students to retain funding from the state. For the 2009–2010 school year, the Nikolski School had only nine students including a Samoan family who subsequently relocated, and was closed in 2010. The school reopened in 2024.

== Transport ==
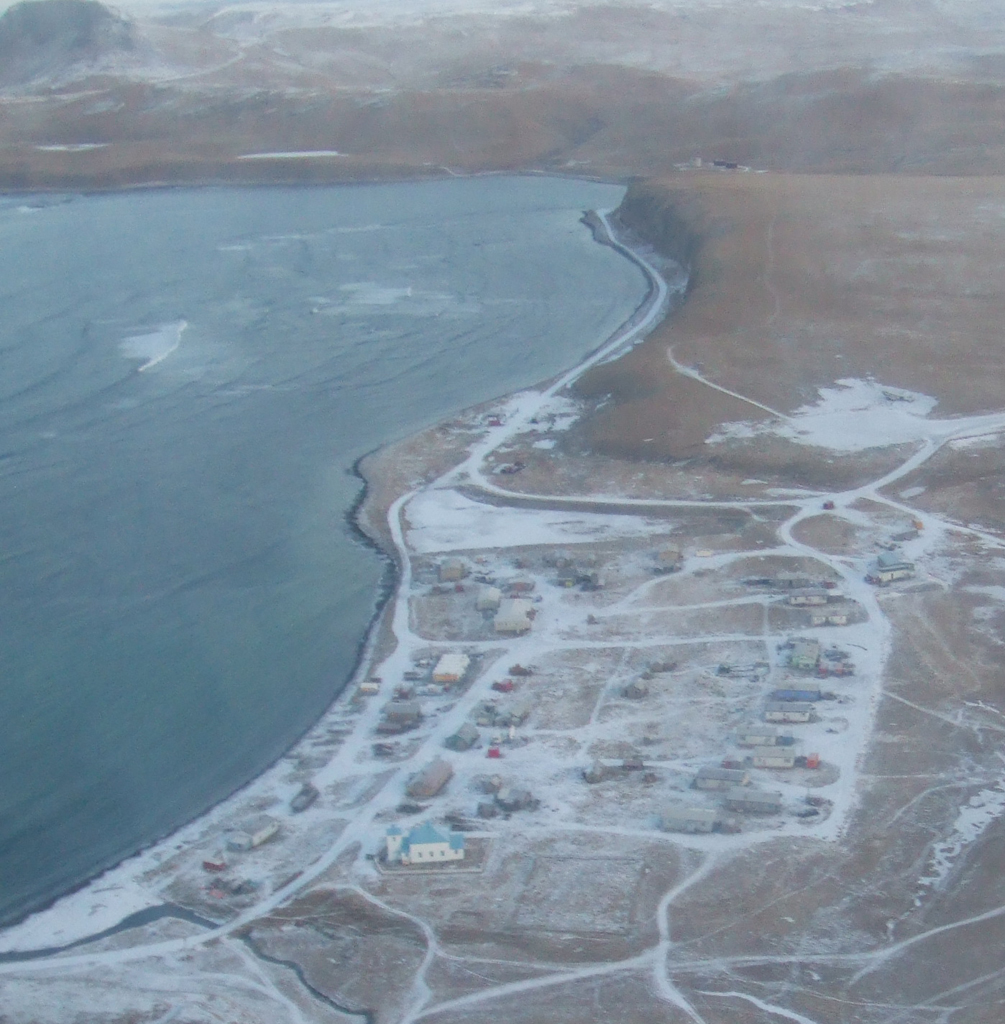
Nikolski

Umnak does not have a harbor. It does, however, have an airstrip, Nikolski Airport. Building an airport runway in the hilly terrain was a unique engineering achievement of the Army Engineers, commanded by Colonel Benjamin B. Talley. The construction work of the runway was proposed at Otter Point on the northeastern end of Umnak. Construction was started in the middle of January 1942 and was commissioned by April of the same year, being given the name Fort Glenn. Three hundred thousand square feet (28,000 square metres) of Marston Matting, a perforated-steel plating (PSP), was assembled along with other steel plates and created a flat surface for aircraft to take off and land. The runway was completed on March 31, 1942, by the 807th Unit of the Army Engineers. It was 3,000 feet (910 m) long with a width of 100 feet (30 m) sufficient for Capt. John S. Chennault's P-40 fighter aircraft in the 11th Fighter Squadron to land.

The Naval Air Facility Otter Point was built next to Fort Glenn.

After the war ended, Fort Glenn remained open as a refueling stop for transient aircraft in the Aleutians along with Military Air Transport Service flights using the Great Circle Route from Japan to the United States. The main runway was extended to 8,300 feet long to accommodate large, long-range aircraft. By 1946, the base maintained only a skeleton staff due to the rapid demobilization of the Army Air Forces. The last AAF personnel were withdrawn by 30 September 1947, and the base was put on inactive status and was effectively abandoned. It was decommissioned in 1950 and the site was excessed between 1952–55 to the Bureau of Land Management. Many years later the airfield was added to the National Register of Historic Places as Cape Field at Fort Glenn. Some distance away, Nikolski is still served by a gravel airstrip.

== See also ==
- Mount Vsevidof, the highest point of Umnak
- Umnak Airport
