= Nikolski, Alaska =

Nikolski Chalukax̂
- CDP
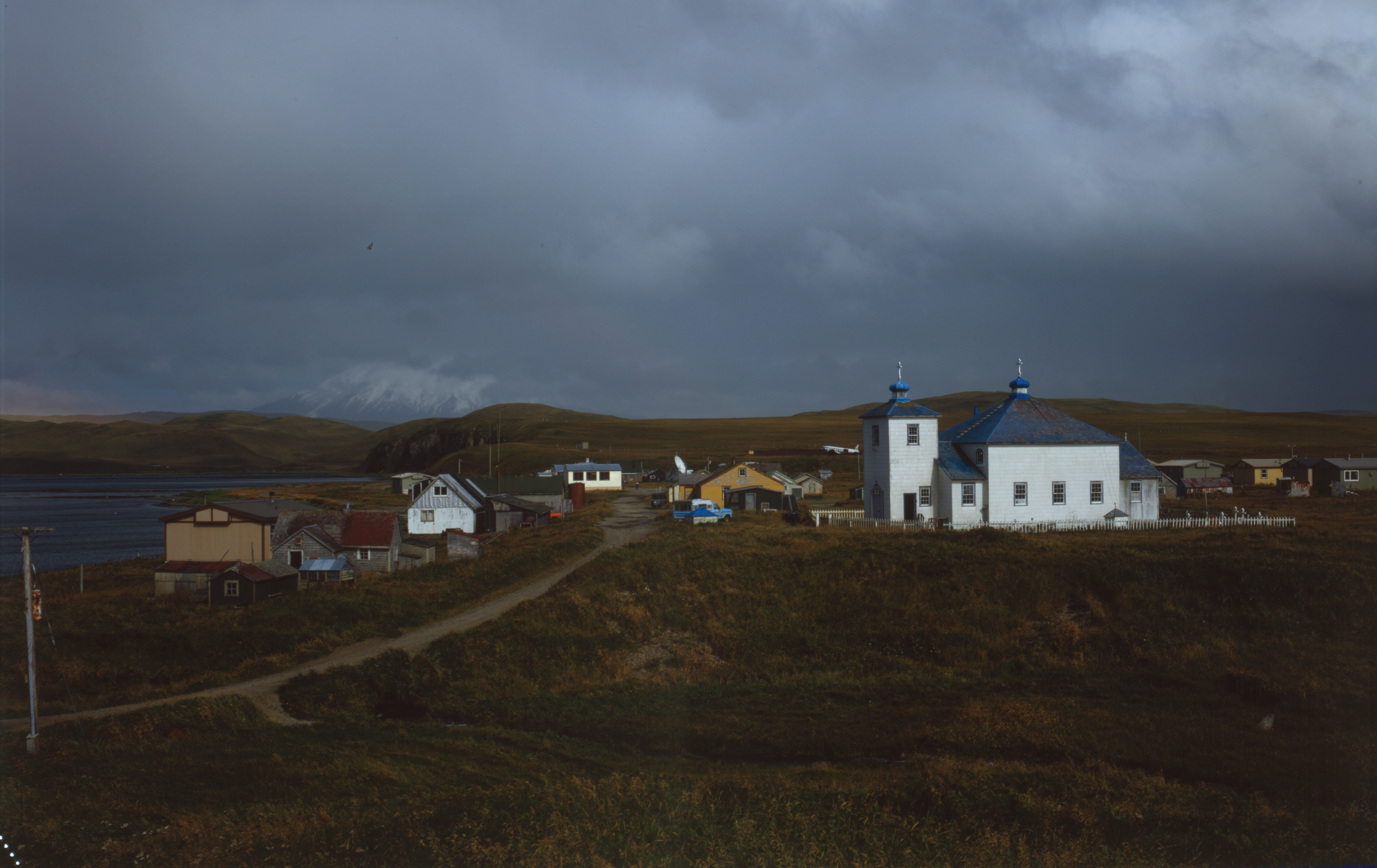
- Houses and the St. Nicholas Russian Orthodox Church in Nikolski

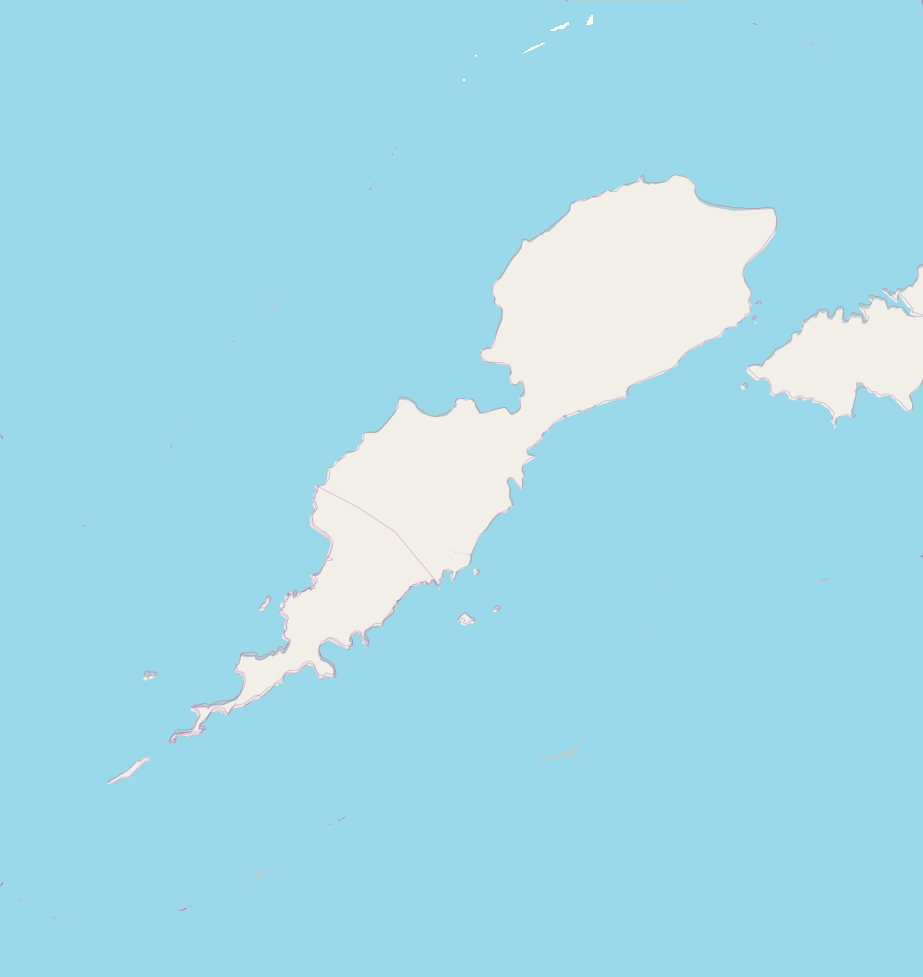
- Location within Umnak Location within Alaska
- Coordinates: 52°56′29″N 168°51′39″W
- Country: United States
- State: Alaska
- Census Area: Aleutians West

Government
  - State senator: Lyman Hoffman (D)
  - State rep.: Bryce Edgmon (I)

Area
  - Total: 132.78 sq mi (343.91 km^{2})
  - Land: 132.05 sq mi (342.01 km^{2})
  - Water: 0.73 sq mi (1.90 km^{2})

Population (2020)
  - Total: 39
  - Density: 0.28/sq mi (0.11/km^{2})
- Time zone: UTC−9 (Alaska Standard (AKST))
  - Summer (DST): UTC−8 (Alaska Daylight (AKDT))
- ZIP code: 99638
- Area code: 907
- FIPS code: 02-54260

Nikolski (Aleut: Chalukax̂; Russian: Никольский) is a census-designated place (CDP) on Umnak Island in Aleutians West Census Area, Alaska, United States. The population was 39 at the 2020 census, up from 18 in 2010. Nikolski is on Nikolski Bay, off the southwest end of the island. It is 116 air miles west of Unalaska, and 800 nautical miles from Anchorage. Residents are known as Unangan, and Aleut is spoken in most of the remaining homes.

== History ==
The Aleutian Pribilof Islands Association reports that Nikolski is thought to be one of the oldest continuously occupied communities in the world. Archaeological evidence from Ananiuliak Island, 5 km offshore in Nikolski Bay, dates human habitation to 8,500 years ago. A site known as Chaluka in Nikolski shows 4,000 years of virtually continuous occupation. Subsistence activities, sheep and cattle raising, and fishing are the main livelihoods and the latter has been traced back thousands of years by archaeologists, through analysis of midden sites and fish hook designs in the 1960s. Previous activities from the 1800s included sea otter hunting and fox farming. A sheep ranch was established in 1926 as part of the Aleutian Livestock Company and there are thousands on the island today. In the early 1900s the residents purchased a large fishing boat with money made from those activities, the “Umnak Native”, but it was wrecked in 1933.

In June 1942 during World War II, the Japanese attacked Unalaska to the East and had also seized Attu and Kiska islands, to the west. Residents of Umnak Island were evacuated to the Ketchikan area in far southeastern Alaska, although an American airstrip and military base on the north of the island, Fort Glenn Army Air Base (abandoned by 1950) repelled Japanese forces. The Battle of Attu and associated campaigns in 1943 recaptured the lost islands to the west. Nikolski locals returned in 1944, but some had experienced the outside world for the first time and since then, many Native people have remained offshore, working in canneries or on fishing vessels. The US Air Force built a White Alice radar communication site on the edge of town in the 1950s, but it was abandoned by 1977. A 3,500-foot gravel runway, the unattended Nikolski Air Station remains, and there are passenger, mail and cargo services depending on the harsh weather conditions. Nikolski has no harbour.

== Geography ==
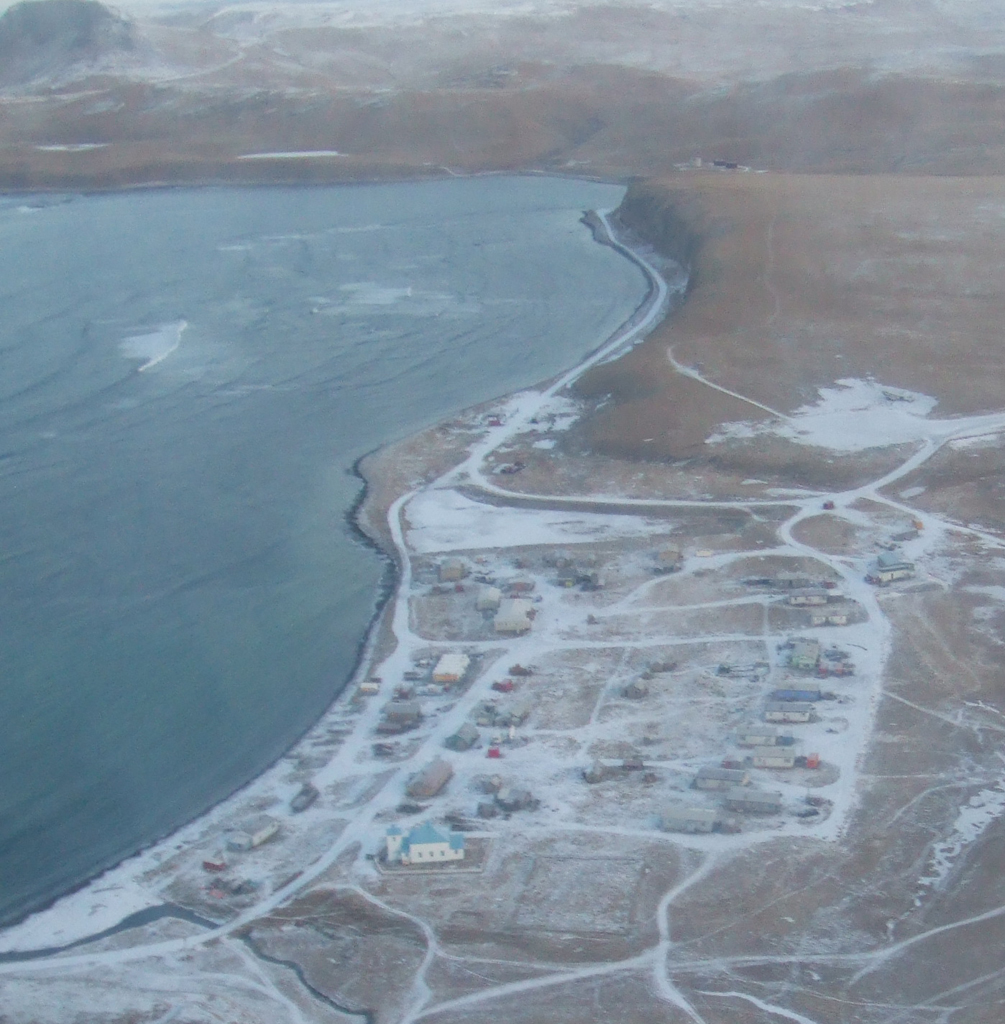
Aerial photo of Nikolski

Nikolski is located at 52°56′29″N 168°51′39″W.

According to the U.S. Census Bureau, the CDP has a total area of 132.8 square miles (344 km^{2}), of which, 132.1 square miles (342 km^{2}) of it is land and 0.7 square miles (1.8 km^{2}) of it (0.55%) is water. The island is in the maritime climate zone. Temperatures range from 11 degrees F (−11 C) to 65 degrees (18 C). Snowfall is considerable and covers Mount Vsevidof and other peaks, with rain and strong winds much of the year, and summer fog.

On a clear day the view from Nikolski is dominated by Mount Vsevidof to the northeast, the highest point on Umnak Island (7,051 ft; 2,149 m). Vsevidof is tectonically active, and an eruption last occurred on March 11, 1957, following an earthquake. A cataclysmic eruption of Mount Okmok in the northernmost part of the island severely affected Nikolski residents in July 2008.

The boundary between the Alaska Time Zone (UTC−9) and Hawaii–Aleutian Time Zone (UTC−10) passes just west of Nikolski, along the line of 169°30'W through Samalga Pass. This places Nikolski in the Alaska Time Zone. However, as Nikolski is part of the Aleutian Region School District, the settlement effectively observes Hawaii–Aleutian time.

== Demographics ==
Historical population
Census	Pop.	Note	%±
1880	127		—
1890	94		−26.0%
1920	83		—
1930	109		31.3%
1940	97		−11.0%
1950	64		−34.0%
1960	92		43.8%
1970	57		−38.0%
1980	50		−12.3%
1990	35		−30.0%
2000	39		11.4%
2010	18		−53.8%
2020	39		116.7%
U.S. Decennial Census

Nikolski first appeared on the 1880 U.S. Census as the unincorporated Aleut village of "Nikolsky." It had 127 residents, of whom 117 were Aleut, 8 were Creole (Mixed Russian & Native) and 2 were White. In 1890, it returned as "Umnak", with 94 residents, of whom 80 were Native and 14 were Creole. It did not appear again until 1920, when it again reported as "Umnak." Beginning with the 1930 census and to date, it has reported as Nikolski. It was made a census-designated place (CDP) in 1980.

As of the census of 2000, there were 39 people, 15 households, and 12 families residing in the CDP. The population density was 0.3 inhabitants per square mile (0.12/km^{2}). There were 28 housing units at an average density of 0.2 units per square mile (0.077 units/km^{2}). The racial makeup of the CDP was 30.77% White and 69.23% Native American.

Of the 15 households, 40.0% had children under the age of 18 living with them, 53.3% were married couples living together, 20.0% had a female householder with no husband present, and 20.0% were non-families. 20.0% of all households were made up of individuals, and none had someone living alone who was 65 years of age or older. The average household size was 2.60 and the average family size was 2.92.

In the CDP, the population was spread out, with 35.9% under the age of 18, 30.8% from 25 to 44, 23.1% from 45 to 64, and 10.3% who were 65 years of age or older. The median age was 40 years. For every 100 females, there were 105.3 males. For every 100 females age 18 and over, there were 92.3 males.

The median income for a household in the CDP was $38,750, and the median income for a family was $40,250. Males had a median income of $26,250 versus $11,875 for females. The per capita income for the CDP was $14,083. There were 23.5% of families and 20.7% of the population living below the poverty line, including 13.6% of under eighteens and 55.6% of those over 64.

== Education ==
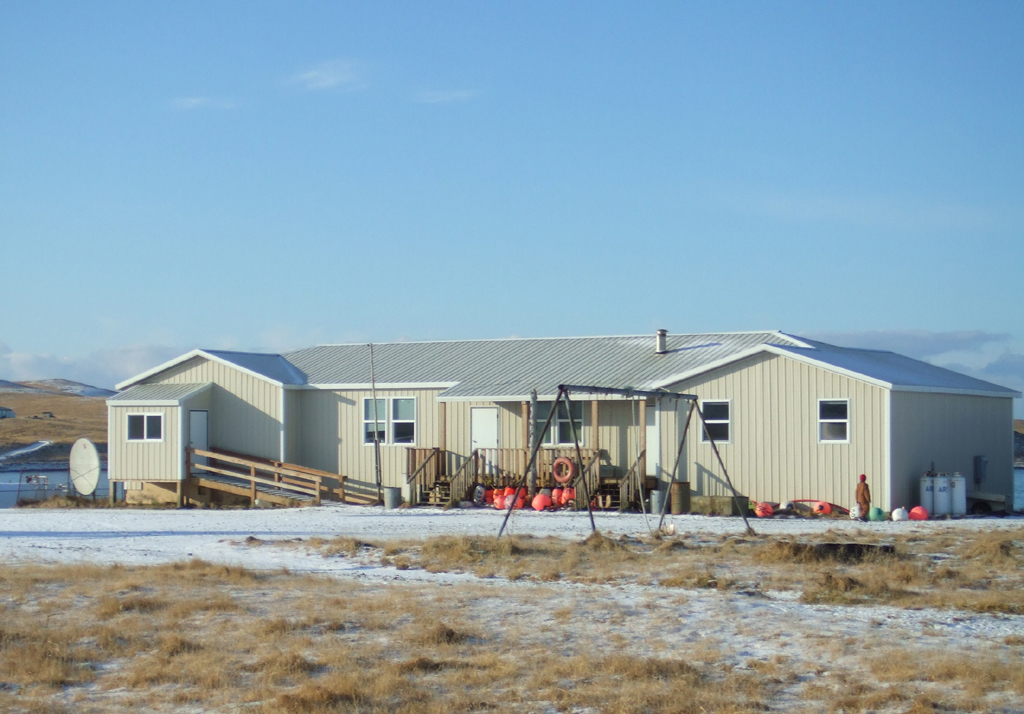
Nikolski School

Nikolski is served by the Aleutian Region Schools.

The Nikolski School serves grades K–12. The school had one live-in teacher that occupied a small home owned by the school district adjacent to the school building and purpose-built for teachers and their family. The school was constructed in 1939 by the Bureau of Indian Affairs. Circa 1978, the school had a single teacher, and 15 students. In 2008, the number of students fell below 9. Beginning in 1998, schools in rural Alaska had to have at least 10 students, in order to retain funding from the state, and campuses not meeting the number had to close. The school district used its budget to keep the school open. An American Samoan family arrived, but as the school lost more students, that family did not have enough children to enroll to make up the required 10 students and, subsequently, the family moved away. A student living elsewhere was offered to relocate to Nikolski, where he would be the 10th student, but he chose not to, partly because the Nikolski School could not offer welding classes, and thus the school could not reach the 10 student threshold. The school closed down after the conclusion of the 2009–2010 school year. The permanent teacher left during the fall semester, so a volunteer had to fill in for the rest of the school year. After it closed down, some of the students left the village, while others were home schooled. The school reopened in 2024.

== Media ==
An episode of angler and TV presenter Jeremy Wade's Dark Waters (2019) was partially filmed in Nikolski. He failed to catch elusive large halibut offshore, and was stranded due to bad weather for several days.

== See also ==
- Nikolski Air Station
