= Seal Island Historic District =

Archaeological site in Alaska, United States

- U.S. National Register of Historic Places
- U.S. National Historic Landmark District
- Alaska Heritage Resources Survey
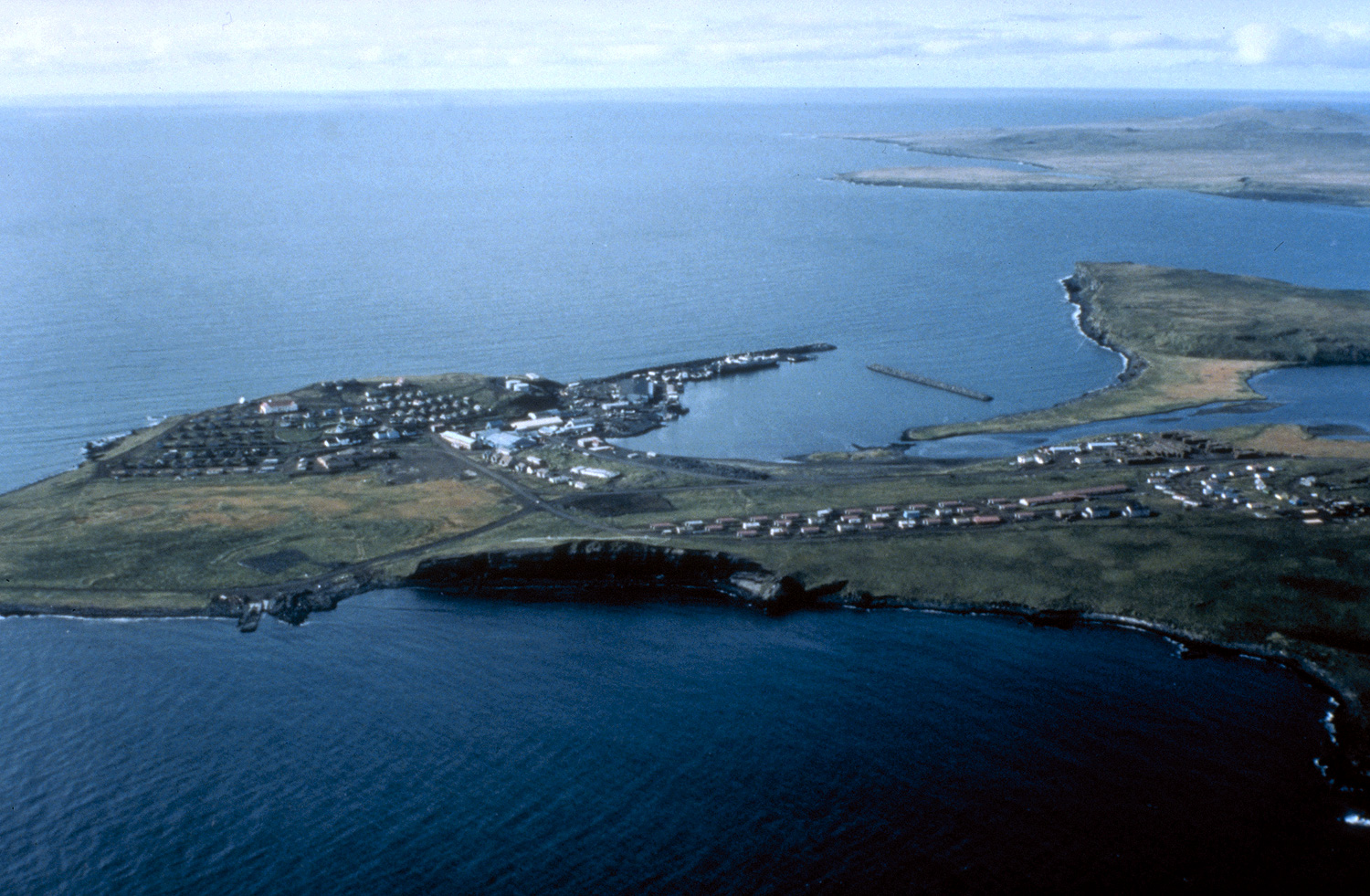
- St Paul Island

- Location within Alaska
- Location: Pribilof Islands, Alaska
- Coordinates: 56°54′28″N 170°2′26″W
- Area: 6,970 acres (2,820 ha)
- NRHP reference No.: 66000156
- AHRS No.: XPI-016, XPI-007, XPI-015, XPI-006, XPI-009, XPI-008, XPI-011

Significant dates
- Added to NRHP: October 15, 1966
- Designated NHLD: June 13, 1962

The Seal Island Historic District is a National Historic Landmark District located on the islands of St. George and St. Paul in the Pribilof Islands in the Bering Sea of Alaska. These islands are home to northern fur seal herds which were actively hunted by indigenous populations and later by many nationalities. These islands of the Pribilofs are also the southern end of the range of the polar bear. The North Pacific Fur Seal Convention of 1911 signed by the United Kingdom, Japan, Russia and the United States limited hunting of the seals on these islands; this international treaty was one of the first conservation treaties, and set the stage for subsequent treaties.

== History ==
The Pribilof Islands were discovered by Russian fur hunters in 1786, and in the following years a number of small villages for hunting and processing seals were established, including ones at the sites of the present-day St. George and St. Paul. After the Russian American Company was granted an exclusive monopoly on fur in the area, these villages were largely consolidated. The Company continued to exploit the seal population until the area was sold to the United States in 1867. The area was then administered by the United States government, with leases authorizing private companies to exploit the herd. By the early 20th century, the seal population had fallen dramatically, from an estimated millions to under 300,000. Due to the lucrative nature of the industry, the Kingdoms of Russia, Japan, United Kingdom, and the United States agreed to a moratorium on seal fishing in the North Pacific Fur Seal Convention of 1911.

The seal population had significantly recovered by the 1920s, and was around 1.5 million in 1952. The Convention expired in 1985, bringing an effective end to the seal hunting industry. The area is now part of the Alaska Maritime National Wildlife Refuge, and the herd is generally subject only to subsistence hunting by the native Aleut population. Although no longer commercially hunted, the seal population has been decreasing recently, possibly due to huge amounts of debris that has washed up on the islands.

== Landmark areas ==
Three areas of Saint Paul and Saint George were designated a National Historic Landmark District in 1962, and listed on the National Register of Historic Places in 1966. On Saint George, the district includes a strip of land on the north shore, encompassing historic elements of the city of St. George, and extending east to a rookery and historic kill site area. On Saint Paul, the historic portion of the main city is included in the district, as is most of the northeastern triangular peninsula ending at North Point, where major rookeries are located. About 10% of the land area of Saint Paul Island is included in the district. In both cities, historic structures include industrial processing facilities as well as worker housing. The Russian Orthodox churches in the two communities, Sts. Peter and Paul Church in St. Paul and St. George the Great Martyr Orthodox Church in St. George, also contribute to the area's historic significance and are separately listed on the National Register. The rookery area on St. George includes the remains of one of the early Russian-built villages, Staraya Atil. On Saint Paul the district includes nine separate rookery areas and five historic village sites.

== See also ==
- List of National Historic Landmarks in Alaska
- National Register of Historic Places listings in Aleutians West Census Area, Alaska
