= St. Paul Airport =

St. Paul Airport may refer to:

- St. Paul Aerodrome in St. Paul, Alberta, Canada (IATA: ZSP)
- St. Paul Downtown Airport in Saint Paul, Minnesota, United States (IATA: STP)
- St. Paul Island Airport on St. Paul Island, Alaska, United States (IATA: SNP)
- Minneapolis-Saint Paul International Airport in Minneapolis-Saint Paul, Minnesota, United States (IATA: MSP)
- Ohrid "St. Paul the Apostle" Airport in Ohrid, Republic of Macedonia (IATA: OHD)
