= Gavriil Pribylov =

Russian navigator and explorer (died 1796)

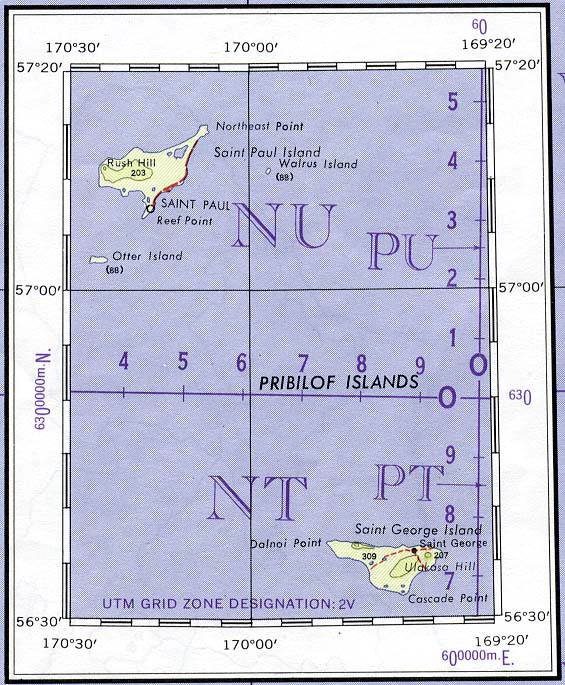
Pribylov discovered the islands of St. George and St. Paul in 1786–87; they and surrounding small islets were later named after him.

Gavriil Loginovich Pribylov (Note: First name also spelled Gavriel, Gerasim or Gerassim, last name also spelled Pribilof.) (Russian: Гаврии́л Ло́гинович Прибыло́в; died 1796) was a Russian navigator who discovered the Bering Sea islands of St. George Island and St. Paul Island in 1786 and 1787. The islands, and surrounding small islets, now bear his name, being known as the Pribilof Islands.

== Career ==
Pribylov was commander of the Russian American Company ship St. George (Sv. Georgii Pobedonosets), a sloop or galiot, when he discovered St. George Island on June 25, 1786, by following the sounds of barking northern fur seals. Pribylov's discovery successfully ended an active three-year search for the lucrative breeding grounds of fur seals by Siberian merchants. His expedition was funded jointly by Grigory Shelikhov and Pavel Lebedev-Lastochkin. Shelikhov controlled a monopoly on Aleutian fur-trading activities granted by Empress Catherine II of Russia, but often took on partners to help fund his activities; the two men would later become rivals.

More than 20 of Pribylov's crew, which was of mixed Russian and Aleut descent, were left on St. George Island to hunt the seals. Both Russians and Aleuts stayed behind for the hunt. This played a key role in establishing the international hunting of northern fur seals, which continued in various forms until banned by international treaty in 1911, after nearly forcing the seals to extinction.

A year later in 1787, Pribylov discovered St. Paul Island, approximately 50 miles to the north of St. George.

In truth, Pribylov did not actually discover the islands, as he was directed to their approximate location by the son of an Aleut chief. The then-uninhabited islands, known to the Aleuts as Amiq, were a fabled hunting ground in Aleut oral tradition.
