= St. Paul, Alaska =

St. Paul Tanax̂ Amix̂ (Aleut) Sanpuulax̂ (Aleut)
- City
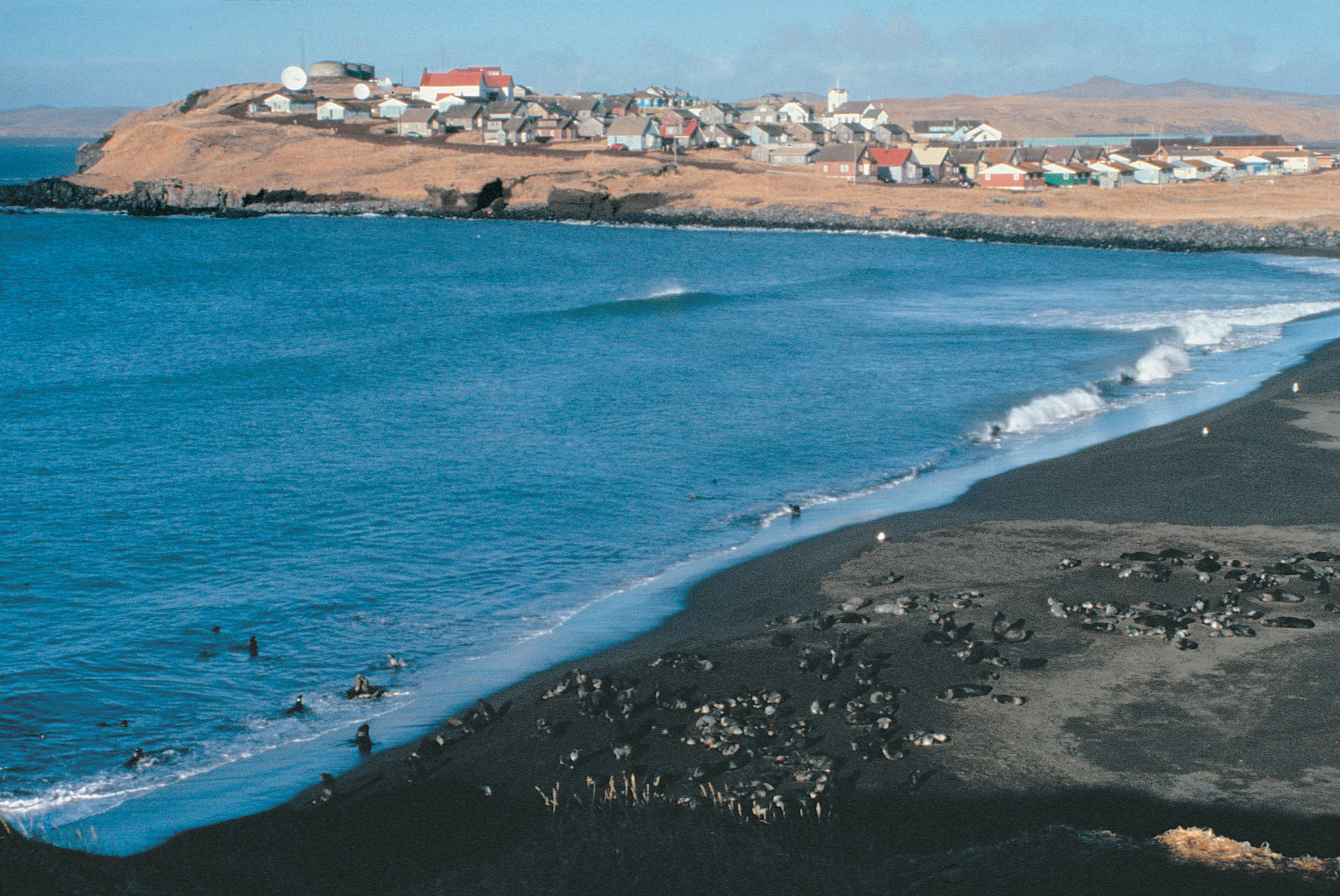
- St. Paul, Alaska

- Location in Alaska
- Coordinates: 57°7′30″N 170°17′3″W
- Country: United States
- State: Alaska
- Census Area: Aleutians West
- Founded: 1943
- Incorporated: June 29, 1971

Government
  - Mayor: Joseph Kozloff
  - State senator: Lyman Hoffman (D)
  - State rep.: Bryce Edgmon (I)

Area
  - Total: 295.46 sq mi (765.25 km^{2})
  - Land: 42.62 sq mi (110.39 km^{2})
  - Water: 252.84 sq mi (654.86 km^{2})
- Elevation: 23 ft (7 m)

Population (2020)
  - Total: 413
  - Density: 9.7/sq mi (3.74/km^{2})
- Time zone: UTC-9 (Alaskan (AKST))
  - Summer (DST): UTC-8 (AKDT)
- ZIP code: 99660
- Area code: 907
- FIPS code: 02-66470
- GNIS feature ID: 1419163

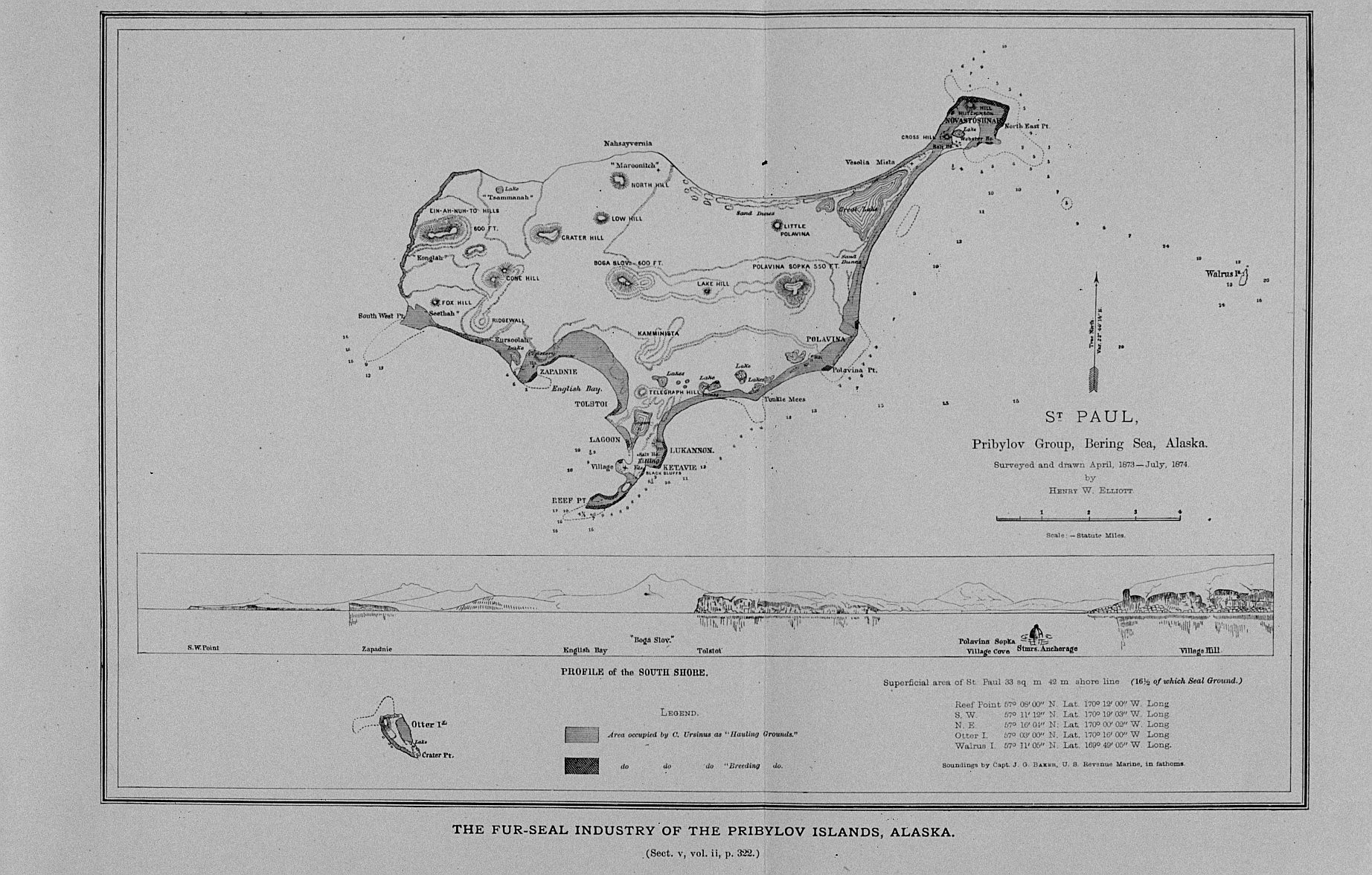
Survey map and elevation profile of Saint Paul Island, with surrounding ocean soundings

St. Paul (Aleut: Tanax̂ Amix̂ or Sanpuulax̂, Russian: Сент-Пол, romanized: Sent-Pol) is a city in the Aleutians West Census Area, Alaska, United States. It is the main settlement of Saint Paul Island in the Pribilof Islands, an archipelago in the Bering Sea. The population was 413 at the 2020 census, down from 479 in 2010.

The three closest islands to Saint Paul Island are Otter Island to the southwest, Saint George slightly to the south, and Walrus Island to the east.

St. Paul Island's land area is 43 sq mi (110 km^{2}). In 2008, it had one school with 76 students, one post office, one bar, one small store, and one church (the Russian Orthodox Sts. Peter and Paul Church), which is listed on the U.S. National Register of Historic Places.

The island was one of the last places where woolly mammoths survived, until around 5,600 years ago.

== Geography and geology ==
Saint Paul is the largest of the Pribilof Islands and lies the farthest north. With a width of 7.66 mi (12.33 km) at its widest point and a length of 13.5 mi (21.7 km) on its longest axis (which runs from northeast to southwest), it has a total area of 43 mi^{2} (110 km^{2}). Volcanic in origin, Saint Paul features a number of cinder cones and volcanic craters in its interior. The highest of these, Rush Hill, rises to 665 ft (203 m) on the island's western shore, though most of the upland areas average less than 150 ft (46 m) in elevation. Most of the island is a low-lying mix of rocky plateaus and valleys, with some of the valleys holding freshwater ponds. Much of its 45.5 mi (73.2 km) of shoreline is rugged and rocky, rising to sheer cliffs at several headlands, though long sandy beaches backed by shifting sand dunes flank a number of shallow bays.

Like the other Pribilof Islands, Saint Paul rises from a basaltic base. Its hills are primarily brown or red tufa and cinder heaps, though some (like Polavina) are composed of red scoria and breccia. The island sits on the southern edge of the Bering-Chukchi platform, and may have been part of the Bering Land Bridge's southern coastline when the last ice age's glaciers reached their maximum expansion. Sediment core samples taken on Saint Paul show that tundra vegetation similar to that found on the island today has been present for at least 9,000 years. The thick rough turf is dominated by umbellifers (particularly Angelica) and Artemisia, though grasses and sedges are also abundant.

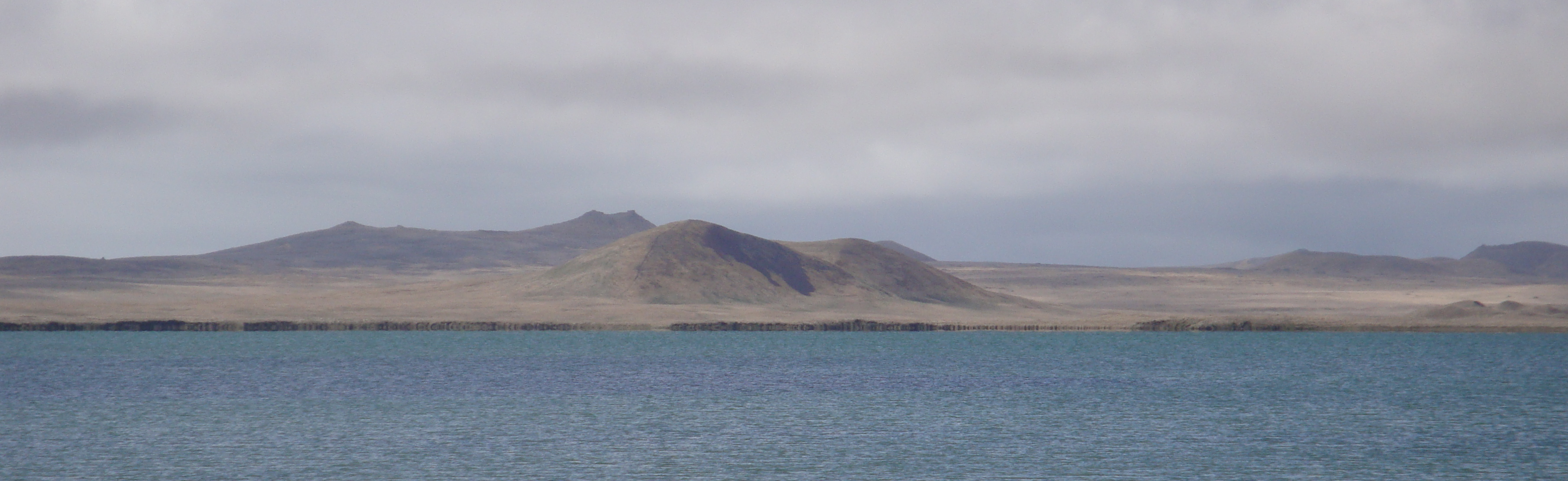
The generally low-lying island of Saint Paul is dotted with small cinder cones and vegetation-covered sand dunes.

== History and culture ==
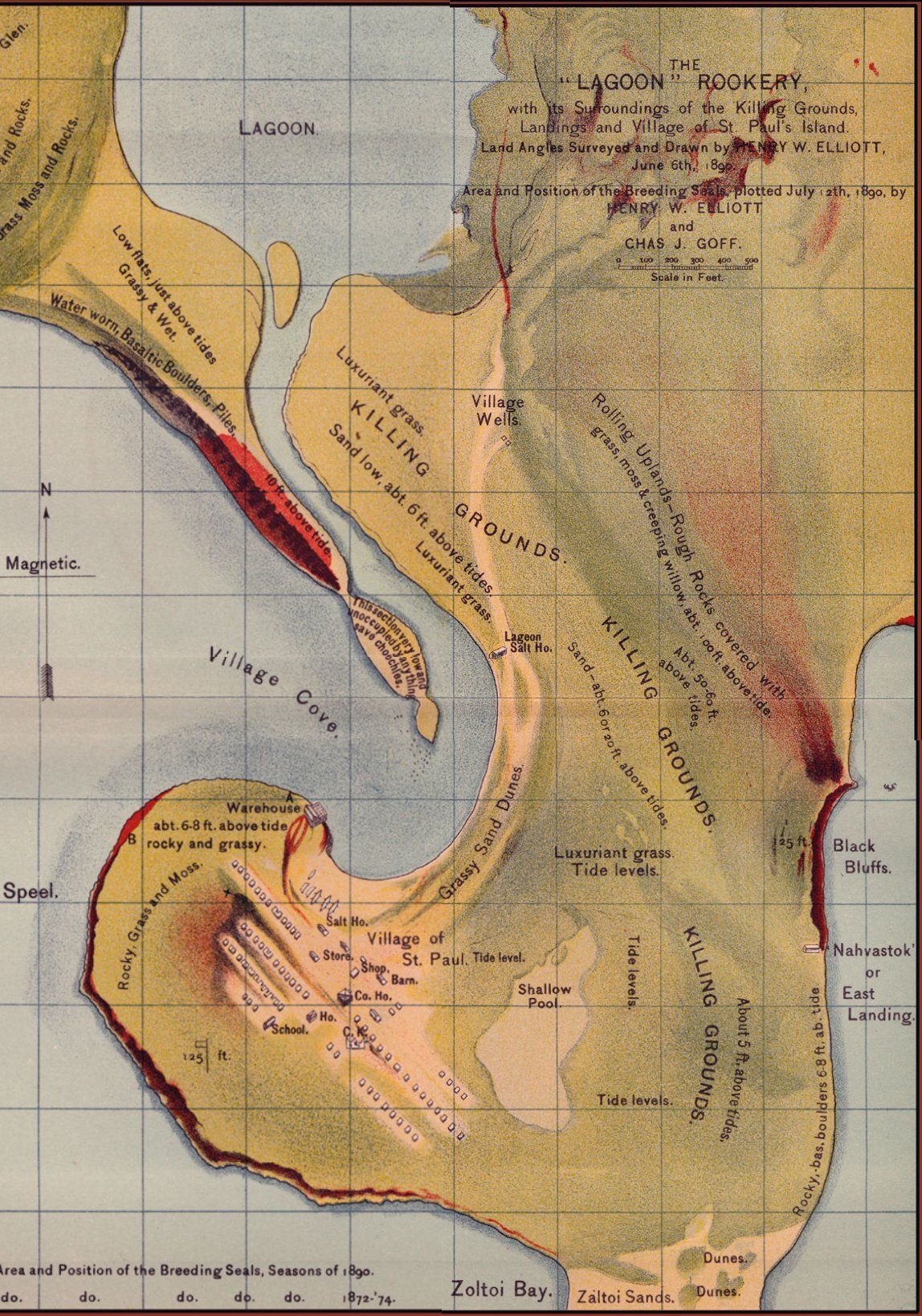
Map showing the village of Saint Paul and environs, circa 1890

The Aleut people knew of the Pribilofs long before Westerners discovered the islands. They called the islands Amiq, Aleut for "land of mother's brother" or "related land". According to their oral tradition, the son of an Unimak Island elder found them after paddling north in his boat in an attempt to survive a storm that caught him out at sea; when the winds finally died, he was lost in dense fog—until he heard the sounds of Saint Paul's vast seal colonies.

The Pribilofs, named after the Russian navigator Gavriil Pribylov, were discovered in 1786 by Russian fur traders; no Alaska Natives are known to have lived on the island prior to this point. They landed first on St. George on St. Peter and St. Paul's Day, July 12, 1788, and named the larger island to the north St. Peter and St. Paul Island. Three years later the Russian merchant vessel John the Baptist was shipwrecked off the shore. The crew were listed as missing until 1793, when the survivors were rescued by Gerasim Izmailov.

In the 18th century, the Russian-American Company forced Aleuts from the Aleutian chain (several hundred miles south of the Pribilofs) to hunt seal for them on the Pribilof Islands. Before this the Pribilofs were not regularly inhabited. The Aleuts were essentially slave labor for the Russians—hunting, cleaning, and preparing fur seal skins, which the Russians sold for a great deal of money. The Aleuts were not taken back to their home islands; they lived in inhumane conditions, they were beaten, and they were regulated by the Russians down to what they could eat and wear and whom they could marry. Their descendants live on the two islands today.

In 1870, the now-American owned Alaska Commercial Company (formerly the Russian-American Company) was awarded a 20-year sealing lease by the U.S. government, and provided housing, food and medical care to the Aleuts in exchange for seal harvesting. In 1890, a second 20-year lease was awarded to the North American Commercial Company, however, the fur seals had been severely over-harvested and only an estimated 200,000 fur seals remained. The 1910 Fur Seal Treaty ended private sealing on the islands and placed the community and fur seals under the U.S. Bureau of Fisheries. Food and clothing were scarce, social and racial segregation were practiced, and working conditions were poor.

Saints Peter and Paul Church, a Russian Orthodox church, was built on the island in 1907.

During World War II, as the Imperial Japanese Army threatened the Aleutians, the 881 Aleuts on the Pribilof islands were forcibly removed, with no more than several hours' notice, to internment in abandoned salmon canneries and mines in Southeast Alaska until May 1944. The Aleut men were brought back to the islands temporarily in the summer of 1943 to conduct the fur seal harvest for the federal government, seal oil being used in the war effort. Most Aleuts from the Pribilofs were imprisoned at Funter Bay on Admiralty Island in Southeast Alaska. In 1979, the Aleut people from the Pribilof islands received $8.5 million in partial compensation for the unfair and unjust treatment they were subject to under federal administration between 1870 and 1946. In 1983, Congress passed the Fur Seal Act Amendments, which ended government control of the commercial seal harvest and most of the federal presence on the island. Responsibility for providing community services and management of the fur seals was left to local entities. USD$20 million was provided to help develop and diversify the Island economy—USD$12 million to St. Paul and USD$8 million to St. George. Commercial harvesting on St. Paul ceased in 1985. Ownership of fur seal pelts is now prohibited except for subsistence purposes.

In May 2025, two F-16 fighter jets from the 8th Fighter Wing based in South Korea, made an emergency landing at St. Paul.

=== Climate change ===
Climate change poses a significant threat to the community of St. Paul. Warmer water means less ice; dying populations of fish, birds, and crabs; and more violent weather. The lack of ice results in accelerated coastal erosion, which threatens historical sites such as the community graveyard. Trident Seafoods closed the local crab processing plant. City funds have dropped by 60 percent, and the local police force has disbanded.

== Demographics ==
Historical population
Census	Pop.	Note	%±
1880	298		—
1890	244		−18.1%
1910	201		—
1920	212		5.5%
1930	247		16.5%
1940	299		21.1%
1950	359		20.1%
1960	378		5.3%
1970	450		19.0%
1980	551		22.4%
1990	763		38.5%
2000	532		−30.3%
2010	479		−10.0%
2020	413		−13.8%
U.S. Decennial Census

Saint Paul Island has the largest Aleut community in the United States, one of the U.S. government's officially recognized Native American tribal entities of Alaska. Out of a total population of 480 people, 457 of them (86 percent) are Alaska Natives.

Saint Paul first appeared on the 1880 U.S. Census as an unincorporated Aleut village. Of its 298 residents, 284 were Aleut and 14 were white. In 1890, it reported with 244 residents. A plurality of 111 were creole (mixed Russian & Native), 108 were Native, 22 were white and 3 were Asian. It did not report in 1900, but from 1910 to 1940, it reported as "Saint Paul Island." From 1950-onward, it has reported as Saint Paul. It formally incorporated in 1971.

=== 2020 census ===
As of the 2020 census, St. Paul had a population of 413. The median age was 37.5 years. 27.4% of residents were under the age of 18 and 9.9% of residents were 65 years of age or older. For every 100 females there were 123.2 males, and for every 100 females age 18 and over there were 122.2 males age 18 and over.

0.0% of residents lived in urban areas, while 100.0% lived in rural areas.

There were 135 households in St. Paul, of which 34.1% had children under the age of 18 living in them. Of all households, 31.1% were married-couple households, 24.4% were households with a male householder and no spouse or partner present, and 25.9% were households with a female householder and no spouse or partner present. About 34.1% of all households were made up of individuals and 13.3% had someone living alone who was 65 years of age or older.

There were 192 housing units, of which 29.7% were vacant. The homeowner vacancy rate was 2.7% and the rental vacancy rate was 34.7%.

Racial composition as of the 2020 census
Race	Number	Percent
White	26	6.3%
Black or African American	1	0.2%
American Indian and Alaska Native	358	86.7%
Asian	6	1.5%
Native Hawaiian and Other Pacific Islander	2	0.5%
Some other race	2	0.5%
Two or more races	18	4.4%
Hispanic or Latino (of any race)	5	1.2%

=== 2000 census ===
As of the census of 2000, there were 532 people, 177 households, and 123 families residing in the city. The population density was 13.2 inhabitants per square mile (5.1/km^{2}). There were 214 housing units at an average density of 5.3 units per square mile (2.0 units/km^{2}). The racial makeup of the city was 85.90% Native American, 12.97% white, 0.56% Pacific Islander, and 0.56% from two or more races.

There were 177 households, out of which 38.4% had children under the age of 18 living with them, 40.1% were married couples living together, 22.0% had a female householder with no husband present, and 30.5% were non-families. 24.9% of all households were made up of individuals, and 6.2% had someone living alone who was 65 years of age or older. The average household size was 2.88 and the average family size was 3.44.

In the city, the population was spread out, with 29.5% under the age of 18, 9.6% from 18 to 24, 32.5% from 25 to 44, 22.9% from 45 to 64, and 5.5% who were 65 years of age or older. The median age was 32 years. For every 100 females, there were 123.5 males. For every 100 females age 18 and over, there were 125.9 males.

The median income for a household in the city was $50,750, and the median income for a family was $51,750. Males had a median income of $32,583 versus $29,792 for females. The per capita income for the city was $18,408. About 6.4% of families and 11.9% of the population were below the poverty line, including 18.9% of those under age 18 and none of those age 65 or over.

== Nature and wildlife ==
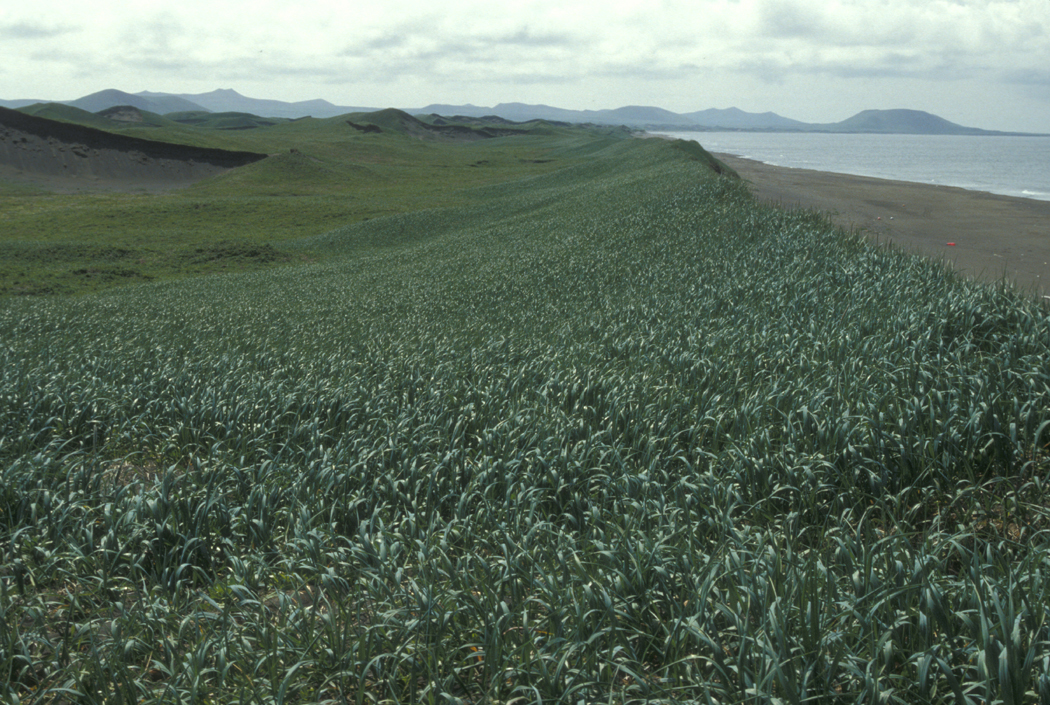
St. Paul Island, sand dune habitat Pribilof Islands

Saint Paul Island, like all of the Pribilof Islands, is part of the Alaska Maritime National Wildlife Refuge. Its seabird cliffs were purchased in 1982 for inclusion in the refuge. The island has also been designated as an Important Bird Area.

It is the breeding grounds for more than 500,000 northern fur seals and millions of seabirds, and is surrounded by one of the world's richest fishing grounds.

Woolly mammoths survived on Saint Paul Island until around 5,600 years ago (~3,600 BC), which is the most recent survival of North American mammoth populations. It is thought that this population died out as a result of diminishing fresh water, brought on by climate change making the island more arid, and exacerbated by the erosion of the few freshwater lakes present on the island that the mammoths used for drinking water as a result of mammoth activity.

A mass die-off of puffins at St. Paul Island between October 2016 and January 2017 has been attributed to ecosystem changes resulting from climate change. Climate change has also made it warm enough for rats to survive St. Paul's cold winters, and so as of 2024 the island's harbor is equipped with a number of traps to catch any rats carried in aboard ships.

=== Birds ===
319 species of birds have been recorded on the island. In spring (May through mid-June) and fall (August through October), many rare birds, including Siberian vagrants, may be spotted on the island. The cliffs of Saint Paul, Saint George and Otter Island support large numbers of breeding seabirds, including critical nesting habitat for the very range-restricted red-legged kittiwake. The auk family is well represented here, with horned and tufted puffin, thick-billed and common murre, parakeet, crested and least auklets and ancient murrelet occurring as breeders, and several other species occurring as vagrants or seasonal visitors. Breeding ducks include long-tailed duck, northern pintail, and green-winged teal. Breeding shorebirds include semipalmated plover, the Pribilof subspecies of rock sandpiper, least sandpiper and red-necked phalarope. Breeding landbirds are few but include snow bunting, Lapland longspur, insular subspecies of gray-crowned rosy finch and Pacific wren, and the occasional hoary and common redpoll and common raven.

=== Northern fur seals ===
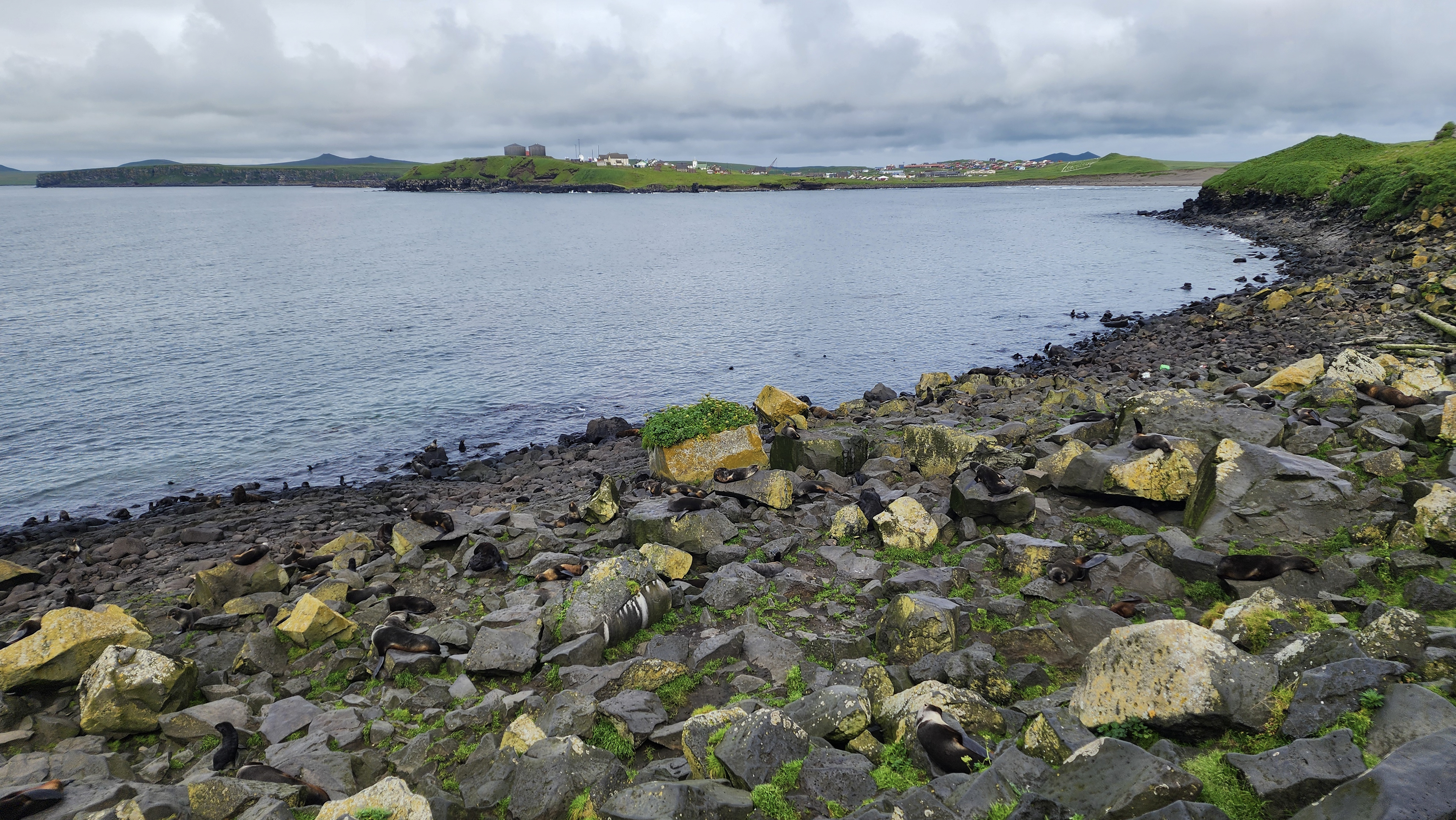
St Paul Island, seal rookeries in foreground, St Paul Village in distance.

The island hosts northern fur seal rookeries. The Pribilof Islands support about half of the global population, with some of the individual rookeries on Saint Paul Island containing over 100,000 seals. In late May, the male seals begin to arrive and stake out their territories in preparation for the arrival of the females, who typically arrive during the third week of June. The females give birth soon after making landfall, and by mid-July there will be hundreds of young pups around the island. On June 1, the rookeries are closed and remain off limits until mid-October. During the summer these marine mammals may be viewed, by permit, from blinds at two rookeries.

=== Harbor seals, sea lions, walrus, whales ===
Harbor seals breed on Otter Island, several miles southwest of St. Paul Island, but nonetheless are often seen off St. Paul shores. Occasionally, Steller sea lions haul out on St. Paul, but usually take refuge in the rookery at Walrus Island, some 10 miles (16 km) northeast of St. Paul. On extremely rare occasions, grey whales, orcas, and walrus are observed offshore.

=== Blue fox ===
The Blue fox is a subspecies of the Arctic fox. Endemic to the island, the fox can be found roaming the hills and climbing the cliffs as it scavenges for food. Though able to capture gulls, foxes near the town prefer to scavenge garbage and explore the fishing docks and processing plant. Foxes inhabiting areas farther from the human dwellings exhibit a more aggressive and territorial manner.

=== Reindeer ===
A large herd of reindeer roam the island of domesticated Russian stock, 25 reindeer were introduced to the island in the fall of 1911, but, after a peak of 2,046 organisms in 1938, the number decreased to 8 by 1950. By the 1960s, the herd had recovered from this population bottleneck, and as of 2017 numbered around 400.

=== Wildflowers ===
In spring, with the greening of the island, wildflowers begin to decorate the maritime tundra landscape. There are more than 100 species of wildflowers, from the Arctic lupine, with its bluish-purple blossoms, to the glowing yellow Alaska poppy, that can be viewed.

== Climate ==
Climate chart for St. Paul±

The climate of Saint Paul is Arctic maritime. The strong influence of the cold waters of the surrounding Bering Sea results in cool weather year-round and a narrow range of mean temperatures varying from 19 to 51 °F (−7.2 to 10.6 °C); thus the climate is classified as polar (Köppen ET) due to the raw chilliness of the summers.

The island experiences a relatively narrow range of temperatures, high wind, humidity and cloudiness levels, and persistent summer fog. There is high seasonal lag: February is the island's coldest month, while August is its warmest; the difference between the average low temperature in February and the average high temperature in August is only 31.8 °F (17.7 °C). Although the mean average temperature for the year is above freezing, at 35.9 °F (2.2 °C), the monthly daily average temperature remains below freezing from December to April. Low temperatures at or below 0 °F (−17.8 °C) occur an average of 4.7 nights per year (mostly from January to March), and the island is part of USDA Hardiness Zone 6. Extreme temperatures have ranged from −26 °F (−32.2 °C) on January 27, 1919, up to 66 °F (18.9 °C) on August 25, 1987 and August 14, 2020. January 1919 was also the coldest month with a mean of 5.3 °F (−14.8 °C), whilst the hottest was August 2016 with a mean of 52.9 °F (11.6 °C).

Winds are strong and persistent year-round, averaging around 15 miles per hour (24 km/h; 13 kn). They are strongest from late autumn through winter, when they increase to an average of nearly 20 miles per hour (32 km/h; 17 kn), blowing mostly from the north. In the summer, they become weaker and blow primarily from the south.

The island's humidity level, which averages more than 80 percent year round, is highest during the summer. Cloud cover levels peak during the summer as well. Although high year-round, with an average of 88 percent, cloud cover levels rise to 95 percent in the summer. Fog too is more common in the summer, occurring on roughly one-third of the days. The island receives about 23.8 inches (605 mm) of precipitation per year, with the highest monthly totals occurring between late summer and early winter, when Bering Sea storms batter the island. The wettest calendar year has been 1964 with 36.62 inches (930.1 mm) and the driest 1977 with 9.82 inches (249.4 mm), whilst the highest monthly rainfall of 9.32 inches or 236.7 millimeters occurred twice in August 1953 and September 2025. Snowfall levels are highest between December and March, averaging 61.7 inches or 1.6 meters per year, with the greatest occurring from July 1963 to June 1964 when 139.0 inches (3.5 m) fell, and the least from July 1936 to June 1937 with only 20.5 inches or 0.52 meters. Other than trace amounts, the period from June to September is generally snow-free. High winds and relatively warm temperatures combine to keep snow levels low, resulting in monthly mean snow depths of less than 6 inches or 0.15 meters, and a record depth of 37 inches or 0.94 meters on February 4 and 5, 2000.

Hours of daylight range from a low of 6.5 hours in midwinter to a high of 18 hours in midsummer.. Lightning and thunder are virtually unheard of. The last time a thunderstorm occurred in St. Paul was on November 8, 1982, which was the first thunderstorm in 40 years.

Climate data for St. Paul Island, Alaska (1991–2020 normals, (Note: Mean monthly maxima and minima (i.e. the highest and lowest temperature readings during an entire month or year) calculated based on data at said location from 1991 to 2020.) extremes 1892–present)
Month	Jan	Feb	Mar	Apr	May	Jun	Jul	Aug	Sep	Oct	Nov	Dec	Year
Record high °F (°C)	48 (9)	44 (7)	50 (10)	49 (9)	59 (15)	62 (17)	65 (18)	66 (19)	62 (17)	54 (12)	50 (10)	52 (11)	66 (19)
Mean maximum °F (°C)	38.3 (3.5)	37.5 (3.1)	38.2 (3.4)	41.3 (5.2)	49.0 (9.4)	54.8 (12.7)	58.6 (14.8)	58.1 (14.5)	54.4 (12.4)	49.4 (9.7)	44.0 (6.7)	40.5 (4.7)	60.4 (15.8)
Mean daily maximum °F (°C)	29.2 (−1.6)	29.4 (−1.4)	29.5 (−1.4)	34.1 (1.2)	40.8 (4.9)	47.5 (8.6)	51.6 (10.9)	53.0 (11.7)	50.1 (10.1)	43.6 (6.4)	37.7 (3.2)	33.1 (0.6)	40.0 (4.4)
Daily mean °F (°C)	25.3 (−3.7)	25.3 (−3.7)	25.1 (−3.8)	30.1 (−1.1)	36.6 (2.6)	43.1 (6.2)	47.9 (8.8)	49.5 (9.7)	46.0 (7.8)	39.5 (4.2)	33.9 (1.1)	28.9 (−1.7)	35.9 (2.2)
Mean daily minimum °F (°C)	21.4 (−5.9)	21.2 (−6.0)	20.8 (−6.2)	26.1 (−3.3)	32.4 (0.2)	38.7 (3.7)	44.2 (6.8)	46.1 (7.8)	41.9 (5.5)	35.3 (1.8)	30.1 (−1.1)	24.7 (−4.1)	31.9 (−0.1)
Mean minimum °F (°C)	4.7 (−15.2)	2.7 (−16.3)	4.7 (−15.2)	11.4 (−11.4)	23.3 (−4.8)	31.5 (−0.3)	37.6 (3.1)	39.0 (3.9)	31.2 (−0.4)	25.2 (−3.8)	17.6 (−8.0)	8.8 (−12.9)	−2.2 (−19.0)
Record low °F (°C)	−26 (−32)	−16 (−27)	−19 (−28)	−8 (−22)	8 (−13)	16 (−9)	28 (−2)	29 (−2)	22 (−6)	12 (−11)	4 (−16)	−5 (−21)	−26 (−32)
Average precipitation inches (mm)	1.61 (41)	1.43 (36)	1.29 (33)	1.04 (26)	1.02 (26)	1.31 (33)	1.98 (50)	3.06 (78)	3.00 (76)	3.32 (84)	2.97 (75)	2.30 (58)	24.33 (618)
Average snowfall inches (cm)	16.5 (42)	11.1 (28)	9.6 (24)	5.3 (13)	0.8 (2.0)	0.0 (0.0)	0.0 (0.0)	0.0 (0.0)	0.0 (0.0)	1.6 (4.1)	7.1 (18)	12.3 (31)	64.3 (163)
Average extreme snow depth inches (cm)	10.6 (27)	12.3 (31)	10.6 (27)	10.1 (26)	3.4 (8.6)	0.0 (0.0)	0.0 (0.0)	0.0 (0.0)	0.0 (0.0)	0.6 (1.5)	3.2 (8.1)	7.7 (20)	16.3 (41)
Average precipitation days (≥ 0.01 in)	17.2	16.3	14.0	12.2	12.3	11.4	14.1	17.8	19.5	22.5	23.0	21.5	201.8
Average snowy days (≥ 0.1 in)	14.9	13.7	13.4	9.4	2.2	0.0	0.0	0.0	0.0	3.3	10.7	15.3	82.9
Average relative humidity (%)	84.7	85.0	85.9	85.5	88.0	90.0	93.8	93.7	88.8	82.7	82.6	83.2	87.0
Average dew point °F (°C)	23.0 (−5.0)	18.7 (−7.4)	21.0 (−6.1)	25.0 (−3.9)	31.6 (−0.2)	38.3 (3.5)	44.1 (6.7)	45.7 (7.6)	41.4 (5.2)	33.1 (0.6)	28.6 (−1.9)	24.4 (−4.2)	31.2 (−0.4)
Source: NOAA (relative humidity and dew point 1961–1990)

See or edit raw graph data.

== Facilities and utilities ==
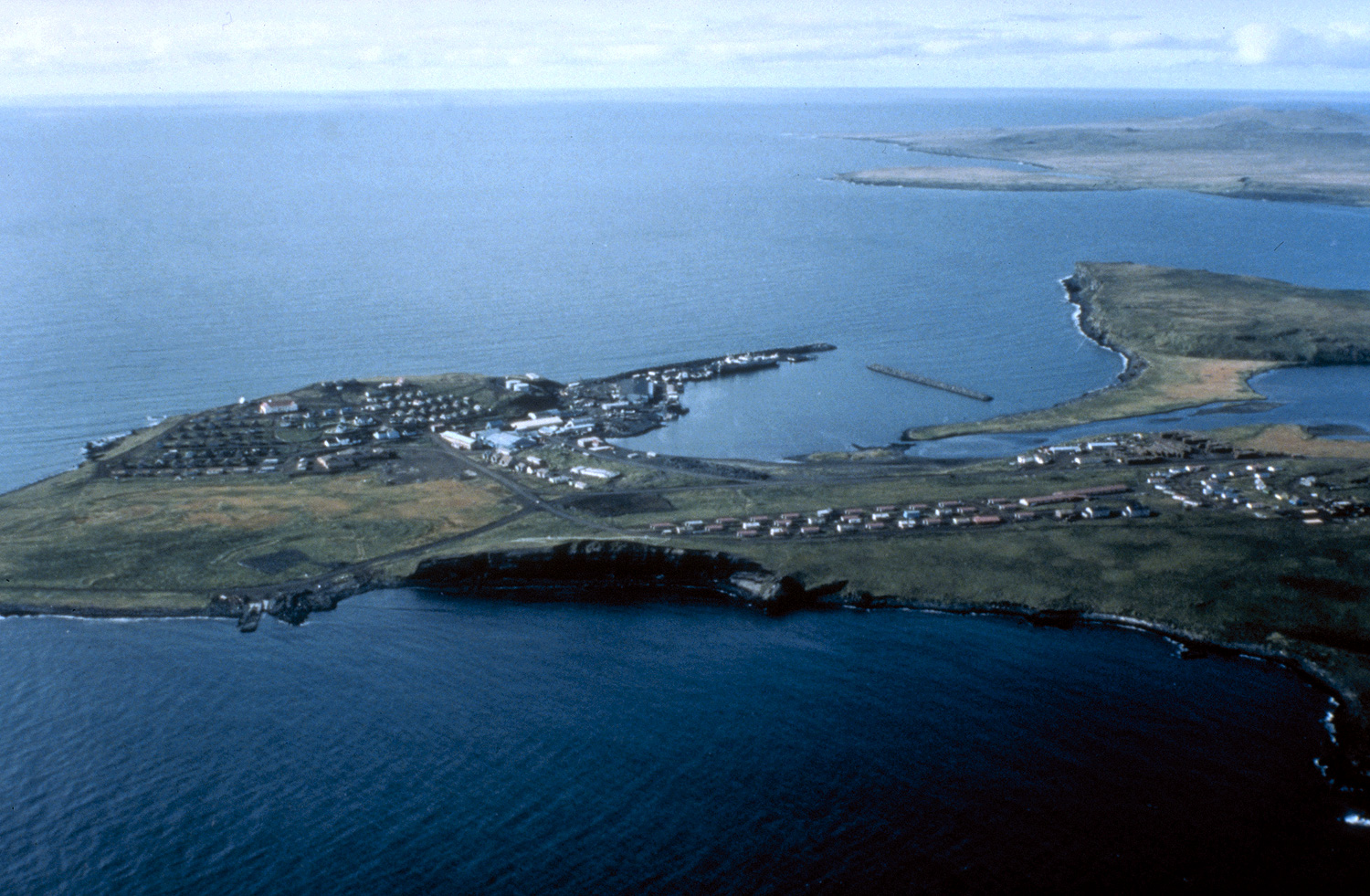
Aerial view of St. Paul

Water is supplied by wells and an aquifer and is treated. There are two new wooden tanks; one 500,000 gallon and one 300,000 gallon. All 167 homes and facilities are connected to the piped water and sewer system and are fully plumbed. An ocean outfall line was recently added for seafood processing waste. The city collects refuse. The Tribe operates a recycling program which is currently on hold. A landfill, incinerator, sludge and oil disposal site have recently been completed. A new $3 million power plant came online in 2000. A small wind turbine provides power and hot water to the village office, but it is not connected to the power grid. Electricity is provided by St. Paul Municipal Electric Utility.

TDX Power's first energy-generation facility was built on St. Paul Island. Completed in 1999, the wind energy-based electric and thermal cogeneration facility was widely regarded as one of the more technologically advanced wind-energy power projects in America. The TDX Power wind/diesel hybrid facility is known for its efficiency and reduction in diesel fuel consumption. The 120 ft (37 m)-tall turbine is a major point of pride for the ecologically conscious Aleut community of Saint Paul. Two additional units were installed in 2007. Each unit is rated at 225 kW and the blade lengths are 44.3 ft (13.5 m).

== Health care ==
Local hospitals or health clinics include St. Paul Health Clinic. The clinic is a qualified Emergency Care Center. St. Paul is classified as an isolated town/Sub-Regional Center. It is found in EMS Region 2H in the Aleutian/Pribilof Region. Currently the City of St. Paul's Department of Public Safety provides no emergency medical services to residents or visitors on island. Two advanced life support ambulances sit idle at the community clinic due to a lack of staffing and funding provided for by the city.

== Education ==
St. Paul is served by the Pribilof Island School District, headquartered in the city. St. Paul School is attended by 73 students.

== Economy and transportation ==
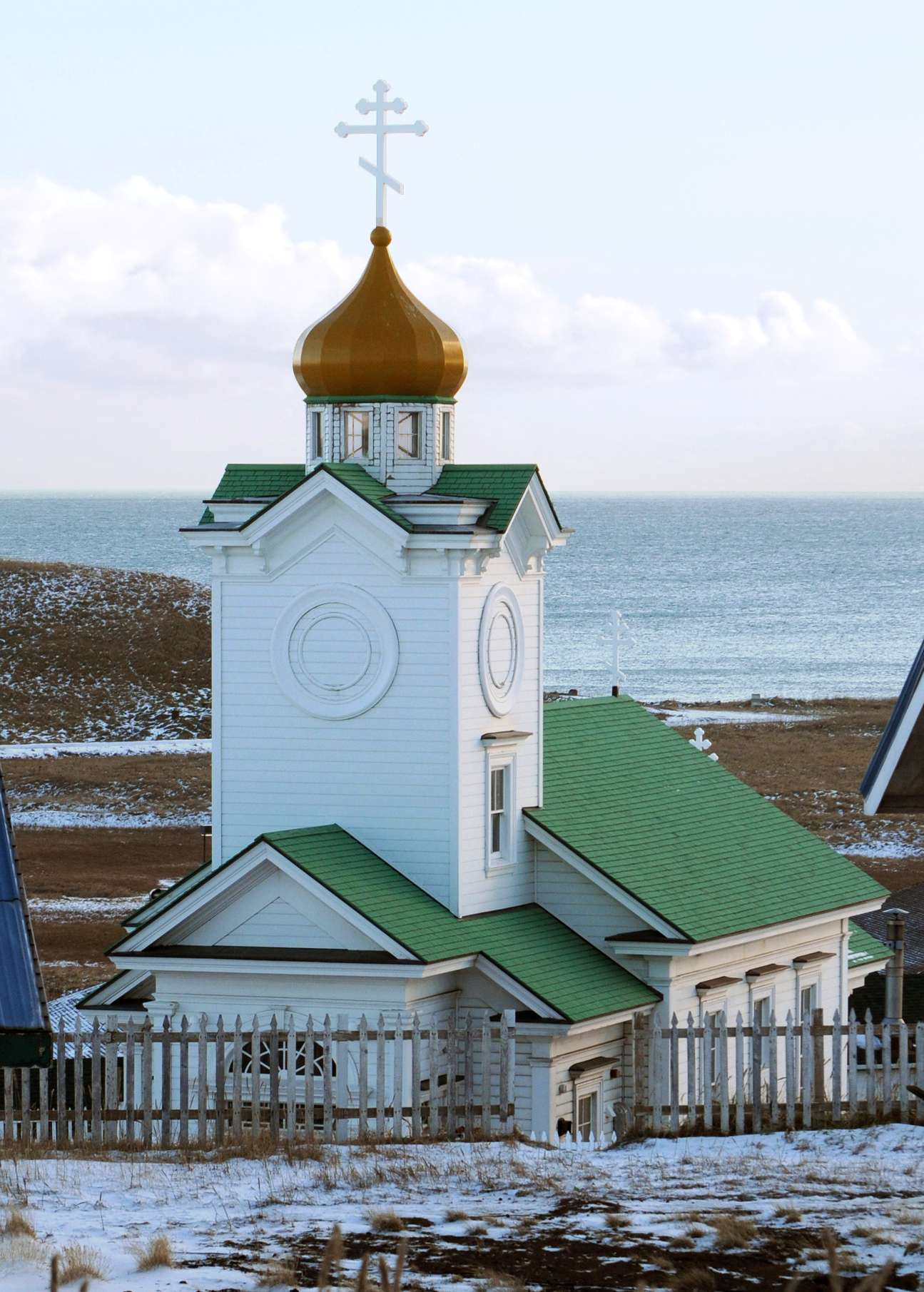
Sts. Peter and Paul Russian Orthodox Church, built in 1907

Some of the island's residents stay only part of the year and work in the crab and boat yards. The large boats that have been fishing the Bering Sea offload their fish onto the island and workers prepare them for shipping around the world.

The federally controlled fur seal industry dominated the economy of the Pribilofs until 1985. St. Paul is a port for the Central Bering Sea fishing fleet, and major harbor improvements have fueled economic growth. Trident Seafoods and Icicle Seafoods process cod, crab, halibut and other seafoods in St. Paul. 30 residents hold commercial fishing permits for halibut. Several offshore processors are serviced out of St. Paul. The community is seeking funds to develop a halibut processing facility. Fur seal rookeries and more than 210 species of nesting seabirds attract almost 700 tourists annually. There is also a reindeer herd on the island from a previous commercial venture. Residents subsist on halibut, fur seals (1,645 may be taken each year), reindeer, marine invertebrates, plants and berries.

St. Paul is accessible by sea and air. Most supplies and freight arrive by ship. There is a breakwater, 700 feet (210 m) of dock space, and a barge off-loading area. A small boat harbor was completed in 2009-2010 by the Corps of Engineers.

The island has an airport, St. Paul Island Airport, primarily serviced by Aleutian Airways. Security Aviation and Grant Aviation provides chartered flights to the island as well as other regularly scheduled flights to Dutch Harbor. There is one asphalt north–south oriented runway that is 6,500 feet (2,000 m) in length. Runway 36 has an ILS approach system, allowing for instrument approaches during times of fog and low ceilings.

== Media ==
St. Paul is served by KUHB-FM 91.9, an NPR affiliate that broadcasts a wide variety of programming and music. St. Paul also has two low-power translators of the statewide Alaska Rural Communications Service on Channel 4 (K04HM) and Channel 9 (K09RB-D).

Novastoshnah, the northeastern presque-isle of the island, and Lukannon, on the island's south peninsula (see survey map above) are settings of the Rudyard Kipling story "The White Seal" and poem "Lukannon" in The Jungle Book. Walrus Island, visible on the same map off to the east, is also mentioned in the same story.

== See also ==
- Alaskan king crab fishing
- Deadliest Catch
