= St. George Airport (Alaska) =

- IATA: STG; ICAO: PAPB; FAA LID: PBV

Summary
- Airport type: Public
- Owner: State of Alaska DOT&PF - Central Region
- Serves: St. George, Alaska
- Elevation AMSL: 125 ft / 38 m
- Coordinates: 56°34′38″N 169°39′49″W

Map
- Location of airport in Alaska

Runways
Direction	Length		Surface
Direction	ft	m	Surface
11/29	4,980	1,518	Asphalt

Statistics (2006)
- Aircraft operations: 264
- Source: Federal Aviation Administration

St. George Airport (IATA: STG, ICAO: PAPB, FAA LID: PBV) is a state-owned public-use airport located four nautical miles (5 mi, 7 km) from the central business district of St. George, a city on St. George Island in the Aleutians West Census Area of the U.S. state of Alaska. Scheduled passenger airline service is provided by Grant Aviation.

As per Federal Aviation Administration records, the airport had 604 passenger boardings (enplanements) in calendar year 2008, 610 enplanements in 2009, and 643 in 2010. It is included in the National Plan of Integrated Airport Systems for 2011–2015, which categorized it as a general aviation airport (the commercial service category requires at least 2,500 enplanements per year).

== Facilities and aircraft ==
St. George Airport covers an area of 278 acres (113 ha) at an elevation of 125 feet (38 m) above mean sea level. It has one runway designated 11/29 with an asphalt surface measuring 4,980 by 150 feet (1,518 x 46 m). For the 12-month period ending December 31, 2006, the airport had 264 aircraft operations, an average of 22 per month: 98% air taxi and 2% general aviation.

Pilots are requested to avoid flights below 1000 feet above ground level from May 1 to October 31 in certain areas of St. George Island with active bird populations and seal rookeries.

== Airline and destinations ==
The following airline offers scheduled passenger service:

Airlines	Destinations
Grant Aviation	Cold Bay, St. Paul, Unalaska/Dutch Harbor

== See also ==
- List of airports in Alaska
