= Sts. Peter and Paul Church (St. Paul Island, Alaska) =

Historic church in Alaska, United States

- U.S. National Register of Historic Places
- U.S. National Historic Landmark District – Contributing property
- Alaska Heritage Resources Survey
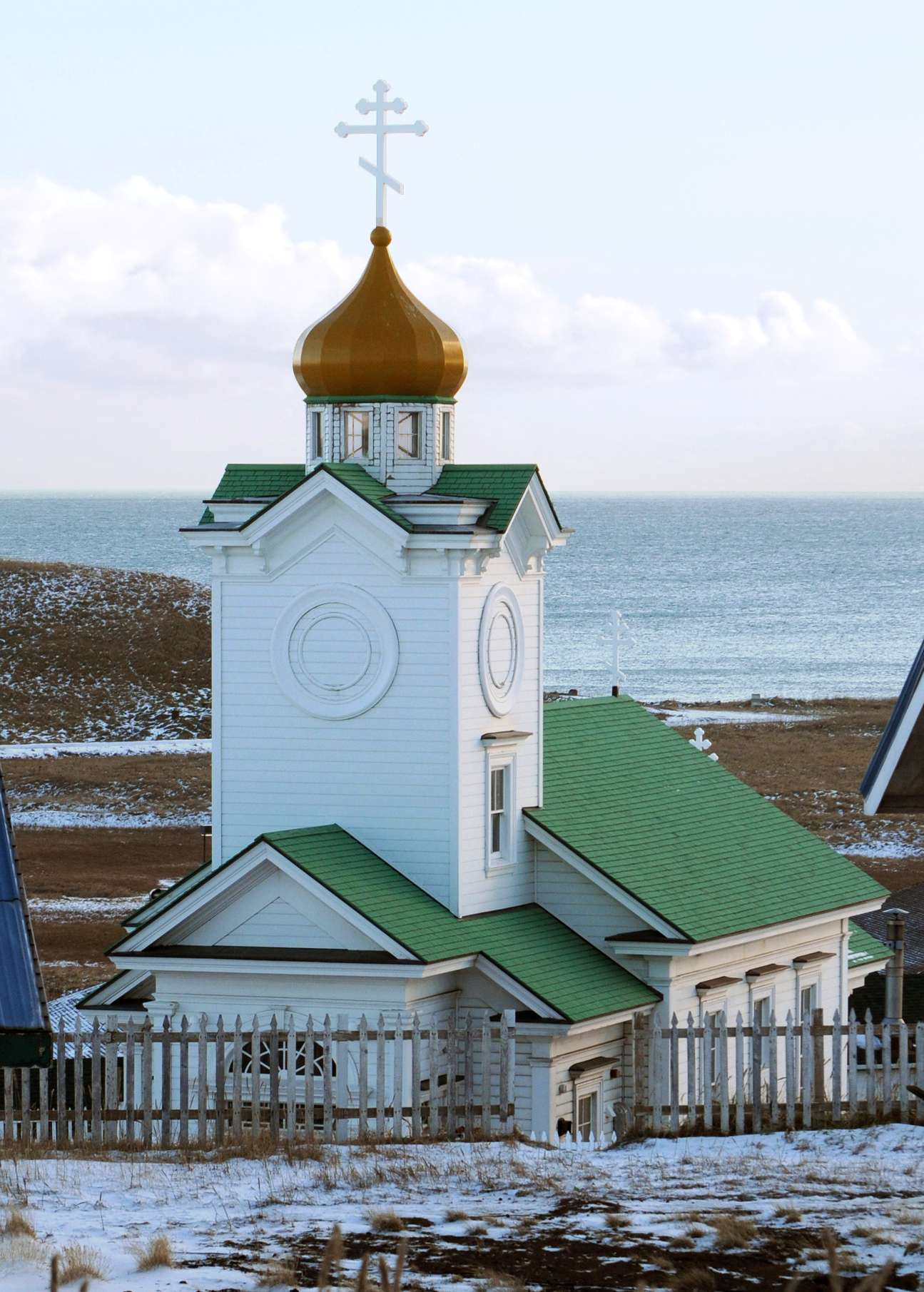
- Church in November, 2010

- Location within Alaska
- Location: St. Paul Island, Alaska
- Coordinates: 57°07′15″N 170°16′51″W
- Area: less than one acre
- Built: 1907
- Part of: Seal Island Historic District (ID66000156)
- MPS: Russian Orthodox Church Buildings and Sites TR
- NRHP reference No.: 80000744
- AHRS No.: XPI-003

Significant dates
- Added to NRHP: June 6, 1980
- Designated NHLDCP: June 13, 1962
- Designated AHRS: May 18, 1973

Sts. Peter and Paul Church (Russian: Св. Церковь Петра и Павла) is a Russian Orthodox church on St. Paul Island, Alaska. The current church, built in 1907, was listed on the National Register of Historic Places in 1980. It is now under the Diocese of Alaska of the Orthodox Church in America.

A first church was built in 1779 "according to legend"; a second church was built in 1819 atop the island's tallest hill. The current church was built in 1907, and was then "one of the most ambitiously designed and effectively executed small churches of the Byzantine tradition in Alaska". Its onion domes, however, were repeatedly damaged in storms, and have been replaced.

== See also ==
- National Register of Historic Places listings in Aleutians West Census Area, Alaska
