= Pribilof Island School District =

School district in Alaska, United States

Address
- 930 Tolstoi Boulevard St. Paul Island, Alaska, 99660; United States

District information
- Type: Public
- Grades: PreK–12
- NCES District ID: 0200670

Students and staff
- Students: 65
- Teachers: 5.35
- Staff: 8.65
- Student–teacher ratio: 12.15

Other information
- Website: web.archive.org/web/20260117005451/https://www.pribilofsd.org/

Pribilof Island School District or Pribilof School District is a school district headquartered on the grounds of St. Paul School in St. Paul, Alaska. It serves students living on the two inhabited Pribilof Islands, Saint Paul Island and Saint George Island.

== Schools ==
The district operates St. Paul School, which has 73 K-12 students, and a correspondence program, which has eight K-10 students.

Until 2017, the district also operated St. George School. The school was forced to close due after its enrollment fell under the minimum of ten students required to receive state funding. The students on that island are served by the correspondence program.
