= Walrus Island (Pribilof Islands) =

Island in the Bering Sea

Coordinates: 57°10′57.42″N 169°56′48.56″W

Location in Alaska

Walrus Island (Russian: Моржовый остров) is a small islet located 15 km east of Saint Paul Island, Alaska in the Bering Sea. It is part of the Pribilof Islands group. Its length is 2,130 feet (650 m) and its area is 50.3 acres (0.2036 km^{2}). There is no resident population.

The name of this island is a translation from the Russian "Ostrov Morzhovoy" meaning "Walrus Island," published by Capt. Lt. Vasiliev of the Imperial Russian Navy (IRN) in 1829 (map 3).

Walrus Island, like all of the Pribilof Islands, is part of the Alaska Maritime National Wildlife Refuge.

Steller sea lions usually take refuge in the rookery at Walrus Island

Walrus Island is mentioned in the Rudyard Kipling story "The White Seal".

This islet should not be confused with the Walrus Islands in the Walrus Islands State Game Sanctuary, located close to Hagemeister Island (in the Dillingham Census Area), nor with Walrus Island located in the southeastern shores of the Bristol Bay (in the Aleutians East Borough).
