= Otter Island (Alaska) =

Coordinates: 57°02′45″N 170°24′00″W

Location in Alaska

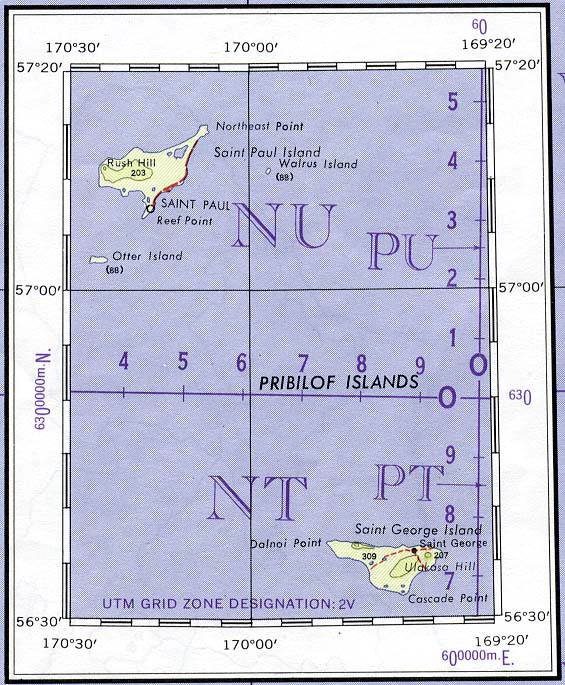
Map of Otter Island (north west)

19th-century illustration of a boat near Otter Island, Alaska.

Sketch of seabirds flying near Otter Island

A drawing of some seabirds flying towards Otter Island

Otter Island is a small island located 6 miles (9.7 km) southwest of Saint Paul Island, Alaska, in the Bering Sea. It is a member of the Pribilof Islands. Its land area is 165.21 acres (0.6686 km^{2}) and there is no resident population. The highest point on the island is 935 feet (285 m) above sea level. The island is closed to hunting. Harbor seals breed on Otter Island. Like all of the Pribilof Islands, it is part of the Alaska Maritime National Wildlife Refuge.

The island is 0.580 miles (934 m) long and 0.90 miles (1.45 km) wide.
