= St. George, Alaska =

St. George Anĝaaxchalux̂
- City
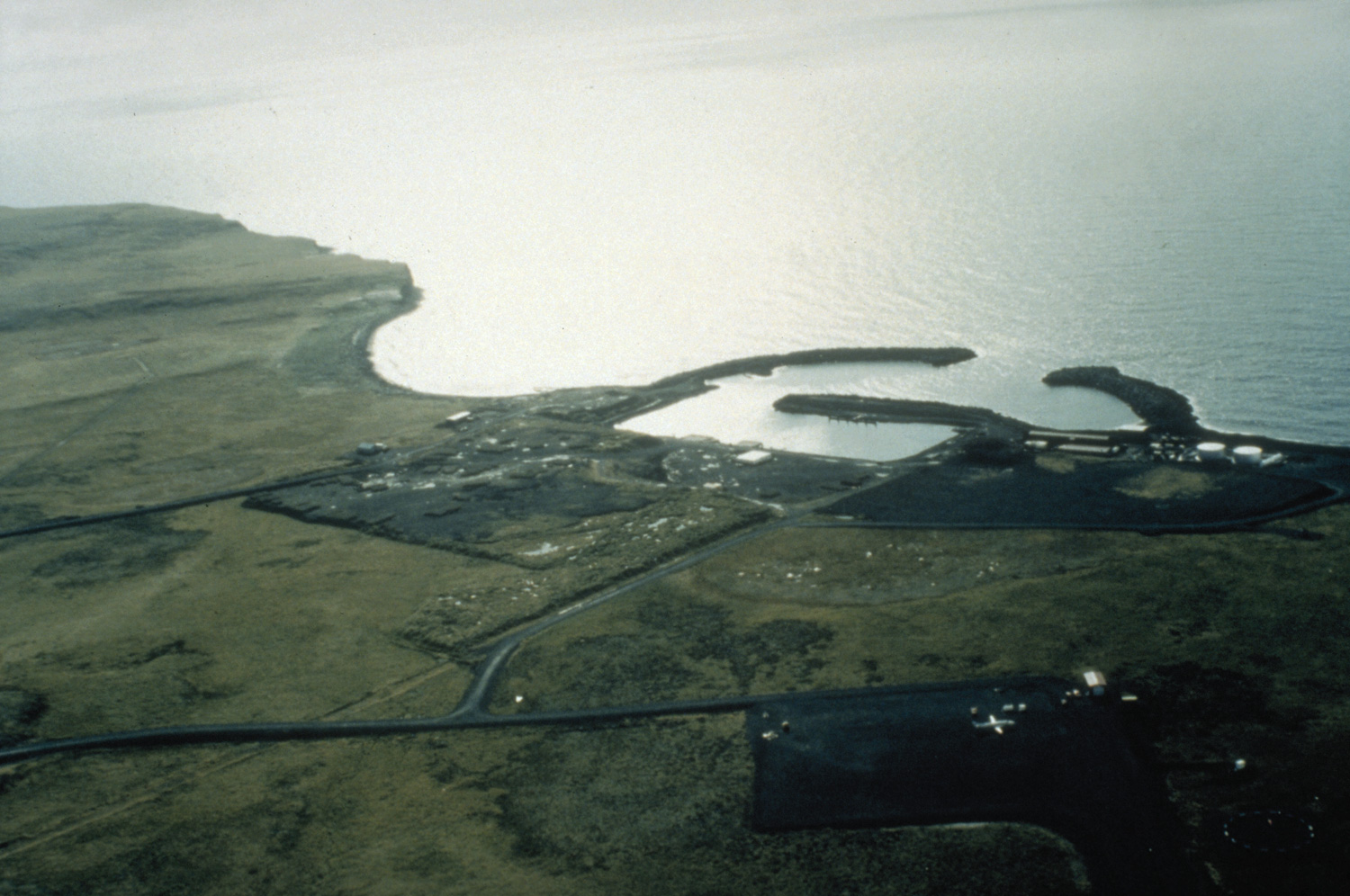
- Aerial view of St. George harbor

- Location in Alaska
- Coordinates: 56°36′20″N 169°33′35″W
- Country: United States
- State: Alaska
- Census Area: Aleutians West
- Incorporated: September 13, 1983

Government
  - Mayor: Mark Merculief
  - State senator: Lyman Hoffman (D)
  - State rep.: Bryce Edgmon (I)

Area
  - Total: 182.31 sq mi (472.17 km^{2})
  - Land: 34.78 sq mi (90.08 km^{2})
  - Water: 147.53 sq mi (382.09 km^{2})
- Elevation: 200 ft (60 m)

Population (2020)
  - Total: 67
  - Density: 1.9/sq mi (0.74/km^{2})
- Time zone: UTC-9 (Alaska (AKST))
  - Summer (DST): UTC-8 (AKDT)
- ZIP code: 99591
- Area code: 907
- FIPS code: 02-65800
- GNIS feature ID: 1419161
- Website: www.stgeorgealaska.com/index.asp

St. George (Aleut: Anĝaaxchalux̂ or Sangiurgiix̂, Russian: Сент-Джордж) is a city in Aleutians West Census Area, Alaska, United States. It is the main settlement of St. George Island in the Pribilofs, a small island group in the Bering Sea. As of the 2020 census, the population was 67, down from 102 in 2010 and the lowest figure since records began in 1880.

== History ==
The island was discovered by Gavriil Pribylov on June 25, 1786, during a search for the breeding grounds of northern fur seals. The island is named after Pribylov's ship, the St. George. St. George Island was the first of the Pribilofs to be discovered.

Built in 1935, the sole church on the island is St. George Church, an Eastern Orthodox Church in the Diocese of Alaska of the Orthodox Church in America.

On February 29, 1996 the crab-fishing vessel All American ran aground on the island without loss of life.

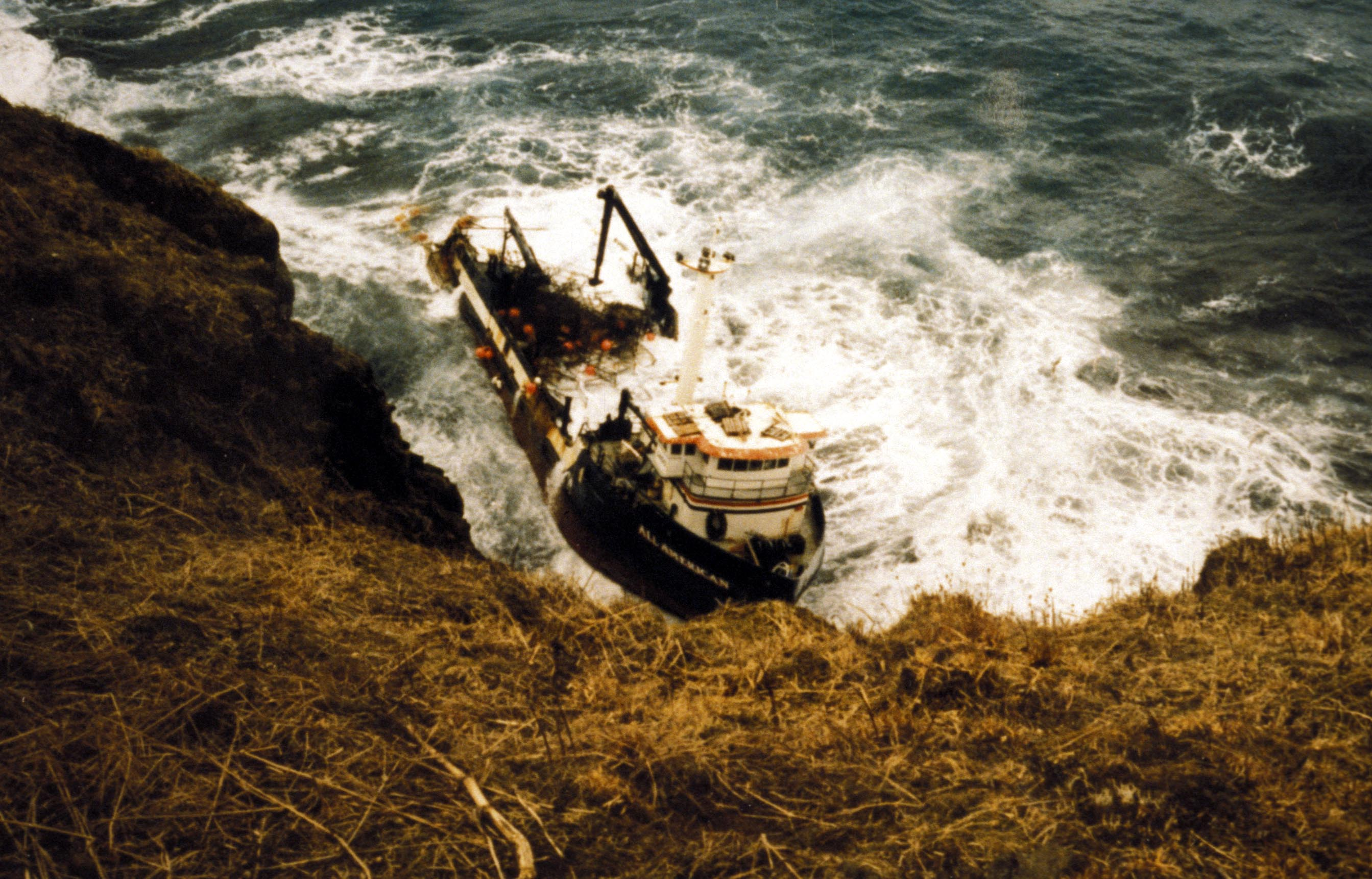
The 1996 wreck of the crab-fishing vessel All American on St. George Island

== Geography ==
St. George is located at 56°36′20″N 169°33′35″W (56.605546, −169.559584).

According to the U.S. Census Bureau, the city has a total area of 182.4 square miles (472 km^{2}), of which, 34.8 square miles (90 km^{2}) of it is land and 147.6 square miles (382 km^{2}) of it (80.94%) is water.

The city is served by an airport with scheduled service to St. Paul Island Airport and Unalaska Airport provided by Grant Aviation. Alaska Central Express also offers flights to Anchorage.

=== Climate ===
Climate data for St. George, Alaska (1991–2020)
Month	Jan	Feb	Mar	Apr	May	Jun	Jul	Aug	Sep	Oct	Nov	Dec	Year
Record high °F (°C)	43 (6)	44 (7)	44 (7)	48 (9)	63 (17)	62 (17)	71 (22)	66 (19)	59 (15)	52 (11)	47 (8)	44 (7)	71 (22)
Mean maximum °F (°C)	38.9 (3.8)	39.0 (3.9)	39.5 (4.2)	42.6 (5.9)	50.7 (10.4)	54.5 (12.5)	58.9 (14.9)	58.3 (14.6)	53.8 (12.1)	48.8 (9.3)	43.8 (6.6)	41.4 (5.2)	61.0 (16.1)
Mean daily maximum °F (°C)	30.3 (−0.9)	31.5 (−0.3)	31.4 (−0.3)	35.4 (1.9)	41.7 (5.4)	47.2 (8.4)	51.2 (10.7)	52.4 (11.3)	49.6 (9.8)	43.3 (6.3)	37.9 (3.3)	33.7 (0.9)	40.5 (4.7)
Daily mean °F (°C)	26.5 (−3.1)	27.7 (−2.4)	27.3 (−2.6)	31.5 (−0.3)	37.6 (3.1)	43.3 (6.3)	47.8 (8.8)	49.3 (9.6)	46.0 (7.8)	39.5 (4.2)	34.1 (1.2)	29.8 (−1.2)	36.7 (2.6)
Mean daily minimum °F (°C)	22.8 (−5.1)	24.0 (−4.4)	23.3 (−4.8)	27.6 (−2.4)	33.5 (0.8)	39.4 (4.1)	44.4 (6.9)	46.2 (7.9)	42.4 (5.8)	35.7 (2.1)	30.4 (−0.9)	25.9 (−3.4)	33.0 (0.6)
Mean minimum °F (°C)	9.3 (−12.6)	9.5 (−12.5)	10.9 (−11.7)	15.0 (−9.4)	25.2 (−3.8)	32.4 (0.2)	38.5 (3.6)	39.9 (4.4)	32.7 (0.4)	25.8 (−3.4)	20.1 (−6.6)	11.2 (−11.6)	4.1 (−15.5)
Record low °F (°C)	0 (−18)	−6 (−21)	−4 (−20)	−3 (−19)	15 (−9)	26 (−3)	30 (−1)	32 (0)	27 (−3)	16 (−9)	14 (−10)	3 (−16)	−6 (−21)
Average precipitation inches (mm)	1.17 (30)	1.06 (27)	0.80 (20)	0.89 (23)	1.01 (26)	1.26 (32)	1.97 (50)	2.66 (68)	2.53 (64)	3.00 (76)	2.25 (57)	1.78 (45)	20.38 (518)
Average precipitation days (≥ 0.01 in)	13.8	14.1	11.1	12.3	13.1	11.5	14.5	17.2	19.1	22.9	21.0	18.7	189.3
Source: NOAA

== Demographics ==
Historical population
Census	Pop.	Note	%±
1880	92		—
1890	93		1.1%
1910	90		—
1920	138		53.3%
1930	153		10.9%
1940	183		19.6%
1950	187		2.2%
1960	264		41.2%
1970	163		−38.3%
1980	158		−3.1%
1990	138		−12.7%
2000	152		10.1%
2010	102		−32.9%
2020	67		−34.3%
U.S. Decennial Census

St. George first appeared on the 1880 U.S. Census as an unincorporated Aleut village. Of its 92 residents, 88 were Aleut and 4 were White. It returned again in 1890 with 93 residents, reporting 49 Natives (presumably Aleut), 36 Creoles (Mixed Russian & Native), and 8 Whites. It did not report on the 1900 census. From 1910 to 1940, it reported as "St. George Island." In 1950, it reported as St. George. In 1960, it reported again as "St. George Island." From 1970-onwards, it has reported as St. George. It formally incorporated in 1983.

=== 2020 census ===
As of the 2020 census, St. George had a population of 67. The median age was 44.5 years. 19.4% of residents were under the age of 18 and 20.9% of residents were 65 years of age or older. For every 100 females there were 131.0 males, and for every 100 females age 18 and over there were 116.0 males age 18 and over.

0.0% of residents lived in urban areas, while 100.0% lived in rural areas.

There were 26 households in St. George, of which 26.9% had children under the age of 18 living in them. Of all households, 11.5% were married-couple households, 30.8% were households with a male householder and no spouse or partner present, and 38.5% were households with a female householder and no spouse or partner present. About 42.3% of all households were made up of individuals and 19.2% had someone living alone who was 65 years of age or older.

There were 52 housing units, of which 50.0% were vacant. The homeowner vacancy rate was 0.0% and the rental vacancy rate was 31.3%.

Racial composition as of the 2020 census
Race	Number	Percent
White	2	3.0%
Black or African American	0	0.0%
American Indian and Alaska Native	60	89.6%
Asian	0	0.0%
Native Hawaiian and Other Pacific Islander	0	0.0%
Some other race	1	1.5%
Two or more races	4	6.0%
Hispanic or Latino (of any race)	2	3.0%

=== 2000 census ===
As of the census of 2000, there were 152 people, 51 households, and 42 families residing in the city. The population density was 4.4 inhabitants per square mile (1.7/km^{2}). There were 67 housing units at an average density of 1.9 units per square mile (0.73 units/km^{2}). The racial makeup of the city was 92.11% Alaska Native and 7.89% White.

There were 51 households, out of which 47.1% had children under the age of 18 living with them, 54.9% were married couples living together, 15.7% had a female householder with no husband present, and 17.6% were non-families. 15.7% of all households were made up of individuals, and none had someone living alone who was 65 years of age or older. The average household size was 2.98 and the average family size was 3.29.

In the city, the age distribution of the population shows 36.8% under the age of 18, 5.3% from 18 to 24, 31.6% from 25 to 44, 19.7% from 45 to 64, and 6.6% who were 65 years of age or older. The median age was 33 years. For every 100 females, there were 92.4 males. For every 100 females aged 18 and over, there were 113.3 males.

The median income for a household in the city was $57,083, and the median income for a family was $60,625. Males had a median income of $50,625 versus $31,250 for females. The per capita income for the city was $21,131. About 4.9% of families and 7.9% of the population were below the poverty line, including 4.0% of those under the age of eighteen and none of those 65 or over.

== Education ==
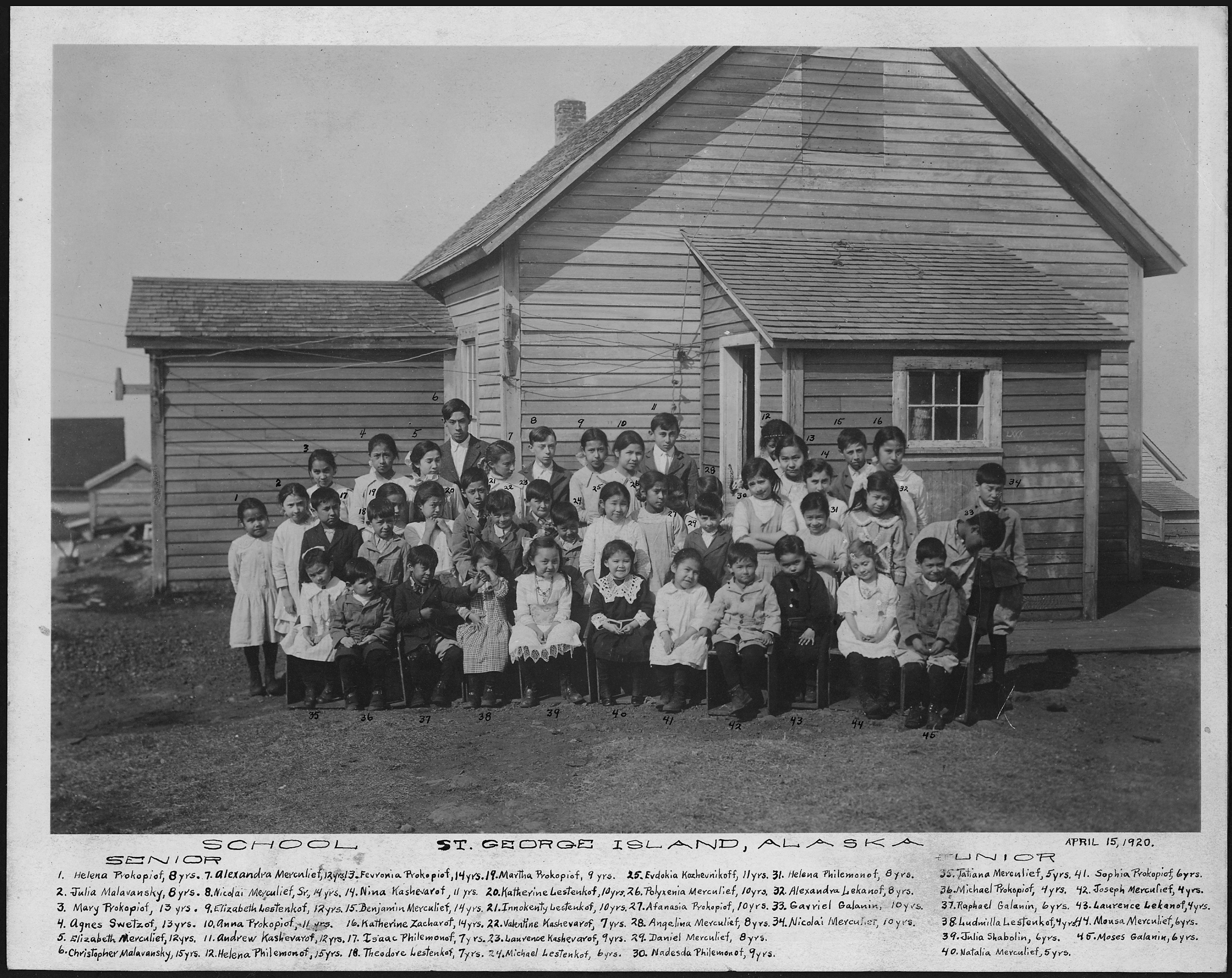
School children on St. George (15.April.1920)

St. George is served by the Pribilof Island School District. In 2004, the district began offering 9–12th grade to St. George students via video conference. Students have a choice: they can live at home and attend distance education classes or they can leave home and attend a boarding school like Mt. Edgecumbe High School.

In 2017, St. George School was closed entirely due to low enrollment. The district now offers a correspondence program for grades K-10.

== Geography and wildlife ==
The island is notable as being the breeding site of over 75% of the known population of red-legged kittiwakes.

In 2016, a new species of beaked whale, Berardius beringiae, was discovered near the island.

St. George Island is considered part of the Bering Sea Volcanic Province.
