= St. George the Great Martyr Orthodox Church =

Historic church in Alaska, United States

- U.S. National Register of Historic Places
- U.S. National Historic Landmark District – Contributing property
- Alaska Heritage Resources Survey
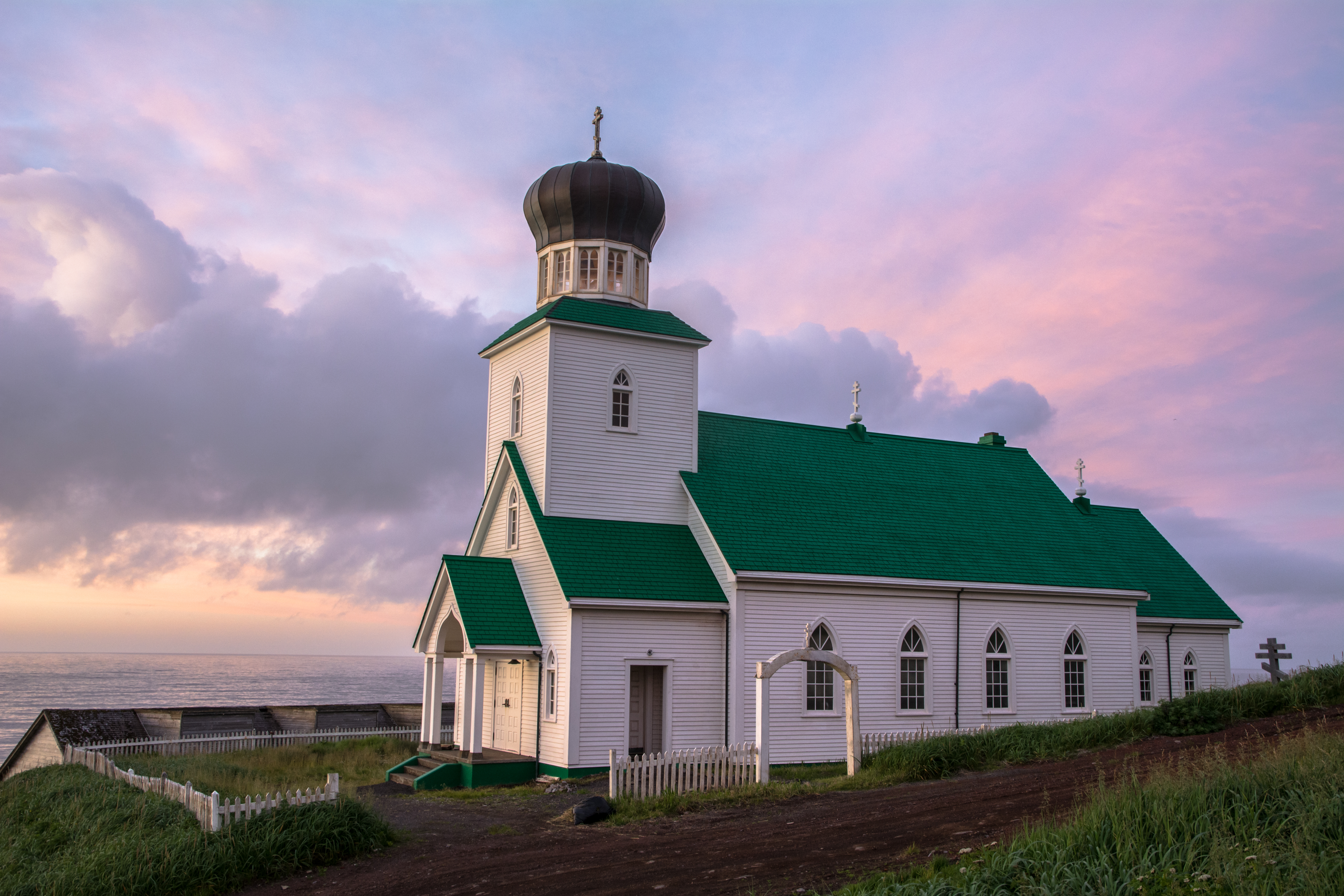

- Location within Alaska
- Location: On St. George Island, St. George, Alaska
- Coordinates: 56°36′7″N 169°32′52″W
- Area: less than one acre
- Built: 1935
- Part of: Seal Island Historic District (ID66000156)
- MPS: Russian Orthodox Church Buildings and Sites TR
- NRHP reference No.: 80000743
- AHRS No.: XPI-004

Significant dates
- Added to NRHP: June 6, 1980
- Designated NHLDCP: June 13, 1962
- Designated AHRS: May 18, 1973

St. George the Great Martyr Orthodox Church (Russian: Православная церковь Св. Георгия Великого мученика) is a historic Russian Orthodox church on St. George Island, Alaska. It is now under the Diocese of Alaska of the Orthodox Church in America.

A first church was built on the island during 1870–78; the current church was built about five miles away in about 1935. As there were no trees on the island, all materials had to be brought in. According to a 1979 evaluation, "of all the R. O. village churches and chapels in Alaska, this may be the best example of effective balance and integration of classic designs to produce a building pleasing to the eye and utile in its purpose."

The current church was added to the National Register of Historic Places in 1980.

== See also ==
- National Register of Historic Places listings in Aleutians West Census Area, Alaska
