= Aleutians West Census Area, Alaska =

Census area in Alaska, United States

- Borough
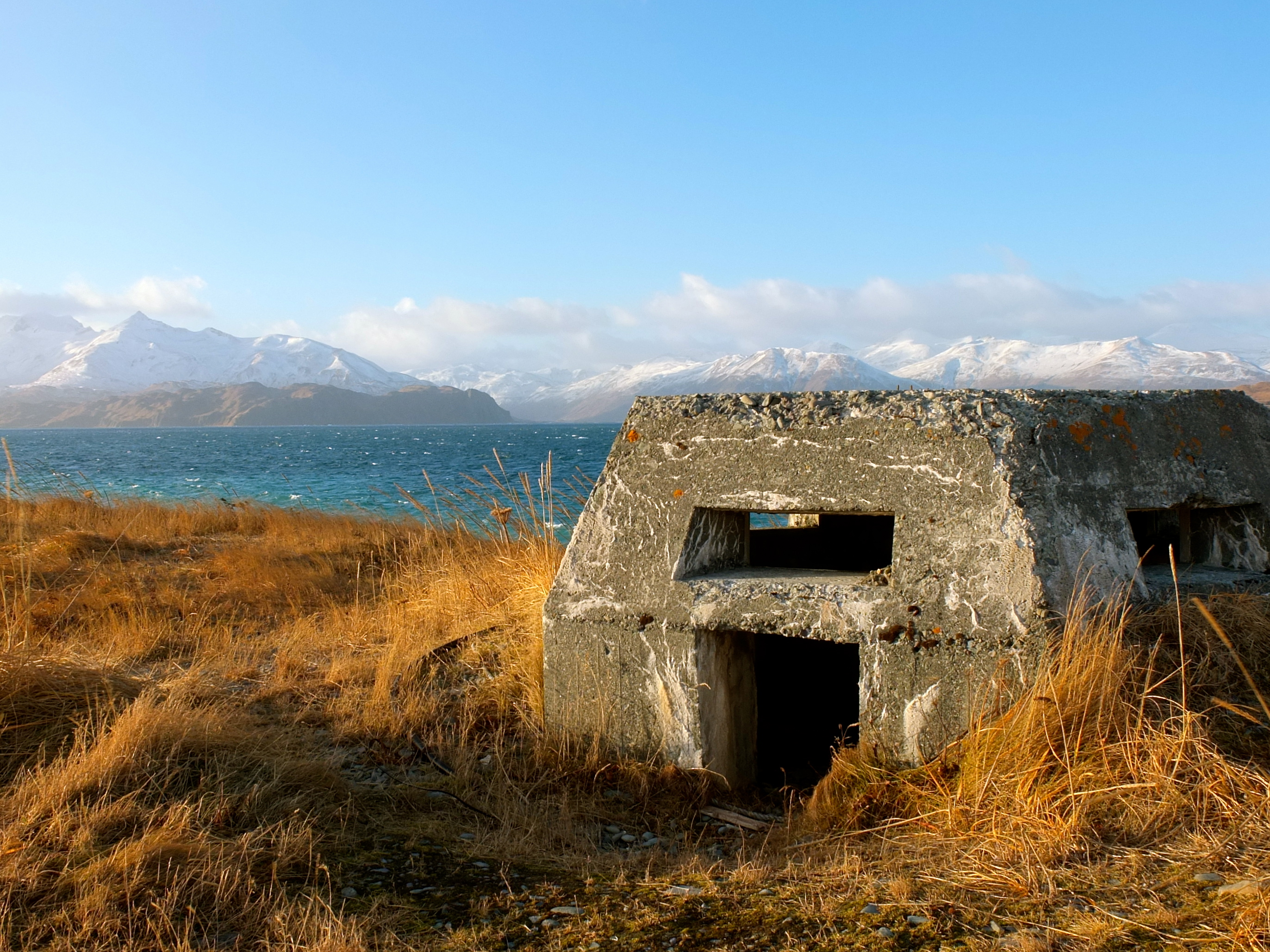
- A World War II bunker abandoned in Dutch Harbor, Amaknak Island

- Location within the U.S. state of Alaska
- Coordinates: 52°09′47″N 174°17′06″W
- Country: United States
- State: Alaska
- Established: October 23, 1987
- Named for: Aleutian Islands
- Largest city: Unalaska

Area
  - Total: 14,116 sq mi (36,560 km^{2})
  - Land: 4,390 sq mi (11,400 km^{2})
  - Water: 9,726 sq mi (25,190 km^{2}) 68.9%

Population (2020)
  - Total: 5,232
  - Estimate (2025): 5,240 ▲
  - Density: 1.27/sq mi (0.49/km^{2})
- Time zones: UTC−9 (Alaska)
  - Summer (DST): UTC−8 (ADT)
- UTC−10 (Hawaii–Aleutian)
  - Summer (DST): UTC−9 (HADT)
- Congressional district: At-large

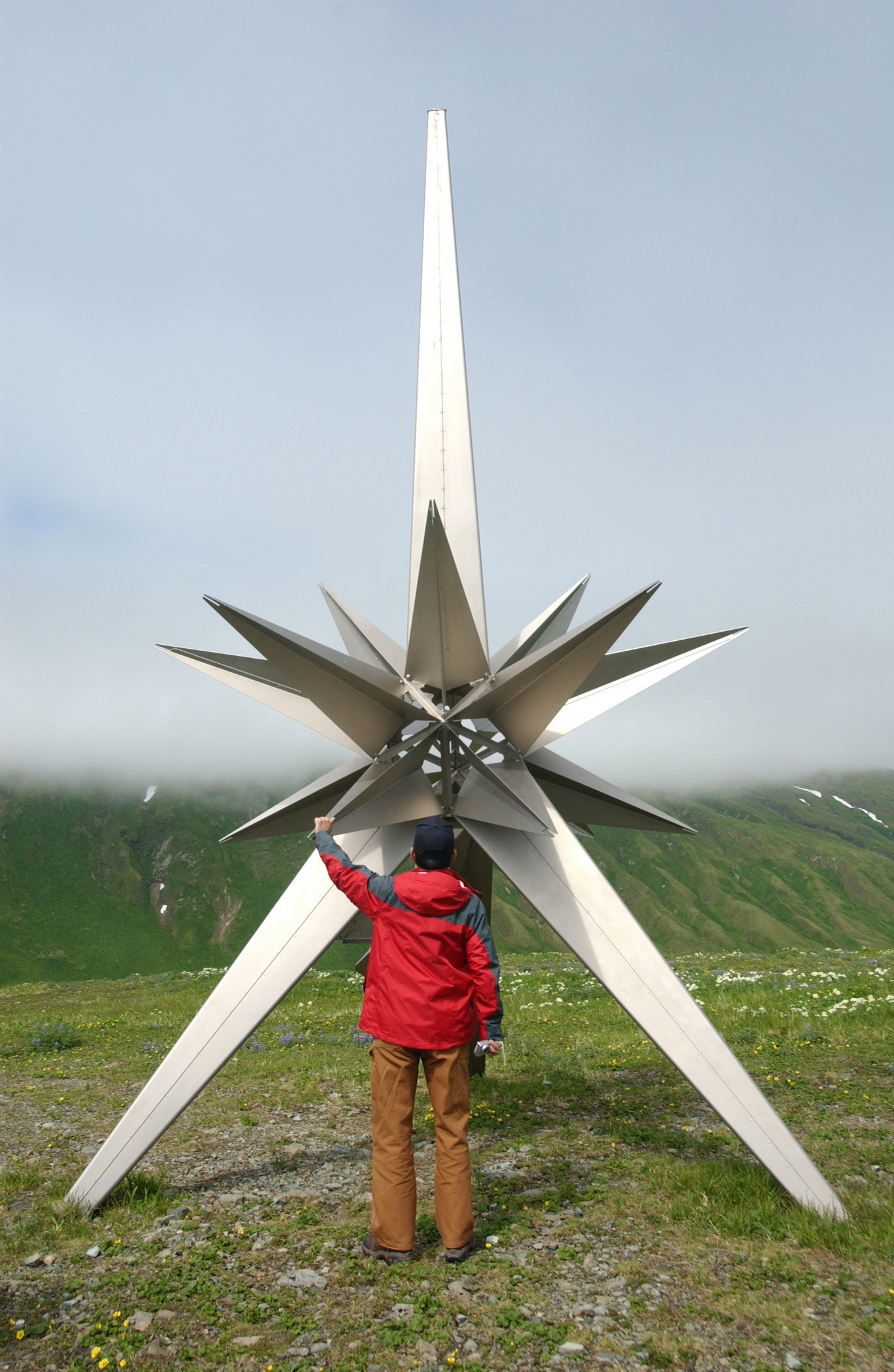
The "Peace Monument" on Attu Island

Aleutians West Census Area (Russian: Западные Алеутские острова) is a census area located in the U.S. state of Alaska. As of the 2020 census, the population was 5,232, down from 5,561 in 2010.

It is part of the Unorganized Borough and therefore has no borough seat. Its largest city is Unalaska, home to about 80% of the population. It contains most of the Aleutian Islands, from Attu Island in the west to Unalaska Island in the east, as well as the Pribilof Islands, which lie north of the Aleutians in the Bering Sea.

== Geography ==
According to the U.S. Census Bureau, the census area has a total area of 14,116 square miles (36,560 km^{2}), of which 4,390 square miles (11,400 km^{2}) is land and 9,726 square miles (25,190 km^{2}) (68.9%) is water. It borders the Aleutians East Borough to the east.

=== National protected areas ===
- Alaska Maritime National Wildlife Refuge (part of the Aleutian Islands and Bering Sea units)
  - Aleutian Islands Wilderness (part)
  - Bogoslof Wilderness
  - Pribilof Islands
- Aleutian World War II National Historic Area

=== Cape ===
- Moss Point

== Demographics ==
Historical population
Census	Pop.	Note	%±
1960	6,011		—
1970	8,057		34.0%
1980	7,768		−3.6%
1990	9,478		22.0%
2000	5,465		−42.3%
2010	5,561		1.8%
2020	5,232		−5.9%
2025 (est.)	5,240	▲	0.2%
U.S. Decennial Census; 1790-1960 1900-1990; 1990-2000 2010-2020

A 2014 analysis by The Atlantic found the Aleutians West Census Area to be the most racially diverse county-equivalent in the United States. According to the Brookings Institution, Asian Americans are the largest population of color in the census area, a majority of which are Filipino Americans.

=== 2020 census ===
As of the 2020 census, the census area had a population of 5,232. The median age was 38.7 years. 12.5% of residents were under the age of 18 and 5.8% of residents were 65 years of age or older. For every 100 females there were 190.7 males, and for every 100 females age 18 and over there were 210.9 males age 18 and over.

The racial makeup of the census area was 31.9% White, 5.0% Black or African American, 13.9% American Indian and Alaska Native, 28.9% Asian, 4.6% Native Hawaiian and Pacific Islander, 8.6% from some other race, and 7.1% from two or more races. Hispanic or Latino residents of any race comprised 12.8% of the population.

0.0% of residents lived in urban areas, while 100.0% lived in rural areas.

There were 902 households in the census area, of which 37.6% had children under the age of 18 living with them and 21.3% had a female householder with no spouse or partner present. About 32.7% of all households were made up of individuals and 8.1% had someone living alone who was 65 years of age or older.

There were 1,331 housing units, of which 32.2% were vacant. Among occupied housing units, 40.4% were owner-occupied and 59.6% were renter-occupied. The homeowner vacancy rate was 1.4% and the rental vacancy rate was 19.4%.

Top 10 Most Self-Reported Detailed Ancestries in Aleutians West Census Area (2020 United States Census)
Ancestry	% of Population
Filipino	26.8%
Mexican	8.2%
Aleut	7.6%
Ukrainian	4.1%
German	4%
Irish	3.9%
Samoan	3.8%
English	3.6%
Serbian	2.8%
Qawalangin Tribe of Unalaska	2.4%

=== 2020 census ===
Aleutians West Census Area, Alaska – Racial and ethnic composition Note: the US Census treats Hispanic/Latino as an ethnic category. This table excludes Latinos from the racial categories and assigns them to a separate category. Hispanics/Latinos may be of any race.
Race / Ethnicity (NH = Non-Hispanic)	Pop 1990	Pop 2000	Pop 2010	Pop 2020	% 1990	% 2000	% 2010	% 2020
White alone (NH)	6,130	2,059	1,745	1,585	64.68%	37.68%	31.38%	30.29%
Black or African American alone (NH)	635	165	318	257	6.70%	3.02%	5.72%	4.91%
Native American or Alaska Native alone (NH)	1,066	1,136	841	709	11.25%	20.79%	15.12%	13.55%
Asian alone (NH)	898	1,338	1,575	1,502	9.47%	24.48%	28.32%	28.71%
Native Hawaiian or Pacific Islander alone (NH)	x	33	102	238	x	0.60%	1.83%	4.55%
Other race alone (NH)	7	4	5	10	0.07%	0.07%	0.09%	0.19%
Mixed race or Multiracial (NH)	x	157	249	263	x	2.87%	4.48%	5.03%
Hispanic or Latino (any race)	742	573	726	668	7.83%	10.48%	13.06%	12.77%
Total	9,478	5,465	5,561	5,232	100.00%	100.00%	100.00%	100.00%

=== 2000 census ===
At the 2000 census, there were 5,465 people, 1,270 households, and 736 families residing in the census area. The population density was 1.24 people per square mile (0.48 people/km^{2}). There were 2,234 housing units at an average density of 0.51 per square mile (0.20/km^{2}).

The racial makup of the census area was 40.04% White, 3.02% Black or African American, 20.95% Native American, 24.59% Asian, 0.62% Pacific Islander, 7.32% from other races, and 3.46% from two or more races. 10.48%. were Hispanic or Latino of any race. 13.89% reported speaking Tagalog at home, while 11.22% spoke Spanish, 5.97% Aleut, and 4.51% Vietnamese.

Of the 1,270 households 35.40% had children under the age of 18 living with them, 44.00% were married couples living together, 7.60% had a female householder with no husband present, and 42.00% were non-families. 32.00% of households were one person and 2.10% were one person aged 65 or older. The average household size was 2.52 and the average family size was 3.26.

The age distribution was 17.20% under the age of 18, 7.80% from 18 to 24, 47.60% from 25 to 44, 25.10% from 45 to 64, and 2.30% 65 or older. The median age was 36 years. For every 100 females, there were 180.00 males. For every 100 females age 18 and over, there were 202.10 males.

== Communities ==
The largest community in the Aleutians West Census Area is the city of Unalaska.

=== Cities ===
- Adak
- Atka
- St. George
- St. Paul
- Unalaska

=== Census-designated places ===
- Attu Station
- Eareckson Station
- Nikolski

== Politics and government ==
United States presidential election results for Aleutians West Census Area, Alaska
Year	Republican		Democratic		Third party(ies)	
Year	No.	%	No.	%	No.	%
1960	90	28.57%	225	71.43%	0	0.00%
1964	38	10.76%	315	89.24%	0	0.00%
1968	188	50.13%	165	44.00%	22	5.87%
1972	371	64.97%	177	31.00%	23	4.03%
1976	379	59.03%	232	36.14%	31	4.83%
1980	478	48.73%	341	34.76%	162	16.51%
1984	850	65.99%	413	32.07%	25	1.94%
1988	1,241	66.51%	580	31.08%	45	2.41%
1992	803	37.56%	687	32.13%	648	30.31%
1996	528	38.88%	598	44.04%	232	17.08%
2000	704	51.20%	514	37.38%	157	11.42%
2004	508	51.00%	455	45.68%	33	3.31%
2008	685	49.71%	648	47.02%	45	3.27%
2012	426	34.38%	778	62.79%	35	2.82%
2016	403	32.84%	699	56.97%	125	10.19%
2020	557	44.07%	675	53.40%	32	2.53%
2024	469	48.30%	474	48.82%	28	2.88%

At the federal level, the Aleutians West Census Area is part of Alaska's at-large congressional district along with the rest of the state. The census area is represented by Lyman Hoffman (D) in the Alaska Senate and by Bryce Edgmon (D) in the Alaska House of Representatives. In presidential elections, it has consistently backed Democrats since 2012, although Kamala Harris won the borough by five votes in 2024.

== Education ==
School districts within the census area are: Aleutian Region School District, Pribilof School District, and Unalaska City School District.

== See also ==
- List of airports in Alaska
- National Register of Historic Places listings in Aleutians West Census Area, Alaska
