= St. Paul Island Airport =

Airport serving Saint Paul Island, Alaska, United States

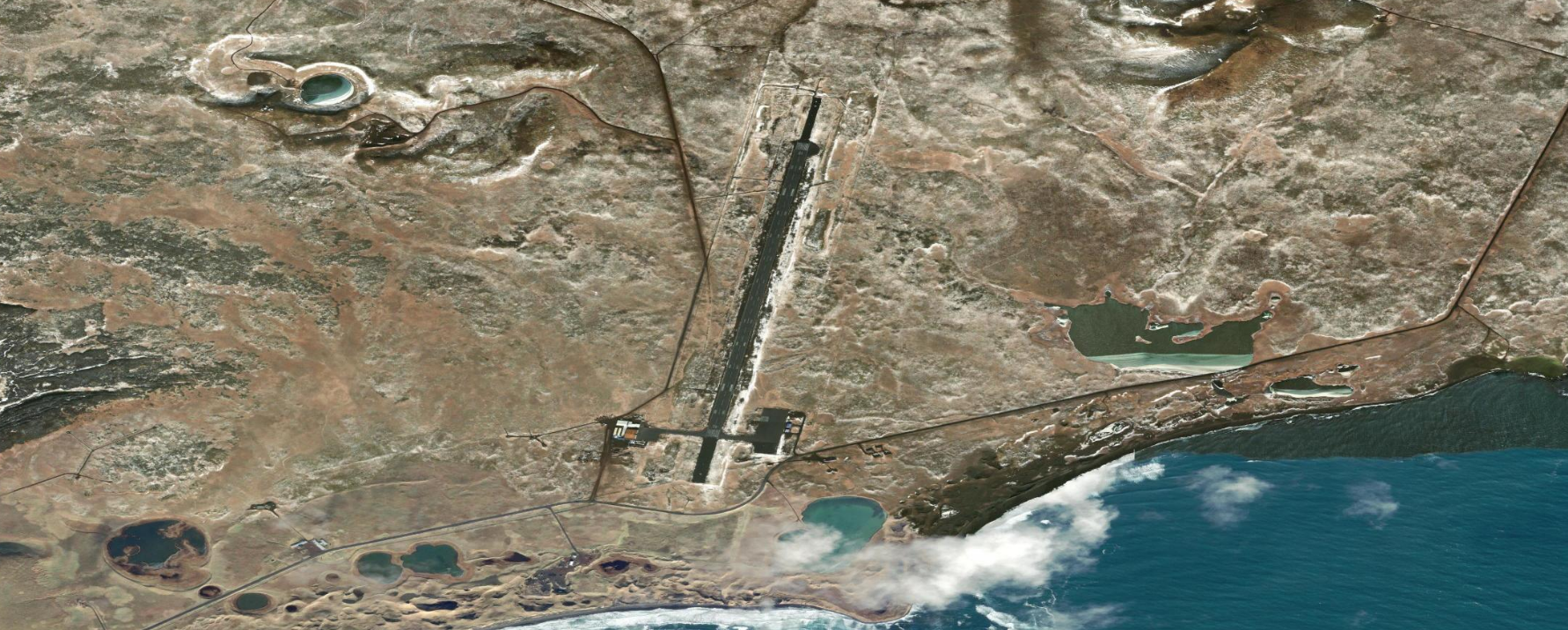
- IATA: SNP; ICAO: PASN; FAA LID: SNP

Summary
- Airport type: Public
- Owner: Alaska DOT&PF - Central Region
- Serves: St. Paul Island, Alaska
- Location: St. Paul, Alaska
- Elevation AMSL: 63 ft (19 m)
- Coordinates: 57°10′02″N 170°13′14″W

Map
- Location of airport in Alaska

Runways
Direction	Length		Surface
Direction	ft	m	Surface
18/36	6,500	1,981	Asphalt

Statistics (2006)
- Aircraft operations: 410
- Enplanements (2008): 3,301
- Source: Federal Aviation Administration

St. Paul Island Airport (IATA: SNP, ICAO: PASN, FAA LID: SNP) is a state-owned, public-use airport located on St. Paul Island in the Aleutians West Census Area of the U.S. state of Alaska. It is situated near the city of St. Paul, the island's main settlement.

As per Federal Aviation Administration records, this airport had 3,301 commercial passenger boardings (enplanements) in calendar year 2008, an increase of 8% from the 3,064 enplanements in 2007. St. Paul Island Airport is included in the FAA's National Plan of Integrated Airport Systems (2009–2013), which categorizes it as a general aviation facility.

== Facilities and aircraft ==
St. Paul Island Airport has one runway designated 18/36 with an asphalt surface measuring 6,500 by 150 feet (1,981 x 46 m). For the 12-month period ending December 31, 2006, the airport had 410 aircraft operations, an average of 34 per month: 63% air taxi, 24% military and 12% general aviation.

== Airline and destinations ==
Airlines	Destinations
Aleutian Airways	Anchorage
Grant Aviation	Cold Bay, St. George, Unalaska/Dutch Harbor

== See also ==
- List of airports in Alaska
