= Pavel Lebedev-Lastochkin =

18th-century Russian merchant and explorer

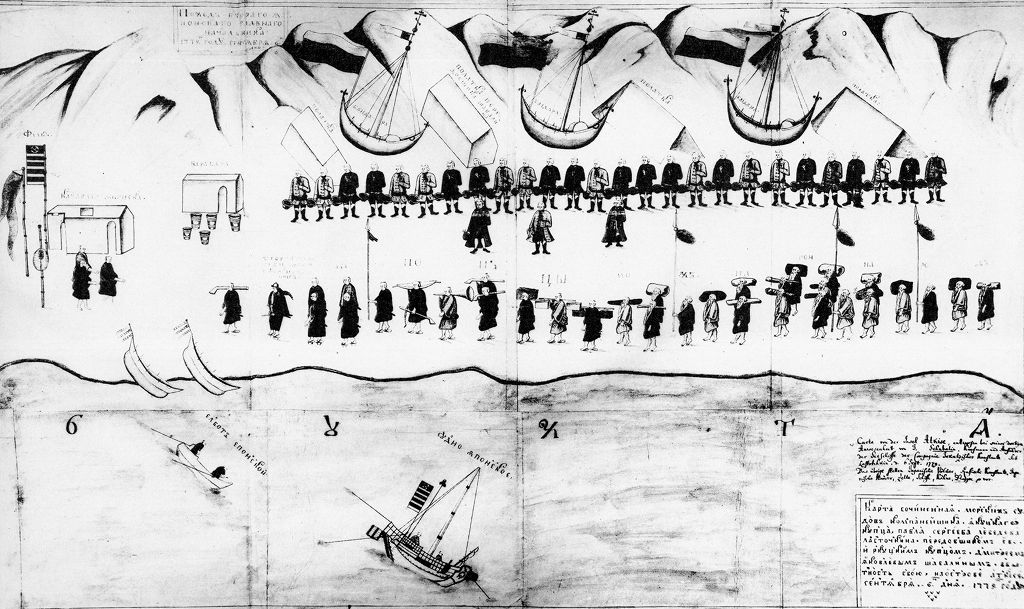
The Russians of Pavel Lebedev-Lastochkin, with their ships tossed inland by the tsunami, meeting Japanese in 1779

Pavel Sergeyevich Lebedev-Lastochkin (Russian: Павел Сергеевич Лебедев-Ласточкин) was a Russian merchant from Yakutsk who, in the late 18th century, became one of the first Russians to make contact with the Japanese. The government had hoped to enlist the efforts of private merchants, to help them open Japan at far less cost to the government than if they had sent official emissaries or military.

Lastochkin volunteered for the mission, seeking the profits from either Japanese trade goods or furs from Hokkaidō. His first attempt failed entirely when his ship sank in the Sea of Okhotsk. But he, along with another merchant named Grigory Shelikhov, was granted trade monopoly over the Kuril Islands (a string of islands extending north from Japan to Siberia). The plan was to sail to Uruppu, one of the islands, with an expedition crew and about 40 settlers. They would set up a small colony town near Uruppu, and try to persuade some Ainu to guide them down to Japan. This second expedition failed as well when, after reaching Uruppu in the summer of 1775, the ship sank in a storm.

Lastochkin tried yet again, this time bringing a number of extra ships. It was now 1778, and the expedition met with the Lords of Matsumae clan, the Japanese guardians of the northern borders, for the first time. They bestowed gifts upon the samurai lords, and asked to trade. The samurai informed Lastochkin's party that they did not have the authority to make such agreements on behalf of the shōgun, but that they should return the following year. When he did Lastochkin's gifts were returned and he was forbidden to return to Hokkaido, and informed that he should inquire at Nagasaki, on the southern island of Kyūshū, and inconveniently far from Russian holdings, if he wished to trade. Latoschkin returned to Uruppu to plan his next move.

In 1779, an earthquake caused a massive tsunami, which tossed the Russian ship some distance inland. This finally convinced Latoschkin to give up on seeking trade with Japan. However, despite his failure to 'open' Japan to trade, he was still one of the first, if not the very first, Russian to meet Japanese, in Japan, in any official capacity.

== See also ==
- Empire of Japan–Russian Empire relations
