= Unalaska Airport =

Unalaska Airport Dutch Harbor Airport
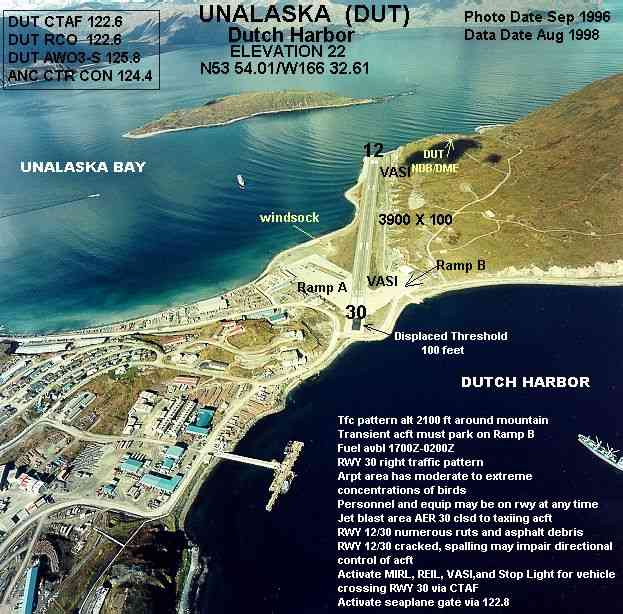
- IATA: DUT; ICAO: PADU; FAA LID: DUT

Summary
- Airport type: Public
- Owner: State of Alaska DOT&PF - Central Region
- Serves: Unalaska, Alaska
- Location: Amaknak Island
- Elevation AMSL: 9.6 ft / 3 m
- Coordinates: 53°53′56″N 166°32′42″W

Map
- Location of airport in Alaska

Runways
Direction	Length		Surface
Direction	ft	m	Surface
13/31	4,500	1,372	Asphalt

Statistics (2007)
- Aircraft operations: 1,295
- Based aircraft: 4
- Source: Federal Aviation Administration

Tom Madsen (Dutch Harbor) Airport (IATA: DUT, ICAO: PADU, FAA LID: DUT) is a state-owned public-use airport in the City of Unalaska, on Amaknak Island in the Aleutian Islands, off the coast of the U.S. state of Alaska. It is located near the Bering Sea coast of Unalaska Island, 800 miles (1,300 km) southwest of Anchorage and 1,950 miles (3,140 km) from Seattle.

The official name of the City of Unalaska's port is Dutch Harbor. That name is also applied to the portion of Unalaska on Amaknak Island, which is located across a bridge from the rest of the city on Unalaska Island. Therefore, the airport is sometimes referred to as Dutch Harbor Airport. In 2002, the State of Alaska renamed it Tom Madsen Airport in honor of Charles Thomas Madsen Sr., a bush pilot who was killed in an airplane accident that year. However, the Federal Aviation Administration still refers to it as Unalaska Airport.

Scheduled commercial airline service was provided by PenAir, a code share partner of Alaska Airlines until October 2019, and prior to that Alaska Airlines operated Boeing 737-200 Combi jetliners to the airport with these aircraft transporting a combination of passengers and freight on the main deck of the aircraft. However, due to load restrictions as a result of the short runway as well as cancellations due to weather, Alaska Airlines then contracted the service via a code sharing arrangement to PenAir in 2004. PenAir initially operated Saab 340 and then Saab 2000 regional turboprop aircraft into the airport. PenAir went into bankruptcy in 2019 and its assets, including aircraft were acquired by Ravn Alaska, and one of the Saab 2000 formerly operated by PenAir was involved in a fatal accident on October 17, 2019, which resulted in the end of PenAir operating Alaska Airlines code sharing service. Ravn Alaska is now serving the airport using de Havilland Canada DHC-8 Dash 8 aircraft, but without the involvement of Alaska Airlines. AirPac also previously served the airport with British Aerospace BAe 146-100 jets with this aircraft type having enhanced short runway takeoff and landing performance and in 1986 was operating direct, no change of plane jet service to Seattle via stops in Anchorage and Sitka. The airfield runway is 4,500 feet long which is quite short for jet operations when compared with typical runways normally used by mainline jet aircraft. Other airlines that served the airport in the past included MarkAir operating Boeing 737-200 Combi jet aircraft and Reeve Aleutian Airways flying Lockheed L-188 Electra turboprops via a code sharing agreement with Alaska Airlines. In 1975, Reeve Aleutian was independently operating NAMC YS-11 turboprops into the airport with service to and from Anchorage three days a week.

As per Federal Aviation Administration records, the airport had 28,234 passenger boardings (enplanements) in calendar year 2008, 26,705 enplanements in 2009, and 26,711 in 2010. It is included in the National Plan of Integrated Airport Systems for 2011–2015, which categorized it as a primary commercial service airport (more than 10,000 enplanements per year).

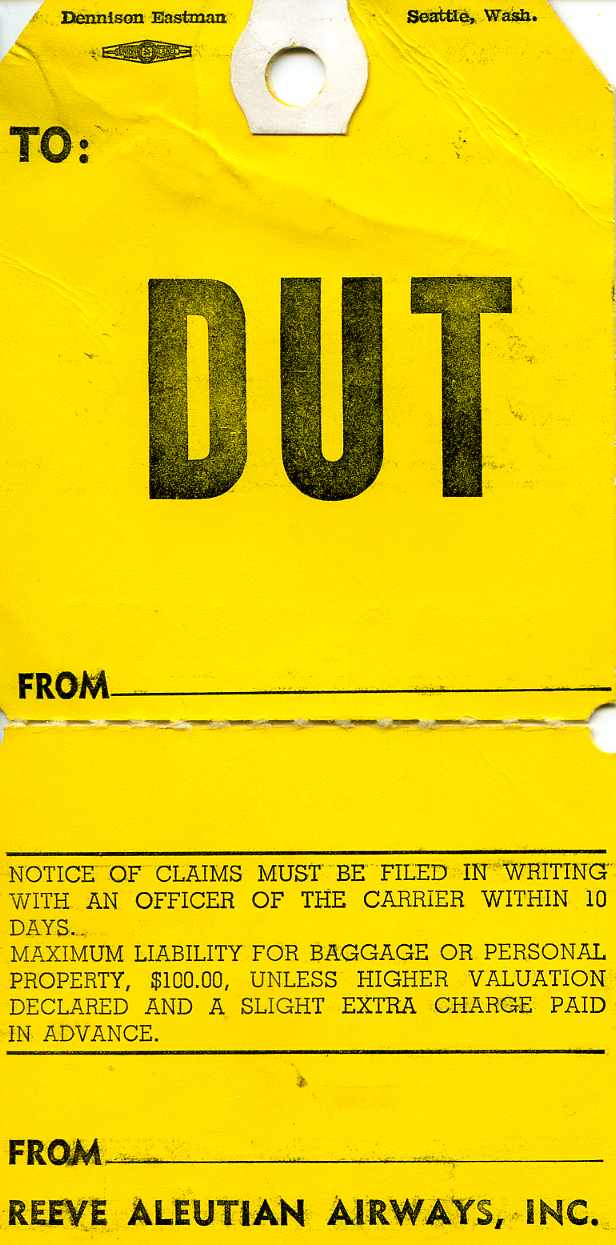
DUT bag tag for a 1972 flight on Reeve Aleutian Airways

== Facilities and aircraft ==
Unalaska Airport has one runway designated 13/31 with an asphalt surface measuring 4,500 by 100 feet (1,372 x 30 m). There is a microwave landing system (MLS) approach. The airport's runway is bordered on one side by a steep drop off into the ocean and the side of a hill on the other. Both ends drop off into open water.

For the 12-month period ending December 31, 2007, the airport had 1,295 aircraft operations, an average of 25 per week: 85% scheduled commercial, 8% air taxi, 4% general aviation, and 4% military. At that time there were four aircraft based at this airport: 75% multi-engine and 25% ultralight.

== Airlines and destinations ==
=== Passenger ===
The following airlines offer scheduled passenger service at this airport:

Airlines	Destinations
Aleutian Airways	Anchorage
Grant Aviation	Akutan, Atka, Cold Bay, Nikolski, St. George, St. Paul

=== Cargo ===
The following air carrier operates air cargo flights from the airport:

Airlines	Destinations
Alaska Central Express	Anchorage, Cold Bay

== Incidents and accidents ==
- On October 17, 2019, PenAir flight 3296, a Saab 2000 turboprop operating from Anchorage to Unalaska and codeshared by Alaska Airlines, went off the runway on landing; one passenger died. All scheduled flights to Dutch Harbor were subsequently suspended, and Alaska Airlines said that it would not place its code on any Saab 2000 flights into Dutch Harbor until the airline reviewed the National Transportation Safety Board preliminary report.

== Media appearances ==
Unalaska Airport is the base for the "Dutch Harbor Approach" mission supplied with Microsoft Flight Simulator X, as well as the "Aleutian Cargo Run" mission in the Deluxe Edition.

The airport has been featured in the Discovery Channel series Deadliest Catch.

== See also ==
- List of airports in Alaska
