= Pribilof Islands =

Group of volcanic islands off the southwest coast of mainland Alaska, United States

Coordinates: 56°50′N 170°00′W

Location in Alaska

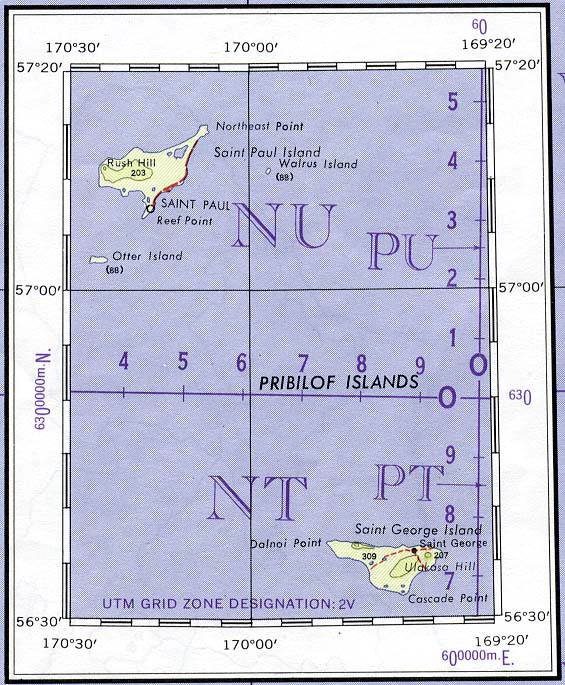
Map of the Pribilof Islands

The Pribilof Islands (formerly the Northern Fur Seal Islands; Aleut: Amix̂, Russian: Острова Прибылова, romanized: Ostrova Pribylova) are a group of four volcanic islands off the coast of mainland Alaska, in the Bering Sea, about 200 miles (320 km) north of Unalaska and 200 miles (320 km) southwest of Cape Newenham. The islands are part of the Alaska Maritime National Wildlife Refuge. The Siberian coast is roughly 500 miles (800 km) northwest. About 75 square miles (194 km^{2}) in total area, they are mostly rocky and are covered with tundra, with a population of 572 as of the 2010 census.

== Principal islands ==
The Principal islands are Saint Paul and Saint George. The former was named for the Feast of Saints Peter and Paul, on the day of which the island was first encountered by the Russian explorer Gavriil Pribylov; the latter was probably named for the ship sailed by Pribylov. The Otter and Walrus islets are near St. Paul. The total land area of all the islands is 75.072 sq mi (194.44 km^{2}). The islands are part of the Bering Sea unit of the Alaska Maritime National Wildlife Refuge.

== History ==
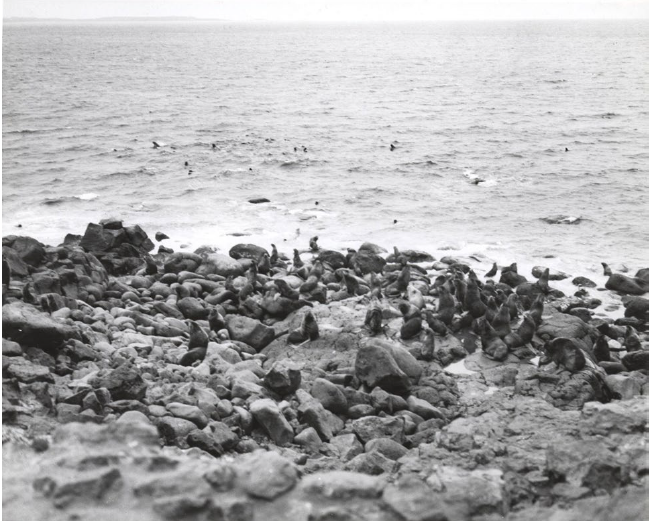
Fur seals in a rookery in the Pribilof Islands in the 1950s

Despite being about 200 miles north of the closest Aleutian island, oral traditions of the Aleut people indicate that the islands were known but sparingly visited and not permanently inhabited, as "no ethnohistoric or archaeological evidence points to the use or occupation of the Pribilof Islands... by any native people before the Russian period in Alaska."

=== Seal fur trade ===
The first European account of the islands is attributed to an employee of the Lebedev-Lastochkin Company, Gavriil Pribylov, who located St. George Island in 1786 while searching for the breeding grounds of northern fur seals. St. Paul Island was reached the following year. Seals swam north through the Aleutian Islands and returned in the autumn with newly born pups. The rookeries Pribylov visited held upwards of four million seals, for which they became famous. The islands became the site of the LLC's first artel in what later became Russian America.

After Russian discovery, the islands became a major center of the northern fur seal trade. With the creation of the Russian-American Company, a monopoly, Russian operations continued on the islands. Aleutians were brought by the Russians to the islands to work in the seal harvest, forming the basis of the islands’ permanent communities.

The United States acquired the islands along with the entirety of Alaska in 1867. Shortly after the Americans set the islands aside as a seal reservation in 1869, and leased sealing rights to the Alaska Commercial Company in 1870. From 1890 through 1910, the North American Commercial Company held the monopoly on seal-hunting there, but the industry shrank considerably owing to seal-hunting on the open sea. Overhunting gradually led to regulations and international agreements, such as the North Pacific Fur Seal Convention of 1911, which was signed by the United Kingdom, Japan, Russia, and the United States to restrict hunting in the area. Under the Fur Seal Act of 1966, seal hunting was forbidden in the Pribilofs, with the exception of subsistence hunting by native Aleuts.

=== Seal Island Historic District ===
Naturalist and paleontologist Roy Chapman Andrews visited the islands in 1913 aboard the schooner Adventuress on her maiden voyage with John Borden and crew. His films of fur seals led to efforts to protect the animals. The buildings on St. George and St. Paul Islands related to the hunting of the northern fur seal make up the national historic district.

=== Twentieth century ===
In 1942, U.S. authorities evacuated the Aleutian residents from St. Paul and St. George due to Japanese attacks on the Aleutian islands. The populations were sent to Funter Bay in Southeast Alaska, where they faced meager conditions in internment camps. Congress later addressed the wartime removal and losses through the Aleutian and Pribilof Islands Restitution provisions of the Civil Liberties Act of 1988, as well as the Aleut Restitution Act of 1988.

A post office was established for the Pribilofs in 1948 at St. Paul, with Mrs. Ruth Anderson as postmistress.

Ambrose Bierce suggested in The Devil's Dictionary that the island should adopt as its motto 'locus sigilli' ("Place of the Seal (emblem)").

=== Today ===
Residents are concentrated in the towns of St. Paul and St. George, each on the island of the same name. Many of the residents of the islands are related. St. Paul and St. George each have small airports; air service is provided from the Alaskan mainland.

St. Paul has a population of 413 (2020 census), with its economy heavily dependent on the annual taking of the snow crab and on subsistence and commercial halibut harvests. Support services to commercial fleets plying the waters of the Bering Sea also contribute to the economy. The balance of economic activity on the island relates to working for the United States Government. The U.S. Coast Guard maintains a base on St. Paul, but no longer maintains a Loran-C master station, as Loran has been replaced by satellite navigation. The National Weather Service has a station on the island, and the National Oceanic and Atmospheric Administration maintains a presence. St. George has a population of 102. Its economy is similar to that of St. Paul.

The Pribilof Islands are a birdwatching attraction, home to many species that do not fly in North America beyond Alaska. More than 210 species have been identified, and an estimated two million seabirds nest there annually. St. Paul is particularly popular, having a high cliff wall, known as Ridge Wall, above the Bering Sea.

== See also ==
- Harrison Gray Otis, chief government agent in 1879
- Seal Island, an Oscar-winning documentary short film about the seals that come to the Pribilof Islands for mating season
