= Glory of Russia Cape =

Cape in Alaska, USA

Coordinates: 60°35′56″N 172°56′34″W

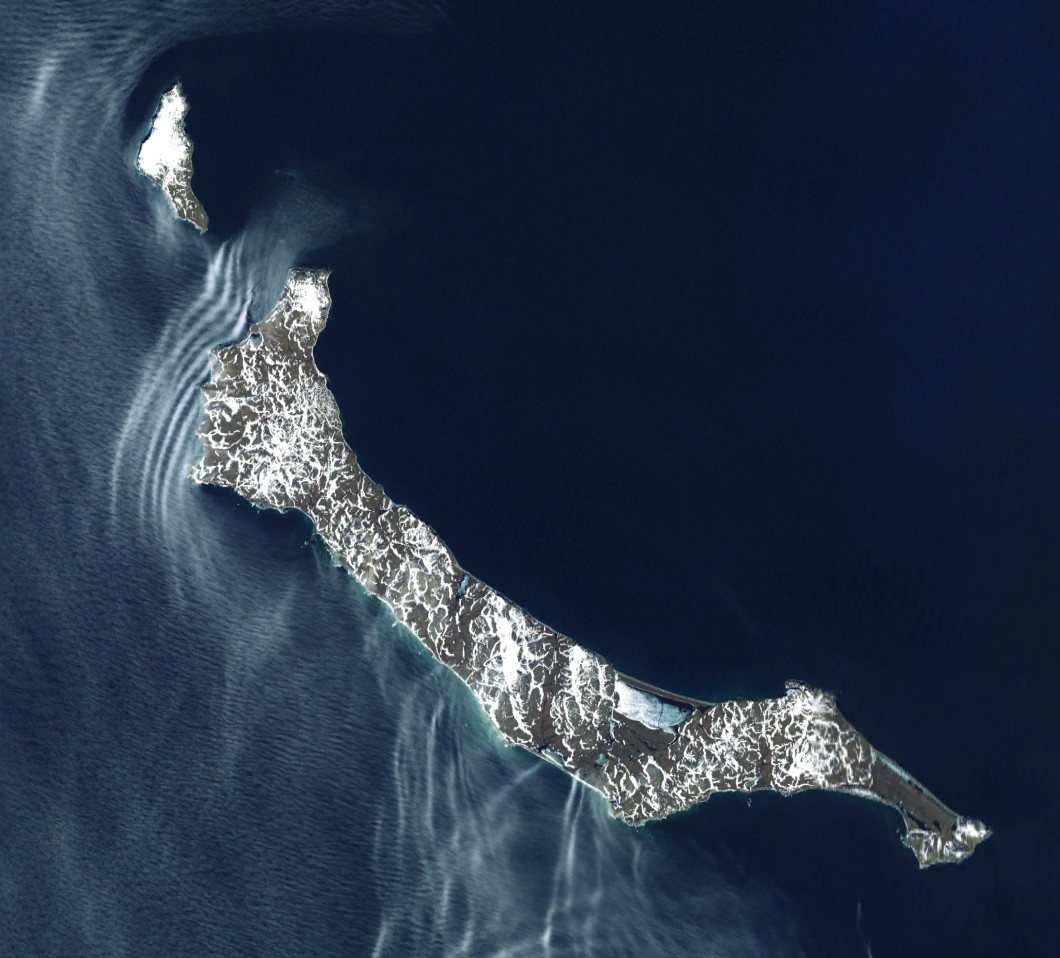
Satellite view of St. Matthew Island

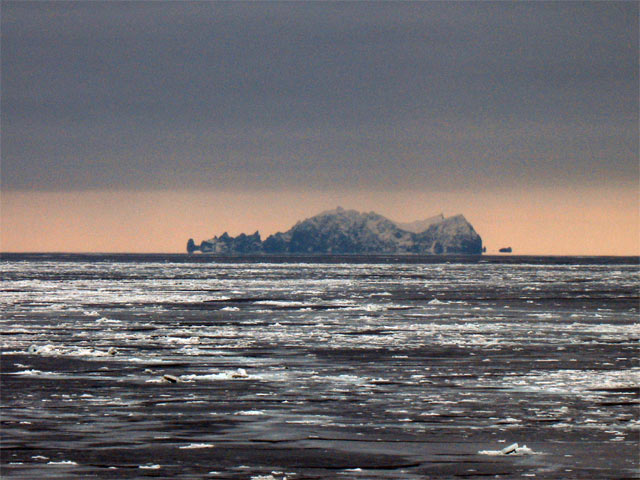
View of Saint Matthew Island from north, with Glory of Russia Cape on the right

Glory of Russia Cape is the northernmost point of St. Matthew Island in the Bering Sea in the US state of Alaska. The cape is hilly, with the peak 1.3 miles (2.1 km) south of the cape being 1,475 feet (450 m) high, while at its coastline the cape is 5 m above mean sea level.

The nearest town is Nash Harbor in the Bethel Census Area, about 414 miles (666 km) away. The St. Paul Island Airport is the nearest airport and heliport to the cape, about 234 miles (377 km) away.

All of St. Matthew Island lies under the management control of the Alaska Maritime National Wildlife Refuge, an area of significant phytogeographic interest for its diverse lichens. The island has a length of 22 miles (35 km) and a width of 2–3 miles (3.2–4.8 km) diverging towards the north, and lies 220 miles (350 km) west of the mainland of Alaska. It is part of a bird sanctuary, which was established in February 1909 and is known as the Bering Sea Reservation. The hills of the isolated island rise to about 1,800 feet (550 m) height and are covered with moss and lichen. Little auks (Alle alle), birds usually found in the North Atlantic, were sighted in auklet colonies near the Glory of Russia Cape from 12 to 24 June 1983.

The cape was named by Russian polar explorer and hydrographer Gavril Sarychev in honor of the ship Glory of Russia. The cape, a promontory, was probably also named “M[ys] Slavy (Slava) Rossii” meaning “Cape Glory of Russia” by the Russian Hydrographic Department (Chart 1427) in 1849 for Lt. Sarichev’s ship, which was moored here on 14 July 1791.

The 8,105-ton Greek ship Milos Reefer, 485 feet (148 m) in length, was wrecked at Glory of Russia Cape on 15 November 1989.
