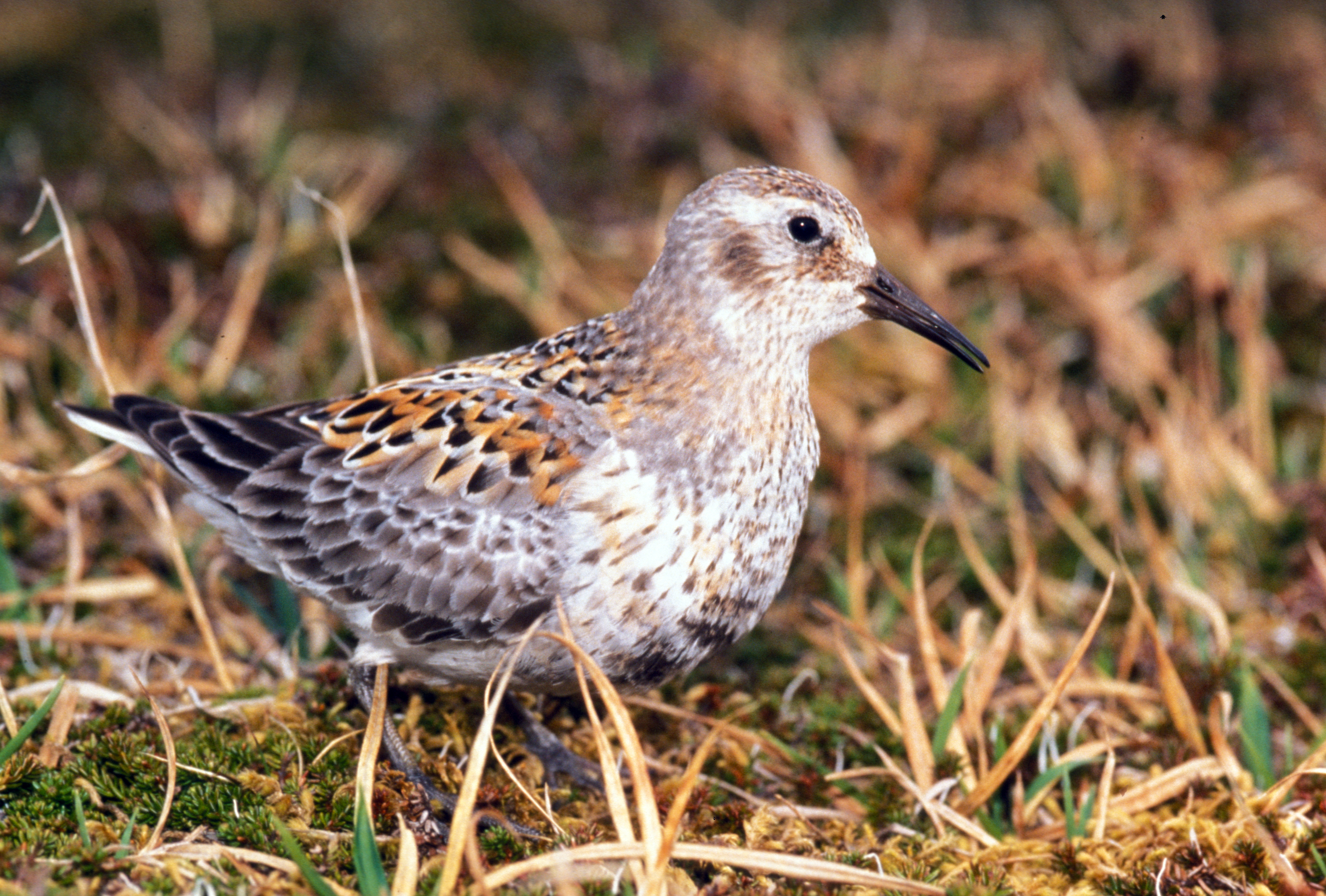

Conservation status
- Least Concern (IUCN 3.1)

Scientific classification
- Kingdom: Animalia
- Phylum: Chordata
- Class: Aves
- Order: Charadriiformes
- Family: Scolopacidae
- Genus: Calidris
- Species: C. ptilocnemis

Binomial name
- Calidris ptilocnemis (Coues, 1873)
- Breeding Year-round Nonbreeding

Synonyms
- Erolia ptilocnemis

= Rock sandpiper =

Species of bird

The rock sandpiper (Calidris ptilocnemis) is a small shorebird in the sandpiper family Scolopacidae. This is a hardy sandpiper that breeds in the arctic and subarctic regions of Alaska and the Chukotka and Kamchatka Peninsulas. It is closely related to the purple sandpiper that breeds in arctic regions of northeast Canada and the northwest Palearctic, and in the past was often considered conspecific with it.

== Taxonomy ==
The rock sandpiper was formally described in 1873 by the American ornithologist Elliott Coues and given the binomial name Tringa ptilocnemis. It was formerly sometimes placed in the genus Erolia, but is now placed with 23 other sandpipers in the genus Calidris that was introduced in 1804 by the German naturalist Blasius Merrem. The genus name is from Ancient Greek kalidris or skalidris, a term used by Aristotle for some grey-coloured waterside birds. The specific epithet ptilocnemis combines the Ancient Greek ptilon meaning "feather" with knēmē meaning "leg". Within the genus Calidris the rock sandpiper is sister to the purple sandpiper (Calidris maritima), and next most closely related to the sanderling (Calidris alba) and dunlin (Calidris alpina).

Four subspecies are recognised:

- C. p. tschuktschorum (Portenko, 1937) – breeds on the Chukchi Peninsula and in western Alaska
- C. p. ptilocnemis (Coues, 1873) – breeds on the Pribilof Islands and on Hall and St. Matthew Islands
- C. p. couesi (Ridgeway, 1880) – breeds on the Aleutian Islands and on the Alaskan Peninsula
- C. p. quarta (Hartert, 1920) – breeds on the south of the Kamchatka Peninsula and in the Kuril and Commander Islands

== Description ==
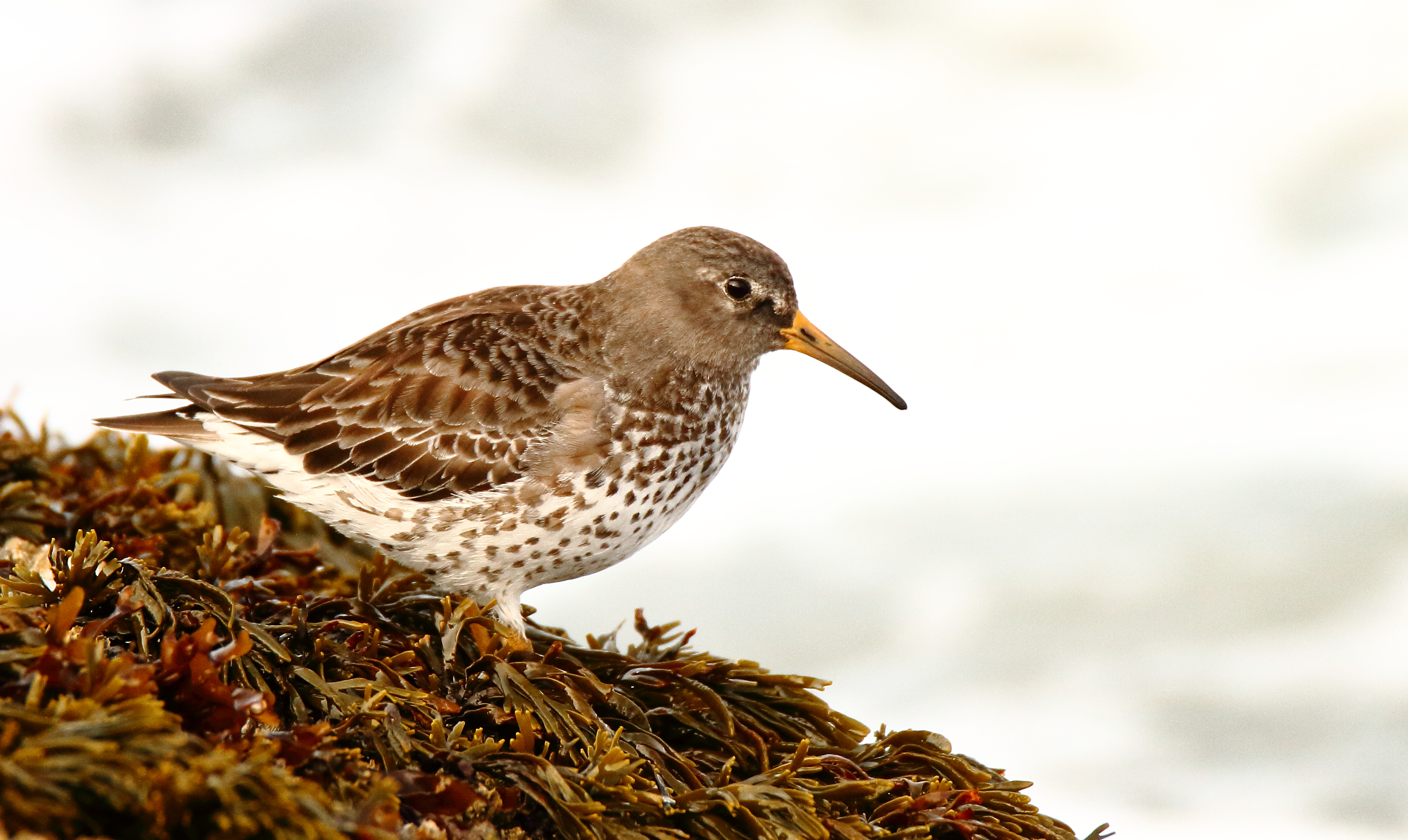
Rock Sandpiper on the Humboldt Bay North Jetty, near Eureka, California

Adults have short yellow legs and a medium thin dark bill. The body is dark on top with a slight purplish gloss and mainly white underneath. The breast is smeared with grey and the rump is black. The nominate subspecies from the Pribilof Islands shows a bold black belly patch in breeding plumage; the other three subspecies more closely resemble purple sandpiper than they do the nominate subspecies.

== Distribution and habitat ==
Birds migrate south to rocky ice-free Pacific coasts in winter. The subspecies leap frog each other for winter, with more northerly breeders passing south of more southerly breeders. It reproduces in tundra habitats, typically favoring drier and more desolate areas with limited vegetation such as lichen, moss, and sparse grasses. It can form rather large wintering flocks.

Rock Sandpipers which spend the non-breeding season in the Pacific Basin, Alaska, have to endure harsh conditions where they rely on high prey quality, especially of their primary prey - the bivalve Macoma balthica.

== Behaviour and ecology ==
=== Breeding ===
Their breeding habitat is the northern tundra on Arctic Pacific coast of Alaska and the Aleutian and Pribilof Islands. The birds also breed in Kamchatka and the Kuril Islands. The breeding pair is usually monogamous, with pair bonds usually lasting several years. They nest on the ground either elevated on rocks or in lower damp location. The male makes several scrapes; the female chooses one and lays 4 eggs. Both male and female take the responsibility for incubation.

=== Diet ===
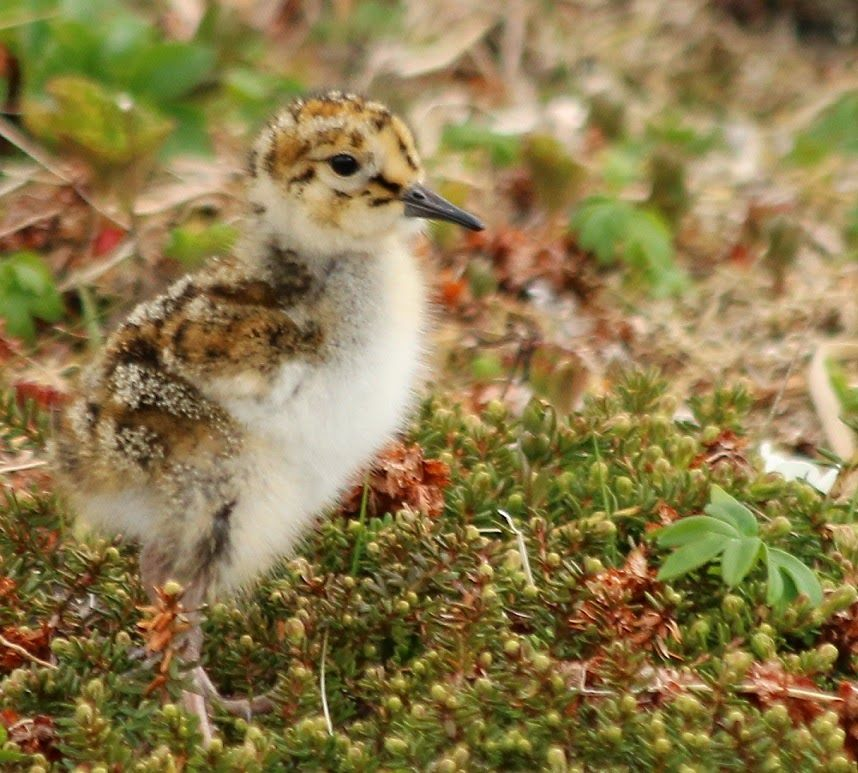
Newly hatched chick

These birds forage on rocky coasts. They mainly eat insects, mollusks, marine worms, also some plant material. It often feeds up to its breast in water, and often swims. It roosts on rocks near its feeding grounds just above the high tide spray.
