= Forrester Island =

Forrester Island may refer to:

- Forrester Island (Alaska)
  - Forrester Island Wilderness
- Forrester Island (Antarctica)
- Foresters Island, Ontario
