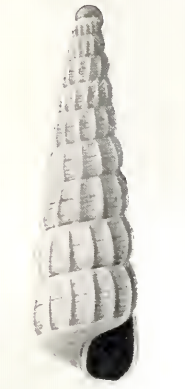
- Drawing of a shell of Turbonilla canadensis

Scientific classification
- Kingdom: Animalia
- Phylum: Mollusca
- Class: Gastropoda
- Family: Pyramidellidae
- Genus: Turbonilla
- Species: T. canadensis

Binomial name
- Turbonilla canadensis Bartsch, 1917

Synonyms
- Turbonilla (Strioturbonilla) canadensis Bartsch, 1917

= Turbonilla canadensis =

Species of gastropod

Turbonilla canadensis is a species of sea snail, a marine gastropod mollusk in the family Pyramidellidae, the pyrams and their allies.

== Description ==
The yellowish white shell is slender and has an elongate-conic shape. Its length measures 6.3 mm. The 2½ whorls of the protoconch are small, and depressed helicoid. Their axis is at right angles to that of the succeeding turns, in the first of which they are about one-fourth immersed. The 11 whorls of the teleoconch are almost flattened, and situated rather high between the sutures. They are appressed at the summit. They are marked by quite regular, slightly curved, protractive, axial ribs, of which 14 occur upon the first, 16 upon the second and third, 18 upon the fourth to seventh, 20 upon the eighth, and 22 upon the ninth and the penultimate turn. The intercostal spaces are not quite as wide as the ribs. They are deeply impressed, terminating at the periphery, which is decidedly angulated. There is a smooth space between the periphery and the succeeding whorl, which falls at some little distance anterior to the periphery of the preceding turn. This gives the whorls a somewhat overhanging appearance. The suture is well constricted. The base of the shell is short, well rounded, its entire surface marked by microscopic striations. The aperture is subquadrate. The posterior angle is obtuse. The outer lip is thin. The inner lip is slightly curved and somewhat revolute.

== Distribution ==
The type specimen of this marine species was found off Forrester Island, Alaska.
