= UTC−09:00 =

Time zone

- Time zone
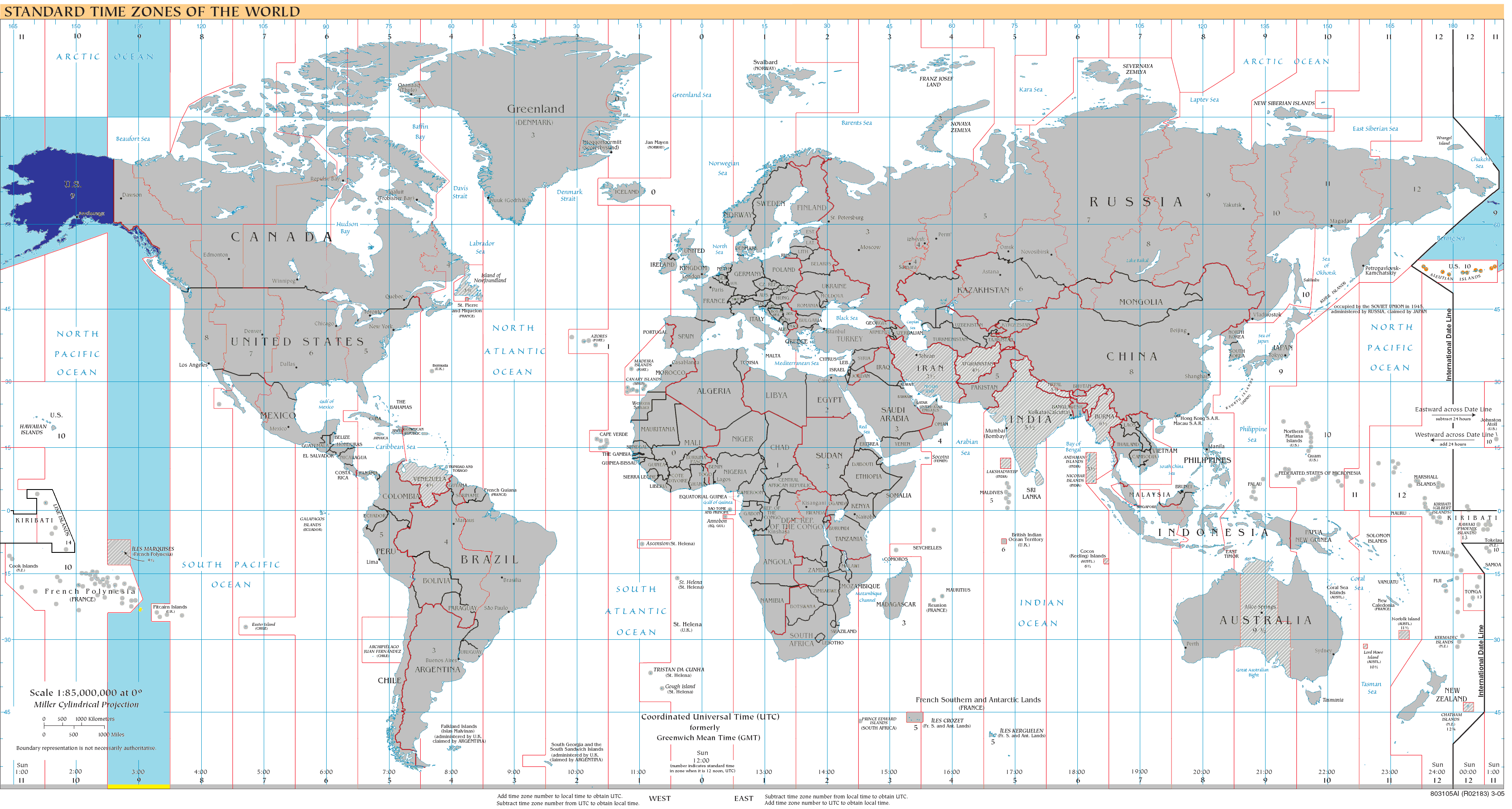
- World map with the time zone highlighted

UTC offset
- UTC: UTC−09:00

Current time
- 17:11, 25 November 2025 UTC−09:00 [refresh]

Central meridian
- 135 degrees W

Date-time group
- V

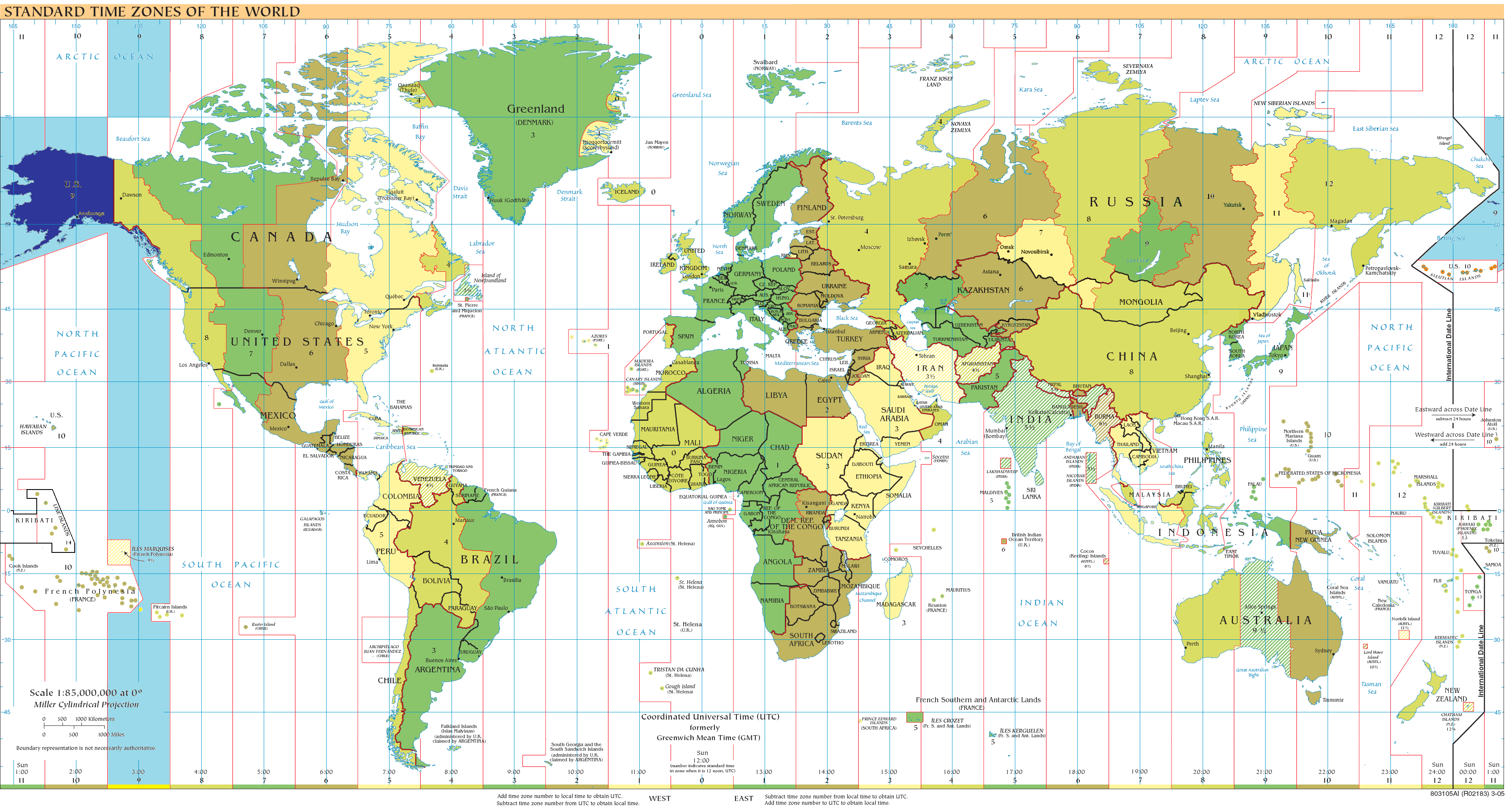
UTC−09:00: blue (December), orange (June), yellow (year-round), light blue (sea areas)

UTC−09:00 is an identifier for a time offset from UTC of −09:00. This time is used in:

== As standard time (Northern Hemisphere winter) ==
Principal city: Anchorage

=== North America ===
- United States
  - Alaska
    - Except Aleutian Islands west of 169.30°W
  - Hall Island (Alaska), at longitude 173°6′W, is the westernmost area of Alaska that observes UTC−09:00, but is far west of the theoretical zone limits (−142.5° to −127.5° longitude). Its position equates to a mean solar time of UTC−11:32. The westernmost inhabited place in Alaska that observes UTC-09:00 is Gambell on the Northwest Cape of St. Lawrence Island, which is at 171°42′W.

== As daylight saving time (Northern Hemisphere summer) ==
Principal settlement: Adak

=== North America ===
- United States
  - Alaska
    - Aleutian Islands east of 169.30°W

== As standard time (year-round) ==
Principal settlement: Rikitea

=== Oceania ===
==== Pacific Ocean ====
===== Polynesia =====
- France
  - French Polynesia
    - Gambier Islands
