= Insular vole =

Conservation status
- Least Concern (IUCN 3.1)

Scientific classification
- Kingdom: Animalia
- Phylum: Chordata
- Class: Mammalia
- Order: Rodentia
- Family: Cricetidae
- Subfamily: Arvicolinae
- Genus: Microtus
- Subgenus: Mynomes
- Species: M. abbreviatus

Binomial name
- Microtus abbreviatus Miller, 1899
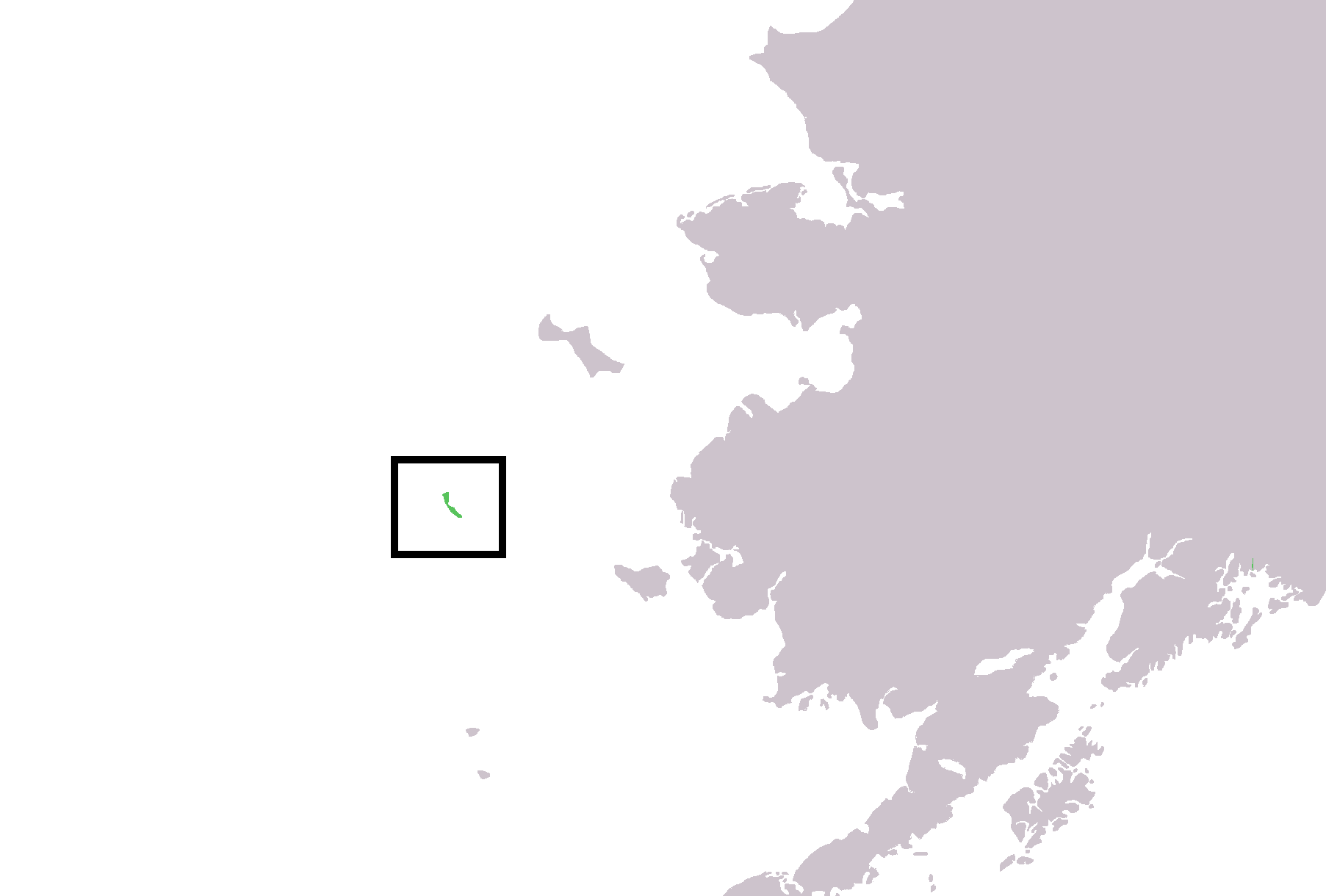

Species of rodent

The insular vole or St. Matthew Island vole (Microtus abbreviatus) is a species of rodent in the family Cricetidae. It occurs only on St. Matthew Island and the adjacent Hall Island, in Alaska. On these Bering Sea islands, insular voles live in damp lowland areas, on the lower slopes of mountains, and on rye grass-covered beaches. They are diurnal and eat plant matter. Birds and Arctic foxes (which are the only other mammals on the island) prey on the voles.
