= Nash Harbor, Alaska =

Unincorporated community in the state of Alaska, United States

- Unincorporated community
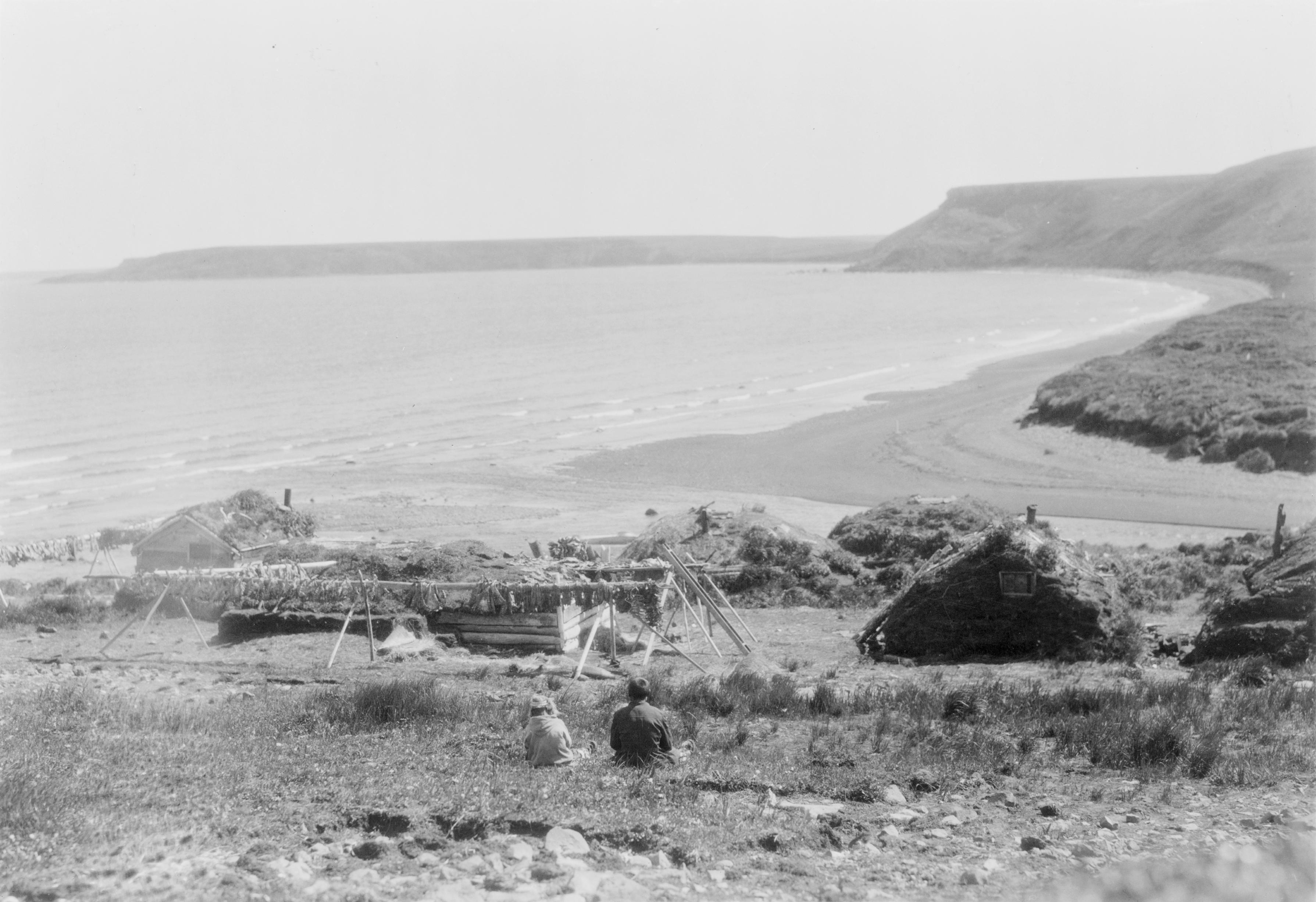
- Cup'ig village at Nash Harbor in 1927, photo by Edward Curtis

- Location within Alaska
- Coordinates: 60°12′20″N 166°56′18″W
- Country: United States
- State: Alaska
- Census Area: Bethel

Government
  - State senator: Lyman Hoffman (D)
  - State rep.: Tiffany Zulkosky (R)
- Elevation: 0 ft (0 m)
- Time zone: UTC-9 (Alaska (AKST))
  - Summer (DST): UTC-8 (AKDT)
- Area code: 907
- GNIS feature ID: 1406850

Nash Harbor is an unincorporated community on Nunivak Island in Bethel Census Area, Alaska, United States. Nash Harbor is located on the western shore of the bay of the same name, on the northern coast of the island. It lies 35 miles (56 km) west of Mekoryuk, the main city on the island. The community was originally a Yupik settlement and had a population of 49 in 1950. Ellikarrmiut Summer Science Field Camp, a college-level biology camp, is held in Nash Harbor.

== Demographics ==
Historical population
Census	Pop.	Note	%±
1950	49		—
U.S. Decennial Census

Nash Harbor appeared once on the U.S. Census in 1950 as an unincorporated village. It has not returned since.
