= Chiswell Islands =

Group of islands in the Gulf of Alaska

Coordinates: 59°36′49″N 149°35′59″W

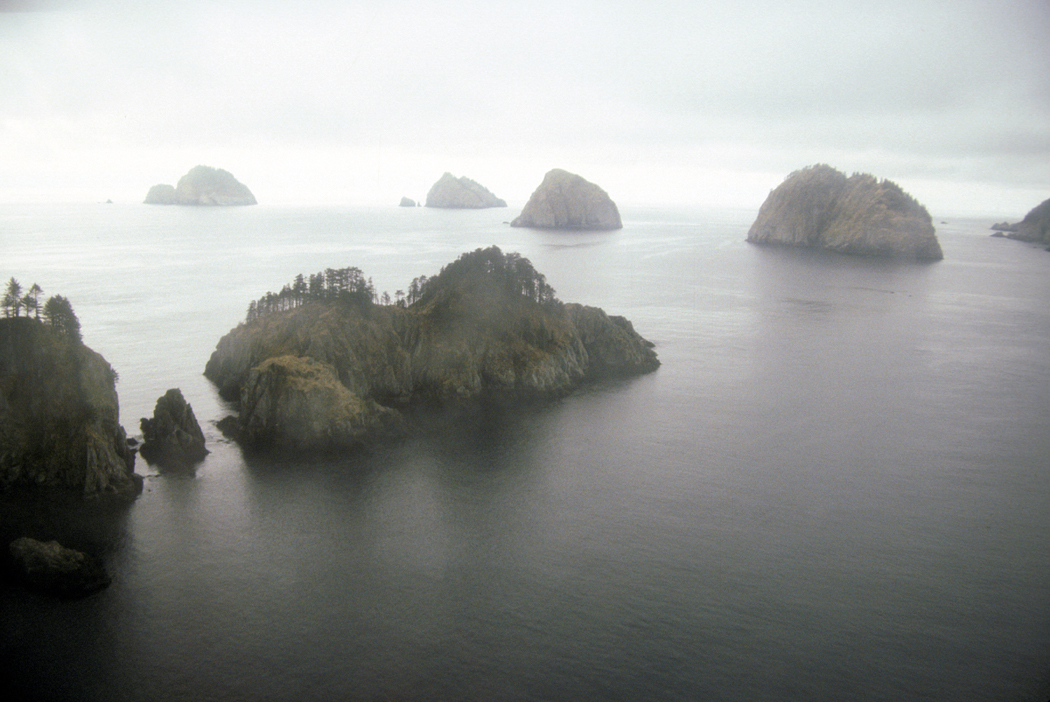
Chiswell Island group

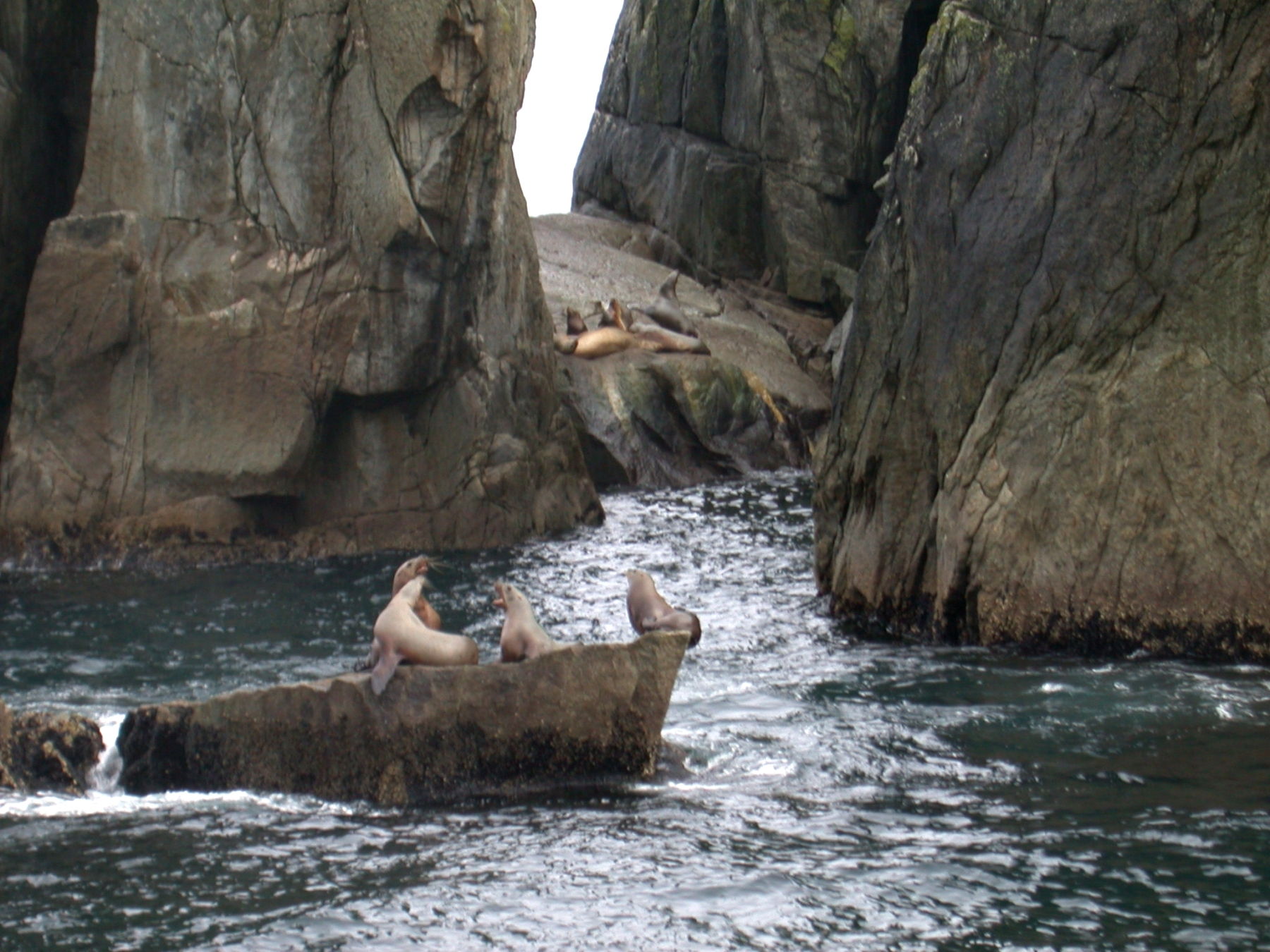
Sea lions on the islands

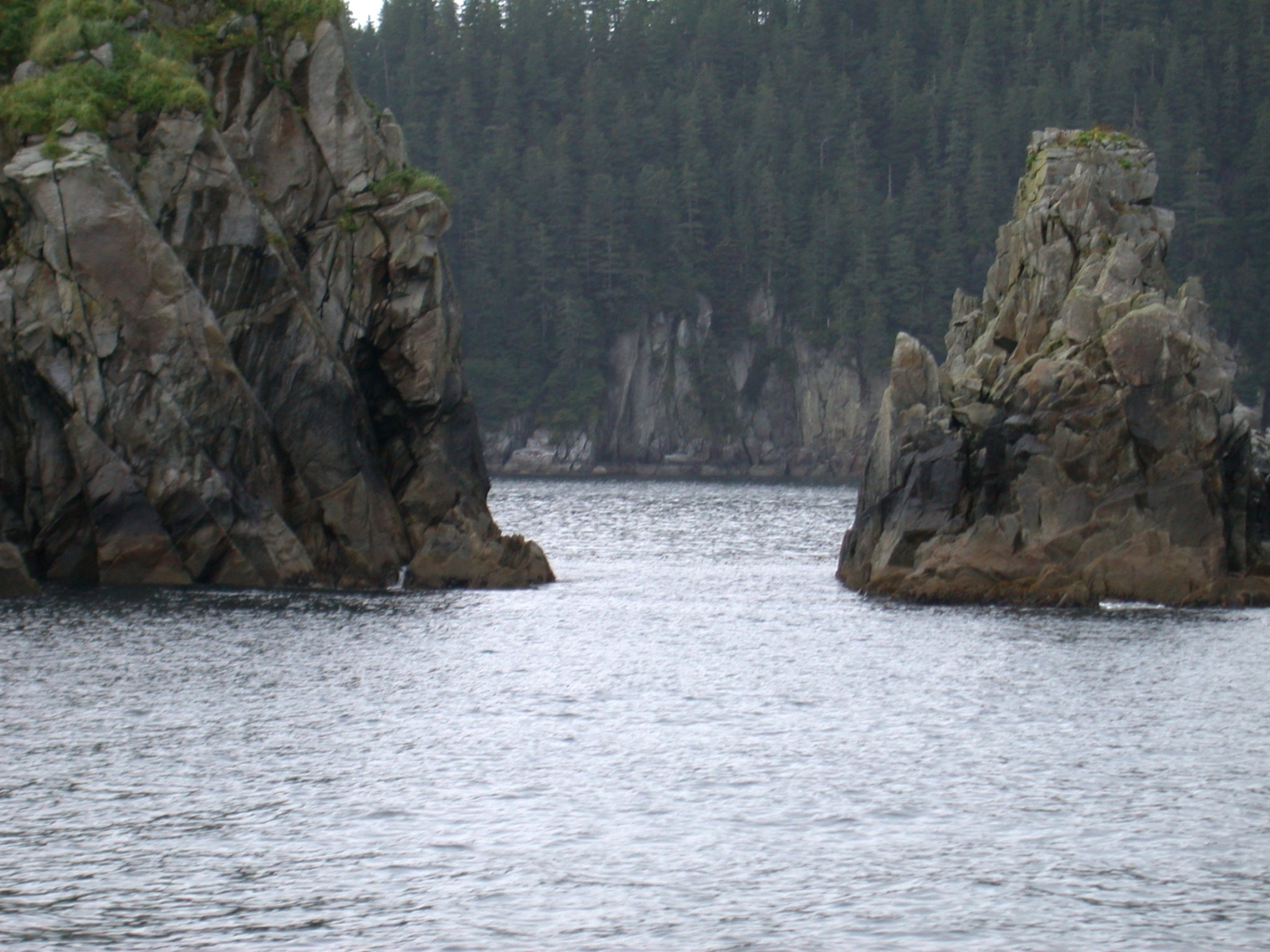
Chiswell Islands

The Chiswell Islands are a group of rocky, uninhabited islands, accessible only by boat or airplane, within the Kenai Peninsula Borough of Alaska in the Gulf of Alaska. These islands are 35 miles south of Seward, Alaska. They are part of the Alaska Maritime National Wildlife Refuge and an important bird sanctuary. The area is very active seismically and evidence of this can be seen in the rugged landscape, a rough hewn landscape that has also been carved by high tides and rough seas. These island appear to rise vertically out of the sea; there are no horizontal beaches. Starfish, barnacles and other sea life that thrive in a rocky habitat are abundant. The islands are inhabited by millions of marine birds and mammals and is the location of a small rookery of endangered Steller sea lions.

Every year millions of birds of various species nest on the refuge islands. Birds that nest on these islands include horned puffins, black-legged kittiwakes (which nest on the exposed rock face of cliffs), tufted puffins and various auklets such as Cassin's auklet and the whiskered auklet.
