= Demid Ilyich Kulikalov =

19th-century administrator of Russian America

Demid Ilyich Kulikalov was an administrator of Russian America during the first decade of the 19th century. He served in the Russian-American Company for several decades, led early expeditions into what is now Alaska, administered RAC interests in the Pribilof Islands, and headed the Russian-American Company's Atka station.

Kulikalov's origins with the Russian-American Company are unclear. In 1794, he was the co-leader of the first Russian expedition from Kodiak Island to explore Yakutat Bay, a hunting expedition that covered much of the southern coast of Alaska and included more than 1,000 natives and Russians.

In 1805, Kulikalov ordered to head the RAC's organization in the Andreanof Islands. Before he departed the RAC's base of operations in Unalaska, however, he was flogged on the orders of Nikolai Rezanov for alleged cruelty to an Aleut woman and her child and was expelled from Russian America in chains. Kuliakalov was a trusted assistant to Russian America governor Alexander Baranov, and either returned to the colony or was never transported out (sources are unclear). Kuliakalov was put in charge of establishing a colony on St. Matthew Island in 1809 and returned to Unalaska in 1810. That year, Kulikalov unsuccessfully sought to have an illegitimate child (born through a partnership with an Aleut woman) sent to Russia for education. The reason given was that Kulikalov "had legitimate children in Irkutsk." Ten years later, Baranov's intervention secured son a trip to St. Petersburg, and he later returned to Russian America.
