= Besboro Island =

Island in Alaska, United States

Coordinates: 64°07′12″N 161°18′35″W

Location in Alaska

Besboro Island (Inupiaq: Qikiqtaq) is a small island in the Norton Sound, Bering Sea, off the shores of Alaska. It is located 11 miles (18 km) west of the mainland and 38 miles (61 km) southwest of Christmas Mountain, Nulato Hills.

Besboro island stretches from north to south and is only 2 miles in length and a half mile across at its widest. It is, however, very craggy, rising up to a height of 903 feet (275 m). Administratively, this island belongs to the Nome Census Area, Alaska. It is owned by the Unalakleet Native Corporation (90%) and the Shaktoolik Native Corporation (10%). It is used by the locals for subsistence and recreational activities and by deep water vessels for safe harbor in stormy weather. The tidal sand spit that stretches off the northeast corner is a haul out area for seal.

This island was named on September 12, 1778, by Captain James Cook(1785, v. 2, p. 479), RN, who published it as "Besborough Island." It is part of the Bering Sea unit of the Alaska Maritime National Wildlife Refuge.
