= St. Matthew Island =

American uninhabited island in Alaska

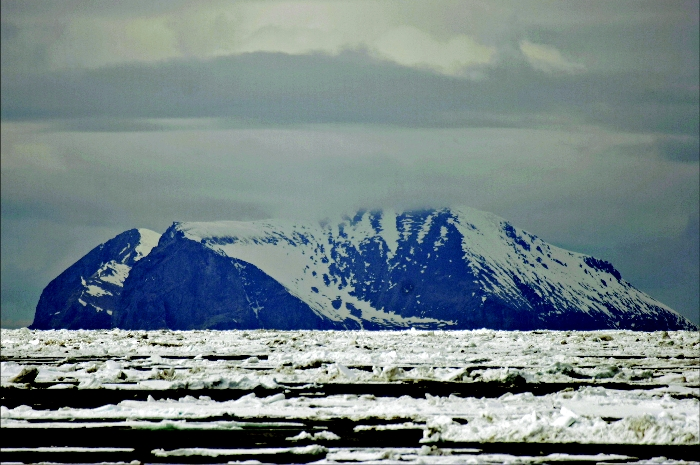
- View of Cape Upright, St. Matthew Island

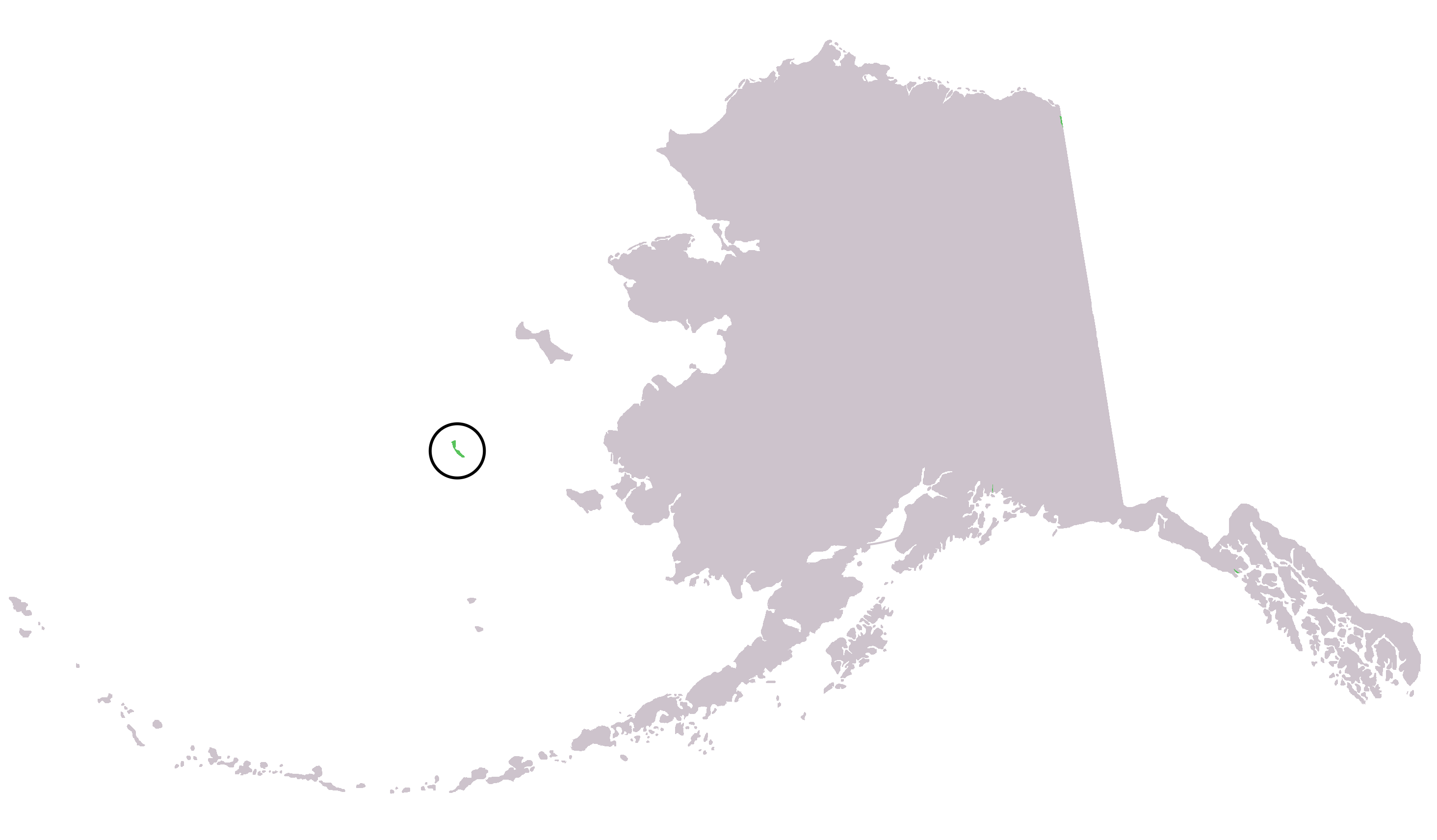

Geography
- Location: Bering Sea
- Coordinates: 60°24′31″N 172°43′12″W
- Archipelago: none
- Area: 137.857 sq mi (357.05 km^{2})
- Length: 31.7 mi (51 km)
- Highest elevation: 1,476 ft (449.9 m)

Administration
- United States
- State: Alaska

Demographics
- Population: Uninhabited

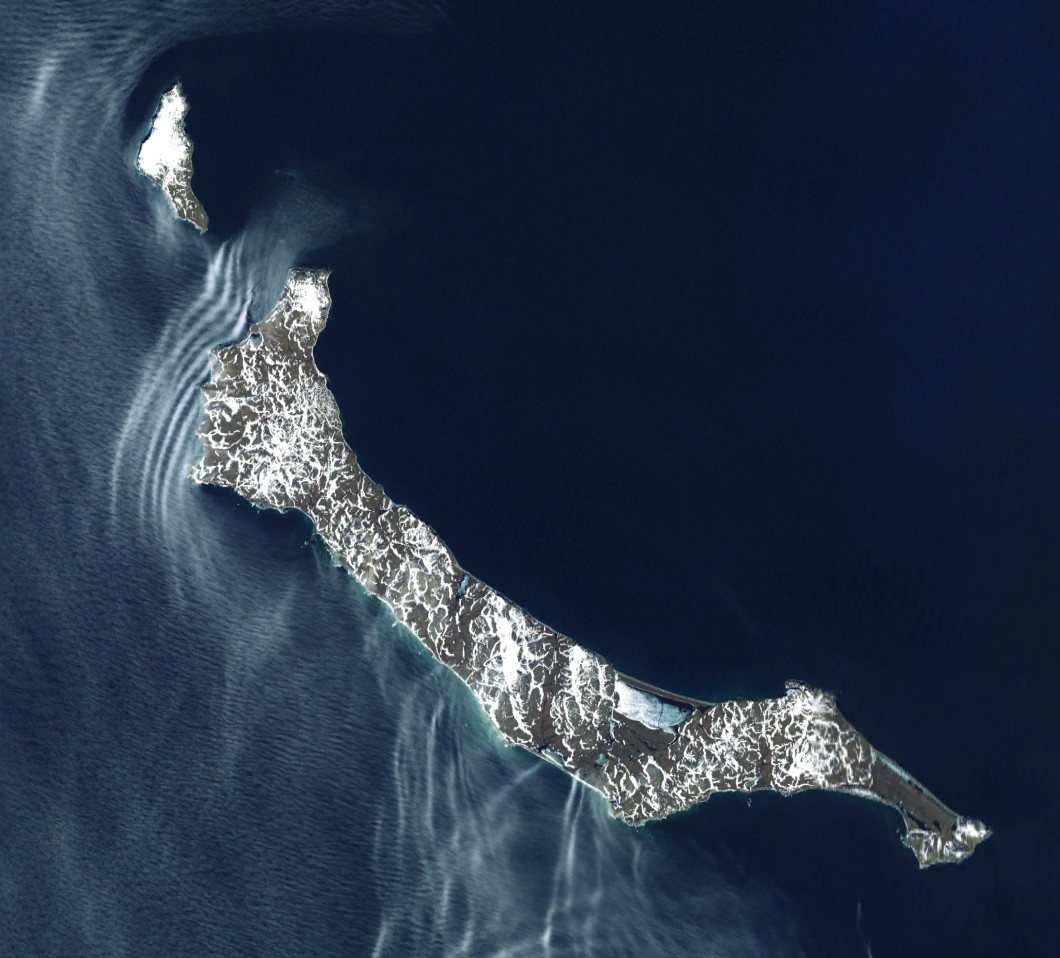
Satellite view of St. Matthew Island

Map

St. Matthew Island (Russian: Остров Святого Матвея, romanized: Ostrov Svyatogo Matveya) is an uninhabited, remote island in the Bering Sea in Alaska, 183 miles (295 km) west-northwest of Nunivak Island. The entire island's natural scenery and wildlife is protected, as it is part of the Bering Sea unit of the Alaska Maritime National Wildlife Refuge and as the Bering Sea Wilderness.

The island has a land area of 137.857 sq mi (357.05 km^{2}), making it the 44th-largest island of the United States. Its most southern point is Cape Upright, which features cliff faces exceeding 1,000 feet (300 m) in height. Similar heights are found at Glory of Russia Cape on the north, and the highest point, 1,476 feet (450 m) above sea level, lies south from the island center.

There is a small island off its northwestern point called Hall Island. The 3.1 miles (5.0 km) wide sound between the two islands is called Sarichef Strait. A small rocky islet called Pinnacle Rock lies 9.3 miles (15.0 km) to the south of Saint Matthew Island.

The United States Coast Guard maintained a staffed LORAN transmitter station on the island during the 1940s.

== Geology and climate ==
The climatic conditions in the entire Bering Sea Area, according to National Climatic Data Center (1986), is reported as maritime with "considerable wind and cool, humid and cloudy conditions" with mean annual temperature of 37.8 °F (3.2 °C) and annual precipitation of 15.3 in (390 mm) on St. Matthew Island. The geological formation recorded on St. Matthew Island consists of calc-alkaline volcanic rocks of Late Cretaceous and earliest tertiary age with Pergelic Cryaquolls and Pergelic Cryoborolls soil types.

== Human habitation ==
Owing to the remoteness and inhospitability of the island, St. Matthew was uninhabited until the modern era. The first recorded attempt at settlement occurred in 1809, when a Russian group led by Demid Ilyich Kulikalov, under the aegis of the Russian-American Company, established an experimental outpost.

In August of 1916, the power schooner Great Bear, led by John Borden and Captain Louis Lane wrecked on Pinnacle Rock. The party used whaleboats to row themselves and their supplies the 9 miles north to St. Matthew Island where they set up camp. All were rescued 15 days later by the USS McCulloch.

A 2013 sailing expedition to the island showed that, in spite of the lack of human habitation, extensive areas of beach were heavily contaminated with plastic marine debris, particularly from the fishing industry.

== Mammals ==
Presently, Arctic foxes (subspecies hallensis) and insular voles are the only mammals resident on the island, though polar bears occasionally visit via drift ice. Notably, St. Matthew Island is among the southernmost parts of the range of polar bears in the Bering Sea.

Reindeer introduced to St. Matthew Island in 1944 increased from 29 animals at that time to 6,000 in the summer of 1963, a drastic overshoot of the island's carrying capacity causing a crash die-off the following winter to 42 animals. Based on the size of the island, recent estimates put the carrying capacity at about 1,670 animals [Klein, D. R. (n.d.). The Introduction, Increase, and Crash of Reindeer on St. Matthew Island. Retrieved May 25, 2016, from https://web.archive.org/web/20110709032911/http://dieoff.org/page80.htm].

=== St. Matthew Island Reindeer ===
In 1944, 29 reindeer were introduced to the island by the United States Coast Guard to provide an emergency food source. The Coast Guard abandoned the island a few years later, leaving the reindeer. Subsequently, the reindeer population rose to about 6,000 by 1963 and then died off in the next two years to 42 animals. A scientific study attributed the population crash to the limited food supply in interaction with climatic factors (the winter of 1963–1964 was exceptionally severe in the region). By the 1980s, the reindeer population had completely died out. Environmentalists see this as an issue of overpopulation. For example, ecologist Garrett Hardin cited the "natural experiment" of St. Matthew Island of the reindeer population explosion and collapse as a paradigmatic example of the consequences of overpopulation in his essay An Ecolate View of the Human Predicament.

The reindeer had a long term effect on the ecology of St. Matthew. Their heavy grazing substantially reduced the lichen and shifted the island ecology towards one dominated by grasses.

== Birds ==
Despite its high latitude, St. Matthew Island contains significant populations of endemic and migratory birds. In fact, the Department of the Interior has called the island "one of the richest seabird nesting colonies in the world", with over 5 million seabirds nesting during breeding season. Over 140 different species of birds have been identified on the island. The island, along with its small satellites Hall Island and Pinnacle Rock, contains the entire breeding range of McKay's bunting. Additionally, a subspecies of rock sandpiper (Calidris ptilocnemis ptilocnemis) and a subspecies of gray-crowned rosy finch (Leucosticte tephrocotis umbrina) breed only on the island and the nearby Pribilof Islands. Both McKay's bunting and Calidris ptilocnemis ptilocnemis, with their restricted breeding ranges, are among the rarest birds in North America, making their preservation among the top priorities for conservation groups.

== Fish ==
There are two major lakes on the island, North Lake and Big Lake. The lakes contain a greater number of fish species (at least 5) than other nearby islands.

== Lichen ==
Lichen studies were conducted on the island in the 1990s to prepare a list of lichens with their habitat, composition and distribution pattern. These studies were considered important for characterizing the eating habits of caribou and air quality. The vegetation of the islands has been classified as wet, moist and alpine tundra, based on landforms and drainage patterns. The plant communities were attributed to five categories. In the area of rock rubble fields and high ridges the vegetation was mainly crustose lichens. Among the 148 lichen species of the islands, 125 showed the Arctic–alpine geographic distribution, 74 boreal, 18 were coastal, 9 amphi-Berengian and 41 widespread, with many species falling into more than one category. The lichen diversity was characterized by wide-ranging Arctic–alpine and boreal species; it was evaluated as luxuriant that was linked to reindeer species disappearing from the area.

Before the heavy grazing by reindeer in the 1940s, lichen was the predominant groundcover on the island. By 1963, scientists reported that lichen mats seldom exceeded about 1cm, compared with 8-12 cm on the nearby Hall Island. Once the lichen mat was removed, sedges, grasses, and willows initially increased because they were no longer covered or shaded by the lichen. Today the vegetation has a greater proportion of grasses and other vascular plants, given the slow growth of lichen.

== In popular culture ==
The island serves as a location to which the characters in the 2025 film Mission: Impossible – The Final Reckoning travel, though the scenes in the movie that take place there were actually shot in Svalbard, Norway.

== See also ==
- Glory of Russia Cape
