= Hazy Islands Wilderness =

Protected area in Alaska, United States

- IUCN category Ib (wilderness area)
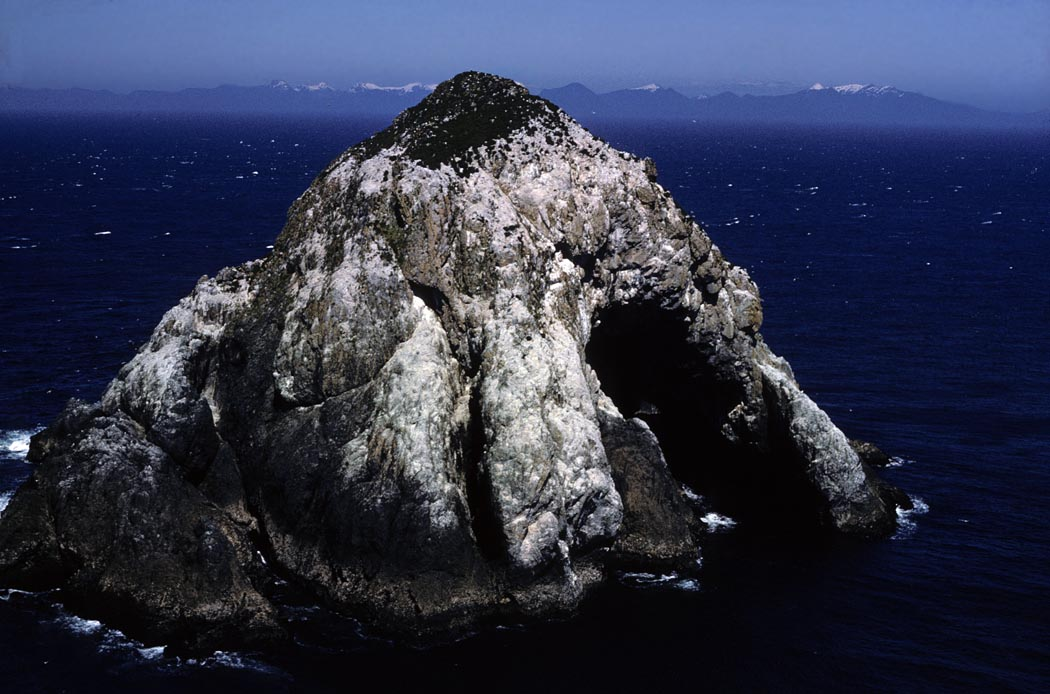
- Hazy Islet, Hazy Islands Wilderness

- Location within Alaska
- Location: Petersburg Borough, Alaska, USA
- Nearest city: Edna Bay, Alaska
- Coordinates: 55°53′N 134°35′W
- Area: 32 acres (13 ha)
- Established: 1970
- Governing body: US Fish and Wildlife Service

Hazy Islands Wilderness, at 32 acres (16 ha), is Alaska's smallest wilderness area. It was officially designated as Wilderness in 1970 by the United States Congress. The islands are located west of Coronation Island in the Alaska Panhandle area. Hazy Islands Wilderness comprises five small islands and is home to 10 species of birds, including Brandt's cormorant (Phalacrocorax auritus). It has no anchorages or campsites, and human visitation is discouraged to protect the birds.

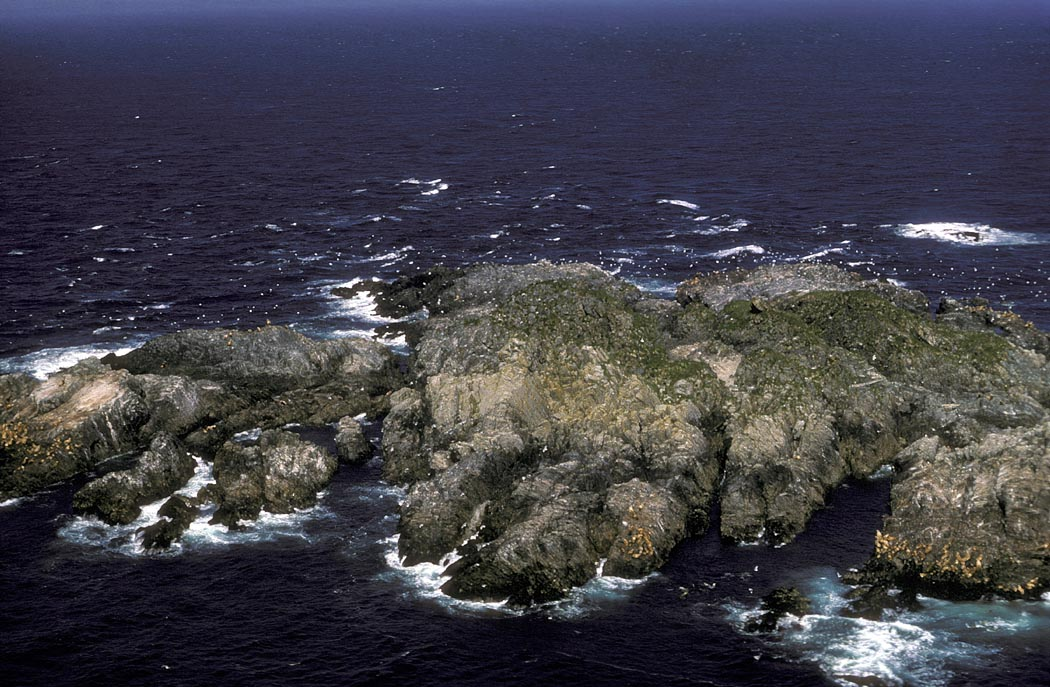
Gulls and sea lions at Hazy Islands Wilderness

== Name ==
The name for the islands in the Tlingit language is Deikee Noow, which can be translated as Outer (Deikee) Fort (Noow), although the word "noow" is also the name for a treeless rock formation. It figures into the "Raven Cycle' story of when Yéil (Raven) stole freshwater from Gánóok (Petrel).

== Description ==
Hazy Islands National Wildlife Refuge was established in 1912, which became designated as Wilderness in 1970, and incorporated into the Alaska Maritime National Wildlife Refuge, Gulf of Alaska Unit, in 1980.

Big Hazy Island and the four smaller islands provide predator-free nesting areas for large populations of:

- common murres
- pigeon guillemots
- glaucous-winged gulls
- horned puffins
- tufted puffins
- Brandt's cormorants

== See also ==
- List of U.S. Wilderness Areas
- Wilderness Act
