= Alaska Maritime National Wildlife Refuge =

Protected areas in Alaska, US

- IUCN category IV (habitat/species management area)
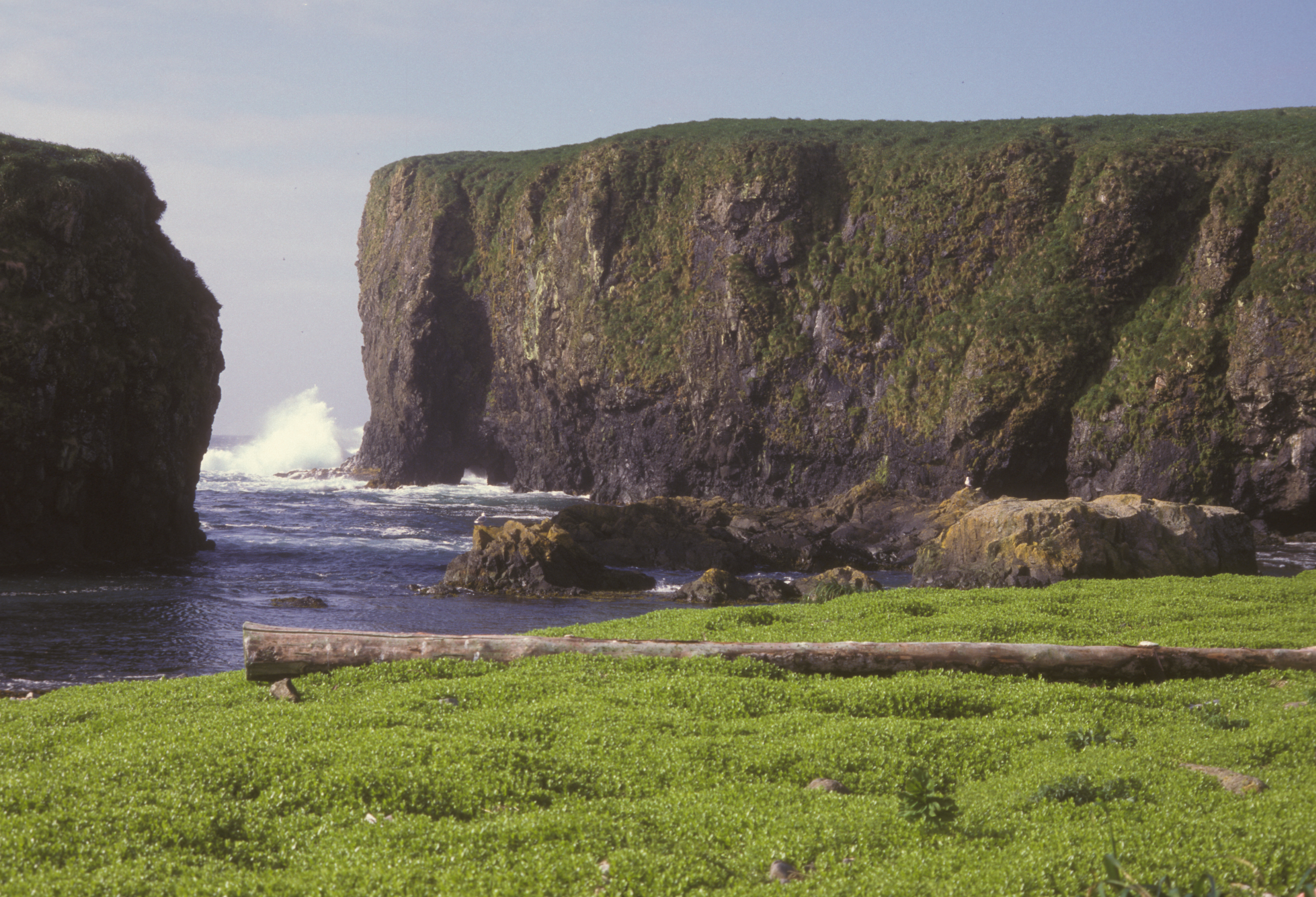
- Alaska Maritime National Wildlife Refuge, Aleutian Island Unit

- Location within Alaska
- Location: Alaska, United States
- Coordinates: 52°N 174°W
- Area: 4,900,000 acres (20,000 km^{2})
- Established: 1980
- Governing body: U.S. Fish and Wildlife Service
- Website: alaskamaritime.fws.gov

The Alaska Maritime National Wildlife Refuge (often shortened to Alaska Maritime or AMNWR) is a United States National Wildlife Refuge comprising 2,400 islands, headlands, rocks, islets, spires and reefs in Alaska, with a total area of 4.9 million acres (20,000 km^{2}), of which 2.64 million acres (10,700 km^{2}) is wilderness. The refuge stretches from Cape Lisburne on the Chukchi Sea to the tip of the Aleutian Islands in the west and Forrester Island in the southern Alaska Panhandle region in the east. The refuge has diverse landforms and terrains, including tundra, rainforest, cliffs, volcanoes, beaches, lakes, and streams.

Alaska Maritime National Wildlife Refuge is well known for its abundance of seabirds. About 75 percent of Alaskan native marine birds, 15 to 30 million among 55 species, use the refuge. AMNWR also provides a nesting habitat for an estimated 40 million seabirds, representing 80 percent of all seabirds in North America. The birds congregate in "bird cities" (colonies) along the coast. Each species has a specialized nesting site (rock ledge, crevice, boulder rubble, pinnacle, or burrow). Other animals present in this refuge include caribou, sea lions, bears, coyotes, seals, Canada lynx, beavers, foxes, muskrats, wolf packs, moose, walrus, river otters, marten, whales, Dall sheep and sea otters.

The administrative headquarters and visitor center are located in Homer, Alaska. In 1968, Simeonof National Wildlife Refuge, part of the Alaska Maritime National Wildlife Refuge, was designated as a National Natural Landmark by the National Park Service.

== Administration ==
The refuge is divided into five units. Clockwise around Alaska, starting in the southeast, their component territories include:

=== Gulf of Alaska unit ===
- Saint Lazaria Wilderness (formerly Saint Lazaria National Wildlife Refuge) (Saint Lazaria Island)
- Hazy Islands Wilderness (Hazy Islands)
- Forrester Island Wilderness (Forrester Island, Lowrie Island, Wolf Rock)
- Barren Islands (East Amatuli Island, West Amatuli Island, Ushagat Island, et al.)
- Tuxedni Wilderness (Chisik Island, Duck Island, and Egg Island)
- Middleton Island
- Chiswell Islands
- Trinity Island (Sitkinak Island)

=== Alaska Peninsula unit ===
- Sutwik Island
- Semidi Wilderness (Semidi Islands: Aghik Island and Chowiet Island, et al.)
- Simeonof Wilderness (Simeonof Island, part of the Shumagin Islands)

=== Aleutian Islands unit ===
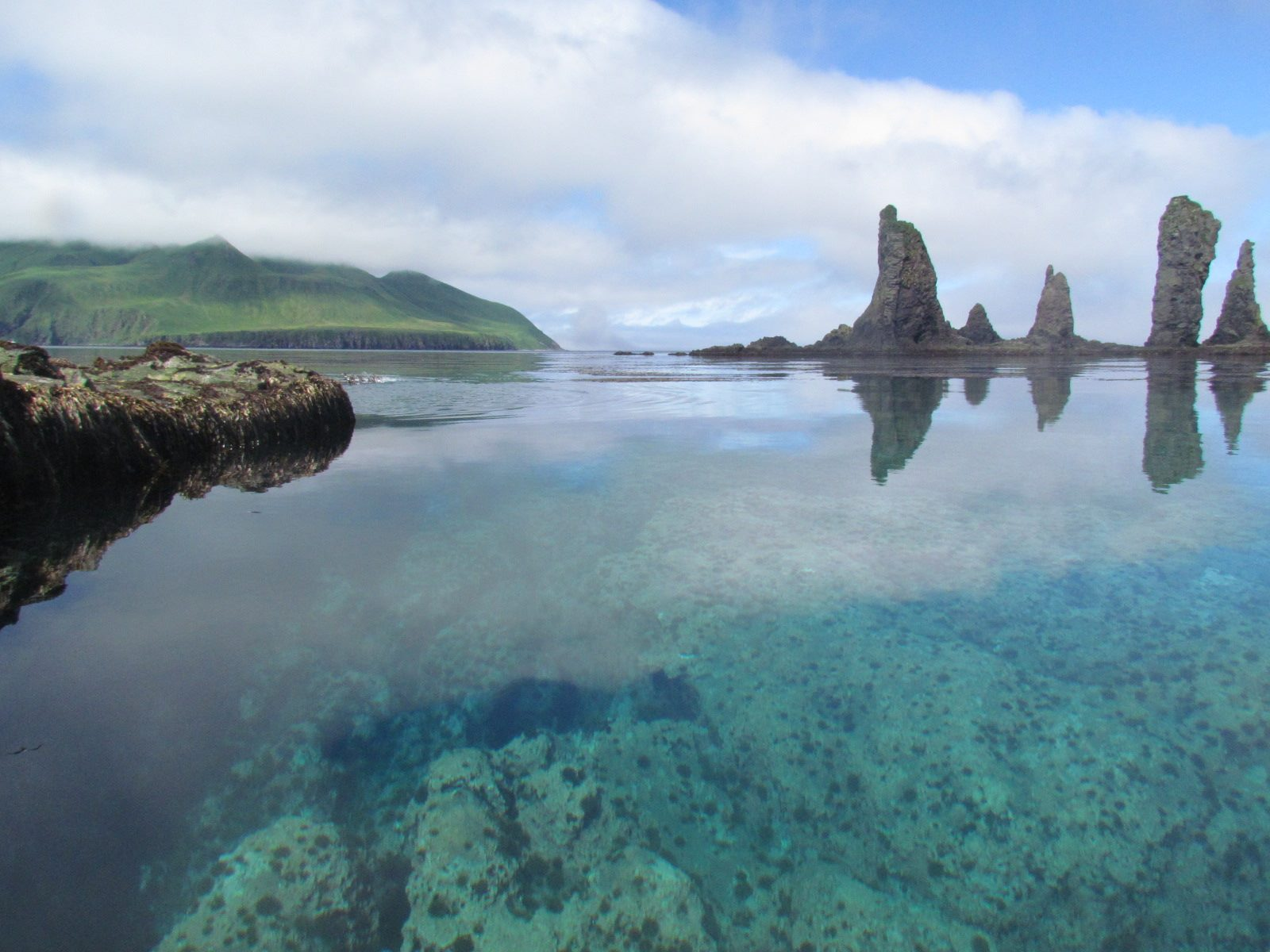
Kagamil Island

Includes most of the land area of the Aleutian Islands, from Unimak in the east to Attu in the west: Near Islands, Rat Islands, Delarof Islands, Andreanof Islands, Islands of Four Mountains, Fox Islands, and Krenitzin Islands

- Unimak Wilderness (Unimak Island)
- Aleutian Islands Wilderness – 1,300,000 acres (5,300 km^{2}), designated 1980
- Bogoslof Wilderness (Bogoslof Island) – 175 acres (71 ha), designated 1970

=== Bering Sea unit ===
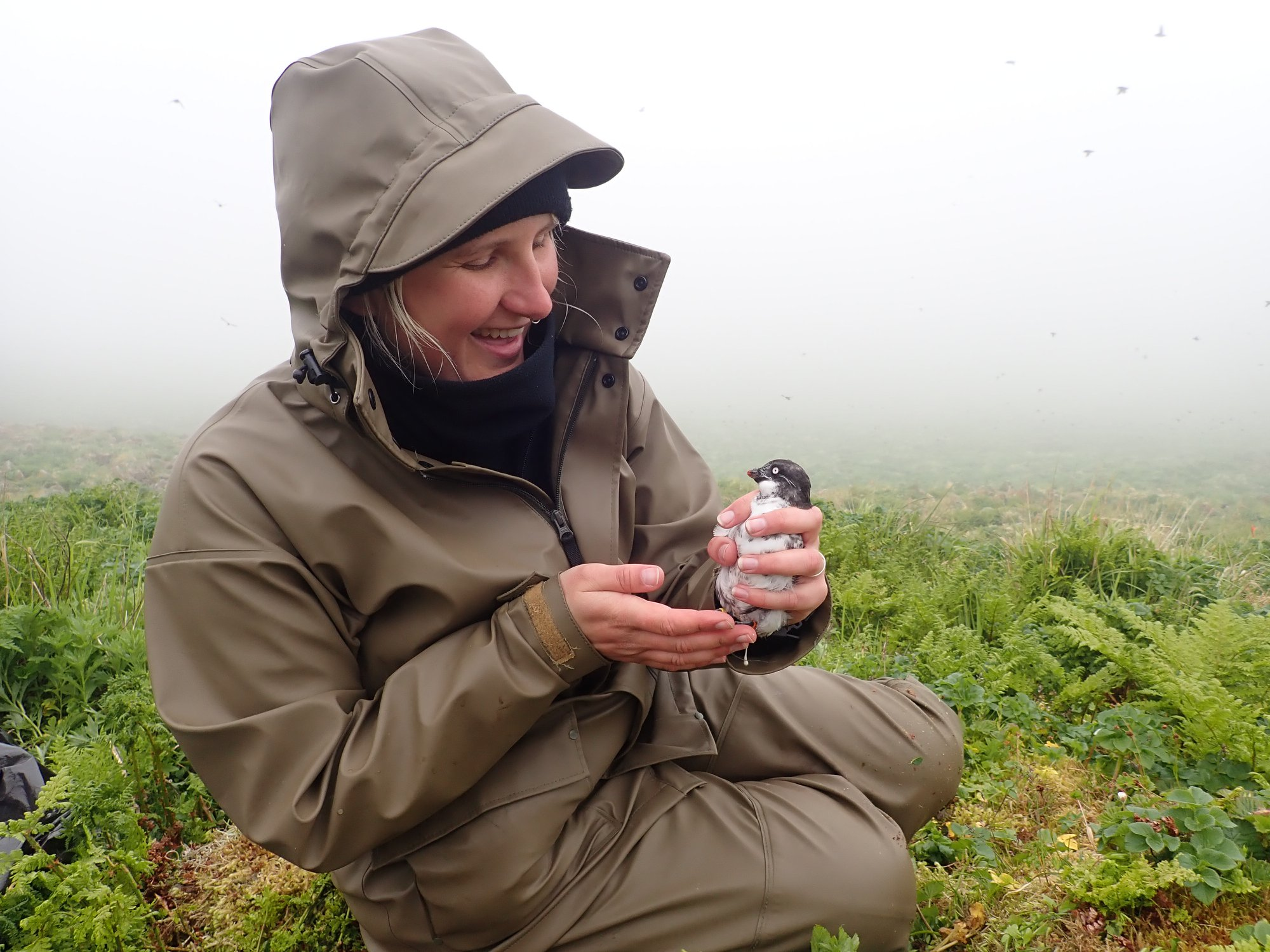
Refuge staffer holding a least auklet on St. George Island

- Hagemeister Island
- Pribilof Islands (St. George Island, St. Paul Island, Otter Island, Walrus Island)
- Bering Sea Wilderness (St. Matthew Island, Hall Island, Pinnacle Island) – 81,340 acres (32,920 ha), designated 1970
- Besboro Island
- Sledge Island
- King Island

=== Chukchi Sea unit ===
- Chamisso Wilderness (Chamisso Island, Puffin Island)
- Cape Thompson
- Cape Lisburne

== Gallery ==
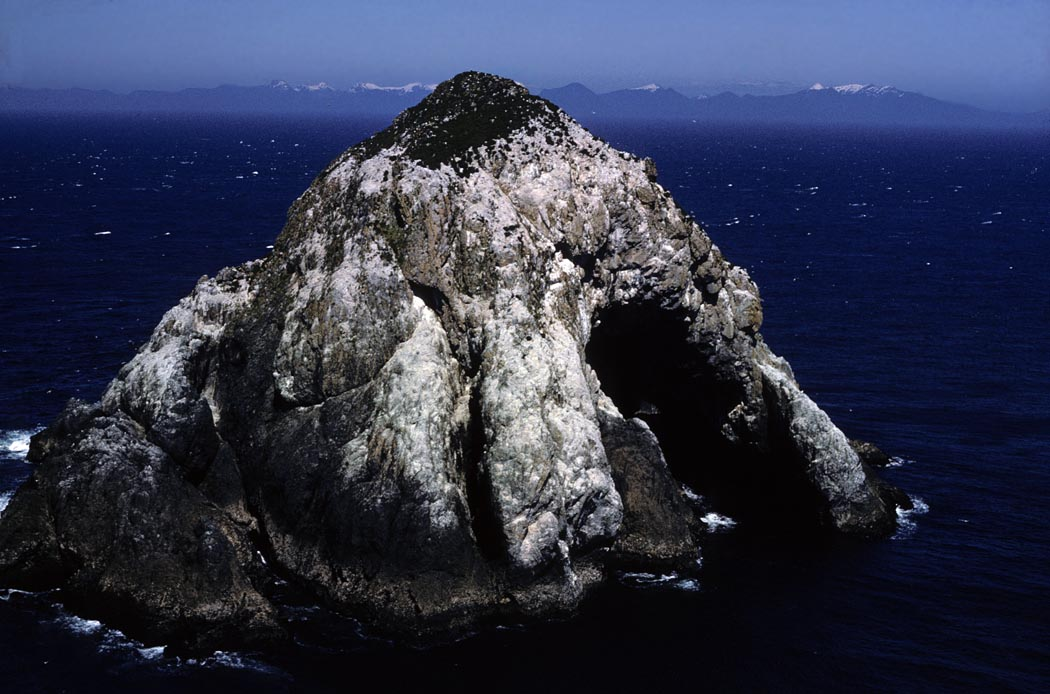
Big Hazy Islet - Alaska Maritime National Wildlife Refuge

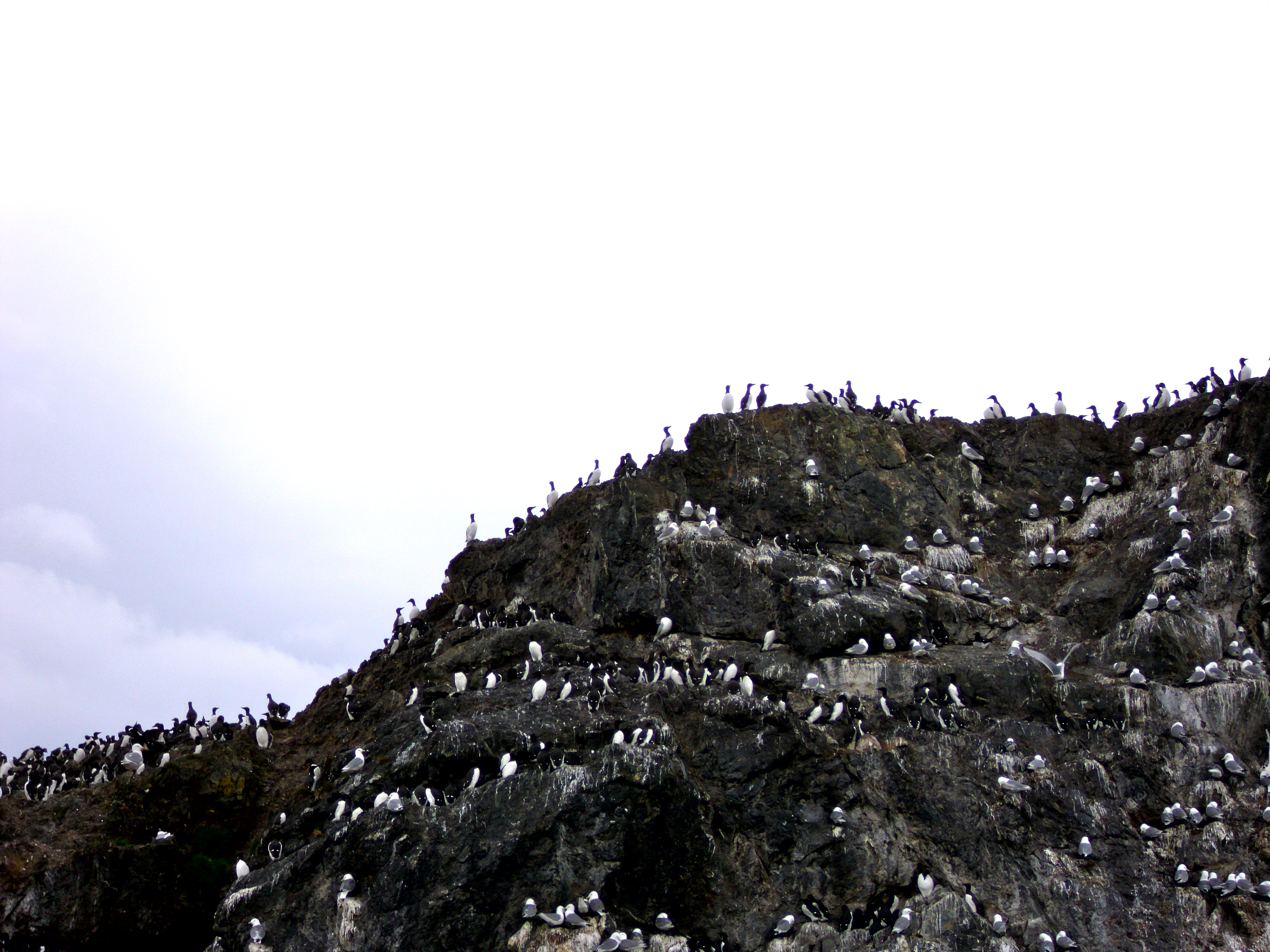
Gull Island, a small rocky outcropping on Kachemak Bay is the summer home to an estimated 10,000 seabirds

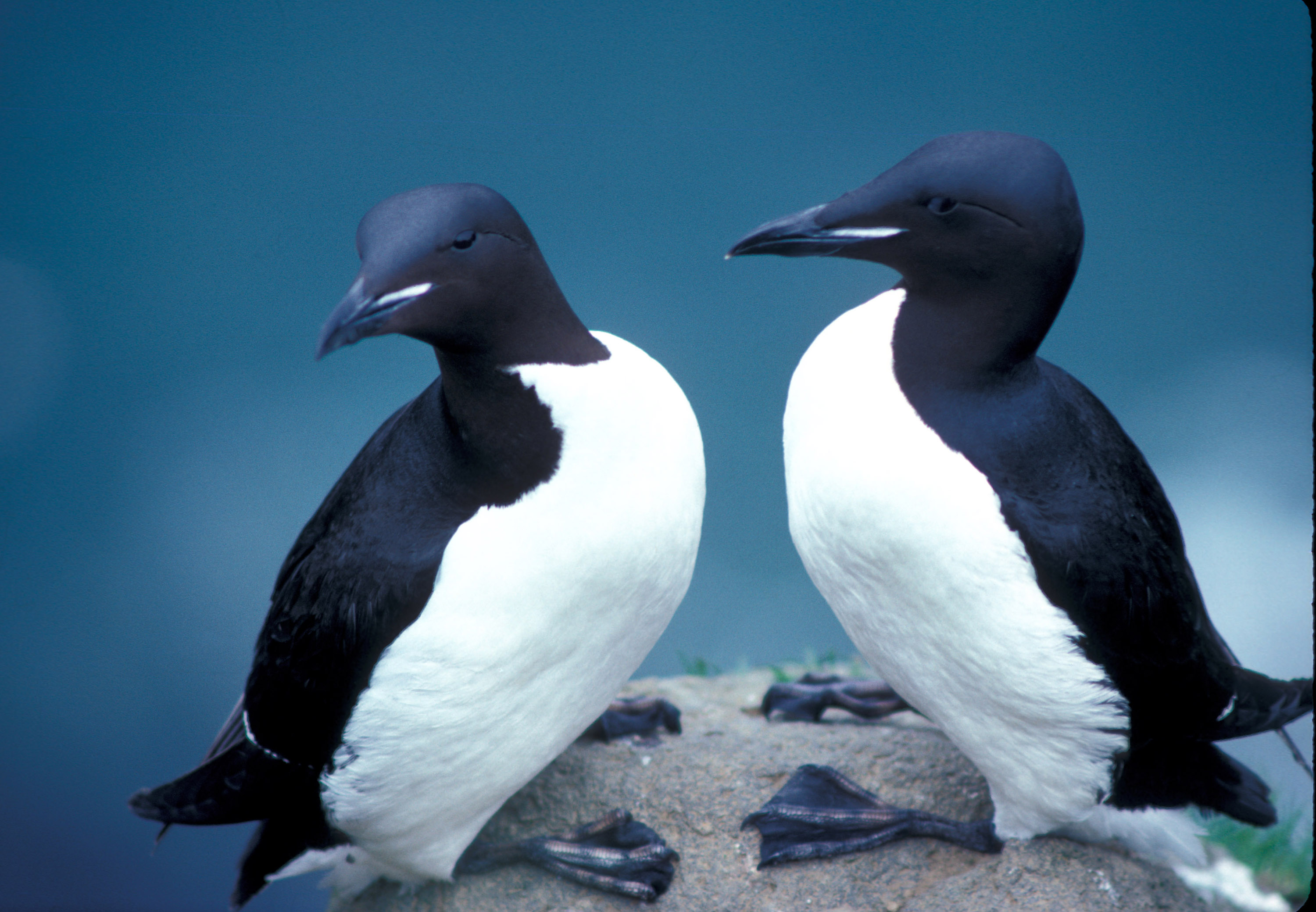
Thick-billed murres in the refuge

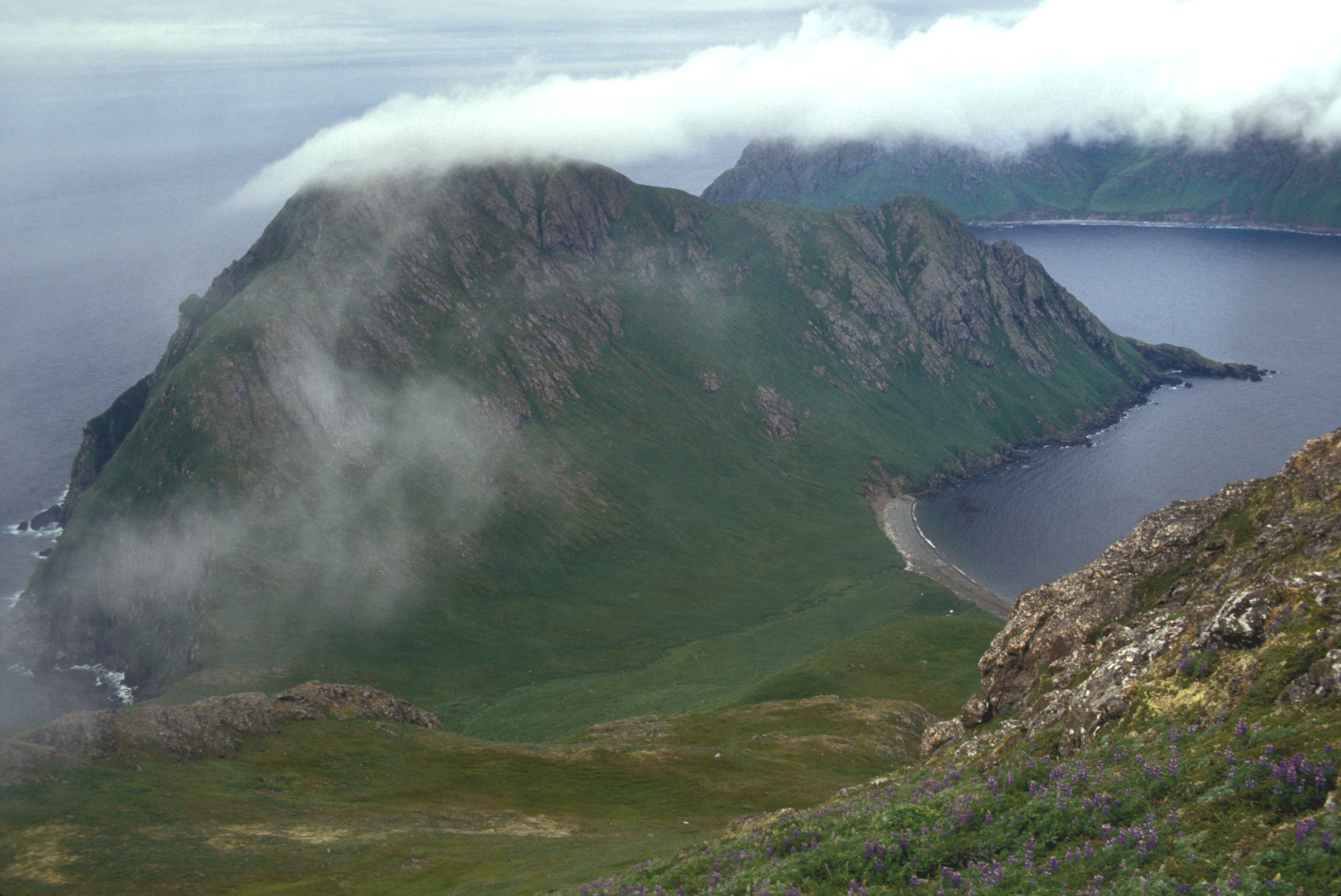
East Amatuli Island, Barren Islands, Gulf of Alaska Unit

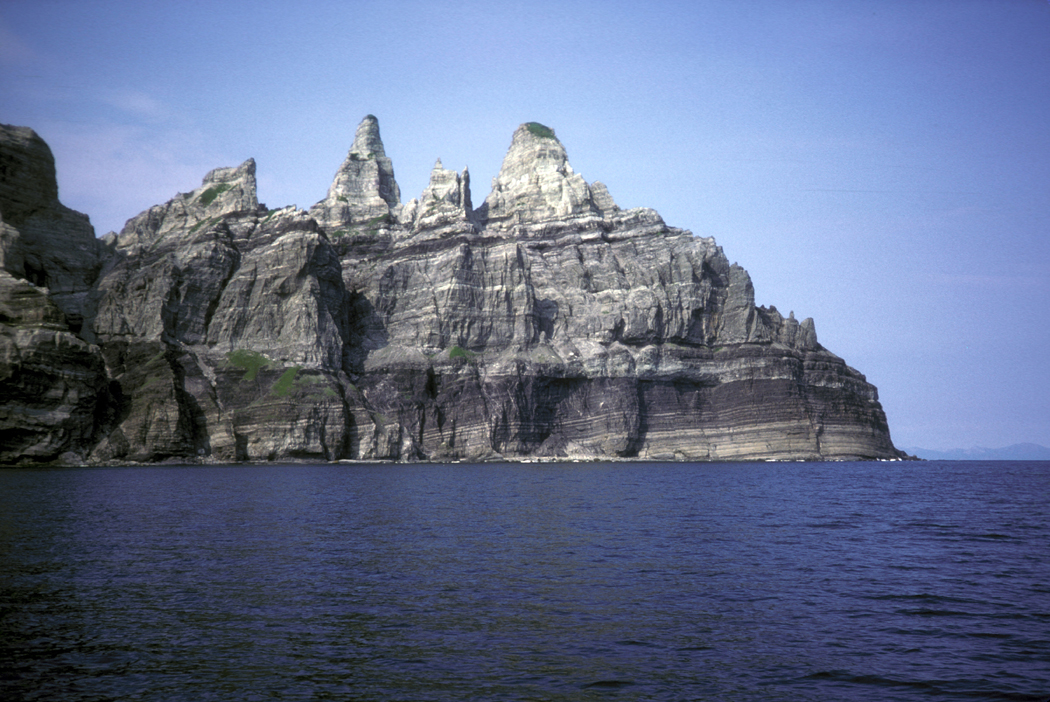
Castle Cape, Alaska Peninsula Unit

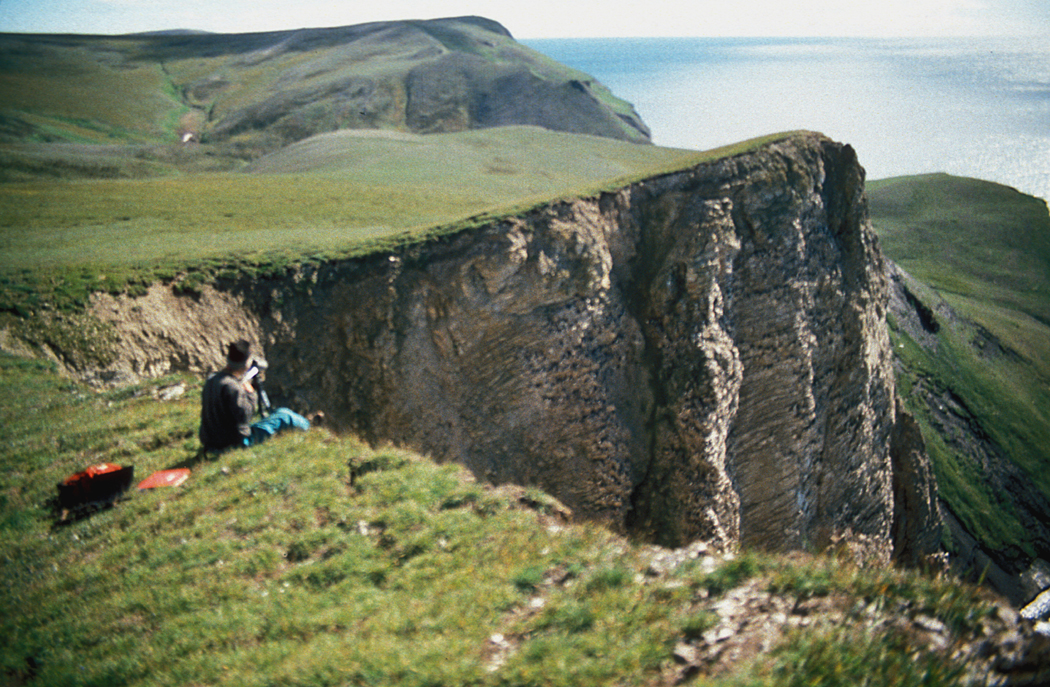
Cape Thompson

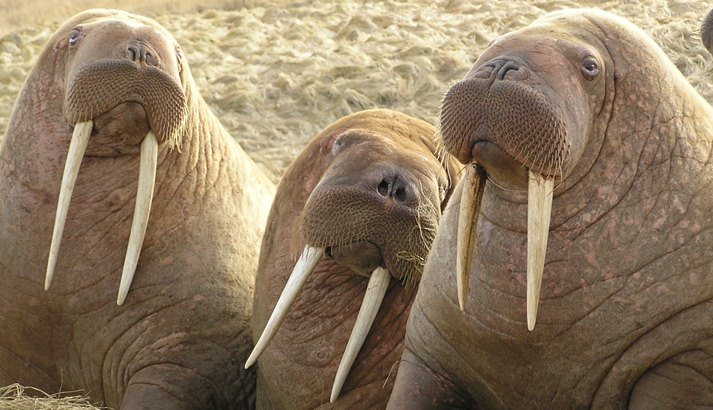
Three walrus near Cape Lisburne

== See also ==
- United States Fish and Wildlife Service
