= Forrester Island (Alaska) =

Alaskan island

Coordinates: 54°48′10″N 133°31′37″W

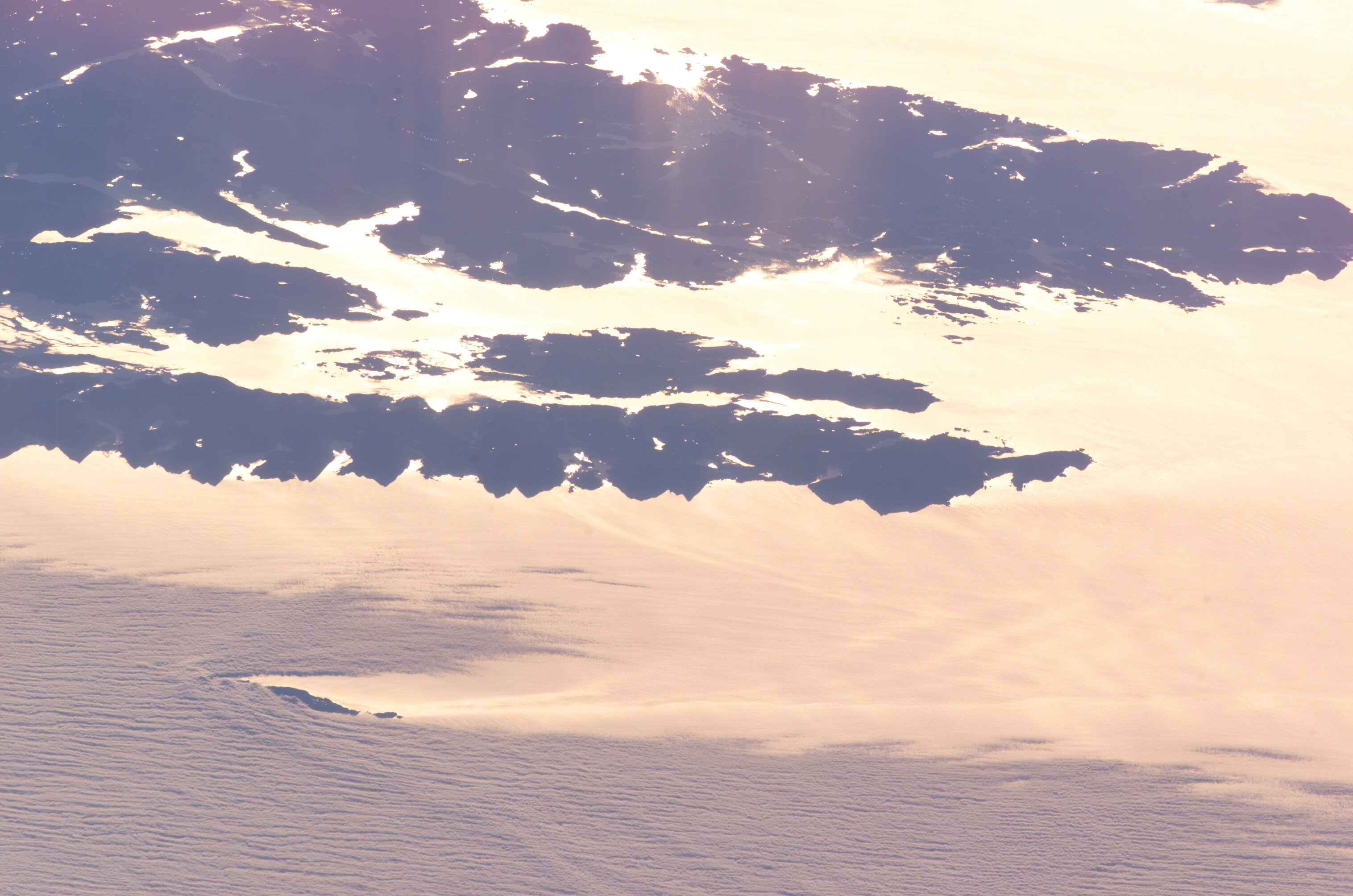
Dall Island from space, with Forrester Island in the foreground left

Forrester Island (Haida: Gasḵúu) is an island in the U.S. state of Alaska. It is located off the coast of the Alaska Panhandle, near its southernmost portion, 20 miles (32 km) west of Dall Island, in the Prince of Wales-Hyder Census Area. The island is 5.2 miles (8.4 km) long and covers an area of 3.97 sq mi (10.29 km^{2}). It is wooded and mountainous, rising 814 feet (248 m) in elevation. In 1970, the area was designated the Forrester Island Wilderness, with 2,832 acres (1,146 ha) in the National Wilderness Preservation System. It is part of the Gulf of Alaska unit of the Alaska Maritime National Wildlife Refuge.

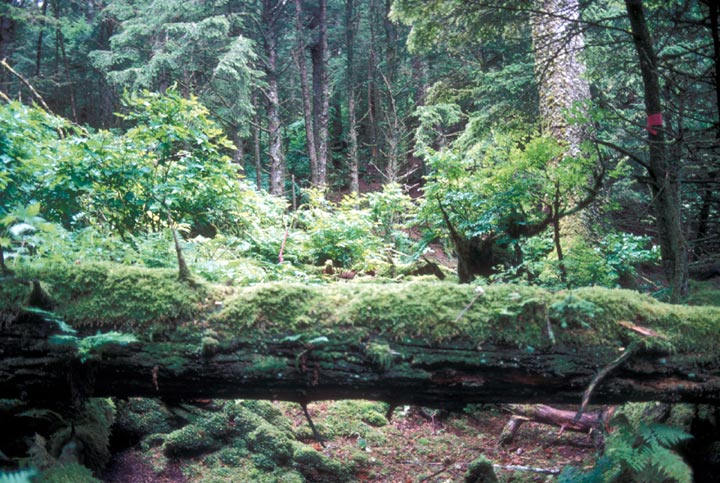
Forrester Island wilderness

Forrester Island was originally named "Santa Cristina" by Juan Pérez in 1774. In 1775, Francisco Antonio Maurelle labeled the island "San Carlos", and in 1778 William Douglas named it "Douglas Island". Royal Navy officer George Dixon named the island "Forrester Island" in 1787, which was the name adopted by George Vancouver on the Vancouver Expedition in 1793. In 1912, U.S. President William Howard Taft signed a law creating the Forrester Island Refuge, which included Forrester Island, Lowrie Island and Wolf Rock. The island hosts rookeries of Steller sea lions. The longest recorded migration of a Steller sea lion was 1,600 miles (2,600 km) between Forrester Island and Cape Newenham in Bristol Bay.

== See also ==
- List of islands of Alaska
