= Hall Island (Alaska) =

Island in the Bering Sea in Alaska

Coordinates: 60°39′50″N 173°05′46″W

Location in Alaska

The location of Hall Island above St. Matthew Island.

Hall Island (Russian: Холл) is a small island located 3.5 miles (5.6 km) to the northwest of St. Matthew Island in the Bering Sea in Alaska, United States. It serves as a haulout site for Pacific walrus. It is 5 miles (8 km) in length and has a land area of 6.2 square miles (16 km^{2}). The highest point is 1,610 feet (490 m). Hall Island is uninhabited. It is part of the Bering Sea unit of the Alaska Maritime National Wildlife Refuge and is protected as part of the Bering Sea Wilderness.

== History ==
Early Russian hunters knew this island as "Ostrov Morzhovoy" ('Walrus Island') (Tevenkov, 1852, mpa 20). The Imperial Russian Hydrographic Department Chart 1427 called it "Ostrov Sindsha" probably for Lt. Sind, its alleged discoverer, in 1764.

Commodore Joseph Billings of the Imperial Russian Navy and Lt. Gavril Sarychev anchored between this island and St. Matthew on July 14, 1791 (O.S.). Since 1875, this island has been called "Hall" on American maps, presumably for Lt. Robert Hall, who was with Captain Billings, or also for Cape Hall.

== Gallery ==
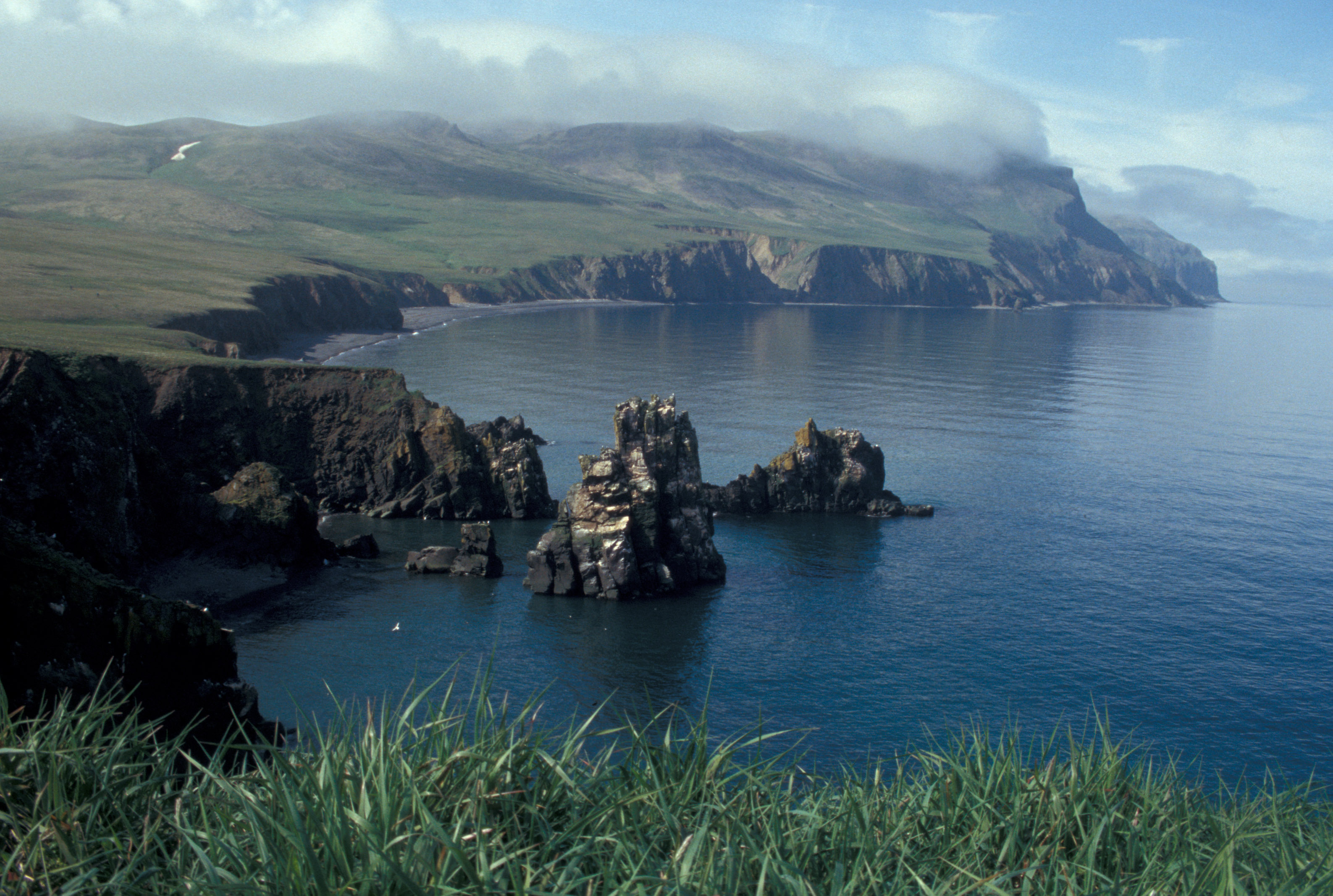
Hall Island

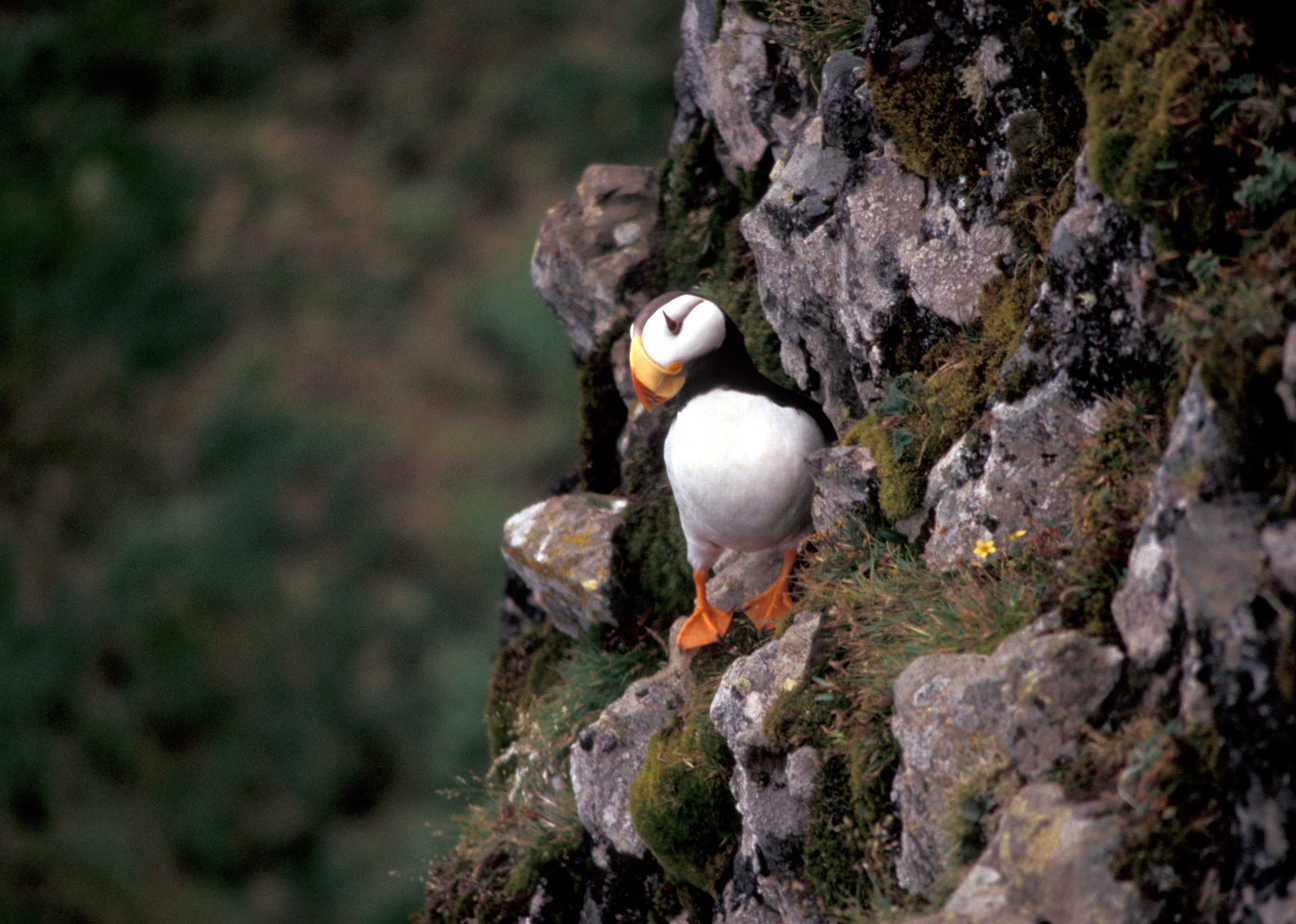
Horned puffin on Hall Island

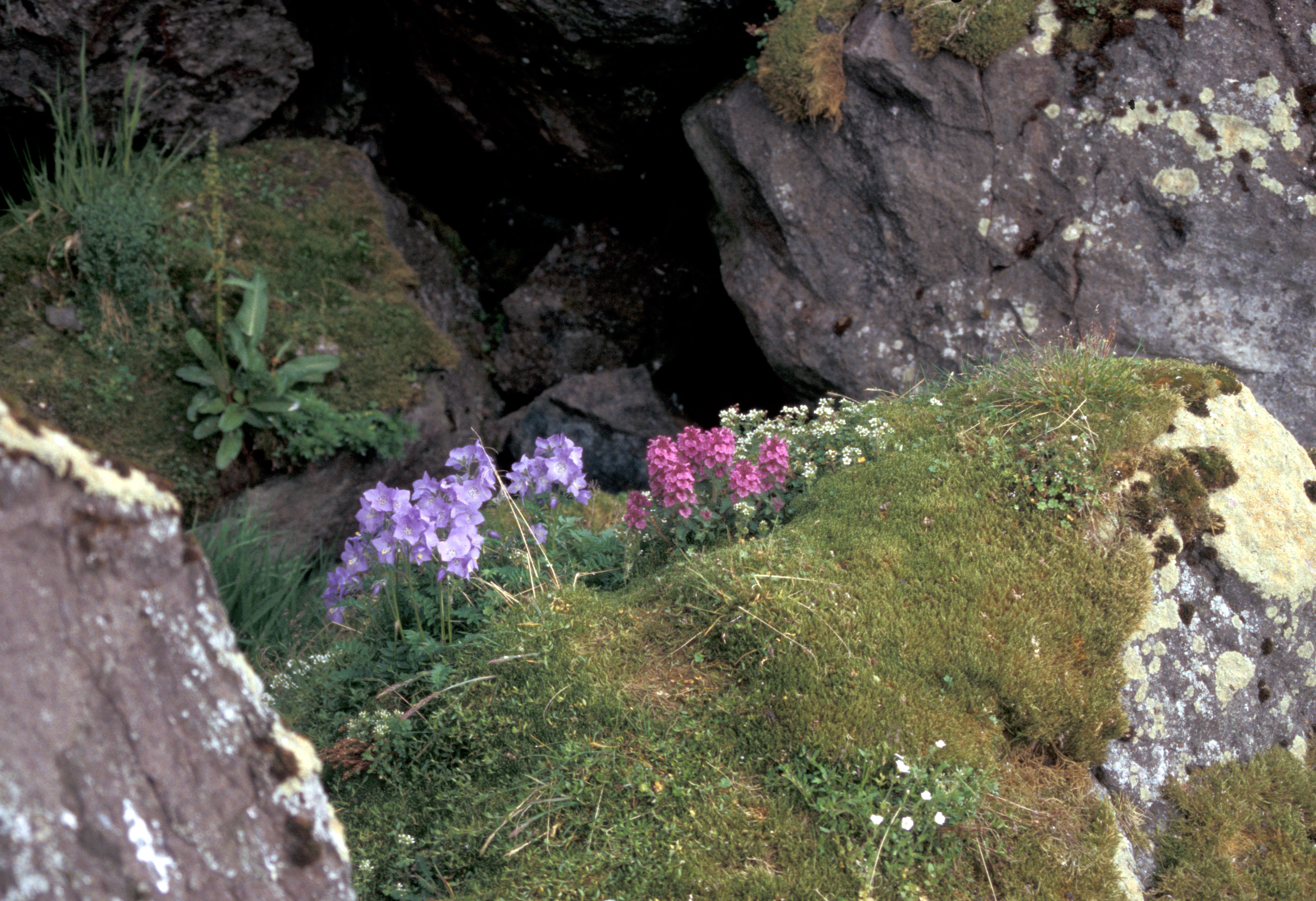
Jacob's ladder and lousewort in an auklet colony on Hall Island

== See also ==
- List of mountain peaks of North America
  - List of mountain peaks of the United States
    - List of mountain peaks of Alaska
