= Henry Matthew Adam =

British physician

- Born: 11 May 1911; London, England
- Died: 18 June 2004 (aged 93)
- Education: University of Edinburgh (MB–ChB)
- Scientific career
- Fields: Pharmacology

Henry Matthew Adam FRSE (11 May 1911 – 18 June 2004) was a British physician and pharmacologist. Earlier known for research on chemical and biological warfare, he is now mainly remembered for his research on histamines and their role in the body, especially its role in digestion.

== Early life and education ==
Adam was born in London on 11 May 1911. At this time his parents were on route from Moscow to Rome and he spent his childhood in numerous European cities including Rome, Manchester and Madrid. From 1926 the family settled in Edinburgh and there he attended George Watson's College.

He studied medicine at the University of Edinburgh, graduating MB ChB in 1935. Following his graduation he undertook postgraduate research at the University.

== Career ==
During World War II, he served with the Royal Army Medical Corps. In 1942 he was moved Porton Down to undertake research. Late in 1944 he was seconded to the Scientific Intelligence section of the US Army and was one of the first scientific officers to enter the Buchenwald concentration camp in 1945. In this exercise he was to "rescue" (from the Russians) and interview the German scientists who had been working on the artificial infection of the typhus virus through selected prisoners.

After the war he began lecturing in Pharmacology at the University of Edinburgh under Sir John Gaddum. He declined various offers of professorship in England and the United States, preferring to stay in Edinburgh, but was never offered a professorship there.

In 1954 he was elected a Fellow of the Royal Society of Edinburgh.

Adam was also the longtime editor of the British Journal of Pharmacology.

== Personal life ==
In 1940, he married biologist/zoologist Katherine Mary Galbraith Fleming. He died from colon cancer on 18 June 2004.
