= Muscarinic acetylcholine receptor =

Acetylcholine receptors named for their selective binding of muscarine

Acetylcholine - the natural agonist of muscarinic and nicotinic receptors.

Muscarine - an agonist used to distinguish between these two classes of receptors. Not normally found in the body.

Atropine - an antagonist.

Muscarinic acetylcholine receptors (mAChRs) are acetylcholine receptors that form G protein-coupled receptor complexes in the cell membranes of certain neurons and other cells. They play several roles, including acting as the main end-receptor stimulated by acetylcholine released from postganglionic fibers. They are mainly found in the parasympathetic nervous system, but also have a role in the sympathetic nervous system in the control of sweat glands.

Muscarinic receptors are so named because they are more sensitive to muscarine than to nicotine. Their counterparts are nicotinic acetylcholine receptors (nAChRs), receptor ion channels that are also important in the autonomic nervous system. Many drugs and other substances (for example pilocarpine and scopolamine) manipulate these two distinct receptors by acting as selective agonists or antagonists.

== Function ==
Acetylcholine (ACh) is a neurotransmitter found in the brain, neuromuscular junctions and the autonomic ganglia. Muscarinic receptors are used in the following roles:

=== Recovery receptors ===
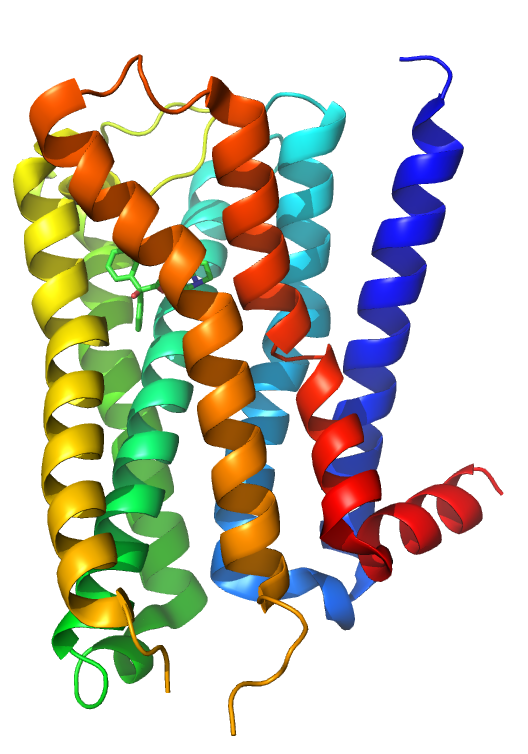
The structure of Muscarinic acetylcholine receptor M2.

ACh is always used as the neurotransmitter within the autonomic ganglion. Nicotinic receptors on the postganglionic neuron are responsible for the initial fast depolarization (Fast EPSP) of that neuron. As a consequence of this, nicotinic receptors are often cited as the receptor on the postganglionic neurons at the ganglion. However, the subsequent hyperpolarization (IPSP) and slow depolarization (Slow EPSP) that represent the recovery of the postganglionic neuron from stimulation are actually mediated by muscarinic receptors, types M_{2} and M_{1} respectively (discussed below).

Peripheral autonomic fibers (sympathetic and parasympathetic fibers) are categorized anatomically as either preganglionic or postganglionic fibers, then further generalized as either adrenergic fibers, releasing noradrenaline, or cholinergic fibers, both releasing acetylcholine and expressing acetylcholine receptors. Both preganglionic sympathetic fibers and preganglionic parasympathetic fibers are cholinergic. Most postganglionic sympathetic fibers are adrenergic: their neurotransmitter is norepinephrine except postganglionic sympathetic fibers to the sweat glands, piloerectile muscles of the body hairs, and the skeletal muscle arterioles do not use adrenaline/noradrenaline.

The adrenal medulla is considered a sympathetic ganglion and, like other sympathetic ganglia, is supplied by cholinergic preganglionic sympathetic fibers: acetylcholine is the neurotransmitter utilized at this synapse. The chromaffin cells of the adrenal medulla act as "modified neurons", releasing adrenaline and noradrenaline into the bloodstream as hormones instead of as neurotransmitters. The other postganglionic fibers of the peripheral autonomic system belong to the parasympathetic division; all are cholinergic fibers, and use acetylcholine as the neurotransmitter.

=== Postganglionic neurons ===
Another role for these receptors is at the junction of the innervated tissues and the postganglionic neurons in the parasympathetic division of the autonomic nervous system. Here acetylcholine is again used as a neurotransmitter, and muscarinic receptors form the principal receptors on the innervated tissue.

=== Innervated tissue ===
Very few parts of the sympathetic system use cholinergic receptors. In sweat glands the receptors are of the muscarinic type. The sympathetic nervous system also has some preganglionic nerves terminating at the chromaffin cells in the adrenal medulla, which secrete epinephrine and norepinephrine into the bloodstream. Some believe that chromaffin cells are modified postganglionic CNS fibers. In the adrenal medulla, acetylcholine is used as a neurotransmitter, and the receptor is of the nicotinic type.

The somatic nervous system uses a nicotinic receptor to acetylcholine at the neuromuscular junction.

=== Higher central nervous system ===
Muscarinic acetylcholine receptors are also present and distributed throughout the local nervous system, in post-synaptic and pre-synaptic positions. There is also some evidence for postsynaptic receptors on sympathetic neurons allowing the parasympathetic nervous system to inhibit sympathetic effects.

=== Presynaptic membrane of the neuromuscular junction ===
It is known that muscarinic acetylcholine receptors also appear on the pre-synaptic membrane of somatic neurons in the neuro-muscular junction, where they are involved in the regulation of acetylcholine release.

== Form of muscarinic receptors ==
Muscarinic acetylcholine receptors belong to a class of metabotropic receptors that use G proteins as their signaling mechanism. In such receptors, the signaling molecule (the ligand) binds to a monomeric receptor that has seven transmembrane regions; in this case, the ligand is ACh. This receptor is bound to intracellular proteins, known as G proteins, which begin the information cascade within the cell.

By contrast, nicotinic receptors form pentameric complexes and use a ligand-gated ion channel mechanism for signaling. In this case, binding of the ligands with the receptor causes an ion channel to open, permitting either one or more specific types of ions (e.g., K^{+}, Na^{+}, Ca^{2+}) to diffuse into or out of the cell.

== Receptor isoforms ==
=== Classification ===
By the use of selective radioactively labeled agonist and antagonist substances, five subtypes of muscarinic receptors have been determined, named M_{1}–M_{5} (using an upper case M and subscript number). M_{1}, M_{3}, M_{5} receptors are coupled with G_{q} proteins, while M_{2} and M_{4} receptors are coupled with G_{i/o} proteins. There are other classification systems. For example, the drug pirenzepine is a muscarinic antagonist (decreases the effect of ACh), which is much more potent at M_{1} receptors than it is at other subtypes. The acceptance of the various subtypes proceeded in numerical order, therefore, earlier sources may recognize only M_{1} and M_{2} subtypes, while later studies recognize M_{3}, M_{4}, and most recently M_{5} subtypes.

=== Genetic differences ===
Meanwhile, geneticists and molecular biologists have characterised five genes that appear to encode muscarinic receptors, named m1-m5 (lowercase m; no subscript number). They code for pharmacologic types M_{1}-M_{5}. The receptors m1 and m2 were determined based upon partial sequencing of M_{1} and M_{2} receptor proteins. The others were found by searching for homology, using bioinformatic techniques.

=== Difference in G proteins ===
G proteins contain an alpha-subunit that is critical to the functioning of receptors. These subunits can take a number of forms. There are four broad classes of form of G-protein: G_{s}, G_{i}, G_{q}, and G_{12/13}. Muscarinic receptors vary in the G protein to which they are bound, with some correlation according to receptor type. G proteins are also classified according to their susceptibility to cholera toxin (CTX) and pertussis toxin (PTX, whooping cough). G_{s} and some subtypes of G_{i} (G_{αt} and G_{αg}) are susceptible to CTX. Only G_{i} is susceptible to PTX, with the exception of one subtype of G_{i} (G_{αz}) which is immune. Also, only when bound with an agonist, those G proteins normally sensitive to PTX also become susceptible to CTX.

The various G-protein subunits act differently upon secondary messengers, upregulating Phospholipases, downregulating cAMP, and so on.

Because of the strong correlations to muscarinic receptor type, CTX and PTX are useful experimental tools in investigating these receptors.

Comparison of types
Type	Gene	Function	PTX	CTX	Effectors	Agonists	Antagonists
M_{1}	CHRM1	EPSP in autonomic ganglia; In CNS activates slow after-depolarizing potentials in neurons; Strengthening long-term potentiation.; Higher cognitive processes such as learning and spatial memory.; Analgesia	no (yes)	no (yes)	G_{q} (G_{i}) (G_{s}): Slow EPSP. ↓ K^{+} conductance	acetylcholine; arecoline; oxotremorine; muscarine; carbachol; McNA343; 77-LH-28-1; Nebracetam; Desmethylclozapine	atropine; Hyoscyamine; scopolamine; Diphenhydramine; Dimenhydrinate; trospium chloride; dicycloverine; tolterodine; oxybutynin; ipratropium; mamba toxin MT7; mamba toxin MT1; mamba toxin MT2; pirenzepine; telenzepine; chlorpromazine
M_{2}	CHRM2	slow heart rate; reduce contractile forces of atrium; reduce conduction velocity of AV node; In CNS; homotropic inhibition	yes	no	G_{i} ↑ K^{+} conductance ↓ Ca^{2+} conductance	acetylcholine; arecoline; methacholine; carbachol; oxotremorine; muscarine	scopolamine; atropine; hyoscyamine; dicycloverine; Diphenhydramine; Dimenhydrinate; tolterodine; oxybutynin; ipratropium; trospium chloride; methoctramine; tripitramine; gallamine; chlorpromazine
M_{3}	CHRM3	smooth muscle contraction; bronchoconstriction and increased lung secretion.; Increase intracellular calcium in vascular endothelium; increased endocrine and exocrine gland secretions, e.g. salivary glands and stomach; Increased gastrointestinal motility; In CNS; Eye accommodation; miosis when M3 is stimulated or mydriasis otherwise.; Iris sphincter muscle; cerebral vascular vasodilation and/or systemic vascular vasodilation depending on the location of M3.; induce emesis	no	no	G_{q}	acetylcholine; arecoline; bethanechol; carbachol; oxotremorine; pilocarpine (in eye)	scopolamine; atropine; hyoscyamine; Diphenhydramine; Dimenhydrinate; dicycloverine; tolterodine; oxybutynin; ipratropium; darifenacin; tiotropium; trospium chloride
M_{4}	CHRM4	Activation of M4 causes decreased locomotion; In CNS; In erythroid progenitor cell in peripheral tissue; Targeting M4 treats myelodysplastic syndrome and anemia	yes	?	G_{i} ↑ K^{+} conductance ↓ Ca^{2+} conductance	acetylcholine; arecoline; carbachol; oxotremorine	scopolamine; atropine; Diphenhydramine; trospium chloride; Dimenhydrinate; dicycloverine; tolterodine; oxybutynin; ipratropium; mamba toxin MT1; mamba toxin MT2; mamba toxin MT3
M_{5}	CHRM5	In CNS	no	?	G_{q}	acetylcholine; carbachol; oxotremorine	atropine; Diphenhydramine; Dimenhydrinate; dicycloverine; tolterodine; oxybutynin; ipratropium; trospium chloride

The muscarinic acetylcholine receptor subtype selectivities of a large number of antimuscarinic drugs have been reviewed.

=== M_{1} receptor ===
This receptor is found mediating slow EPSP at the ganglion in the postganglionic nerve, is common in exocrine glands and in the CNS.

It is predominantly found bound to G proteins of class G_{q}, which use upregulation of phospholipase C and, therefore, inositol trisphosphate and intracellular calcium as a signaling pathway. A receptor so bound would not be susceptible to CTX or PTX. However, G_{i} (causing a downstream decrease in cAMP) and G_{s} (causing an increase in cAMP) have also been shown to be involved in interactions in certain tissues, and so would be susceptible to PTX and CTX, respectively.

=== M_{2} receptor ===
The M_{2} muscarinic receptors are located in the heart and lungs. In the heart, they act to slow the heart rate down below the normal baseline sinus rhythm, by slowing the speed of depolarization. In humans, under resting conditions, vagal activity dominates over sympathetic activity. Hence, inhibition of M_{2} receptors (e.g. by atropine) will cause a raise in heart rate. They also moderately reduce contractile forces of the atrial cardiac muscle, and reduce conduction velocity of the atrioventricular node (AV node). It also serves to slightly decrease the contractile forces of the ventricular muscle.

M_{2} muscarinic receptors act via a G_{i} type receptor, which causes a decrease in cAMP in the cell, inhibition of voltage-gated Ca^{2+} channels, and increasing efflux of K^{+}, in general, leading to inhibitory-type effects.

=== M_{3} receptor ===
The M_{3} muscarinic receptors are located at many places in the body. They are located in the smooth muscles of the blood vessels, as well as in the lungs. Because the M_{3} receptor is G_{q}-coupled and mediates an increase in intracellular calcium, it typically causes contraction of smooth muscle, such as that observed during bronchoconstriction and bladder voiding. However, with respect to vasculature, activation of M_{3} on vascular endothelial cells causes increased synthesis of nitric oxide, which diffuses to adjacent vascular smooth muscle cells and causes their relaxation, thereby explaining the paradoxical effect of parasympathomimetics on vascular tone and bronchiolar tone. Indeed, direct stimulation of vascular smooth muscle, M_{3} mediates vasoconstriction in diseases wherein the vascular endothelium is disrupted. The M_{3} receptors are also located in many glands, which help to stimulate secretion in, for example, the salivary glands, as well as other glands of the body.

Like the M_{1} muscarinic receptor, M_{3} receptors are G proteins of class G_{q} that upregulate phospholipase C and, therefore, inositol trisphosphate and intracellular calcium as a signaling pathway.

=== M_{4} receptor ===
M_{4} receptors are found in the CNS. M_{4} receptors are also located in erythroid progenitor cell in peripheral tissue and modulate the cAMP pathway to regulate erythroid progenitor cell differentiation. Therapies targeting the M_{4} receptor treats myelodysplastic syndrome and anemia that are refractory to erythropoietin.

M_{4} receptors work via G_{i} receptors to decrease cAMP in the cell and, thus, produce generally inhibitory effects. Possible bronchospasm may result if stimulated by muscarinic agonists.

=== M_{5} receptor ===
Location of M_{5} receptors is not well known.

Like the M_{1} and M_{3} muscarinic receptor, M_{5} receptors are coupled with G proteins of class G_{q} that upregulate phospholipase C and, therefore, inositol trisphosphate and intracellular calcium as a signaling pathway.

== Pharmacological application ==
Ligands targeting the mAChR that are currently approved for clinical use include non-selective antagonists for the treatment of Parkinson's disease, atropine (to dilate the pupil), scopolamine (used to prevent motion sickness), and ipratropium (used in the treatment of COPD).

In 2024, the United States FDA approved the drug KarXT (Cobenfy), which is a combination drug that combines xanomeline (a preferentially acting M1/M4 muscarinic acetylcholine receptor agonist) with trospium (a peripherally-restricted pan-mAChR antagonist) for use in schizophrenia. In early clinical trials of moderate to high severity patients without treatment resistant history, it has demonstrated efficacy about equivalent to that of other anti-psychotics (20-point improvement in PANSS vs 10-point placebo improvement), with a notably different side effect profile (very low rates of metabolic effects, hypotension, weight changes, or EPS) with moderately reported rates of nausea and constipation. No trials have been published to date regarding use in combination with other antipsychotics, use in treatment resistant patients, or head-to-head comparisons with other medications. This is the first anti-psychotic drug approved that uses a muscarinic mechanism of action, and many others are in development.

== See also ==
- Muscarinic agonist
- Muscarinic antagonist
- Acetylcholine receptor (Cholinergic receptor)

- Nicotinic acetylcholine receptor

- Adrenergic receptor
- Nicotinic agonist
- Nicotinic antagonist
- Vagal escape
