= Muscarinic toxin 2 =

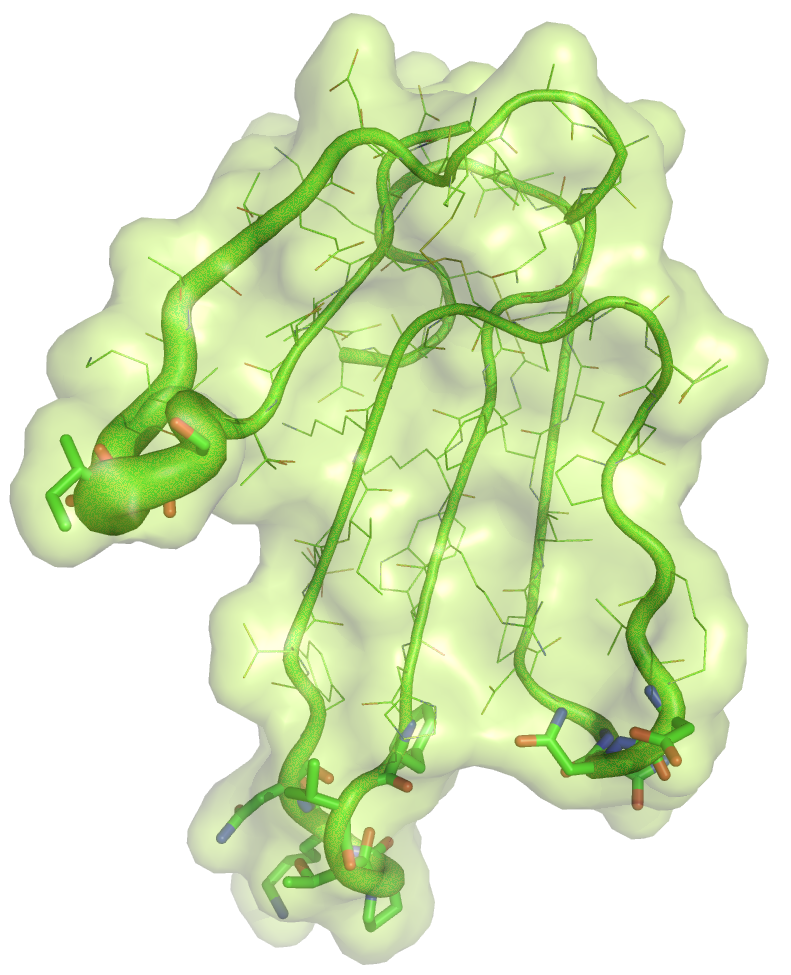
- Crystal structure of Muscarinic toxin 2 (MT2) from PDB 1FF4

Identifiers
- Symbol: MT2
- SCOP2: 1F94 / SCOPe / SUPFAM

Muscarinic toxin 2 (MT2) is one member of a family of small peptides of 65 amino acid residues of around 7076 daltons in molecular weight derived from the venom of African mamba snakes (Dendroaspis angusticeps), which target the different muscarinic receptor subtypes. Muscarinic toxins like the nicotinic toxins have the three-finger fold structure, characteristic of the large superfamily of toxins that act at cholinergic synapses. The interactions of muscarinic toxins studied using tritiated ^{3}H-N-methyl scopolamine (NMS) with human muscarinic receptor subtypes m1, m2, m3 and m4 has shown that MT2 and the related MT1 toxin are specific for M1 (Ki=630 nM) and M4 (Ki=1900 nM) receptors, but have little effect on binding to M2 and M3 receptors. The interaction at M1 receptors appears to be essentially irreversible like for muscarinic toxin 7.
