= Robert George (pharmacologist) =

American pharmacologist

- Born: February 10, 1923; Turlock, California, United States
- Died: April 13, 2006 (aged 83)
- Education: University of Oregon; University of California, Berkeley
- Partner: Helga née Meyer
- Children: 2
- Scientific career
- Institutions: University of California, San Francisco; Institute of Psychiatry, Psychology and Neuroscience; University of California, Los Angeles

Robert George (February 10, 1923 – April 13, 2006) was an American pharmacologist who specifically researched neuropharmacology and helped create the Brain Research Institute at the University of California, Los Angeles (UCLA). He spent the majority of his career at UCLA (1958–1991) and was the co-editor of the Annual Review of Pharmacology and Toxicology from 1977–1990.

== Early life and education ==
Robert George was born on February 10, 1923 in Turlock, California. His mother, Nabat, and his father, Isaac, were both emigrants from Iran to California. He had three siblings, all of whom were also born in Iran before the family emigration in 1920. His father died of an illness in 1923, a month after his birth, at the age of 32. He attended the University of Oregon, where he also played on its football team as a halfback. He then attended the University of California, Berkeley for a PhD in physiology.

== Career ==
Following his PhD, he conducted postdoctoral research under E. Leong Way at the University of California, San Francisco. He then spent another year of postdoctoral research at the Institute of Psychiatry, Psychology and Neuroscience in London with the neuroendocrinologist Geoffrey Harris, where he was funded by the National Institutes of Health. He joined the faculty of the University of California, Los Angeles in 1958, where he remained until his retirement in 1991. He became a full professor in 1967. He was a professor emeritus until his death in 2006. Within the Department of Pharmacology he was the vice-chair and graduate advisor from 1970 to 1977.

His research was primarily focused on neuropharmacology, or the research of drugs that acted on the brain. In particular, he studied analgesics (painkillers), including opiates, and their interactions with hormones produced by the thyroid, pituitary, hypothalamic, and adrenal glands. At UCLA, he helped found the Brain Research Institute. In 1971, he was appointed an associate editor at the Annual Review of Pharmacology and Toxicology; he was made the co-editor in 1977 along with Ronald Okun. George remained co-editor until 1990, at which time he was succeeded by Arthur K. Cho.

== Personal life and death ==
He married Helga née Meyer; they had a daughter, Kathleen, and a son, Philip. He died of Huntington's disease on April 13, 2006, at the age of eighty-three.
