= Insel =

Insel may refer to:

== Arts and entertainment ==
- Insel (album), a 2014 album by German band Juli
- Die Insel (disambiguation), three German magazines
- Insel: The Queen Charlotte Islands Meditations, a 1983 book by Canadian author J. Michael Yates
- Insel Verlag, a German book publisher, primarily of arts and literary material
- Insel, a novel by Mina Loy published posthumously in 1991

== People with the surname ==
- Ayşe Şekibe İnsel (1886–1970), Turkish politician
- Paul A. Insel (born 1945), American pharmacologist
- Thomas R. Insel (born 1951), American neuroscientist

== Other uses ==
- Insel, Saxony-Anhalt, a German village
- Insel Air, a Dutch Caribbean carrier
- Mount Insel, a mountain in Victoria Land, Antarctica

== See also ==
- "Eine Insel für zwei", 1961 single by American singer Connie Francis
- Entdeckung der blauen Grotte auf der Insel Capri, an 1838 German book
- Nordwestliche Insel Mountains, an Antarctic mountain range
- Rote Insel, a district in Berlin, Germany
