= Incel (disambiguation) =

Incel (a portmanteau for involuntary celibates) is a term for a member of the incelosphere, a community whose members identify as being unable to find a romantic or sexual partner despite desiring one.

Incel may also refer to:

- Incel (company), defunct paper and pulp industry firm in Banja Luka, Bosnia and Herzegovina (1954–1990s)
- Incel, a trade name for Biricodar, an unreleased pharmaceutical drug
- /r/incels, a banned Reddit community for incels

== See also ==
- Insel (disambiguation)
