= C12H20N2 =

The molecular formula C_{12}H_{20}N_{2} (molar mass: 192.30 g/mol, exact mass: 192.1626 u) may refer to:

- Amiflamine (FLA-336)
- Tremorine
