= Jonathan E. Mangum =

Australian biomedical scientist

Jonathan E. Mangum is an Australian biomedical scientist, entrepreneur, and executive known for his contributions to translational proteomics and the development of diagnostic technologies in oral health. He is a co-founder of Incisive Technologies and the scientific lead behind BlueCheck, a diagnostic tool for early detection of dental caries, which received FDA clearance in 2023.

== Early life and education ==
Mangum earned his Bachelor and Master of Science degrees in Biochemistry from the University of Otago in New Zealand (1995–2000). He completed a PhD in Biomedical Sciences at the University of Melbourne in 2013. He also holds a Graduate Certificate in Commercialisation from Melbourne Business School.

== Academic career ==
Mangum co-founded the Melbourne Research Unit for Facial Disorders at the Royal Children's Hospital and the University of Melbourne. He was Peter Doherty Fellow and Head of the Translational Proteomics Laboratory from 2014 to 2020, contributing to fields including dental enamel research, cerebrospinal fluid biomarker discovery, and metastatic cancer resistance mechanisms.

He has published over 30 peer-reviewed articles and is listed as inventor on more than 20 patents internationally.

== Industry leadership ==
Mangum co-founded Incisive Technologies in 2012 and led the development of its lead product, BlueCheck™, from initial research through to GMP manufacturing and market clearance. He was Chief Executive Officer (2018–2021) and Chief Scientific Officer (2018–2024), overseeing regulatory strategy, manufacturing scale-up, clinical trials, and scientific marketing. He designed the company's ISO 13485–certified Melbourne facility and led successful funding rounds totalling over AUD $20 million.

== Recognition and awards ==
- NHMRC Peter Doherty Biomedical Fellowship (2014)
- Minimum Intervention Dentistry Research Award, ADRF (2015)
- Commonwealth Scholarship for Commercialisation Studies

== Selected publications ==
- Hubbard MJ, Mangum JE, Perez VA, Williams R. A breakthrough in understanding the pathogenesis of molar hypomineralisation: the mineralisation-poisoning model. Frontiers in physiology. 2021;12:802833.
- Li M, Keenan CR, Lopez-Campos G, et al. A non-canonical pathway with potential for safer modulation of transforming growth factor-β1 in steroid-resistant airway diseases. Iscience. 2019;12:232-246.
- Lippert F, Eder JS, Eckert GJ, Mangum J, Hegarty K. Detection of artificial enamel caries-like lesions with a blue hydroxyapatite-binding porosity probe. Journal of Dentistry. 2023;135:104601.
- Gorasia DG PA Dudek NL, Safavi Hemami H, Perez RA, Schittenhelm RB, Saunders PM, Wee S, Mangum JE, Hubbard MJ. A prominent role of PDIA6 in processing of misfolded proinsulin. Biochim Biophys Acta. 2016;1864(6):715-723.
- Jayamanoharan S, Mangum JE, Stylli S, Ziogas J, Adamides AA. Association between elevated cerebrospinal fluid D-dimer levels and delayed cerebral ischaemia after aneurysmal subarachnoid haemorrhage. Journal of Clinical Neuroscience. 2020;76:177-182.
- Hopkins K, Price B, Ziogas J, Adamides A, Mangum J. Comparative proteomic analysis of ventricular and cisternal cerebrospinal fluid in haemorrhagic stroke patients. Journal of Clinical Neuroscience. 2023;107:84-90.
- Hopkins K, Mukherjee S, Ponce D, Mangum J, Jacobson LH, Hoyer D. Development of a LC-ESI-MRM method for the absolute quantification of orexin A in the CSF of individual mice. Medicine in Drug Discovery. 2021;11:100102.
- Alexander SP, Roberts RE, Broughton BR, et al. Goals and practicalities of immunoblotting and immunohistochemistry: A guide for submission to the British Journal of Pharmacology. British journal of pharmacology. 2018;175(3):407.
- Hubbard MJ, Mangum JE, Perez VA, Nervo GJ. Molar hypomineralisation: a call to arms for enamel researchers. Frontiers in physiology. 2017;8:272611.
- Mangum JE, Farlie PG, Hubbard MJ. Proteomic profiling of facial development in chick embryos. Proteomics. 2005;5(10):2542-2550.
- Mangum J, Crombie F, Kilpatrick N, Manton D, Hubbard M. Surface integrity governs the proteome of hypomineralized enamel. Journal of dental research. 2010;89(10):1160-1165.

== Patents ==
Mangum is the named inventor on numerous patents, including:

- US Patent 15/422,996 (2019)
- European Patent 11755567.2 (2019)
- Australian Patent PCT/AU2011/000303 (2016)
