= Libby Beaman =

American naturalist (1844–1934)

- Born: Elizabeth Gertrude DuBois; 1844; Great Bend, Pennsylvania
- Died: 1934 (aged 89–90); Cincinnati, Ohio
- Other name: Libby Beaman

Elizabeth Beaman (1844-1934), also known by her maiden name Elizabeth Gertrude DuBois, claimed to be the first non-Aleut woman to go to the Pribilof Islands off the coast of Alaska, although she was not. She was a naturalist, artist, mapmaker, and writer. Her year spent in Alaska produced a diary in which she wrote about her experiences during seal season. Not much is known of Beaman's later life, but her contributions to documenting her time in Alaska has established her as a woman who overcame societal norms and expectations.

== Early life ==
Born Elizabeth Gertrude DuBois in Great Bend, Pennsylvania, in 1844, she was the eldest child of Nicholas and Louise DuBois. Her father was a civil engineer by training but a government official by career. For two years, Libby and her family lived at Mount Vernon while her father oversaw the restoration of George Washington's home. Her father worked under presidents James K. Polk, Zachary Taylor, and was well acquainted with Abraham Lincoln. She had a passion for art and attended the Corcoran School of Art. Beaman was given the opportunity to work for her father as a mapmaker, at a time when the United States' borders were expanding. Unbeknownst to Beaman, she would work on details of a map of the Alaska Purchase in which she would draw Saint Paul Island (Alaska) and St. George Island (Alaska), her future home for a year. As part of her introduction in her diary, Beaman described herself as a tall, slim woman with an eighteen inch waist, with pale skin, long dark hair, and blue-gray eyes.

== Marriage and family ==
During the Civil War, Libby volunteered to be an attendant in the Confederate hospital in Hallowell, Maine. While there, she met prisoner John Warren Beaman (1845-1903). The two married in 1874, ten years after their first meeting. On November 26, 1880, Libby and John welcomed their son, Charles Worcester Beaman, in Washington, D.C.

== Life in Alaska ==
In 1878, Beaman met with president Rutherford B. Hayes in Takoma Park, Maryland, to ask him to provide a job for her husband. Beaman knew that this request was out of the ordinary for women, but he assigned her husband a two-year position as an assistant special agent for the Treasury Department. Her husband was to oversee the seal industry in the newly acquired Alaskan territory. President Hayes had explained to Beaman that the supervision of seal pelts was important as it provided a substantial income for the United States government. In 1879, Beaman and her husband went to San Francisco where they sailed to the largest of the Pribilof Islands, St Paul's Island.

Beaman kept detailed accounts of the life cycle, mating season, and hunting of seals. She chronicled the interactions of bulls, bachelors, and cows, making note of their docile character and remaining on the islands from May until August. She recognized that fur seals were unique to the Pribilof Islands and had been at risk for extinction when the Dutch, Portuguese, English, and French were overhunting male and female seals. Beaman never agreed with the hunting of seals for their pelts, yet she was acutely aware that the islands could not support the abundance of these mammals. While on St Paul's Island, Beaman met Henry Wood Elliott where he noted her ability to capture the nature of the island. Unknown as to why, Beaman's nature sketches and paintings are not all accessible to the public, yet her detailed botanical and zoological work described by her husband and included in her journal attest to her ability to connect with and capture the arctic wilderness. At the time, it was quite unusual for a woman to travel with her husband to a remote island, but Beaman's skills in art, nursing, and mapmaking justified her presence. Over the course of the year spent in Alaska, Beaman kept a diary, later published by her granddaughter Betty John titled Libby: The Alaskan Diaries and Letters of Libby Beaman, 1879-1880.

== Historian and scholar depiction ==
Historians and scholars discuss Beaman as a woman who helped to establish a new social role for women in a masculine dominated landscape. The nineteenth century was a time when women were excluded from participating in nature and exploration of the wild American landscape, yet Beaman's boldness has identified her as woman who contributed to nature and the sciences, going against popular culture. Beaman's personal work allowed her the freedom to explore her own thoughts and ideas of how to establish and justify her presence on the island. Beaman's experience on the islands gave women, such as Anne Morrow Lindbergh and Josephine Diebitsch Peary, the opportunity to write a new narrative for themselves in which their personal work could help establish themselves as contributors to unknown and unmarked regions. The publishing of Elizabeth Beaman's diary has helped to encourage women to find their voice and add their unique history and contributions to the changing narrative of women.

== Later life ==
Upon their return from Alaska, Beaman and her husband moved back to Washington D.C. Shortly after the birth of their son, the Beaman's moved to Jefferson City, Missouri, until her husband, John, resigned as an engineer and returned to Washington, D.C., in 1895. After the death of her husband in 1903, Libby moved to Cincinnati, Ohio, to live with her son and his family.

She died on May 8, 1934, at the age of ninety.
