= Henry Wood Elliott II =

American physician, pharmacologist and anesthesiologist

Henry W. Elliott
- Born: April 10, 1920; Seattle, Washington
- Died: August 1, 1976 (aged 56); Santa Ana, California
- Education: University of Washington; Stanford University; University of California, San Francisco
- Partner: Donna née Dell (m. 1947)
- Children: 4
- Scientific career
- Institutions: University of California, San Francisco; University of California, Irvine

Notes
- Henry Wood Elliott (grandfather)

Henry Wood Elliott II (April 10, 1920–August 1, 1976) was an American physician, pharmacologist, and anesthesiologist. He was the chairman of the Department of Medical Pharmacology and Therapeutics at University of California, Irvine from 1968 to 1976 and the editor of the Annual Review of Pharmacology from 1965–1976.

== Early life and education ==
Henry Wood Elliott II was born on April 10, 1920, in Seattle, Washington. His parents were Therese née Pariseau, a French Canadian immigrant to the US, and Lionel Henry Elliott, a florist. He had a younger sister, Marsha. His grandfather for whom he was named, Henry Wood Elliott, was an artist and conservationist.

He attended the University of Washington for his bachelor's and master's degrees, both in chemistry. After receiving a PhD from Stanford University in 1946, he attended the University of California, San Francisco (UCSF) for his Doctor of Medicine, graduating in 1953.

== Career ==
Upon finishing his MD, he stayed at UCSF, becoming a full professor pharmacology in 1964. In 1968, he accepted a position at the University of California, Irvine (UCI) as the chair of the Department of Medical Pharmacology and Therapeutics. He remained the chair and a professor at UCI until his death in 1976. He was the last president of the American Society of Clinical Pharmacology and Chemotherapy before it merged with the American Therapeutics Society. He was the first president of the resulting organization, the American Society for Clinical Pharmacology and Therapeutics. From 1965–1976, he was the editor of the Annual Review of Pharmacology.

Elliott was the chair of the board of directors of the Solano Institute for Medical and Pharmacological Research (SIMPR), which proposed pharmaceutical research projects to the California Department of Corrections and Rehabilitation for testing on prisoners. The California Office of Auditor General noted that Elliott's roles at UCI and SIMPR meant he was simultaneously developing research projects for the pharmaceutical industry at UCI and approving and conducting the projects at SIMPR. From 1973–1976, Elliott was one of four physicians in California responsible for nearly all pharmaceutical testing on prisoners in the state.

== Awards and honors ==
In 1967, he was elected as a fellow of the American College of Anesthesiology. Elliott is the namesake of the Henry W. Elliott Distinguished Service Award, which was created by the American Society for Clinical Pharmacology and Therapeutics in 1979.

== Personal life and death ==
He married Donna née Dell in 1947. They had four children together. He died of an apparent heart attack on August 1, 1976, at his home in Santa Ana, California, at the age of fifty-six.
