= Pribilof Fur Seal Monument =

Monument in Pribilof Islands, Alaska, US

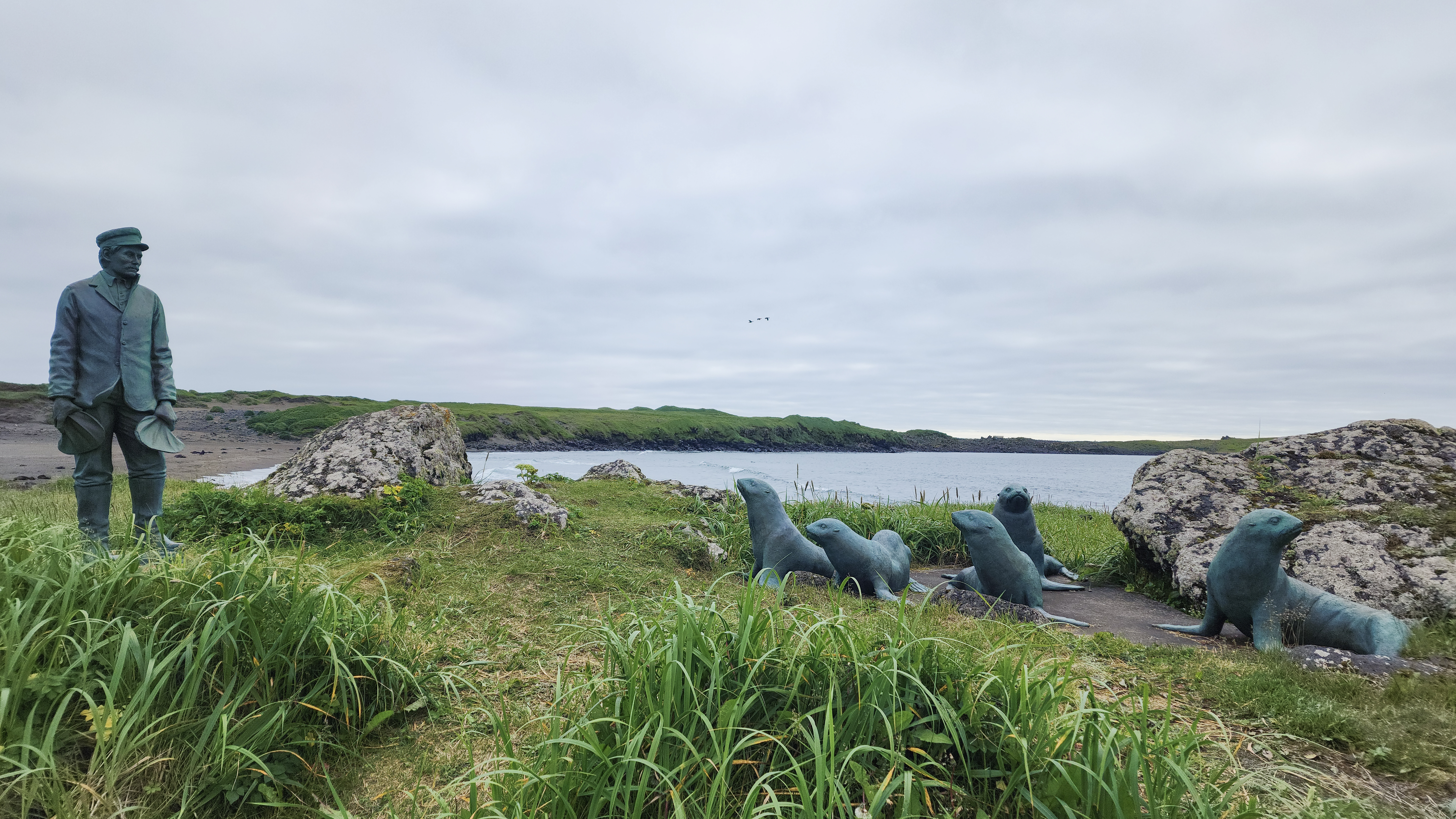
The monument in 2025

The Pribilof Fur Seal Monument is a tribute to the Aleut sealers of the Pribilof Islands in the Bering Sea of Alaska. The monument was unveiled on St. Paul Island on the 100th Anniversary of the signing of the North Pacific Fur Seal Convention of 1911.
