= Arthur K. Cho =

American pharmacologist

- Born: November 7, 1928 (age 97); Oakland, California
- Citizenship: US
- Education: University of California, Berkeley; Oregon State University; University of California, Los Angeles
- Partner: Sachiko Yoshida
- Children: 2
- Scientific career
- Institutions: University of California, Los Angeles; Don Baxter Inc.; National Heart Institute

Arthur Kenji Cho (born November 7, 1928) is an American pharmacologist. He spent the majority of his career at the University of California, Los Angeles, where he remains a professor emeritus. Two of his major areas of research include amphetamine pharmacology and air pollution toxicology. He was the editor of the Annual Review of Pharmacology and Toxicology from 1991 to 2007.

== Early life and education ==
Arthur Kenji Cho was born in Oakland, California, on November 7, 1928, to parents Iwao Cho and Mary Yoshiko née Takata. He had an older sister, Edith. In 1945, he and his sister were deprived of their property through the Office of Alien Property Custodian as nationals of a foreign enemy country, despite both being American citizens. In 1951, he and Edith successfully applied for the return of their assets.

He attended the University of California, Berkeley, graduating with a bachelor's degree in chemistry. His mentor at Berkeley was chemist Henry Rapoport. For his master's in chemistry, he attended Oregon State University. His master's thesis was on the chemical composition of Douglas fir bark. He completed his PhD under Theodore Geissman at the University of California, Los Angeles, also in chemistry.

== Career ==
Upon completion of his PhD, he worked as a postdoctoral fellow at UCLA, researching organic chemistry. While there, he worked with Willford Haslett to isolate and name oxotremorine, a metabolite of tremorine.

He then worked for Don Baxter Inc. in Glendale, California, as a research chemist from 1961 to 1965. From 1965 to 1970, he was a research chemist at the National Heart Institute in Bethesda, Maryland. In 1970, he accepted a position to join the faculty at UCLA. In 1974, he was promoted to full professor of pharmacology. He was the editor of the Annual Review of Pharmacology and Toxicology from 1991 to 2007. His research interests include the pharmacology of amphetamines and air pollution toxicology.

He continued to conduct research after his retirement from UCLA. In 2009 he was awarded the Dickson Emeritus Professorship for continued scholarly achievement and educational services post-retirement.

== Personal life ==
He married Sachiko Yoshida on August 16, 1953. They had two children, David and Nancy.
