= Oxotremorine =

Chemical compound

Clinical data
- Pregnancy category: C
- Routes of administration: Oral, intravenous
- ATC code: none

Legal status
- Legal status: US: Experimental/not yet approved

Identifiers
- IUPAC name: 1-(4-Pyrrolidin-1-ylbut-2-yn-1-yl)pyrrolidin-2-one
- CAS Number: 70-22-4
- IUPHAR/BPS: 302
- ChemSpider: 4469
- UNII: 5RY0UWH1JL
- ChEMBL: ChEMBL7634
- CompTox Dashboard (EPA): DTXSID10220252
- ECHA InfoCard: 100.000.662

Chemical and physical data
- Formula: C_{12}H_{18}N_{2}O
- Molar mass: 206.289 g·mol^{−1}
- 3D model (JSmol): Interactive image
- SMILES: C1CCN(C1)CC#CCN2CCCC2=O
- InChI: InChI=InChI=1S/C12H18N2O/c15-12-6-5-11-14(12)10-4-3-9-13-7-1-2-8-13/h1-2,5-11H2; Key:RSDOPYMFZBJHRL-UHFFFAOYSA-N

Oxotremorine is a drug that acts as a selective muscarinic acetylcholine receptor agonist. More precisely, oxotremorine is a muscarinic agonist at all 5 muscarinic receptors. It is the active metabolite of tremorine. Oxotremorine causes tremors which is a characteristic symptom observed in Parkinson’s disease

Oxotremorine also produces antipsychotic-like effects.

== See also ==
- Tremorine
