= Paul A. Insel =

American physician and pharmacologist

- Born: 1945 (age 80–81); New York City, United States
- Education: George Washington University; University of Michigan
- Children: 2
- Scientific career
- Institutions: Boston City Hospital; National Institutes of Health; University of California, San Francisco; University of California, San Diego

Notes
- Thomas R. Insel (brother)

Paul Anthony Insel (born 1945) is an American physician and pharmacologist. He has been the chief editor of four academic journals and is an elected fellow of the American Association for the Advancement of Science, American Society for Pharmacology and Experimental Therapeutics, and American Physiological Society. His research is primarily focused on G proteins.

== Early life and education ==
Paul Anthony Insel was born in 1945 in New York City to parents H. Herbert Insel and Ruth Leona née Friedman. He has three brothers, Richard, Jonathan, and Thomas R. Insel. He grew up in Dayton, Ohio and the outskirts of Washington, D.C. He attended George Washington University for two years before attending the University of Michigan, where he graduated with his Doctor of Medicine in 1968.

== Career ==
He completed an internship and residency with Harvard University at Boston City Hospital after finishing his MD; he worked at Boston City Hospital until 1970. He then worked at the National Institutes of Health at the National Institute of Child Health and Human Development and Gerontology Research Center from 1970 to 1974. His next position was at the University of California, San Francisco as a research fellow and associate professor in pharmacology. Insel joined the faculty of the University of California, San Diego (UCSD) in 1978, where he has taught and researched to present day. He became a full professor at UCSD in 1987. He is the Distinguished Professor of Pharmacology and Medicine and one of the co-directors of the UCSD Medical Scientist (MD/PhD) Training Program. From 2017 to 2019 he was a Distinguished Scientist at the Merck & Co. laboratory in San Francisco.

Insel primarily researches G proteins, including G protein-coupled receptors, heterotrimeric G-proteins and G protein-regulated effectors. He succeeded Arthur K. Cho as the editor of the Annual Review of Pharmacology and Toxicology in 2008. He has also been the chief editor of the Journal of Clinical Investigation, Molecular Pharmacology, and American Journal of Physiology Cell Physiology.

== Awards and honors ==
Insel was elected as a fellow of the British Pharmacological Society in 2017. He also has an honorary doctorate from the University of Paris. In 2019, he was elected as a fellow of the American Society for Pharmacology and Experimental Therapeutics. He is additionally a fellow of the American Association for the Advancement of Science and American Physiological Society, and is an elected member of the American Society for Clinical Investigation and Association of American Physicians.

== Personal life ==
His first marriage was to Lola Steinbaum in 1968. He later married Louise née Rausa, a psychiatric nurse, in 1977. The couple had two daughters and divorced by 1993.
