= Annual Review of Pharmacology and Toxicology =

- Discipline: Pharmacology, toxicology
- Language: English
- Edited by: Amrita Ahluwalia, Susan G. Amara, Paul A. Insel

Publication details
- Former name: Annual Review of Pharmacology
- History: 1961–present
- Publisher: Annual Reviews (US)
- Frequency: Annually
- Open access: Subscribe to Open
- Impact factor: 19.0 (2025)

Standard abbreviations
- ISO 4: Annu. Rev. Pharmacol. Toxicol.

Indexing
- CODEN: ARPTDI
- ISSN: 0362-1642 (print); 1545-4304 (web)
- OCLC no.: 166001446

Links
- Journal homepage

The Annual Review of Pharmacology and Toxicology is a peer-reviewed academic journal that publishes review articles about pharmacology and toxicology. It was first published in 1961 as the Annual Review of Pharmacology, changing its name in 1976 to the present title. As of 2023, Annual Review of Pharmacology and Toxicology is being published as open access, under the Subscribe to Open model. As of 2026, Journal Citation Reports lists the journal's 2025 impact factor as 19.0, ranking it first of 106 journal titles in the category "Toxicology" and sixth of 356 titles in the category "Pharmacology & Pharmacy".

== History ==
The Annual Review of Pharmacology was first published in 1961 by Annual Reviews (AR), a nonprofit organization whose stated mission is to synthesize knowledge "for the progress of science and the benefit of society." The journal's founding editor was Windsor C. Cutting, who was also the founding editor of AR's Annual Review of Medicine in 1950. Its initial editorial committee overlapped with that of Pharmacological Reviews so that the two journals would not duplicate each other's efforts. In 1976 its name was changed to its current version, the Annual Review of Pharmacology and Toxicology.

It defines its scope as covering various aspects of pharmacology and toxicology, including biochemical receptors, transporters, enzymes, drug development, the immune system, central and autonomic nervous systems, gastrointestinal system, cardiovascular system, endocrine system, and respiratory system. It is abstracted and indexed in Scopus, Science Citation Index Expanded, MEDLINE, Aquatic Sciences and Fisheries Abstracts, and Academic Search, among others.

== Editorial processes ==
The Annual Review of Pharmacology and Toxicology is helmed by the editor or the co-editors. The editor is assisted by the editorial committee, which includes associate editors, regular members, and occasionally guest editors. Guest members participate at the invitation of the editor, and serve terms of one year. All other members of the editorial committee are appointed by the AR board of directors and serve five-year terms. The editorial committee determines which topics should be included in each volume and solicits reviews from qualified authors. Unsolicited manuscripts are not accepted. Peer review of accepted manuscripts is undertaken by the editorial committee.

=== Editors of volumes ===
Dates indicate publication years in which someone was credited as a lead editor or co-editor of a journal volume. The planning process for a volume begins well before the volume appears, so appointment to the position of lead editor generally occurred prior to the first year shown here. An editor who has retired or died may be credited as a lead editor of a volume that they helped to plan, even if it is published after their retirement or death.

- Windsor C. Cutting (1961–1964)
- Henry W. Elliott (1965–1976)
- Robert George and Ronald Okun (1977–1989)
- Robert George (1990)
- Arthur K. Cho (1991–2012)
- Paul A. Insel (2013–present)
- Insel, Amrita Ahluwalia and Susan G. Amara

== See also ==
- List of pharmaceutical sciences journals
