= Jamie A. Davies =

- Education: University of Cambridge
- Known for: Organogenesis
- Scientific career
- Fields: Experimental Anatomy
- Workplaces: University of Edinburgh

Jamie A. Davies FRSE FLSW is a British scientist, professor of experimental anatomy at the University of Edinburgh, and leader of a laboratory in its Centre for Integrative Physiology. He works in the fields of Developmental biology, Synthetic biology, and Tissue engineering. He is principal investigator for the IUPHAR/BPS Guide to Pharmacology database.

== Biography ==
Davies attended Prince Henry's High School, Evesham, and Christ's College, Cambridge, and received his BA, MA, and, in 1989, PhD from the University of Cambridge. He then took up post doctoral fellowships first at the University of Manchester, and then at the University of Southampton before being appointed to Edinburgh. He was initially appointed in 1995 as a lecturer, rising to senior lecturer, reader, and finally professor.

Davies was the founding editor of the journal Organogenesis and is on the editorial boards of Journal of Anatomy, and Nephron. He is a fellow of the Royal Society of Edinburgh, the Royal Society of Biology, the Royal Society of Medicine, a Principal Fellow of the Higher Education Academy and, though his 'other life' as a dance teacher, a Fellow of the Royal Society of Arts. He is a member of the Institute of Electrical and Electronics Engineers. He was on the board of the National Centre for 3Rs from 2009 to 2014, and deputy chair from 2012.

In 2021, Davies was awarded the inaugural Wolpert Medal by the British Society for Developmental Biology for outstanding contributions to the teaching and communication of developmental biology. In 2023, Davies was elected a Fellow of the Learned Society of Wales.

== Books ==
- Davies J.A. (2004) Branching Morphogenesis. Springer.
- Davies J.A. (2004) Mechanisms of Morphogenesis. Elsevier/ Academic Press
- Davies J.A. (2012) Replacing animal models: a practical guide to creating and using culture-based biomimetic alternatives. Wiley-Blackwell.
- Davies J.A. (2012) Tissue Regeneration. InTech.
- Davies J.A. (2013) Mechanisms of Morphogenesis (2nd Edition). Elsevier/ Academic Press.
- Davies J.A. (2014) Life Unfolding. Oxford University Press.
- Davies J.A. (2018) Synthetic Biology: A Very Short Introduction. Oxford University Press.
- Davies J.A. & Lawrence M.L. (2018) Organoids and Mini-organs. Academic Press.
- Davies J.A. (2020) Synthetic biology in mammals . Oxford University Press
- Davies J.A. (2021) Human Physiology: A Very Short Introduction. Oxford University Press.
