= Susan Amara =

American neuroscientist

Susan G. Amara
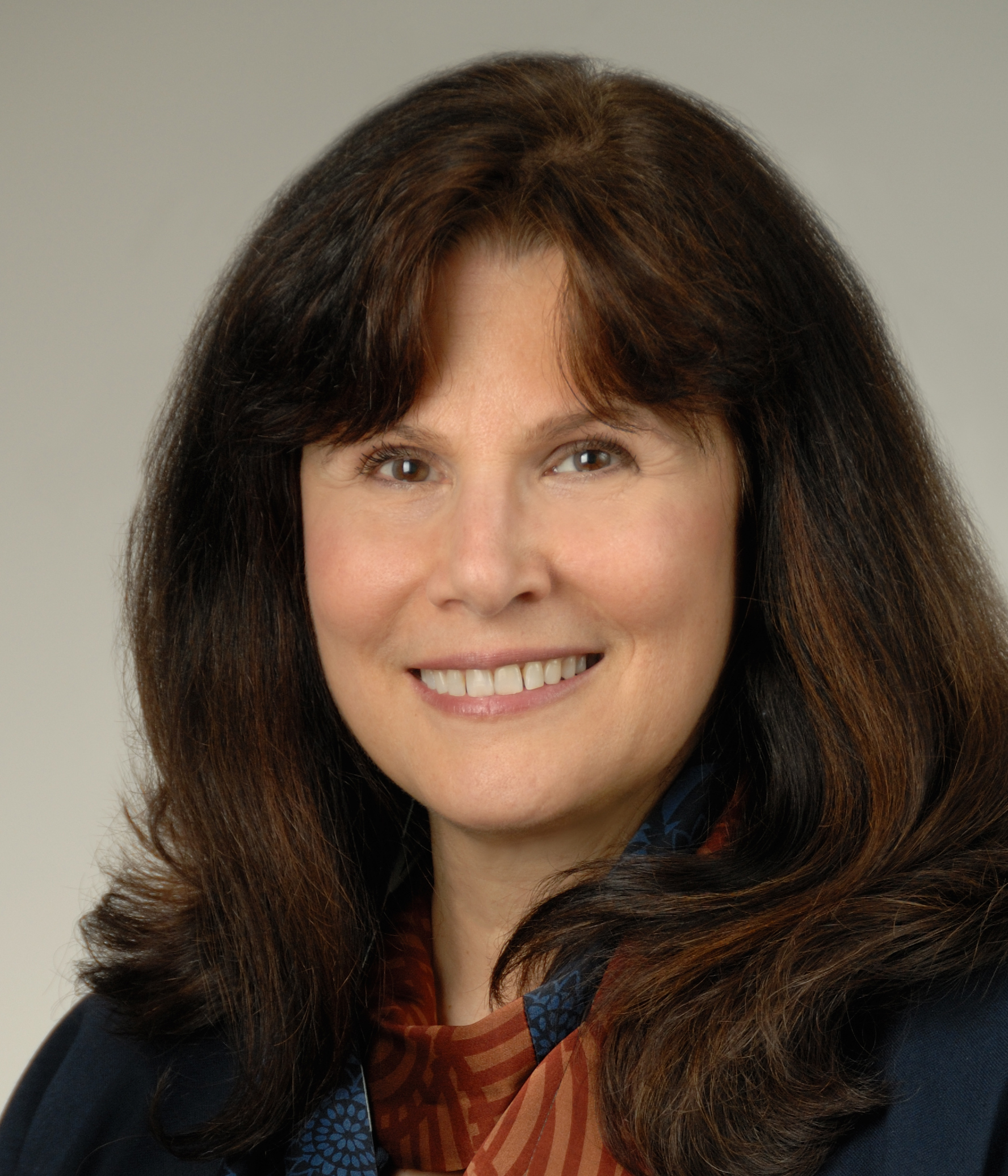
- Education: Stanford University (B.S.); University of California, San Diego (Ph.D.)
- Scientific career
- Fields: Neuroscience, neuropharmacology

Susan G. Amara is an American professor of neuroscience and is the scientific director of the National Institute of Mental Health. Amara is an elected member of the National Academy of Sciences and a fellow of the American Association for the Advancement of Science. She is a past-president of the Society for Neuroscience. Amara has a B.S. in biological sciences from Stanford University and a Ph.D. in physiology and pharmacology from the University of California, San Diego.

== Career ==
Amara was a faculty at Yale University and the Vollum Institute as an HHMI Investigator. She was elected as a member of the National Academy of Sciences in 2004, and became a fellow of the AAAS in 2007.

From 2003 to 2012, she served at the University of Pittsburgh School of Medicine as Thomas Detre Professor and Chair of Neurobiology, where she led the department’s neurobiology program.

Her main research interests are the parts of the brain that get activated when people take certain addictive drugs, specifically attention deficit hyperactive disorder (ADHD) medicine (Adderall and Ritalin), cocaine, and antidepressants. Amara's laboratory examined the impact of psychostimulant and antidepressant drugs on the signaling properties, physiology and regulation of two families of sodium-dependent neurotransmitter transporters, which are the biogenic amine and the excitatory amino acid carriers. Amara is an elected member of the National Academy of Sciences and a fellow member of the AAAS. From 2010 to 2011, she has served on the board of scientific counselors for the National Institute on Drug Abuse (NIDA) and for the National Institute on Alcohol Abuse and Alcoholism, as a secretary-treasurer of ASPET, and as the 2011 president of the Society for Neuroscience. She is on the editorial board of PNAS and as of 2026 became a co-editor of the Annual Review of Pharmacology and Toxicology.

In 2011, she testified before the United States Senate in support of funding for the National Institutes of Health (NIH). She argued in favor of funding by citing past successful NIH-funded projects that helped researchers find new ways to treat mental health and neurological disorders.

In January 2013, Amara joined the DIRP becoming the NIMH scientific director and continues her research in her new lab at the NIMH, the Laboratory of Molecular and Cellular Neurobiology in the Section on Molecular and Cellular Signaling. Since 1992, she is the member of NIH review and advisory panels, on study section chair on the National Advisory Council for the National Institute on Drug Abuse (NIDA), on the board of scientific counselors for NIDA, and on the board of scientific counselors for the National Institute on Alcohol Abuse and Alcoholism (NIAAA).

Amara served as president-elect of the American Association of the Advancement of Science (AAAS) beginning in 2020. Beginning in February 2021 Amara served as president of the AAAS. Beginning in February 2022 Amara obtained a chair on the board of directors of the AAAS.

== Honors and awards ==
- Burroughs Wellcome Hitchings Award in drug discovery
- The Society for Neuroscience Young Investigator Award
- The ASPET John Jacob Abel Award
- McKnight Neuroscience Investigator Award
- NIH MERIT Award from NIDA
- NARSAD Distinguished Investigator Award
- Julius Axelrod Award from the Catecholamine Society.
