= Amrita Ahluwalia =

British pharmacologist and Professor

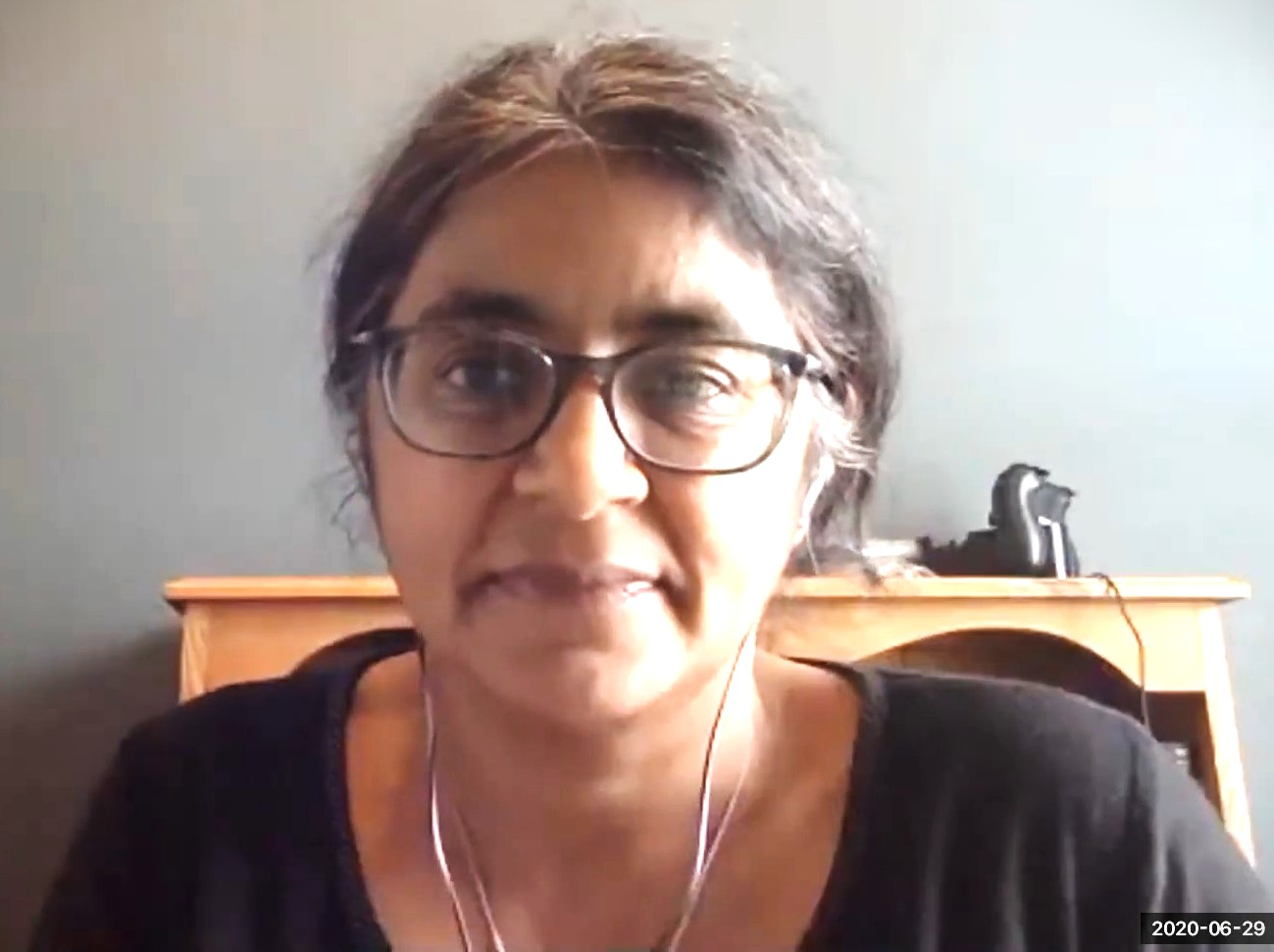
- Ahluwalia in 2020
- Education: University of Bath; Queen Mary University of London
- Scientific career
- Workplaces: University College London; Queen Mary University of London
- Thesis: Investigations into the mechanisms of topical steroid anti-inflammatory action (1993)
- Academic advisors: Patrick Vallance

Amrita Ahluwalia is a British pharmacologist and professor of vascular pharmacology at Queen Mary University of London. Her research considers the development of therapeutics for cardiovascular inflammation. She was awarded the WISE Research Award in 2015.

== Early life and education ==
Ahluwalia studied pharmacology as an undergraduate at the University of Bath. During her undergraduate degree she spent a year at Glaxo, where the systems and efficiency impressed her. Here she explored drugs that looked to improve coronary vascular function, and was first introduced to animal dissection. At Glaxo she also started using in vivo assays. She was a doctoral researcher at the Queen Mary University of London William Harvey Research Institute, where she studied the mechanisms of anti-inflammatory actions of topical steroids. After earning her doctorate she moved to St George's, University of London, where she worked with Patrick Vallance.

== Research and career ==
Ahluwalia joined the faculty at the University College London, where she was part of the Cruciform Project that would become the Wolfson Institute for Biomedical Research. She eventually returned to Queen Mary University of London, where she was made Professor of Pharmacology. Her early research focussed on the development of therapeutics for cardiovascular inflammation. She identified a new Nitric Oxide synthesis pathway, and found that beetroot could lower hypertension.

In the early 2000s she started working on an endothelial mediator that required the generation of a knockout mouse, and, to maximise efficiency, used female as well as male mice in her clinical trials. She showed that pharmaceuticals aimed at reducing blood pressure used a different biological pathway in female (as opposed to male) mice, which resulted in the release of different mediators.

Today, Ahluwalia studies how sex differences impact drug action of cardiovascular disease. The majority of FDA-approved pharmaceuticals have adverse effects in women. Her human studies have shown that women recover from inflammation quicker, which is why they are less susceptible to coronary disease.

=== Academic service ===
In 2005 she established the British Pharmacological Society women's mentoring programme, and established the Women in Pharmacology Committee in 2007. She served as Director of the William Harvey Research Institute from 2013 to 2020. She is the current Director of the UK Clinical Research Collaboration Cardiovascular Clinical Trials Unit. She served as Editor-in-Chief of the British Journal of Pharmacology from 2016 to 2022. In 2026 she became a co-editor of the Annual Review of Pharmacology and Toxicology.

== Awards and prizes ==
- 2012 GSK Prize in Clinical Pharmacology
- 2015 WISE Prize for Research
- 2023 Paget Lecture
- 2024 Fellow of the Academy of Medical Sciences

== Select publications ==
- Nathalie Percie du Sert; Viki Hurst; Amrita Ahluwalia; et al. (2020). "The ARRIVE guidelines 2.0: updated guidelines for reporting animal research". The Journal of Physiology. doi:10.1113/jp280389. PMID 32666574. Wikidata Q97533791.
- Andrew J Webb; Nakul Patel; Stavros Loukogeorgakis; et al. (2008). "Acute blood pressure lowering, vasoprotective, and antiplatelet properties of dietary nitrate via bioconversion to nitrite". Hypertension. 51 (3): 784–790. doi:10.1161/hypertensionaha.107.103523. PMC 2839282. PMID 18250365. Wikidata Q24628398.
- Curtis, Michael; Richard A Bond; Spina, Domenico; et al. (2015). "Experimental design and analysis and their reporting: new guidance for publication in BJP". British Journal of Pharmacology. 172 (14): 3461–3471. doi:10.1111/bph.12856. PMC 4507152. PMID 26114403. Wikidata Q42356330.
