= Muscarinic toxin 1 =

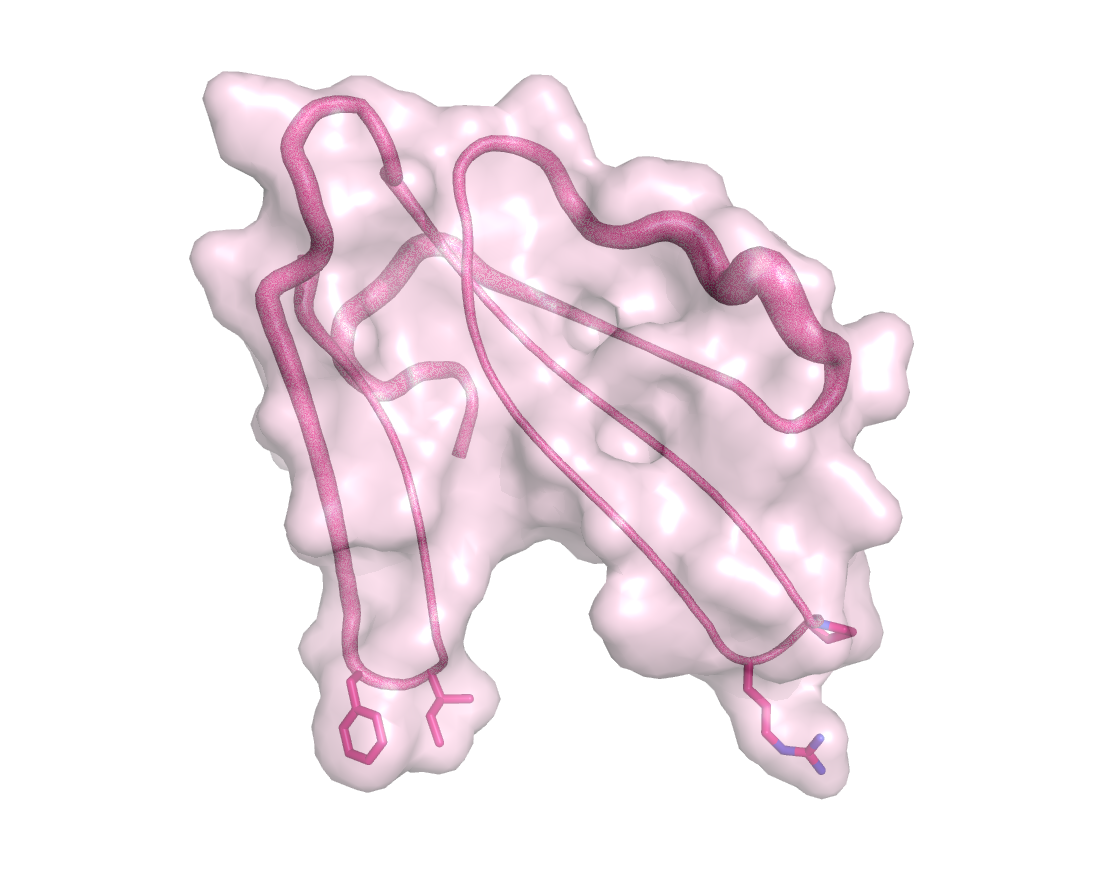
- Crystal structure of the muscarinic toxin MT1(MT1) from PDB 4DO8

Identifiers
- Symbol: MT1
- SCOP2: 1F94 / SCOPe / SUPFAM

Muscarinic toxin 1 (MT1) belongs to the family of small peptides of 65 amino acid residues derived from the venom of African mamba snakes (Dendroaspis angusticeps), with dual specificity for muscarinic receptor subtypes M1 (Ki=20–35 nM) and M4 (Ki=30–72 nM). Muscarinic toxins like the nicotinic toxins have the three-finger fold structure, characteristic of the large superfamily of toxins that act at cholinergic synapses.
