= Ronald Okun =

American physician and pharmacologist

- Born: August 7, 1932 (age 92); California, United States
- Education: University of California, Los Angeles; University of California, San Francisco
- Partner: Katherine G. Okun
- Children: 3
- Scientific career
- Institutions: Johns Hopkins University; Cedars-Sinai Medical Center; University of California, Los Angeles; University of California, Irvine

Ronald Okun (born August 7, 1932) is an American physician and pharmacologist. He testified before the United States Congress three times on behalf of tobacco industry in the 1960s and 1970s, attempting to discredit the fact that smoking causes illness. He was also the co-editor of the Annual Review of Pharmacology and Toxicology from 1977–1989. For at least twenty years, he was the director of clinical pharmacology at Cedars-Sinai Medical Center.

== Early life and education ==
Ronald Okun was born in California on August 7, 1932 to parents Sol and Bertha Okun, Jewish emigrants from Russia. He had an older sister, Anna, and brother, Seymour. He attended the University of California, Los Angeles (UCLA) for his bachelor's degree, graduating in 1954. He then attended the University of California, San Francisco for a master's degree in pharmacology and toxicology and Doctor of Medicine; he received both degrees in 1958.

== Career ==
Following the completion of his MD, Okun completed an internship and residency at a veterans' hospital in Los Angeles. This was followed by a research fellowship at Johns Hopkins University from 1961–1963. In 1963 he was appointed the director of clinical pharmacology at Cedars-Sinai Medical Center as well as an assistant professor of medicine and pharmacology at UCLA. From 1964–1971 he was a research pharmacologist at a veterans' hospital in North Hills, Los Angeles; from 1969–1971 he was a pharmacological consultant for the California Department of Public Health. In 1970 he began teaching as an associate professor of medicine, medical pharmacology, and therapeutics at the University of California, Irvine.

Okun testified before Congress on behalf of the tobacco industry in 1969, 1972, and 1976 saying, in part, that he could not find "persuasive evidence that cigarette smoking causes lung cancer". From 1973–1976, Okun was one of four physicians in California responsible for nearly all pharmaceutical testing on prisoners in the state, along with J. Alfred Rider, William L. Epstein, and Howard Maibach.

He remained the head of Cedars-Sinai pharmacology department and a professor at UCLA until at least 1984. Along with Robert George, he was the co-editor of the Annual Review of Pharmacology and Toxicology from 1977–1989.

=== Selected publications ===
Some of Okun's most-cited publications include:

- Schoenfield, Leslie J.; Lachin, John M.; Baum, Richard A.; Habig, Robert L.; Hanson, Russell F.; Hersh, Theodore; Hightower Jr., N. C.; Hofmann, Alan F.; Lasser, Elliot C.; Marks, Jay W.; Mekhjian, Hagop; Okun, Ronald; Schaefer, Robert A.; Shaw, Lawrence; Soloway, Roger D.; Thistle, Johnson L.; Thomas, Fred B.; Tyor, Malcolm P. (1981). "Chenodiol (Chenodeoxycholic Acid) for Dissolution of Gallstones: The National Cooperative Gallstone Study". Annals of Internal Medicine. 95 (3): 257–82. doi:10.7326/0003-4819-95-3-257. PMID 7023307.
- Lubitz, Joseph A.; Freeman, L.; Okun, R. (1973). "Mitotane Use in Inoperable Adrenal Cortical Carcinoma". JAMA: The Journal of the American Medical Association. 223 (10): 1109–12. doi:10.1001/jama.1973.03220100011003. PMID 4739370.
- Okun, Ronald; Liddon, Sim C.; Lasagna, Louis (1963-01-01). "The Effects of Aggregation, Electric Shock, and Adrenergic Blocking Drugs on Inhibition of the "Writhing Syndrome"". Journal of Pharmacology and Experimental Therapeutics. 139 (1): 107–109. ISSN 0022-3565. PMID 13939888.

== Awards and honors ==
In 1973, he was the president of the American Academy of Clinical Toxicology; he was elected as a fellow to the society in 1976. He was also made a fellow of the American College of Physicians in 1972.

== Personal life ==
He was married to Katherine G. Okun, with whom he had three children.
