= Vagal escape =

Medical term

The sympathetic nervous system and parasympathetic nervous system can offset each other. One of the most classical example is called vagal escape. Vagal escape is characterized by a reduction in blood pressure due to muscarinic stimulation which is then compensated for stimulation from the sympathetic system to increase heart rate and thus blood pressure. When the heart is continuously stimulated via the vagus nerve, initially there is stoppage of heart beat. With further continuous stimuli, heart beat resumes (namely the ventricles) as the parasympathetic nerves only have their influence on the SA and AV nodes of the heart and not on the musculature of the heart, which establishes its own rhythm.
