= Guide to Pharmacology =

Pharmacology database

IUPHAR/BPS Guide to PHARMACOLOGY

Content
- Description: An online, open-access portal to pharmacological information on all the human targets of prescription drugs
- Data types captured: Target nomenclature, pharmacological data, ligand structures
- Organisms: Human, Mouse, Rat

Contact
- Research centre: University of Edinburgh, UK
- Primary citation: The IUPHAR/BPS Guide to PHARMACOLOGY in 2020: extending immunopharmacology content and introducing the IUPHAR/MMV Guide to MALARIA PHARMACOLOGY

Access
- Website: www.guidetopharmacology.org
- Web service URL: www.guidetopharmacology.org/webServices.jsp
- Sparql endpoint: rdf.guidetopharmacology.org/sparql

Miscellaneous
- Versioning: Content updated approx quarterly (i.e. 2020.2 indicates [year].[release number])
- Curation policy: Manual, in-house

The IUPHAR/BPS Guide to PHARMACOLOGY is an open-access website, acting as a portal to information on the biological targets of licensed drugs and other small molecules. The Guide to PHARMACOLOGY (with GtoPdb being the standard abbreviation) is developed as a joint venture between the International Union of Basic and Clinical Pharmacology (IUPHAR) and the British Pharmacological Society (BPS). This replaces and expands upon the original 2009 IUPHAR Database (standard abbreviation IUPHAR-DB). The Guide to PHARMACOLOGY aims to provide a concise overview of all pharmacological targets, accessible to all members of the scientific and clinical communities and the interested public, with links to details on a selected set of targets. The information featured includes pharmacological data, target, and gene nomenclature, as well as curated chemical information for ligands. Overviews and commentaries on each target family are included, with links to key references.

== Background and development ==
The Guide to PHARMACOLOGY was initially made available online in December 2011 with additional material released in July 2012. Maintained by a team of curators based at the University of Edinburgh, the Guide to PHARMACOLOGY is developed by an international network of contributors, including the editors of the Concise Guide to PHARMACOLOGY. As with the original IUPHAR-DB, the International Union of Basic and Clinical Pharmacology (IUPHAR) Committee on Receptor Nomenclature and Drug Classification (NC-IUPHAR), acts as the scientific advisory and editorial board for the database. Its network of over 500 specialist advisors (organized into ~90 subcommittees) contribute expertise and data. The current PI and Grant holder of the GtoPdb project is Prof. Jamie A. Davies. The development and release of the first version of the GtoPdb in 2012 were described in an editorial published in the British Journal of Pharmacology entitled 'Guide to Pharmacology.org- an update'. The IUPHAR-DB is no longer being developed and all the information contained within this site is now available through the Guide to PHARMACOLOGY (IUPHAR-DB links should now re-direct).

== Content and features ==
The target groups currently included on the Guide to PHARMACOLOGY are:

- Catalytic receptors
- Enzymes
- G protein-coupled receptors
- Ion channels
- Kinases
- Nuclear receptors
- Transporters
- Other protein targets including fatty acid-binding proteins, sigma receptors and adiponectin receptors

Information for each target group is subdivided into families based on classification, with a separate data page for each family. Within each page, targets are arranged into lists of tables, with each table including the protein and gene nomenclature for the target with links to gene nomenclature databases, and listing selected ligands with activity at the target, including agonists, antagonists, inhibitors and radioligands. Pharmacological data and references are given and each ligand is hyperlinked to a ligand page displaying nomenclature and a chemical structure or peptide sequence, along with synonyms and relevant database links. The Guide to PHARMACOLOGY also includes a list of all ligand molecules included on the site, subdivided into categories including small organic molecules (including mammalian metabolites, hormones and neurotransmitters), synthetic organic molecules, natural products, peptides, inorganic molecules and antibodies. A complete list of all the approved drugs included on the website is also available via the ligand list. The Guide to PHARMACOLOGY is being expanded to include clinical information on targets and ligands, in addition to educational resources. Search features on the website include quick and advanced search options, and receptor and ligand searches, including support for ligand structures using chemical structures. Other features include 'Hot topic' news items and a recent receptor-ligand pairing list.

== IUPHAR Guide to IMMUNOPHARMACOLOGY ==
Between November 2015 and October 2018, the Wellcome Trust supported a project to develop the IUPHAR Guide to IMMUNOPHARMACOLOGY (GtoImmuPdb), based on the GtoPdb schema. The GtoImmuPdb is an open-access resource that brings an immunological perspective to the high-quality, expert-curated pharmacological data found in the existing IUPHAR/BPS Guide to PHARMACOLOGY. Protein targets and ligands relevant to immunopharmacology have been tagged and curated into GtoImmuPdb. These have also been associated with new immunological data types such as immunological processes, cell types, and disease. GtoImmuPdb provides a knowledge base that connects immunology with pharmacology, bringing added value and supporting research and development of drugs targeted at modulating immune, inflammatory or infectious components of the disease.

== The Concise Guide to PHARMACOLOGY ==
The Guide to PHARMACOLOGY includes an online, open-access database version of the Concise Guide to PHARMACOLOGY, previously "The Guide to Receptors and Channels" available in HTML, PDF and printed formats. A hard copy summary of the online database is published as The Concise Guide to Pharmacology 2017/2018 as a series of papers as a bi-annual supplement to the British Journal of Pharmacology.

== Database links ==
The Guide to PHARMACOLOGY includes links to other relevant resources via target and ligand pages on both the concise and detailed view pages. Many of these resources maintain reciprocal links with the relevant Guide to PHARMACOLOGY pages.

- HUGO Gene Nomenclature Committee
- Mouse Genome Informatics
- Rat genome database
- Ensembl
- UniProt
- Entrez
- PubChem
- ChemSpider
- ChEMBL
- ChEBI
- KEGG
- Online Mendelian Inheritance in Man (OMIM)
- DrugBank
- Protein Data Bank

== Future directions ==
Following funding from the Wellcome Trust, from 2012 to 2015 the Guide to PHARMACOLOGY was expanded to include the biological targets of all prescription drugs and other likely targets of future small molecule drugs. Overviews of the key features of a wide range of targets are provided on the summary view pages, with detailed view pages providing more in-depth information on the properties of a selected subset of targets. As of January 2018 the Medicines for Malaria Venture is supporting a new extension to develop the Guide to Malaria Pharmacology. The core GtoPdb continues to be supported by the British Pharmacological Society.

== See also ==
- International Union of Basic and Clinical Pharmacology
- British Pharmacological Society
- Biological target
- British Journal of Pharmacology
