= Muscarinic toxin 7 =

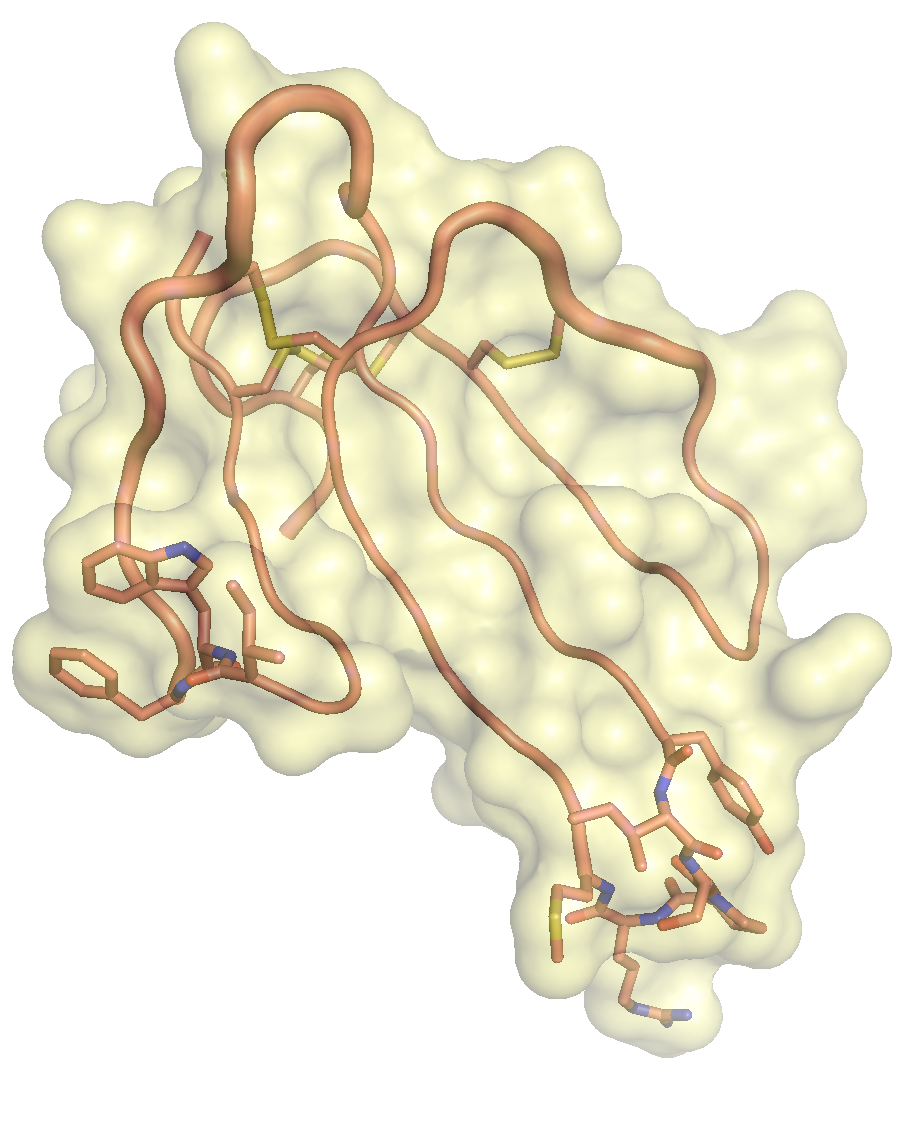
- Crystal structure of Muscarinic toxin 7 (MT7) from PDB 2VLW

Identifiers
- Symbol: MT7
- SCOP2: 1F94 / SCOPe / SUPFAM

Muscarinic toxin 7 (MT7) is one member of a family of small peptides of 65 amino acid residues derived from the venom of African mamba snakes (Dendroaspis angusticeps), which mainly target M1-subtype of muscarinic receptor. Muscarinic toxins like the nicotinic toxins have the three-finger fold structure, characteristic of the large superfamily of toxins that act at cholinergic synapses.

MT7 is likely to bind to the human M1 receptor in its dimer form with the tips of MT7 loops II and III contacting one hM1 protomer and the tip of loop I binds to the other protomer.

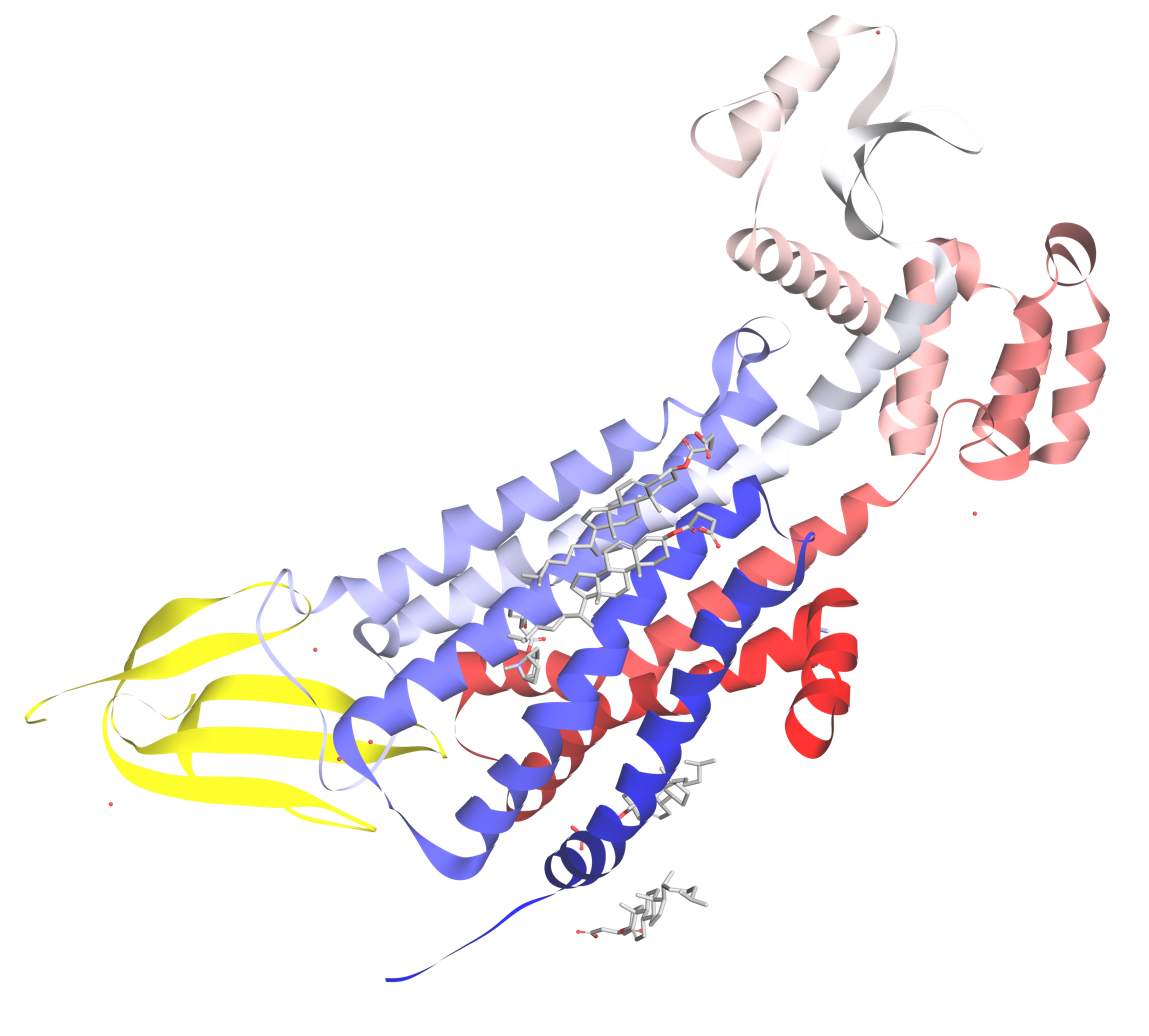
PDB ID 60IJ rendered with BIOVA Discovery Visual Studio. Muscarinic Toxin 7 (yellow ribbon) bound to the Muscarinic M1 receptor (Red -> Blue indicates N -> C terminus)
