= Thomas R. Insel =

American neuroscientist (born 1951)

Thomas Roland Insel
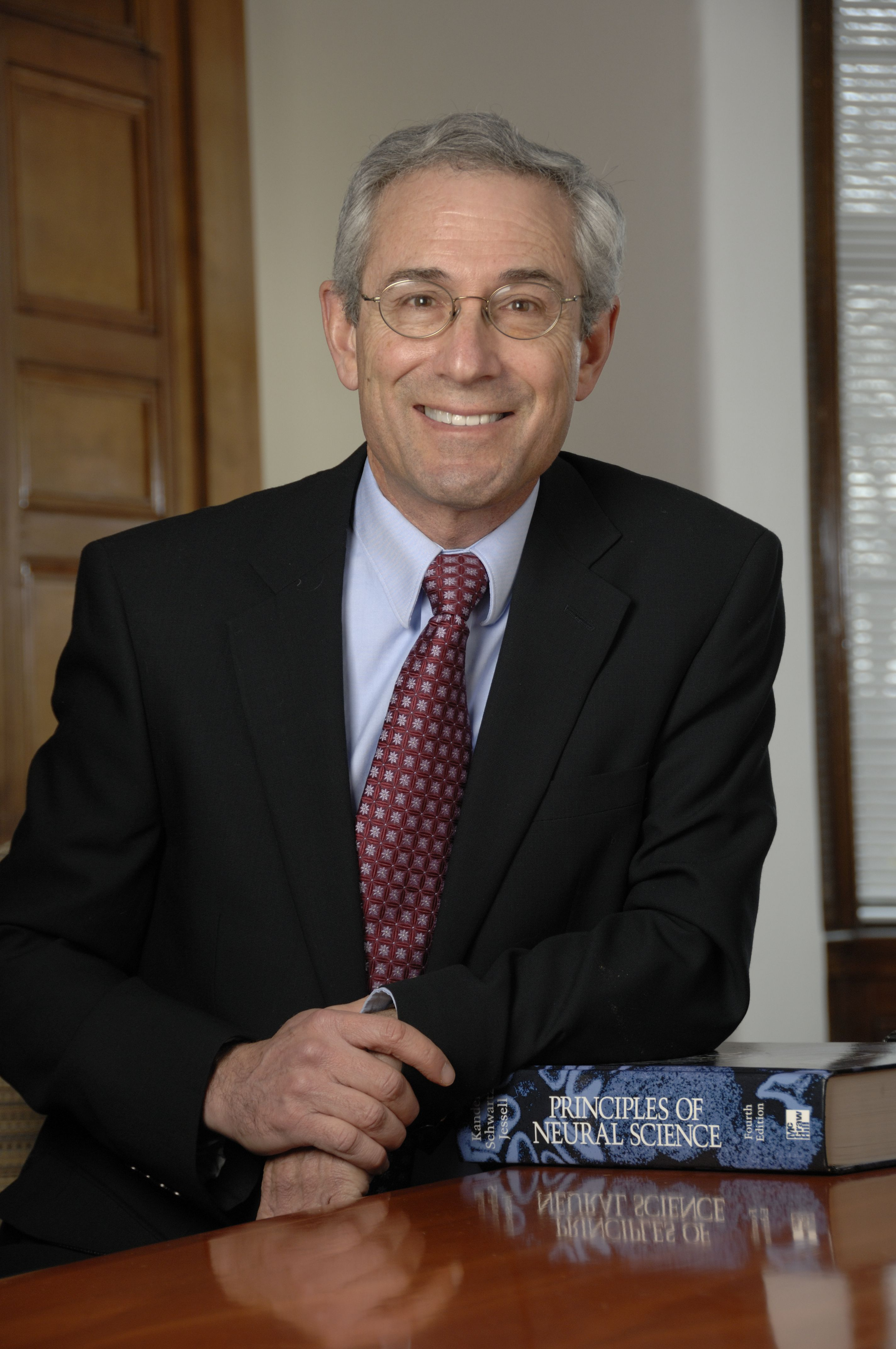
- Born: October 19, 1951 (age 75); Dayton, Ohio, United States
- Education: Boston University (B.A.); Boston University (M.D.)
- Known for: Research on oxytocin and vasopressin and their impact on social behavior
- Scientific career
- Workplaces: National Institute of Mental Health; Emory University

Notes
- Paul A. Insel (brother)

Thomas Roland Insel (born October 19, 1951) is an American neuroscientist, psychiatrist, entrepreneur, and author who led the National Institute of Mental Health (NIMH) from 2002 until November 2015. Prior to becoming Director of NIMH, he was the founding Director of the Center for Behavioral Neuroscience at Emory University in Atlanta, Georgia. He is best known for research on oxytocin and vasopressin, two peptide hormones implicated in complex social behaviors, such as parental care and attachment. He announced on Sept. 15, 2015, that he was resigning as the director of the NIMH to join the Life Science division of Google X (now Verily Life Sciences). On May 8, 2017, CNBC reported that he had left Verily Life Sciences. Insel is a Co-founder with Richard Klausner and Paul Dagum of a digital mental health company named "Mindstrong," a Bay-area startup. He has also co-founded Humanest Care, NeuraWell Therapeutics, and MindSite News and is a member of the scientific advisory board for Compass Pathways, a company that is developing the psychedelic drug psilocybin to treat depression and other mental health disorders. His book, Healing: Our Path from Mental Illness to Mental Health was published by Penguin Random House in February, 2022.

== Early years ==
Born in Dayton, Ohio, Insel was the youngest of four sons. His father, H. Herbert Insel, was an ophthalmologist who moved the family from Ohio to Silver Spring, Maryland in 1960. There, the precocious Insel earned his Eagle Scout badge just after turning 13, began college courses at age 14 and left high school to enroll in the Boston University Combined Pre-Medical Program, where he focused on English literature, at age 15. By age 17, having completed most of the requirements for his pre-medical degree and still below draft age, Insel began exploring the world. He hitch-hiked across Canada and through the West, married Deborah Silber soon after his 18th birthday, then traveled with her around the world, stopping to work at a TB clinic in Hong Kong and a mission hospital in Bihar, India.

From 1970-1974 Insel attended Boston University Medical School with plans to return to Asia working in tropical medicine. These plans changed with exposure to two prominent Boston neuroscientists: Walle Nauta at MIT and Norman Geschwind at Harvard Medical School. Following medical school, he trained in psychiatry at University California San Francisco (1976-1979) including in Jungian psychoanalysis and a first exposure to research with Irwin Feinberg.{Fein G, Feinberg I, Insel TR, Antrobus JS, Price LJ, Floyd TC, Nelson MA. Sleep mentation in the elderly. Psychophysiology. 1985 Mar;22(2):218-25. doi: 10.1111/j.1469-8986.1985.tb01590.x. PMID: 3991849.}

== Research career ==
Following clinical training, Insel joined the NIMH as a clinical fellow working with Dennis Murphy. In 1980 he began the first U.S. research project on the biology of adults with obsessive compulsive disorder (OCD), which was then largely treated with psychoanalysis. Following initial reports from Sweden, Insel was the first to demonstrate scientifically that a tricyclic antidepressant, clomipramine, was effective for treating OCD. This observation not only launched the neuropharmacological study of OCD, it suggested the importance of developing the SSRI class of antidepressants, which became a mainstay for treating both depression and OCD in the 1990s. {Zohar J, Insel TR, Zohar-Kadouch RC, Hill JL, Murphy DL. Serotonergic responsivity in obsessive-compulsive disorder. Effects of chronic clomipramine treatment. Arch Gen Psychiatry. 1988 Feb;45(2):167-72. doi: 10.1001/archpsyc.1988.01800260081011. PMID: 3276283.}

Following this foray into clinical research, Insel moved from the clinic into the laboratory to study the neurobiology of emotion. Beginning in the NIMH Laboratory of Brain Evolution and Behavior started by Paul Maclean in Poolesville, MD, his group developed some of the classic studies for investigating social behavior in animals, from ultrasonic vocalizations in rodent pups to social attachment in prairie voles to paternal care in marmosets. A major focus was oxytocin, known to support lactation and parturition, but shown in rats to be important for the initiation of maternal care by actions on brain receptors. Oxytocin and the related hormone vasopressin were also found to be critical for pair bonding in adult prairie voles. The Insel lab found that monogamous voles and non-monogamous voles (that did not pair bond) had brain receptors for oxytocin and vasopressin in different brain circuits, suggesting a mechanism for the evolution of monogamy in mammals.

In 1994 Insel was recruited to Emory University to direct the Yerkes Regional Primate Research Center, the nation's oldest and internationally one of the largest centers for research on monkeys and great apes. His tenure at Yerkes was marked by a focus on neurobiology and infectious disease, with a specific emphasis on development of an AIDS vaccine. This was also a period of considerable animal rights protests against Yerkes, with Insel and his family targeted by protesters opposed to invasive research with non-human primates.

In 1999 Insel resigned from Yerkes to lead a new $40 million National Science Foundation Science and Technology Center, the Center for Behavioral Neuroscience. This new program used behavioral neuroscience to develop a cross-institutional training and research effort for 7 colleges and universities in Atlanta, with a specific goal of increasing the number of African American undergraduate students participating in neuroscience research.{https://cbn-atl.org/} This period was also a productive phase for social neuroscience research carried out at Emory. Larry Young, Zuoxin Wang, and Jim Winslow and several outstanding graduate students focused on the molecular biology, anatomy, and behavioral properties of oxytocin and vasopressin, providing critical evidence for the role of these neuropeptide systems in complex social behaviors. In his final years at Emory, Insel led the team into studies of autism, starting a new NIH funded Autism Center to investigate oxytocin and vasopressin as potential treatments for this disorder of social behavior.{Insel TR, Fernald RD. How the brain processes social information: searching for the social brain. Annu Rev Neurosci. 2004;27:697-722. doi: 10.1146/annurev.neuro.27.070203.144148. PMID: 15217348.}

== NIMH director ==
Insel's return to become the ninth director of NIMH in 2002 was unexpected, as he had little connection to medical and pharmaceutical psychiatry since his OCD research which ended almost twenty years before. At NIMH, he quickly focused on serious mental illnesses, such as schizophrenia, bipolar illness, and major depressive disorder with a defining theme of these illnesses as disorders of brain circuits. Building on the genomics revolution, he created large repositories of DNA and funded many of the first large genotyping and sequencing efforts to identify risk genes. He established autism as a major area of focus for NIMH and led a large increase of NIH funding for autism research. Under his leadership, autism, as a developmental brain disorder, became a prototype for mental disorders, most of which also emerge during development. And during his tenure, NIMH became a leader in global mental health, working closely with the World Health Organization and the Global Alliance for Chronic Disease. In addition, he helped launch a new framework for classifying mental illnesses called the Research Domain Criteria.

== Private sector ==
In December, 2015, Dr. Insel joined Verily, a health technology start-up emerging from Google X. At Verily, he founded and led the mental health team with a focus on digital phenotyping, using smartphone signals for measuring behavior and mood. In May 2017, Dr. Insel moved to Mindstrong, based in Palo Alto, California, as the startup's President and Co-Founder. Mindstrong created measurement-based care solutions, especially for people with serious mental illness. In 2019, he took a leave of absence from Mindstrong to assist newly elected California Governor Gavin Newsom on a reorganization of the state's behavioral healthcare system. Newsom named Dr. Insel as his "behavioral health czar" although he served only as a volunteer in this role. He simultaneously served as Chair of the Board for the Steinberg Institute, a behavioral health policy shop in Sacramento, California. In early 2020, Dr. Insel returned to the private sector with a new mental health start-up, NEST Health renamed Humanest Care, co-founded with his daughter, Lara Gregorio. His book, Healing: Our Path from Mental Illness to Mental Health, about transforming behavioral health was published by Penguin Random House in February, 2022. Following publication of Healing, Dr. Insel co-founded (with Giovanni Colella) Vanna Health, a company dedicated to optimizing recovery for people with serious mental illness. In 2025, with Dr. David Mou he co-founded Benchmark Health to focus on quality standards for digital mental health. In addition to being the Executive Chair of Vanna Health, he currently serves on the boards of Fountain House and the Peterson Health Technology Institute as well as serving as an advisor for several innovative mental health companies (Alto Neuroscience, Salma Health, Ellipsis Health, Slingshot).

== Recognition ==
Insel is a member of the National Academy of Medicine, National Academy of Sciences.[6] He has received the A.E. Bennett Award (1986), the Curt Richter Prize (1991), the Outstanding Service Award from the US Public Health Service (1993), the W. Alden Spencer Award from Columbia University (2004) the Sachar Prize (2007), the Outstanding Alumnus Award from Boston University (2009), the NAMI Outstanding Service Award (2009), the IPSEN Prize (2010), the Shorr Family Prize from the University of Arizona (2011), the Dr. Nathan Davis Award for Government Service from the American Medical Association (2013), the Jed Foundation Voice of Mental Health Award (2013), the American Psychiatric Nurses Association 2013 Scientific Partnership Award, the Brain & Behavior Research Foundation ‘Productive Lives’ Award (2014), the Child Mind Institute Distinguished Scientist Award (2014), and the Autism Science Foundation Distinguished Scientist Award (2015). Insel has received honorary degrees from the University of Edinburgh (2014), the Feinstein Institutes for Medical Research (2016), University of Basel (2018), Boston University (2020). His work has been cited with features in the New York Times and The Atlantic and Wall Street Journal

== Publications ==
In addition to over 200 published scientific articles or chapters, books by Insel include:

- Numan, MM and Insel, T.R.: The Neurobiology of Maternal Behavior (Springer Verlag, 2011 in press)
- Pedersen C.A., Caldwell, J.D., Jirikowski, G., and Insel, T.R.(eds.): Oxytocin in Maternal, Sexual and Social Behaviors (New York Academy of Sciences Press, 1992)
- Zohar, J., Rasmussen, S., and Insel, T. R. (eds.): The Psychobiology of Obsessive-Compulsive Disorder (Springer-Verlag, 1991)
- Insel, T.R. (ed.): New Findings in Obsessive-Compulsive Disorder (American Psychiatric Press, Inc., 1984)
- Insel, Thomas: Healing: Our Path from Mental Illness to Mental Health (Penguin Random House, 2022)
