= Henry Wood Elliott =

American painter

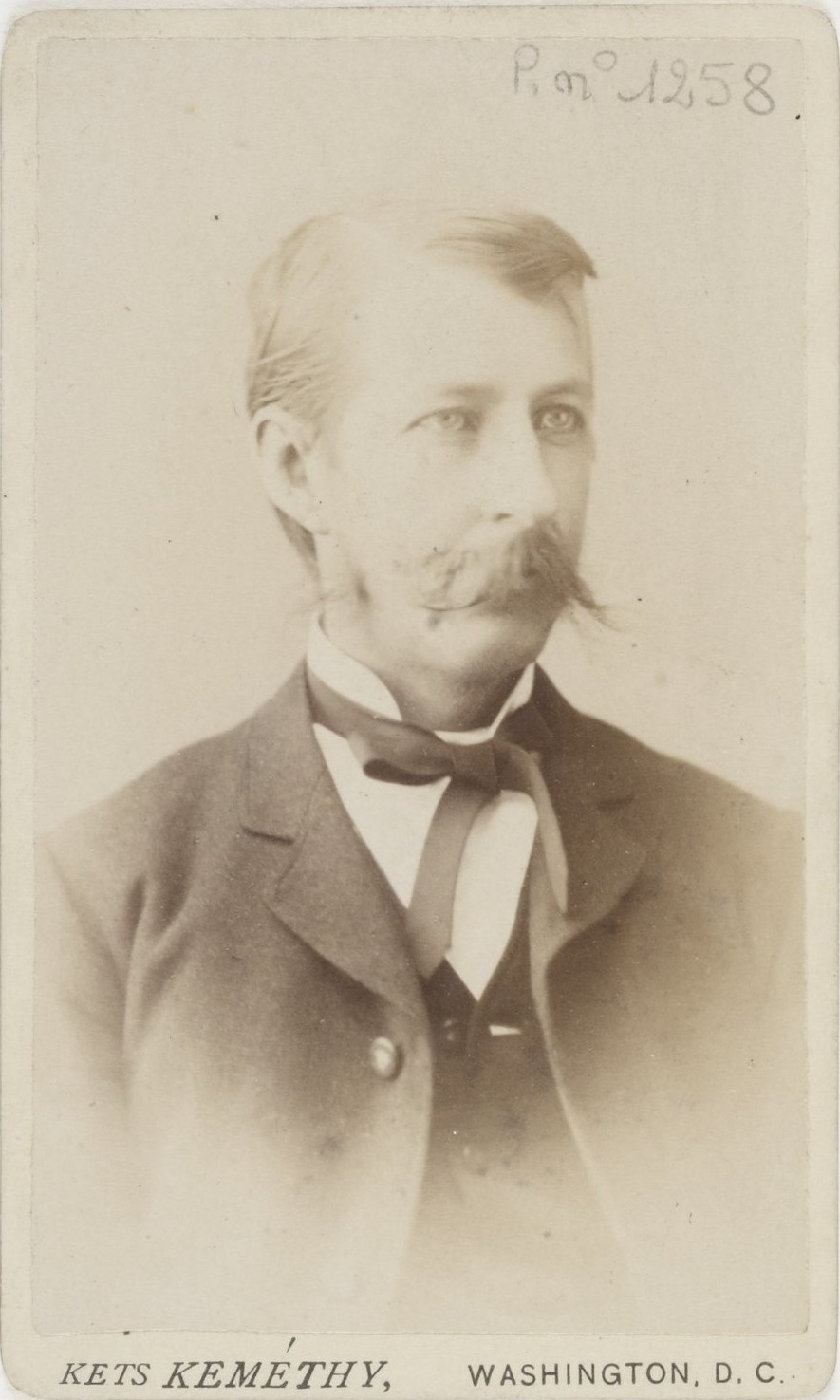
- Born: November 13, 1846; Cleveland
- Died: May 25, 1930 (aged 83)
- Occupation: Artist; environmentalist; naturalist; watercolorist

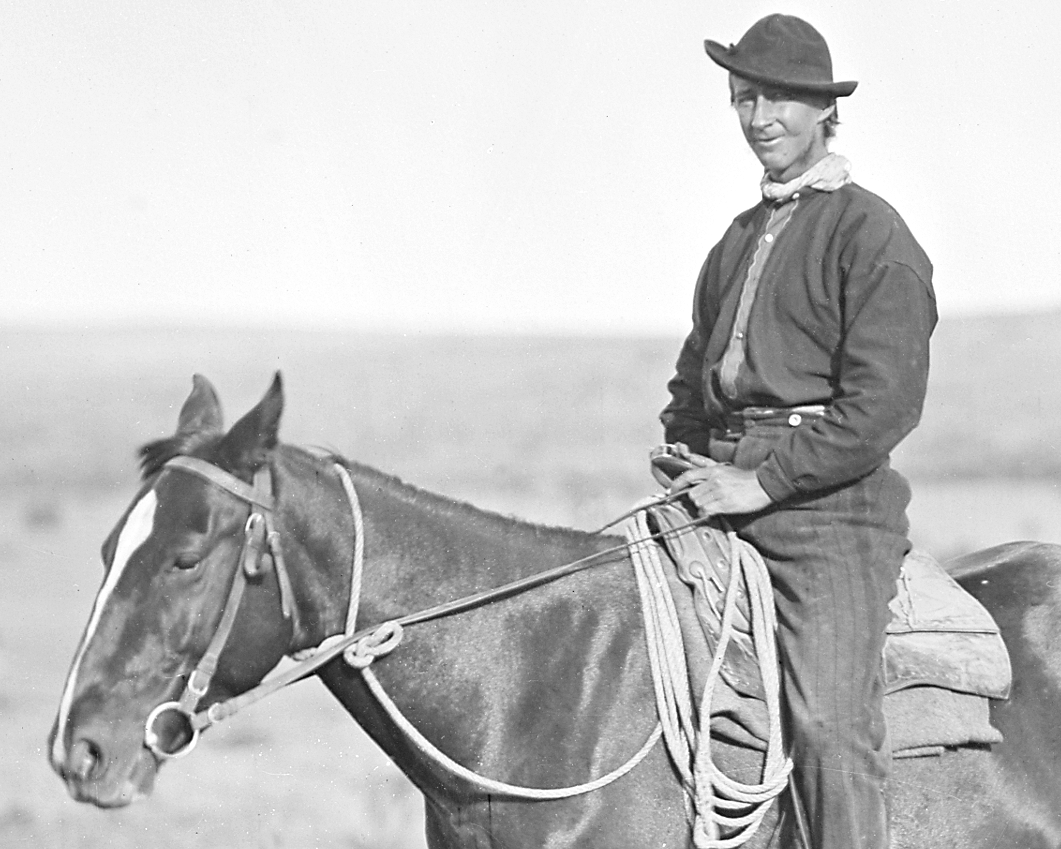
Henry Wood Elliott, as a member of the 1871 Hayden U.S. Geological Survey expedition to Yellowstone.

Henry Wood Elliott (November 13, 1846 – May 25, 1930) was an American watercolor painter, author, and environmentalist whose work primarily focused on Alaskan subjects. He was the author of the 1911 Hay-Elliott Fur Seal Treaty, the first international treaty on wildlife conservation.

A number of his works have an ethnographic bent, displaying aboriginal Alaskans engaging in traditional practices; some of these works are stored in the National Anthropological Archives at the Smithsonian. Elliott also focused on the Alaskan landscape and wildlife.

In 1886, Elliott published a book entitled Our Arctic Province: Alaska and the Seal Islands, which contains an in-depth exploration of Alaska's history, geography, people, and wildlife.

He became involved in early conservation efforts of the fur seal, in 1905 co-authoring a document with United States Secretary of State John Hay that would eventually become the North Pacific Fur Seal Convention of 1911, the first international treaty dedicated to the conservation of wildlife.

== Gallery ==
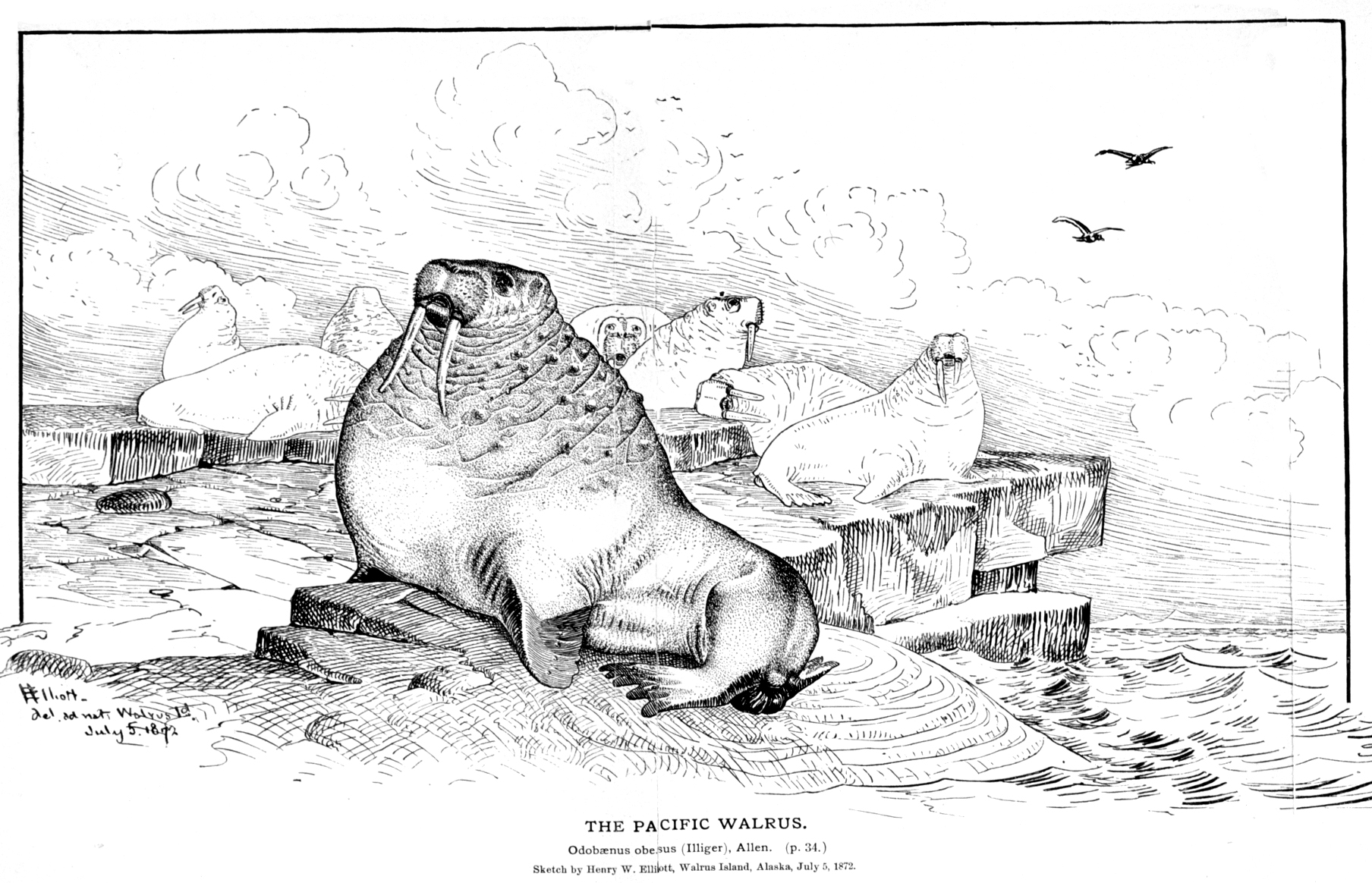
Pacific walrus, July 5, 1872

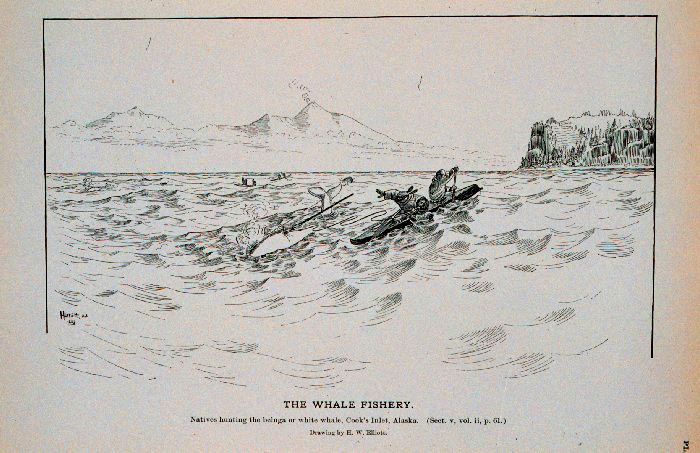
Hunting a Beluga whale

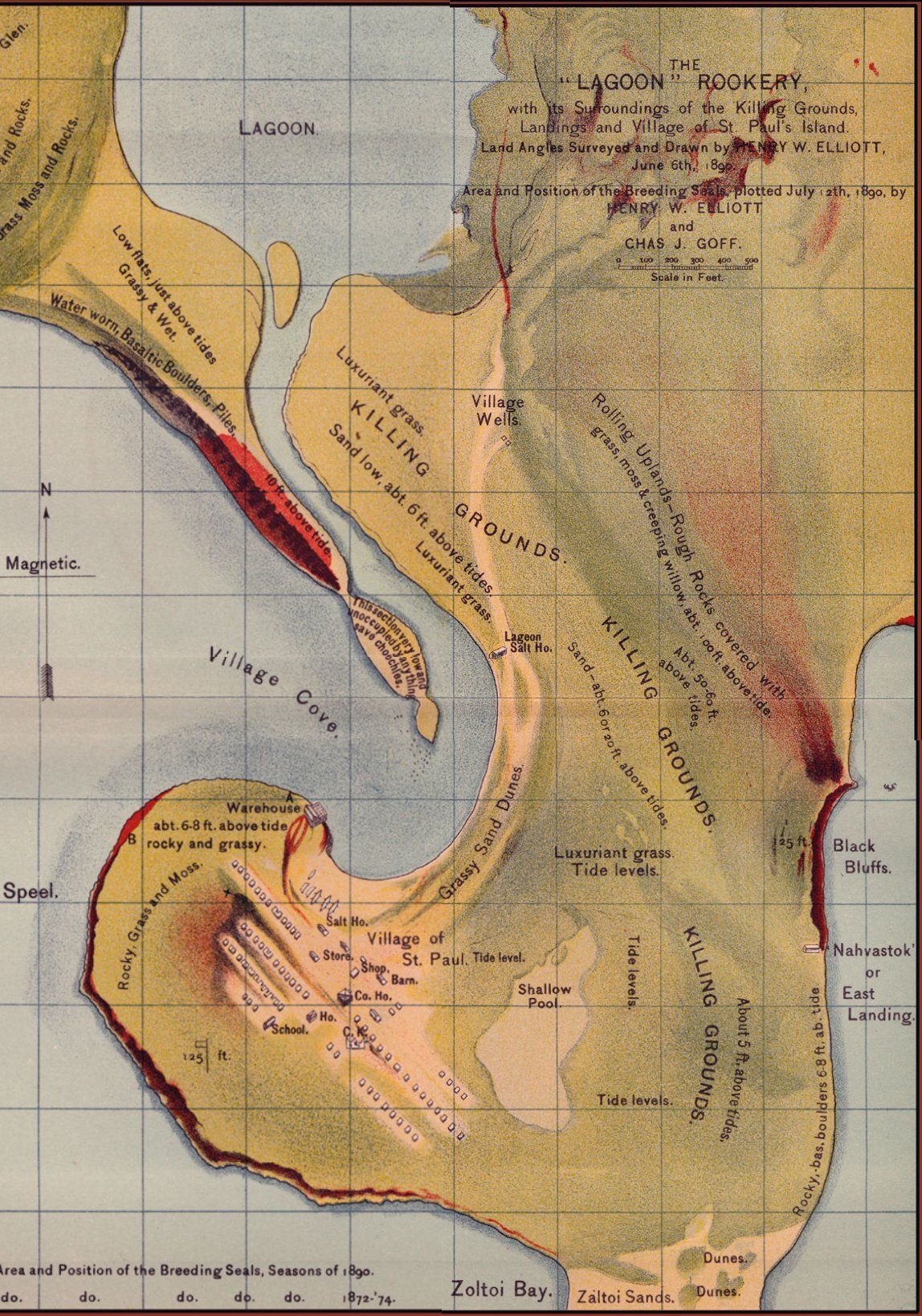
Map of St. Paul Island drawn by Elliott in 1890

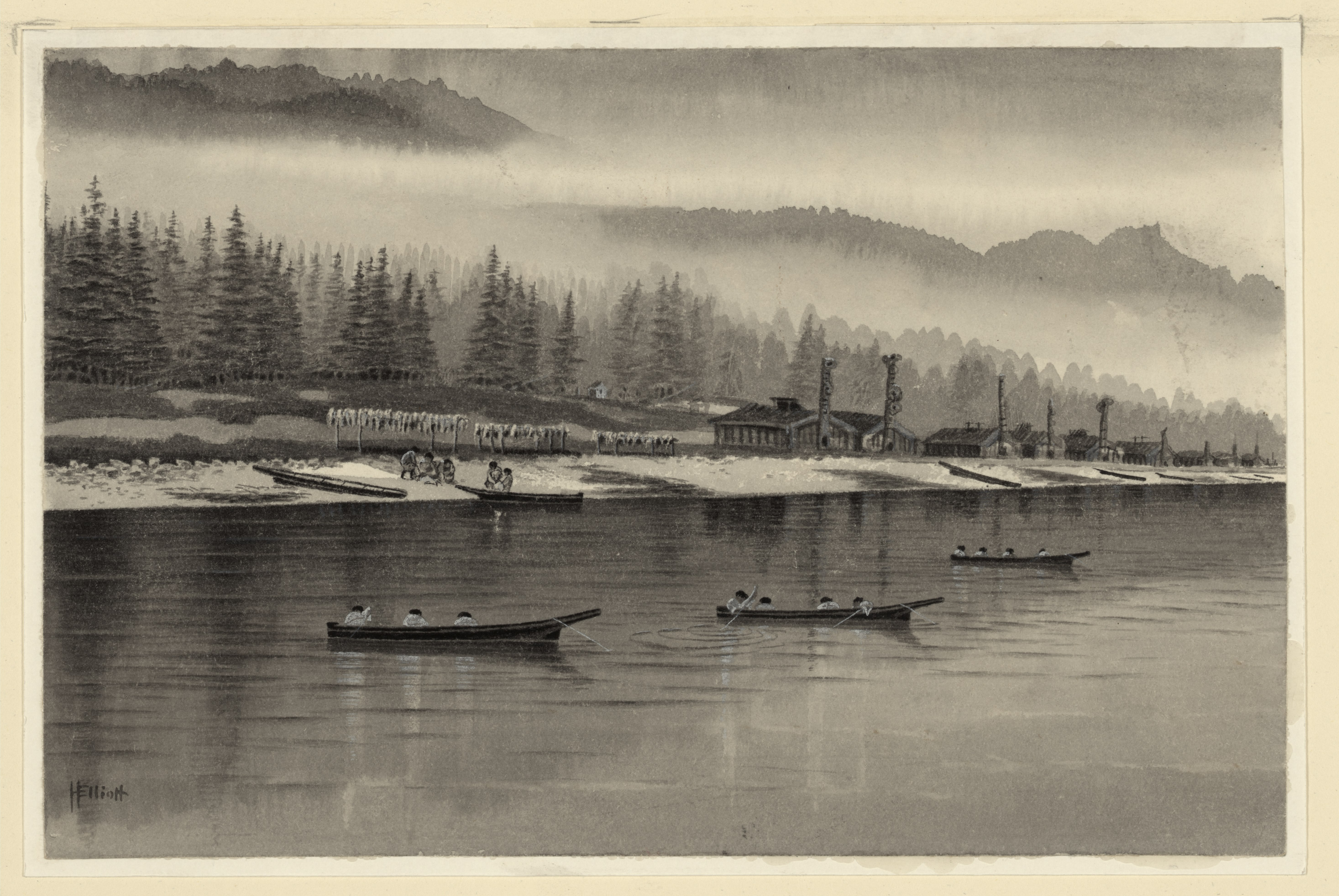
Fishing in Alaska, a 1874 drawing by Elliott
