= British Journal of Pharmacology =

English academic journal

- Discipline: Pharmacology
- Language: English
- Edited by: Péter Ferdinandy

Publication details
- Former names: British Journal of Pharmacology and Chemotherapy
- History: 1946–present
- Publisher: Wiley-Blackwell on behalf of the British Pharmacological Society (United Kingdom)
- Frequency: Bi-monthly
- Open access: Delayed (after 12 months)
- Impact factor: 7.7 (2024)

Standard abbreviations
- ISO 4: Br. J. Pharmacol.

Indexing
- CODEN: BJPCBM
- ISSN: 0007-1188 (print); 1476-5381 (web)
- LCCN: 2005204900
- OCLC no.: 01240522

Links
- Journal homepage; Online access; Online archive

The British Journal of Pharmacology is a biweekly peer-reviewed medical journal covering all aspects of experimental pharmacology. It is published for the British Pharmacological Society by Wiley-Blackwell.

The current editor-in-chief is Péter Ferdinandy. Previous editors-in-chief include Amrita Ahluwalia, Ian McGrath , Humphrey Rang, Alan North, Phil Moore, Bill Large, and Tony Birmingham. A sister journal, also published for the British Pharmacological Society by Wiley-Blackwell, is the British Journal of Clinical Pharmacology. The journal publishes research papers, review articles, commentaries and correspondence in all fields of pharmacology. It also publishes themed issues, as well as supplements.

== History ==
The British Journal of Pharmacology was established in 1946 as the British Journal of Pharmacology and Chemotherapy, and originally published by the British Medical Association. In its first few years, many publications in the journal came from exiled German pharmacologists who had resettled in the United Kingdom. The journal obtained its current title in 1968, when the journal moved publisher to Macmillan. It has been published by Wiley-Blackwell since 2009.

== The Concise Guide to PHARMACOLOGY ==
The Concise Guide to PHARMACOLOGY is a supplement of the British Journal of Pharmacology, superseding the "Guide to Receptors and Channels", a supplement first published in 2004 and one of two predecessors to the Guide to Pharmacology database. It is produced in association with the Nomenclature Committee of the International Union of Basic and Clinical Pharmacology. The current version, The Concise Guide to PHARMACOLOGY 2025/2026, was published in December 2025, and edited by Stephen Alexander, Eamonn Kelly, Alistair Mathie, John Peters and Emma Veale. This edition is a compilation of the major pharmacological targets divided into seven sections: G protein-coupled receptors, ion channels, catalytic receptors, nuclear receptors, transporters, and enzymes. These are presented with nomenclature guidance and summary information on the best available pharmacological tools, alongside suggestions for further reading. It is freely available online and also available in hard copy. Previous editions of the "Guide to Receptors and Channels" are available through PubMed Central. The content of the "Concise Guide to PHARMACOLOGY" is also available through the online portal Guide to PHARMACOLOGY.

== Abstracting and indexing ==
The journal is abstracted and indexed in:

- Academic OneFile
- Academic Search
- BIOSIS Previews
- CAB Abstracts
- Chemical Abstracts
- Chimica
- CINAHL
- Current Contents/Life Sciences
- Elsevier BIOBASE
- Embase
- Global Health
- Index Medicus/MEDLINE/PubMed
- Science Citation Index Expanded
- Scopus
- Tropical Diseases Bulletin

According to the Journal Citation Reports, the journal has a 2024 impact factor of 7.7.
