= Tremorine =

Chemical compound

Clinical data
- ATC code: none

Identifiers
- IUPAC name: 1-(4-pyrrolidin-1-ylbut-2-ynyl)pyrrolidine
- CAS Number: 51-73-0
- PubChem CID: 5534
- ChemSpider: 5333
- UNII: U817VZ1URQ
- CompTox Dashboard (EPA): DTXSID00199004

Chemical and physical data
- Formula: C_{12}H_{20}N_{2}
- Molar mass: 192.306 g·mol^{−1}
- 3D model (JSmol): Interactive image
- SMILES: C2CCCN2CC#CCN1CCCC1
- InChI: InChI=1S/C12H20N2/c1-2-8-13(7-1)11-5-6-12-14-9-3-4-10-14/h1-4,7-12H2; Key:JSUAJTLKVREZHV-UHFFFAOYSA-N

Tremorine is a drug which is used in scientific research to produce tremor in animals. This is used for the development of drugs for the treatment of Parkinson's disease, as tremor is a major symptom which is treated by anti-Parkinson's drugs. Beta blockers are also effective in counteracting the effects of tremorine.

== History ==
Tremorine was first reported by Everett et al. in 1956–57.

== See also ==
- Oxotremorine
