= Regina Peruggi =

American educator (born 1947)

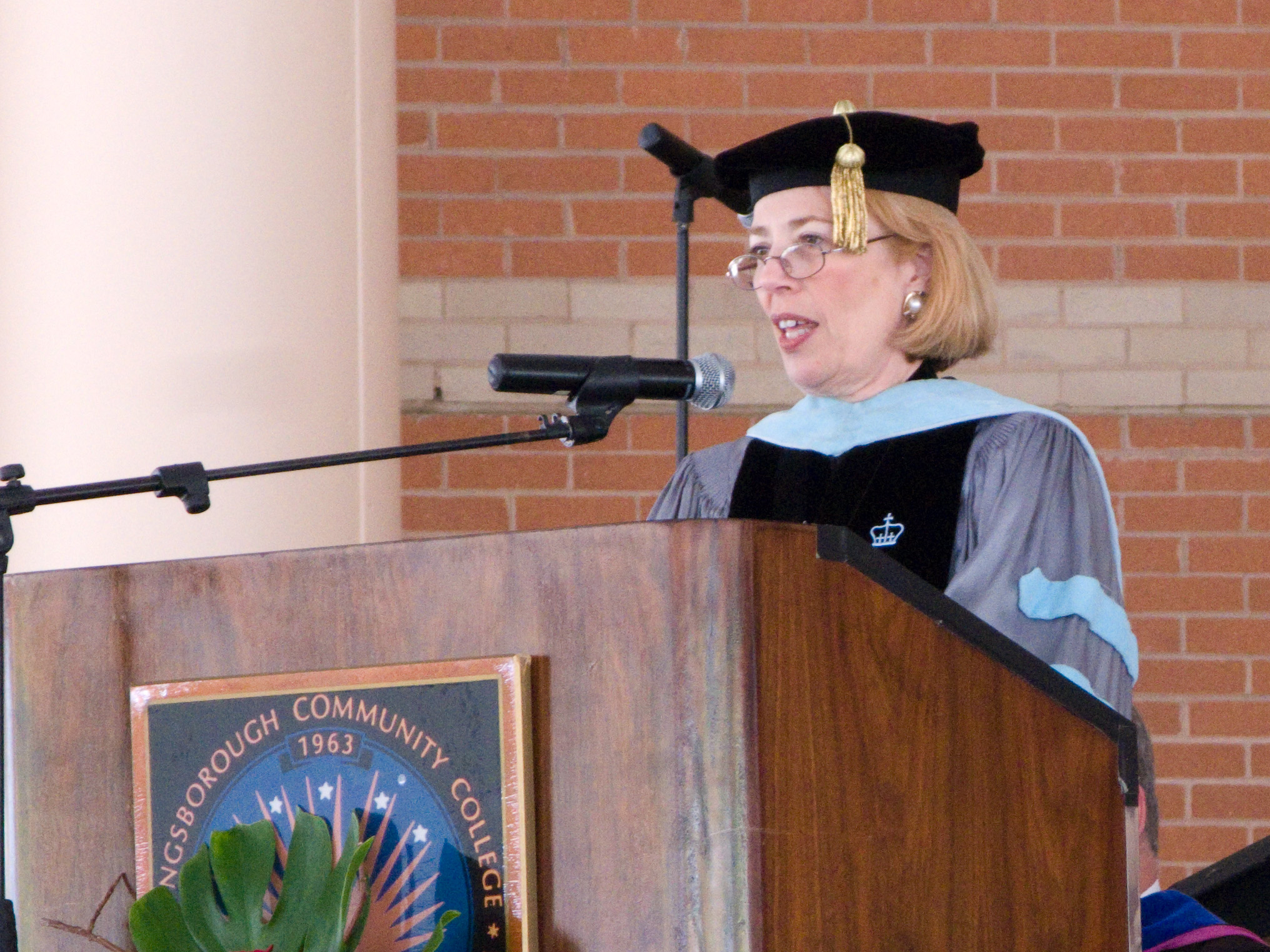
- Peruggi in 2008

President of Kingsborough Community College
- In office January 2005 – August 2014
- Preceded by: Fred Malamet
- Succeeded by: Stuart Suss (interim)

President of Marymount Manhattan College
- In office 1990–2001

Personal details
- Born: c. 1947 (age 78–79)
- Spouse: Rudy Giuliani (m. 1968; div. 1982)
- Education: College of New Rochelle (BA); New York University (MBA); Columbia University (EdD)
- Profession: Educator

Regina S. Peruggi McCallion (born c. 1947) is an American educator, who was the President of Kingsborough Community College from 2005 to 2014, the first woman to hold that position in the college's 40-year history. Prior to that, she was president of Marymount Manhattan College and led the Central Park Conservancy. For 14 years (from 1968 to 1982), she was married to her second cousin, Rudy Giuliani.

== Early life and education ==
Peruggi grew up in a middle class family in Bedford Park, Bronx. She is the daughter of Salvatore Orestus Peruggi and Anna Marie Fink. She is also the second cousin and ex-wife of former mayor of New York Rudy Giuliani. She attended Roman Catholic parochial schools. She earned a Bachelor of Arts in sociology from the College of New Rochelle in 1967.

== Career ==
She started her career as a drug abuse counselor in a state jail. She worked as a teacher at the elementary school, college, and graduate school levels. In 1974 she joined York College of The City University of New York, then moved to Washington, D.C., with Rudy Giuliani and worked as a coordinator at the Psychiatric Institute of Washington. Around 1980 she returned to school, and then earned a Master of Business Administration from New York University.

By 1984 Peruggi worked in the central office of the City University system, and again returned to school at night, earning a Doctor of Education from Teachers College, Columbia University. By 1986, she had become an associate dean for the City University of New York system, specializing in adult education programs.

In 1990, Peruggi was named president of Marymount Manhattan College, a position she held for eleven years; during this time the college's enrollment doubled. At Marymount, she was credited with turning around the institution financially, in part by recruiting wealthy business personages to the college's Board of Trustees. One professor said, "She's great at fund-raising, beefed up the student body and the faculty, devoted to community outreach and diversity, and brought a great moxie to the school."

She served as the second President of the Central Park Conservancy from 2001 to 2004, where she sought to continue its restoration via increased fund-raising and appeared on the PBS reality television show Back to the Floor.

Peruggi was named president of Kingsborough Community College in May 2004. Under Peruggi's leadership, Kingsborough Community College experienced record-high enrollment numbers. It was also named one of the top four community colleges in the country when it was chosen as a Finalist with Distinction for the 2013 Aspen Prize for Community College Excellence. Having reached age 65, she announced she was stepping down in April 2014, effective at the end of the coming summer.

Peruggi has served on the board of directors of the GreenPoint Foundation, the American Red Cross of Greater New York, the Silver Shield Foundation, and the Center for Redirection Through Education. In 2006 she was honored as a 2006 New York State Senate Woman of Distinction. By 2009, Peruggi was the Chairperson Emerita and Chairperson of the Commissioners of the Women's Commission For Refugee Women and Children; on the Board of Managers of the Havens Relief Fund Society; and on the boards of Berkeley College, the Academy of Mount St. Ursula High School, the Brooklyn Economic Development Corporation, the Brooklyn Chamber of Commerce, and the International Longevity Center. In 2008, Peruggi was named to the Commission on Lifelong Learning of the American Council on Education and around the same time was named to the Advisory Board of the Student World Assembly.

== Personal life ==
On October 26, 1968, Peruggi married Rudy Giuliani, her second cousin, whom she had known since childhood. In 1975, the couple agreed to a trial separation. Giuliani met local television personality Donna Hanover in 1982, and they began dating when she was working in Miami. Giuliani filed for legal separation from Peruggi on August 12, 1982. The Giuliani-Peruggi marriage legally ended in two ways: a civil divorce was issued by the end of 1982, while a Roman Catholic church annulment of the Giuliani-Peruggi marriage was granted at the end of 1983 reportedly because Giuliani had discovered that he and Peruggi were second cousins. Alan Placa, Giuliani's best man, later became a priest and helped get the annulment. Giuliani and Peruggi did not have any children.

She lives in Sutton Place, Manhattan.
