= Alan Placa =

American Catholic priest

- Church: Catholic Church
- Diocese: Rockville Centre
- Retired: December 2009

Orders
- Ordination: May 1970

Personal details
- Born: 1944 (age 81–82)

Alan J. Placa (born 1944) is an American Catholic priest of the Diocese of Rockville Centre.

== Friendship with Rudy Giuliani ==
Giuliani and Placa reportedly have been close friends since childhood. They attended Bishop Loughlin Memorial High School together in Brooklyn and were in opera club together. Placa was best man at Giuliani's wedding to Regina Peruggi in 1968. He then presided over Giuliani's wedding to Donna Hanover in 1982. He also assisted Giuliani in getting his marriage to Peruggi annulled so that he could marry Hanover. He also baptized Giuliani's two children, Andrew and Caroline.

In September 2002, only months after being barred from the ministry due to sexual abuse allegations, he received special permission from the diocese to preside over the funeral of Giuliani's mother, Helen because of his closeness to the family.

== Priesthood ==
In May 1970, Placa was ordained as a priest for the Diocese of Rockville Centre.

After his ordination, Placa began serving as a parish priest in Glen Cove, and in 1974 was assigned to teach at St. Pius X Preparatory Seminary.

In 1978, Placa left Pius to attend Hofstra University School of Law at the expense of the diocese as they were seeking an expert in social service law.

In 1992, Placa was appointed by the church to a three-person panel which handled accusations of sexual abuse by Roman Catholic priests in the Diocese of Rockville Centre. He also served as a legal consultant for the church on sexual abuse cases. Placa had admitted to consulting over 300 cases. This activity was allowed after sex abuse allegations by Placa, had been given to Bishop's office in the Diocese of Rockville Centre as well as another office had received abuse reports about Alan Placa.

In April 2002, Placa was placed on an administrative leave of absence by the Catholic Church following conflict of interest allegations. Several families of sexual abuse victims claimed that he had used his role as a spiritual adviser to gain information from victims to strengthen the diocese's legal position.

In June 2002, Placa was stripped of his right to function as a priest by the diocese after the Nassau County District Attorney's Office announced that Placa was under investigation for sexual abuse, specifically that he molested a teenage seminarian 25 years ago. Three other alleged victims subsequently came forward claiming Placa sexually abused them. Subsequently, a grand jury published a report accusing him of misconduct in sexually molesting a teenager and for covering up molestation by other priests. No criminal charges were filed.

In August 2002, he was hired by Giuliani to work at his consulting firm, Giuliani Partners.

He was subsequently cleared by a church tribunal. The Tribunal was to last six weeks according to David Berberian. It lasted over two years with the church delaying, rescheduling, and moving the tribunal dates repeatedly. The decision date by the church was completed after Alan Placa's 65th birthday, enabling him to be "exonerated" and immediately retire, by permission of Bishop Murphy of the Rockville Centre Diocese. Accuser/complainant Richard Tollner has never changed his testimony.

In December 2009, the Vatican upheld the tribunal's decision.
