= JCorps =

JCorps is an international social volunteer network of thousands of Jewish young adults, aged 18 to 30. Its web site says it was once active in New York City and Washington, D.C., Los Angeles, Denver, Boulder, Montreal, Jerusalem, Tel Aviv, Beer Sheva, Kyiv, Russia, London and Toronto. It is a non-denominational, independent organization.

JCorps was named the first "Social Volunteer Network" in the world. It volunteers in groups of 20, so that volunteers can, as is JCorps's motto, "Make Friends, and Make a Difference."

JCorps has had volunteers from over 180 colleges and universities, over 500 companies, and over 20 countries.

== Mission ==
JCorps' mission is to enable young Jewish adults to connect while making a difference through volunteering. It provides a low-pressure, high-activity environment where people can get to know each other while working on a shared task.

Volunteers feed the hungry in soup kitchens, entertain the elderly in senior centers, play with children in hospitals, and clean and improve the landscapes of city parks, among other activities and mega events.

== History ==
JCorps International, Inc. was founded in December, 2006 in New York City by comedian and business entrepreneur Ari Teman. It began with a website and Facebook group and quickly grew to thousands of members at its height.

In May 2008, JCorps began operations in Montreal, and in July 2008 it opened in Jerusalem and Toronto. JCorps held its first event in Washington D.C. in September, 2009.

On August 7, 2008, JCorps was invited to Gracie Mansion, the official residence of New York Mayor Michael Bloomberg, for a barbecue to honor volunteers.

Except for four months in 2010, JCorps has been entirely volunteer-run. On April 12, 2010, JCorps hired its first staff person, a COO, to support the volunteer Division Leaders and Team Leaders around the world. JCorps returned to being volunteer-run four months later.
