= Caroline Giuliani =

American filmmaker (born 1989)

- Born: Caroline Rose Giuliani; August 22, 1989 (age 37); New York City, New York, U.S.
- Education: Harvard University (BA)
- Political party: Democratic
- Parents: Rudy Giuliani; Donna Hanover
- Relatives: Andrew Giuliani (brother)
- Website: Official website

Caroline Rose Giuliani (born August 22, 1989) is an American filmmaker, political activist, and writer. She is the daughter of Rudy Giuliani, the former mayor of New York City. Giuliani has received national media attention for publicly disagreeing with, and criticizing, her father's politics and political endorsements.

== Early life and family ==
Giuliani was born in 1989 to Donna Hanover, a journalist and television personality, and Rudy Giuliani, an attorney and Republican politician; she was given Rose as her middle name. She is of Italian descent on her father's side. Her paternal great-grandparents, Rodolfo and Evangelina Giuliani, were from Tuscany. Her great-uncle, Tullio "Leo" D'Avanzo, operated a loan sharking and gambling ring at a restaurant in Brooklyn. She has an older brother, Andrew Giuliani, who was born in 1986. He served as Special Assistant to the President and associate director of the Office of Public Liaison for President Donald Trump.

Gracie Mansion, where Giuliani lived from age 4–12.

Prior to her birth, Giuliani's father had served as the U.S. Attorney for the Southern District of New York and as the U.S. Associate Attorney General. In the 1993 New York City mayoral election, her father was elected mayor of New York City, and the family moved into Gracie Mansion in 1994, the official mayoral residence in Carl Schurz Park. In October 2000 her parents filed for divorce and her father moved out of Gracie Mansion in August of the following year. Giuliani continued to live at Gracie Mansion with her mother and brother until her father's term ended in December 2001. The family relocated to a home in East Manhattan. Her parents' divorce was finalized in 2002. In 2003, her father married Judith Nathan, a nurse and medical sales executive, and her mother married Edwin Oster, an attorney. In 2018, her father joined President Trump's legal team. Giuliani has been estranged from her father since her parents' divorce.

Giuliani was raised in the Catholic faith and was baptized by Monsignor Alan Placa. She was educated at Trinity School, a private school in Manhattan that is part of the Ivy Preparatory School League, graduating in 2007. She attended Harvard College, where she studied theatre and film production. At Harvard, Giuliani served as the experimental theater coordinator of the Harvard Radcliffe Dramatic Club and interned with documentary filmmaker Ross McElwee. Giuliani also trained with the Atlantic Theater Company in New York, the Royal Academy of Dramatic Art in London, and Collaborative Arts Project 21, a partnership with New York University's Tisch School of the Arts.

== Career ==
Giuliani is a filmmaker, writer, and director creating work focusing on mental health and human sexuality. Giuliani began her work in the film and television industry as a production assistant in Hollywood, working on ABC's supernatural drama series 666 Park Avenue (2012–2013) and the sitcom Trophy Wife (2013–2014), as well as the HBO sitcom Hello Ladies (2013–2014). After working as a production assistant, she became the assistant of Steve Beeks, the co-president and Co-Chief Operating Officer of Lionsgate. She later worked for Gotham Group as an assistant to producer Jeremy Bell. She was promoted by Ellen Goldsmith-Vein and began running her own office as a junior manager and television coordinator. After leaving Gotham, she worked as the director's assistant on Netflix's 2019 romantic comedy Someone Great. In 2020, she wrote and directed Or (Someone) Else, a psychological thriller short film about a woman struggling in an abusive relationship and the mental health ramifications of repressed anger.

== Personal life ==
Giuliani is pansexual, as well as polyamorous. She previously identified as bisexual. On August 4, 2010, she was arrested by the NYPD and charged with petty larceny for shoplifting from the Sephora store on East 86th Street. She was detained and later released. Represented by attorney Michael F. Bachner, Giuliani took a plea deal to perform one day of community service and had her criminal record cleared after a probation period of six months.

=== Political views ===
Despite coming from a prominent Republican family, Giuliani has supported Democratic candidates. During the 2008 U.S. presidential election, while her father was seeking the Republican nomination, she joined a Facebook group supporting Barack Obama called One Million Strong for Barack, and posted on her profile that she was a "liberal". Giuliani left the Facebook group after online activity was reported in the media. She supported Hillary Clinton in the 2016 U.S. presidential election, while her father was a vocal supporter of Donald Trump. In 2016, when questioned about her political beliefs conflicting with her father's, she stated "he knows and is fully comfortable with it and thinks I have a right to my opinion." On September 30, 2020, Giuliani tweeted a response to a tweet made by her father accusing Hunter Biden of being a liar. She stated, "I, for one, do not support spreading false gossip about a politician’s child."

On October 15, 2020, Giuliani wrote a piece for Vanity Fair titled "Rudy Giuliani Is My Father. Please, Everyone, Vote for Joe Biden and Kamala Harris", calling for American voters to end Trump's "reign of terror" and encouraging them to "elect a compassionate and decent president." In response to her father being a Trump supporter, Giuliani stated, "I may not be able to change my father's mind, but together, we can vote this toxic administration out of office." She went on to say, "if being the daughter of a polarizing mayor who became the president's personal bulldog has taught me anything, it is that corruption starts with 'yes-men' and women, the cronies who create an echo chamber of lies and subservience to maintain their proximity to power." She accused the first Trump administration of stoking "the injustice that already permeated" society, and criticized Trump's handling of the COVID-19 pandemic in the United States and his policies that rolled back protections for the LGBTQ community, women, immigrants, people with disabilities, and people of color. She went on to endorse former U.S. Vice President Joe Biden and Senator Kamala Harris for the 2020 U.S. presidential election, and praised Biden's plans to combat climate change. Giuliani later tweeted a photo of herself and Harris.

On November 24, 2020, Giuliani wrote a second piece for Vanity Fair, titled "Attention, Trumpworld: Self-Care Tips for Accepting the Reality That Trump Lost". On September 30, 2024, Giuliani endorsed Vice President Harris for the 2024 U.S. presidential election, writing in Vanity Fair: "I've been grieving the loss of my dad to Trump. I cannot bear to lose our country to him too."
