= Daniel L. Burrows =

American politician (1908–1990)

Daniel L. Burrows (January 23, 1908 – June 3, 1990) was an American politician from New York who was elected to the New York State Assembly between 1939 and 1944. He was African American. A Democrat, he represented Harlem as a committeeman. He was the father-in-law of New York City's first black mayor David Dinkins.

Burrows was born in Cape Charles, Virginia, on January 23, 1908, and raised in New York City from the age of three. He worked as a real estate and insurance broker, and was a cofounder of the United Mutual Life Insurance Company. Burrows became active in Tammany Hall. By 1938, Burrows had been appointed to the Democratic Party's state committee, as a representative of Manhattan. He was elected to the 19th district seat on the New York State Assembly, succeeding Robert W. Justice, serving from 1939 to 1944 in the 162nd, 163rd, and 164th New York State Legislatures. In October 1939, Burrows was elected to the executive committee of Tammany Hall.

Daniel L. Burrows was married to Elaine until her death in 1975. He died on June 3, 1990, aged 82, while seeking treatment for cancer at Calvary Hospital. The couple had two daughters, Gloria and Joyce. Joyce Dinkins, who married David Dinkins, the Mayor of New York City from 1990 to 1993, became the city's first African-American first lady. A Callery pear tree was planted at Gracie Mansion to memorialize Burrows.

== See also ==
- List of African-American officeholders (1900–1959)

New York State Assembly
Preceded by Robert W. Justice	New York State Assembly; New York County, 19th District; 1939–1944	Succeeded by district abolished
