= Michael F. Bachner =

American criminal defense attorney

Michael Bachner
- Born: August 13, 1956 (age 70); Passaic, New Jersey
- Education: Rutgers University (BA); Hofstra University (JD)
- Occupation: Attorney
- Spouse: Margie Bachner
- Children: 3

Michael Bachner (born August 13, 1956) is an American criminal defense and securities litigation attorney. He is the founder of Bachner & Associates, P.C. located in New York City. Bachner has represented numerous high-profile figures in the political, sports, entertainment, and business communities, and is frequently quoted by national media outlets. Bachner started his career as an associate for legendary criminal defense attorney Benjamin Brafman, with whom he occasionally works to defend clients in high-profile trials.

== Early life and education ==
Bachner was born in Passaic, New Jersey to a Jewish family. Bachner attended yeshiva day school in Passaic and yeshiva high-school in Elizabeth, New Jersey. Bachner graduated Phi Beta Kappa from Rutgers University in New Brunswick, New Jersey in 1978 majoring in criminal justice, and was appointed to the Student Judiciary Committee in 1976. Bachner received his Juris Doctor degree from Hofstra University in 1981 where he was elected to the law school student council, and served for two years as the student assistant to the criminal law professor.

== Career ==
After graduating from law school, Bachner was hired as the first associate for criminal defense attorney, Benjamin Brafman. After four years, Bachner became an Assistant District Attorney in the Manhattan District Attorney's Office serving under the Hon. Robert M. Morgenthau, in the Narcotics Bureau, the Trial Bureau and in the Rackets Bureau. In 1987 Bachner joined the Law Department of Prudential Securities, and in 1988 he opened his own law practice in Manhattan. Bachner has represented several notable figures, including former New York City Police Commissioner Bernard Kerik, Anthony Jones, former bodyguard to Sean P. Diddy Combs, former New York Giants linebacker Antonio Pierce, actor Robert Iler, Caroline Giuliani (daughter of former New York City Mayor Rudy Giuliani), Hillary Weston, the business manager of rap star Lil' Kim, and in civil matters, actors-directors Carl and Rob Reiner. In his earlier career he represented several organized crime figures including John Papa, who was convicted of a series of mob-related homicides. Bachner also successfully cross-examined Jordan Belfort, the so-called "Wolf of Wall Street", in a high-profile stock-fraud trial.

== Personal life ==
Bachner's parents lived through The Holocaust, detained in Bergen-Belsen concentration camp until they were liberated in 1945 by the Russian army. They came to the U.S. in 1954. Bachner is married to his wife, Margie, and reside in New Jersey where they have three children.
