= Academy of Mount St. Ursula =

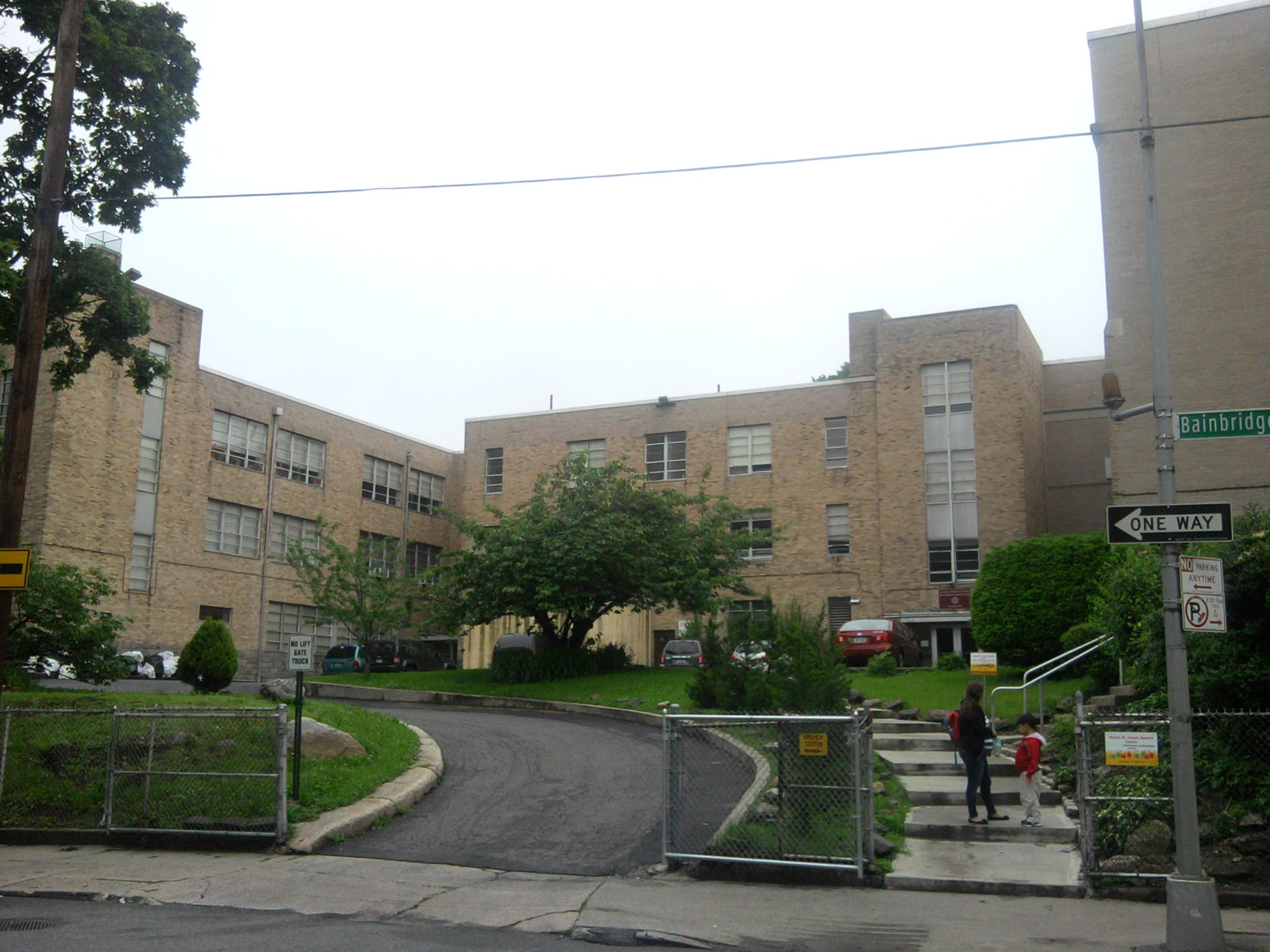

Location
- 330 Bedford Park Boulevard; Bronx, New York 10458; United States; 40°52′7″N 73°53′10″W

Information
- Type: Private
- Motto: Serviam (I shall serve.)
- Religious affiliation: Roman Catholic
- Established: 1855 (171 years ago)
- Authority: Ursuline Sisters of the Roman Union
- Oversight: Roman Catholic Archdiocese of New York
- Grades: 7–12
- Gender: Girls
- Student to teacher ratio: 15:1
- Campus size: 3 acres (1.2 ha)
- Campus type: Urban
- Colors: Maroon and white
- Slogan: Academics, Arts, Service. "Four Years To Last A Lifetime."
- Athletics conference: Catholic High School Athletic Association
- Mascot: Lady Bear
- Accreditation: Middle States Association of Colleges and Schools
- Publication: Melange (literary journal)
- Newspaper: The Mount
- Yearbook: Montis
- Tuition: $9,950
- Website: amsu.org

The Academy of Mount St. Ursula is a Catholic girls' college preparatory school founded in 1855 as a part of the Monastery of St. Ursula in the town of Morrisania (now a part of the Bronx, New York City). It is the oldest continuously operating Catholic high school for girls in the State of New York, and is located in the Archdiocese of New York.

In 1892, the monastery relocated to Bedford Park Boulevard and Bainbridge Avenue, two blocks east of the Grand Concourse, in the Bronx. The school has been honored by the United States Department of Education as a Blue Ribbon School. The academy continues to be accredited by the Middle States Association Commissions on Elementary and Secondary Schools.

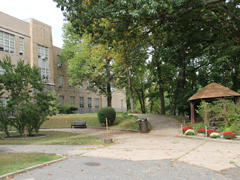
The school in the spring of 2014

== Location and history ==
=== Foundation ===
In 1854, John Casper Metzler, C.Ss.R., the first pastor of the German-speaking Church of the Immaculate Conception, requested that a group of Ursulines from St. Louis, Missouri, come to his new parish in Melrose, then the southern tip of Westchester County, to teach girls. The nuns, who had arrived in St. Louis in 1848, had originally come from Ödenburg (now Sopron), in the Kingdom of Hungary, and Landshut, in the Kingdom of Bavaria. As their first missionary community had grown quickly, the nuns visited the village of Melrose and accepted the invitation with the permission of their archbishop, Peter Kenrick. On May 15, 1855, Mother Magdalen Stehlin, O.S.U., set out again for Melrose with three companions to establish a new monastery there.

By the end of the summer there were 11 Ursuline nuns in the area living with the Hennings and other families while the monastery was being built. It is said that Archbishop John Hughes himself chose the site in the village of Morrisania, near what is now the intersection of Cauldwell and Westchester Avenues.

=== The early years ===
By October 1, 1855, the monastery had been completed and occupied by the Ursulines and began to offer classes. Almost immediately, the school students and the young girls choosing to enter the monastery came from both the German-speaking community of Immaculate Conception and beyond. The academy and monastery were incorporated together by the New York State legislature in 1868 as the Ursuline Convent.

=== Morrisania expansion ===
At the time the nuns arrived, Morrisania was a sparsely populated, brand new suburb of the City of New York, the result of a series of decisions by members of the Morris family to open their estate lands for development. The population grew rapidly, and so did the industrial base: foundries, breweries, carpentry shops, tailoring establishments and slaughterhouses. With the rapid population growth and a change in the demographics, more demands were put on the charitable works of the nuns. The Ursuline nuns branched out to begin other academies and staff other parochial schools in New York and beyond.

Eager for clean Croton water and city services, voters of the southern edge of Westchester county chose to merge their territory into New York City in 1874. Meanwhile, the nuns were already considering relocating northward to escape the encroachment of industry right at their threshold and the projected purchase of their property for streets. The actual move, however, did not occur until 1892, when the Ursuline Monastery and academy (up to that point under the official name of St. Joseph Monastery), moved to Bedford Park Boulevard; with the relocation, the complex began using the name Mount St. Ursula to reflect both the hilly topography of the new site and the patroness of their Order. By 1900, the New York State curriculum and Regents examinations were introduced and the Alumnae Association was founded.

=== Dissolution of the monastery ===
With the changes in the life and structures of Roman Catholic religious institutes in the 1960s mandated by the Second Vatican Council, the Ursulines began to shed many of the monastic practices which had been imposed on them in the 16th century. They began to explore living in small, non-institutional settings and non-traditional ministries. In addition to these changes, a sharp decrease in the number of applicants to the Order led to the numbers of nuns in their communities to decline sharply during that period.

By the start of the 21st century, the nuns at the Mount had been so decreased in numbers through retirement and death, that the community chose to transfer to their regional headquarters located in New Rochelle, New York. As of July 2014, the principal was an Ursuline Sister and two other Sisters serve the school through Service Coordination and Mission Effectiveness. It is currently a layperson.

In 2011, a piece of the monastery portion of the property was developed into Serviam Gardens, an affordable senior housing complex with 243 units, planned also to serve as a model of green energy architecture.

== Administration ==
The school is owned and administered by the Ursuline Sisters of the Roman Union. Qualified students may earn college credit in their junior and senior years.

With a faculty and staff of 55, mainly lay personnel, and approximately 380 students, the academy has a teacher–student ratio of 1 to 15 and an average class size of 20 to 25 students.

== Notable alumnae ==
- Ellen Alemany, CEO, Royal Bank of Scotland, North America
- Grace Andreacchi, novelist, poet and playwright
- Patricia Breslin, actress
- Regina Peruggi, President, Kingsborough Community College, Brooklyn, New York (retired)
- Pierina Sanchez, Member of New York City Council,
- Vice Admiral Patricia Tracey, United States Navy, Washington, D.C. (retired)

== Students ==
- Current enrollment is approximately 380. Student-teacher ratio is 15:1. The average class size is 24.
- Students come from 60 elementary schools, mainly in the Bronx, Manhattan, and Queens, with some from Westchester County and New Jersey.
