= Andromache Books =

British non-profit publishing firm

Andromache Books is a United-Kingdom-based, independent, not-for-profit publishing firm, run as a writers' cooperative by the writers themselves. It was founded in 2008 by authors Grace Andreacchi and Elisabeth Serafimovski in London. Andromache Books specialises in literary fiction and poetry, with a particular interest in postmodern and experimental literature. Authors to date include Grace Andreacchi, Mikael Covey, Mark Edwards, Gabriel Olearnik and artist Alexandra Rozenman.

== Andromache Studio ==
Under the imprint Andromache Studio, they also publish plays for the modern theatre.
