= Grace Andreacchi =

American-born author

- Born: December 3, 1954 (age 71); New York City, U.S.
- Occupations: Novelist; poet; playwright
- Writing career
- Period: 1985–present
- Genres: Metafiction, postmodern theater
- Movements: Modernism, post-modernism, surrealism
- Website: graceandreacchi.com

Grace Andreacchi (born December 3, 1954) is an American-born author known for her blend of poetic language and modernism with a post-modernist sensibility. Andreacchi is active as a novelist, poet and playwright.

== Biography ==
Grace Andreacchi was born in New York City and grew up in the Inwood section of Manhattan. She was educated at the Academy of Mount St. Ursula High School, and went on to study theatre at the Stella Adler Studio. A brief period on the stage was followed by the study of philosophy, first at Hunter College (New York City), and then at Binghamton University (Binghamton, New York). In her final year she received a fellowship to study at Bedford College, London. Since 1989 Andreacchi has lived in Europe, moving first to Paris, then rural Normandy, and later to Berlin (1994–1998) and London, where she now lives. In 2008 she founded Andromache Books, a writers' cooperative, to publish literary fiction and poetry.

== Works ==
Her first work was the play Vegetable Medley (1985, Soho Repertory Theater, New York and Boston Center for the Arts, Boston, Massachusetts), an experimental work fusing elements of comedy and melodrama in a highly poeticised language. Her first novel, Give My Heart Ease (1989), received the New American Writing Award and was translated into Slovenian as Pomiri mi srce. Admired by some critics, others found its frank depiction of an abusive sexual relationship disturbing.

Her 1993 novel, Music for Glass Orchestra, garnered much critical acclaim for its wildly beautiful, surrealistic style. Set in Paris, it contains a wide-ranging discourse on the music of J.S. Bach, with special attention to the Sonatas and Partitas for Solo Violin. Her first collection of poetry, Elysian Sonnets and Other Poems (1990) was published as a chapbook in Paris.

In 1995 Andreacchi was a collaborator in the project Violin Music in the Age of Shopping, a work by avant-garde composer and violinist Jon Rose. For her contribution Andreacchi was made an Honorary Fellow of the Rosenberg Foundation (Sydney, Australia).

The novel Scarabocchio (1995), an architecturally adventurous ‘inverted fugue’, is based on Goethe’s Italian Journey, and continues the discussion of Bach through the character of ‘Barton Beale’, a lightly fictionalized Glenn Gould. The short novel Poetry and Fear (2001) is set in the Berlin opera world, and uses the myth of Orpheus to explore themes of love and loss. Later works showed an increased emphasis on Christian spiritual themes. A continued interest in the culture of the far east is reflected in Two Brothers (2007), a version of the Korean pansori tale Heungbu and Nolbu. Recent work has shown a turning away from Christianity towards an avowedly feminist point of view. Her semi-autobiographical novel You Are There Behind My Eyelids Forever, a coming of age story with feminist and erotic content, is set in the Inwood of her childhood.

== Publications ==
=== Novels ===
- Give My Heart Ease ISBN 0-932966-90-X : The Permanent Press (1989)
- Music for Glass Orchestra ISBN 1-85242-299-8 (1993)
- The Prodigy ISBN 978-1-4452-0980-7 (1994, first complete print edition 2009)
- Scarabocchio ISBN 978-1-4092-3643-6 (2008)
- Poetry and Fear ISBN 978-1-4092-3642-9 (2008)
- You Are There Behind My Eyelids Forever ISBN 978-0-244-52504-0 (2021)

=== Plays ===
- Vegetable Medley (1985)
- Raphael and Tobias (1994)
- Two Brothers ISBN 978-1-4092-3672-6 (2007)
- Agnes in Dappled Things 2008
- Lawrence in Dappled Things 2008
- Two Martyr Plays ISBN 978-1-4092-3768-6 (contains both Agnes and Lawrence) (2009)
- Raphael and Tobias ISBN 978-1-4461-3340-8, ebook version ISBN 978-1-4461-2880-0. 2010

=== Short fiction ===
- The Golden Dolphins (The Carolina Quarterly 1991)
- The Black Swan (1994)
- Violin Music in the Age of Shopping -The Judy Papers (Editors Jon Rose and Rainer Linz) ISBN 0-646-18105-X,(NMA Publications, 1994)
- Golden Vanities, Stories, Tales and Occasional Pieces (2018) ISBN 978-0-244-10691-1, (Andromache Books, 2018)

=== Poetry ===
- Elysian Sonnets and Other Poems (The Paris Press 1990)
- Songs for a Mad Queen (2000)
- Two Hands Clapping (with artist Alexandra Rozenman) ISBN 978-1-4092-9978-3 (2009)
- Berlin Elegies ISBN 978-1-4452-1640-9, ebook ISBN 978-1-4461-2878-7 (2010)
- Little Poems for Children ISBN 978-1-4457-6338-5 (2010)
- Ten Poems for the End of Time ISBN 978-1-326-49489-6 (2015)
- Beauty Has a Thousand Faces: Selected Poems ISBN 978-1-4466-2893-5, ebook ISBN 978-1-4478-1026-1 (2024)
- Thelonious Magpie: A Book of Found Poems ISBN 978-1-4461-5202-7, ebook ISBN 978-1-4461-2505-2 (2024)
- Worm Bug Feather: One Hundred Very Short Poems ISBN 978-1-4461-5968-2, ebook ISBN 978-1-4461-7833-1 (2024)
- Multas per Gentes: Poems in Translation ISBN 978-1-4461-5850-0, ebook ISBN 978-1-4461-5561-5 (2025)
