= Robert W. Justice =

American politician

Robert W. Justice was a state legislator in New York. He represented New York City's 19th District in the New York Assembly. He served from 1936 to 1938 and was preceded by James E. Stephens and succeeded by Daniel L. Burrows.

In 1936, he sought to have a building for "Negro" exhibits included at New York's Fair.

He introduced a bill to protect street lottery ("numbers") players from being arrested and charged.

He was part of the Conference for Legislation in the National Interest. Justice is listed as a subject in the New York Public Library's Ewart Guinier photographic collection.

== See also ==
- List of African-American officeholders (1900–1959)
- 159th New York State Legislature
- 161st New York State Legislature

New York State Assembly
Preceded by James E. Stephens	New York State Assembly; New York County, 19th District; 1936–1938	Succeeded by Daniel L. Burrows
