= Gracie Mansion =

New York City mayoral residence

- Archibald Gracie Mansion
- U.S. National Register of Historic Places
- New York State Register of Historic Places
- New York City Landmark
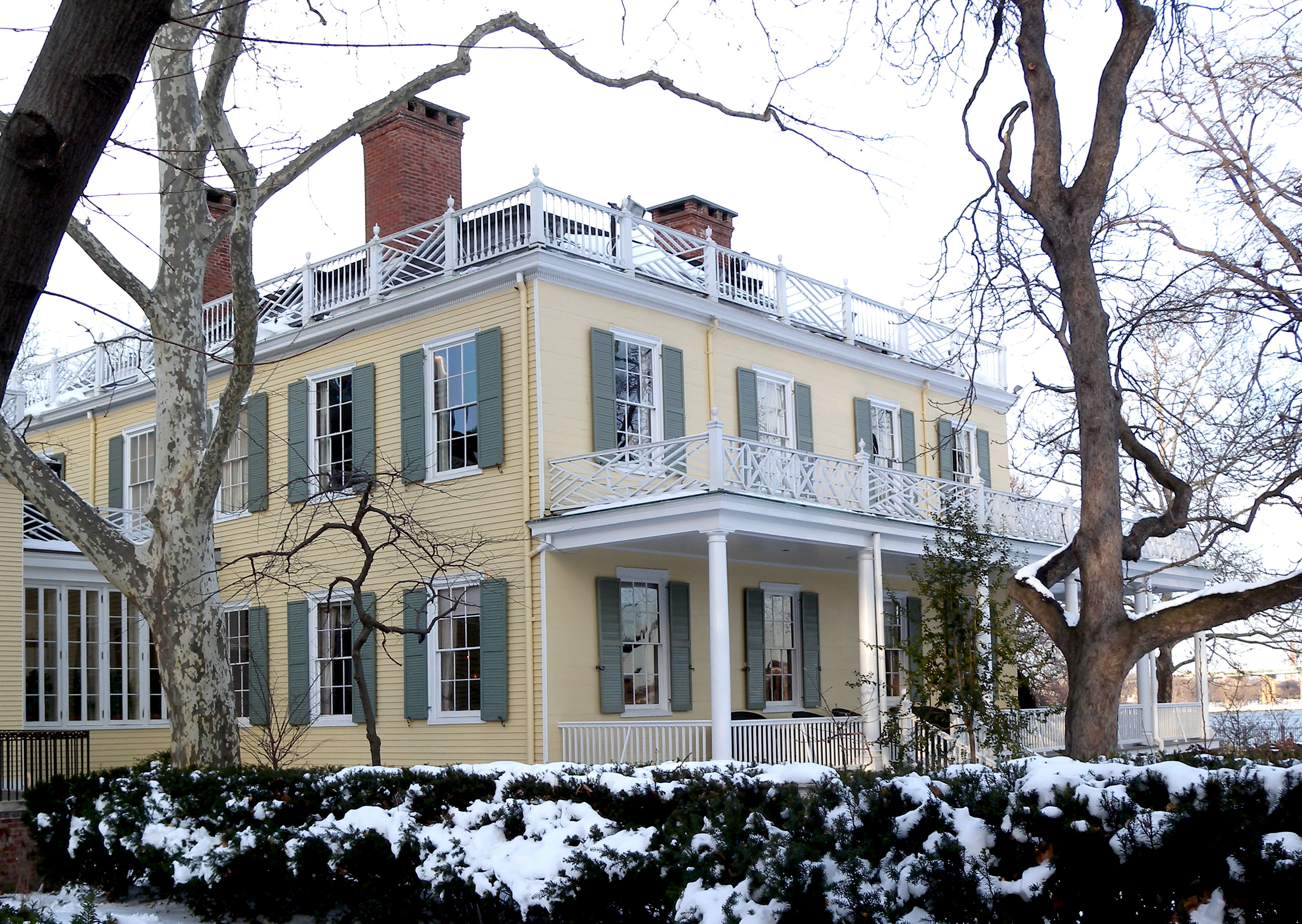
- East front
- Interactive map of Archibald Gracie Mansion
- Location: East End Ave. at 88th St., Manhattan, New York
- Coordinates: 40°46′34″N 73°56′35″W
- Built: 1799; 227 years ago
- Architect: Archibald Gracie
- Architectural style: Federal Style
- Website: graciemansion.org
- NRHP reference No.: 75001205
- NYSRHP No.: 06101.000009
- NYCL No.: 0179

Significant dates
- Added to NRHP: May 12, 1975
- Designated NYSRHP: June 23, 1980
- Designated NYCL: September 20, 1966

Gracie Mansion (also known as Archibald Gracie Mansion) is the official residence of the mayor of New York City. Built in 1799, it is located in Carl Schurz Park, at East End Avenue and 88th Street in the Yorkville neighborhood of Manhattan. The federal-style mansion overlooks Hell Gate in the East River and consists of the original two-story house and an annex built in 1966. The original house is a New York City designated landmark and is listed on the National Register of Historic Places.

The house's site was previously occupied by Belview Mansion, built in 1770 for local merchant Jacob Walton and destroyed during the American Revolutionary War. In 1799, Archibald Gracie built a new house on the same site, which he used as his country home until 1823. The family of Joseph Foulke used the house from 1823 to 1857, and the family of builder Noah Wheaton used it from 1857 to 1896, when the municipal government made its grounds part of Carl Schurz Park. During the early 20th century, the mansion was used as public restrooms, an ice cream stand, and classrooms. Gracie Mansion housed the Museum of the City of New York from 1924 to 1936, and it was a historic house museum until 1942, when it became a mayoral residence. Since then, each mayor except for Michael Bloomberg has lived at Gracie Mansion at some point during their tenure; most mayors redecorated the house upon taking office. A reception wing, named for New York City first lady Susan Wagner, was completed in 1966. Further major renovations took place in 1983–1984 and in 2002.

The facade is composed of clapboard panels with shutters. The original mansion's first floor includes parlors, a dining room, a kitchen, and a library; the annex also includes a ballroom and reception rooms. The second floor has been traditionally used as bedrooms, while the basements contain offices. The mansion's upkeep is partially overseen by the Gracie Mansion Conservancy, although the city government continues to own it. In addition to governmental business and special events, Gracie Mansion hosts public tours. Over the years, the house has been the subject of commentary, and it has also received accolades and has been depicted in numerous media works.

== Site ==
Gracie Mansion, also known as Archibald Gracie Mansion, is located in Carl Schurz Park (at East End Avenue and 88th Street) in the Yorkville neighborhood of Manhattan in New York City. The mansion faces northeast toward Hell Gate, a channel in the East River. By the early 21st century, it was the only remaining country estate in Yorkville. Gracie Mansion sits atop Carl Schurz Park's highest point.

=== Previous site usage ===
The Europeans established their first settlements in modern-day New York City in the 17th century. From that point until the end of the 19th century, only six men owned the site. The first European owner of Gracie Mansion's site was Sybout Claessan, who received either 30 acres (12 ha) or 106 acres (43 ha) from the Dutch West India Company in 1646. Claessan's land, which includes Carl Schurz Park, was initially known as Hoorn's Hook or Horn's Hook, after the city of Hoorn in North Holland. The site was alternately known as Horen Hook, Harris' Hook, or Harris' Point. Dutch immigrant Resolved Waldron obtained the land in 1690 after Claessan died; it passed through three other members of the Waldron family over the next eight decades and was subdivided after William Waldron's death in 1769.

Jacob Walton, a merchant from what is now Flatbush in Brooklyn, obtained 11 acres (4.5 ha) around Hoorn's Hook and built a house, Belview Mansion, on the site in 1770. He moved into the house with his wife Polly Cruger. Drawings indicate that the earlier mansion was composed of a two-story central section and one-story wings on either side. Ornamentation on that house included quoins at its corners; keystones above the windows; a weather vane and finials at the roof; and a triple bay of windows at the end of each wing. The Waltons were forced to leave the house in February 1776, during the American Revolutionary War, and the site became a Continental Army fort, which was completed in April 1776. The house was severely damaged by cannonball fire on September 8 or September 15, 1776. British troops controlled the site until 1783.

The Waltons never went back to Belview; their four children did not receive the land until 1791. Belview Mansion included a hidden tunnel to the East River, which still existed when Gracie Mansion was developed on the same site. The brick tunnel ran north from the mansion's basement and then turned east toward the river. It is not known why the tunnel was built, but one newspaper said the tunnel could have been used as an escape route during the American Revolution or as a secret lover's entrance. For more than two centuries, there was little documentation on Belview Mansion's existence. One of the cannonballs that destroyed the mansion was later displayed.

== Early history ==
=== Gracie occupancy ===
The merchant Archibald Gracie, at the time one of New York City's richest men, bought Walton's land in two phases in December 1798 and January 1799. At the time, the Gracies' city residence was a house that they rented from New York City mayor Richard Varick. Gracie built a new country estate on the Walton site in 1799, though there is disagreement over whether Gracie destroyed or reused the remains of Belview Mansion. (Note: Contemporary drawings and art showed the house as having been completely destroyed. Robert E. Meadows, who helped restore the house in the 1980s, theorizes that it is unlikely Belview Mansion was destroyed, as the materials were in decent condition and were not cheap to replace. Mary Beth Betts of the New York City Landmarks Preservation Commission says that, although contemporary sources said the house was destroyed, later investigations indicated that parts of Belview Mansion may have been preserved.) In either case, Gracie removed the Revolutionary War-era earthworks and landscaped the gardens. Gracie's mansion was abutted to the west by the house of banker Nathaniel Prime, which later became St. Joseph's Orphan Asylum. Other houses along the East River included those of the Rhinelander family, Alexander Hamilton, John Jacob Astor, and Isaac Chauncey, which have long since been demolished. Gracie Mansion, at the time, was accessible only via the East River and was several miles from the developed parts of Lower Manhattan. There was a dock and a stone stable just south of the house.

In 1801, Gracie hosted a meeting of New York Federalists at the mansion to raise funds for the establishment of the New York Evening Post, which eventually became the New York Post. During the city's 1803 yellow fever epidemic, the house's isolated position allowed Gracie to avoid infected people in the city. Although the house originally faced southeast, it was expanded in 1804 to face northeast toward Hell Gate. The mansion was valued at $5,200 (Note: About $118,918 in 2025 (Note: Johnston, Louis; Williamson, Samuel H. (2023). "What Was the U.S. GDP Then?". MeasuringWorth. United States Gross Domestic Product deflator figures follow the MeasuringWorth series.)) by 1809. Further expansions were completed in 1811; the work included relocating the main entrance, adding a pantry and parlor at ground level, and adding two bedrooms upstairs. Cannons were installed during the War of 1812 to defend the house's elevated site, and the house itself may have served as a military post.

The house entertained up to fifty guests at a time. Gracie hosted guests such as Hamilton, Astor, future French king Louis Philippe I, U.S. president John Quincy Adams, and writers James Fenimore Cooper and Washington Irving. The Riker, Rhinelander, and Schermerhorn families were also guests, as were the poet Thomas Moore, U.S. Army general Winfield Scott, and New York governor DeWitt Clinton. Future Boston mayor Josiah Quincy III, who also stopped by the mansion, described the house as "elegant" and the grounds as having a tasteful layout. Irving may have written part of his novel Astoria while at the house, and he wrote in 1813 that "I cannot tell you how sweet and delightful I found this retreat, pure air, agreeable scenery and profound quiet".

Gracie continued to maintain a residence in Lower Manhattan; he bought a new city residence at 1 State Street in 1805 and moved to another house at 15 State Street in 1813. Gracie was so wealthy that, when he lost $1 million (Note: About $24.71 million in 2025) in 1807 due to naval blockades, his net worth was unaffected. Although Gracie's firm lost more than $1 million (Note: About $22.91 million in 2025) during the War of 1812, he used the house as his country home until 1823. Ultimately, the aftermath of the war depleted his finances. Two of U.S. Founding Father Rufus King's sons married two of Gracie's daughters, and King bought the mansion prior to 1823. King placed the mansion for sale in April 1823, and Gracie's company, Archibald Gracie & Son, was dissolved the next month.

=== Foulke use ===
The same year as Gracie's firm was dissolved, the house was sold to Joseph Foulke, a slave owner who had gained his wealth from trading largely in Central America and the Caribbean, and exploiting the labor of enslaved people there. Foulke paid $20,500 (Note: About $686,777 in 2025) for the house and about 11 acres (4.5 ha) of land, which became known as Foulke's Point. Initially, the Foulke family used Gracie Mansion only as a summer mansion, but they eventually used the house as their primary residence. The Foulkes added a fireplace mantel in the parlor but are not known to have made any other modifications. When Foulke died in 1852, the mansion and estate were passed to his seven children, and the land was subsequently divided.

=== Wheaton use ===
Foulke's family sold the house in 1857 to a builder named Noah Wheaton, who also purchased 12 adjacent lots. By then, many of the estates on the East River were being replaced with industrial development. Wheaton added a two-story brick stable north of the mansion, built a kitchen in the mansion itself, and added gas lighting. One of the Wheatons' guests wrote that they used to swim at Gracie's old mansion, where "there was comparatively deep water on the North side".

Wheaton declared bankruptcy in 1859, and the house went into foreclosure two years later, although the family was allowed to remain there. The Great Western Insurance Company, who had foreclosed on the house, resold it to Wheaton in 1870. The 1870 census describes Wheaton as living in the house with his wife, their three daughters, and two servants; by then, his affluent neighbors had moved toward the middle of Manhattan. Wheaton's daughter Alice Hermione Wheaton Quackenbush and her husband Lambert S. Quackenbush lived in the mansion for five years in the 1870s; the Quackenbushes' two oldest children, Amalie and Daniel, were also born in the mansion.

Wheaton took out several mortgages on the house and frequently encountered business troubles. His entire family may have left the house for a short time in the 1870s during one such business failure. Wheaton established a business on Broadway in 1878, but the business is not listed in an 1879 directory. In directories for subsequent years, listings for Wheaton mention only that he lived at Gracie Mansion, although he is recorded as being a "merchant" in 1882 and 1883. The house continued to be affected by Wheaton's business failures until his youngest daughter, Jane, married the lawyer Hamlin Babcock in 1884. Babcock moved into the house and remained there until 1896.

== Parks Department takeover ==
The New York City government took over the land northeast of 86th Street and East End Avenue in 1891, converting it into what would later become Carl Schurz Park. The house itself was acquired by the city in 1896 and added to Carl Schurz Park. According to Susan Danilow, who directed the Gracie Mansion Conservancy in the 2000s, the city government took over the mansion because the taxes had not been paid. The mansion served various functions as part of the park, including an ice cream stand, storage rooms, classrooms, and as a public toilet where, for five cents, people could use the house's bathrooms.

In 1911, the mansion was outfitted with steam heat; at the time, the house was being used as a clubhouse for girls' clubs. The porch began to sag, while the paint was peeling. The house was in such disrepair that local residents wanted the mansion demolished, although a group led by Mrs. Graeme Elliot advocated for its preservation.

=== Museum of the City of New York use ===
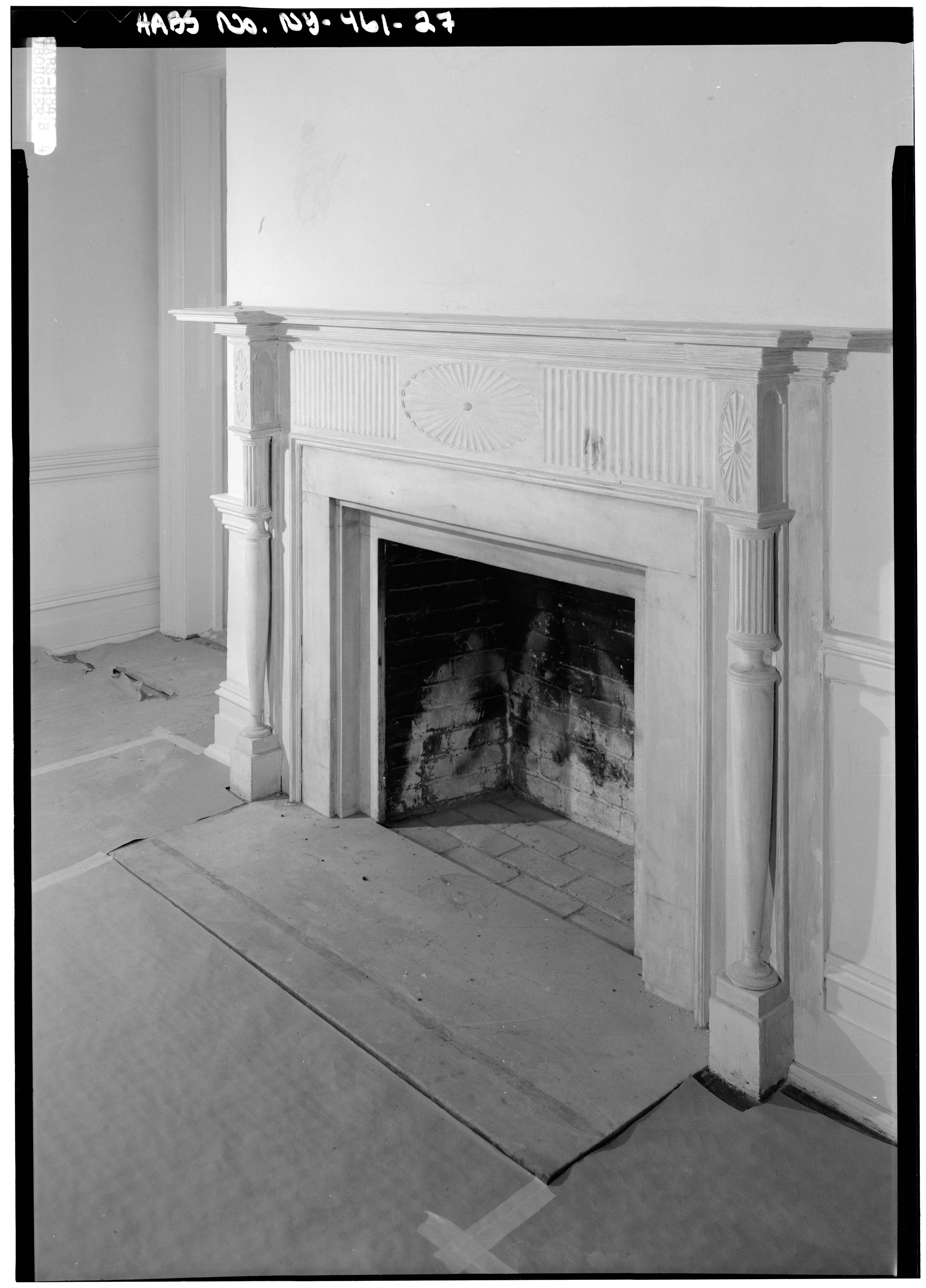
Fireplace in one room

The Patriotic New Yorkers—led by the writer May King Van Rensselaer, one of Gracie's descendants—had been contemplating taking over the mansion and opening an American history museum there in 1920. King Van Rensselaer and 20 other upper-class women wanted the museum to depict "the guests who had been entertained there, in the costumes of the beginning of 1800". The group wrote a letter to the Manhattan park commissioner in March 1922, requesting that Gracie Mansion be converted into a public museum. The next month, a bill to transfer control of the mansion to the Patriotic New Yorkers was introduced in the state legislature. At the time, the house was characterized as tan with red trimmings, and there was a piazza in front of the house. By 1923, the Museum of the City of New York (MCNY), led by Henry Collins Brown, also wanted to take over the house. Although NYC Parks had not awarded control of the house to either organization, The New York Times wrote that MCNY officials were already marking their letters as having come from Gracie Mansion.

Ultimately, the city and state governments gave the MCNY control over the mansion; the 1924 Valentine's Manual said the home "is exactly the place" for a history museum. As part of the agreement, the city government maintained the house, and the city's park commissioners were also permitted to rent it to civic groups for meetings. The MCNY furnished Gracie Mansion with objects gifted or loaned by other institutions. The MCNY opened within the mansion in November 1924 with exhibits spread across two floors. Following further restoration, Gracie Mansion formally opened to the public as the MCNY's exhibit space in March 1927, although the museum was already planning a new building. When the MCNY occupied the house, the ground floor was arranged as a reception room, music room, and dining room. Three of the second-floor rooms were open to the public: a bedroom, a theatrical history room, and a drawing room, the last of which was dedicated to May King Van Rensselaer in 1927. The New York Times wrote in the late 1920s that the house's presence "helps to sustain the old-fashioned atmosphere" of the surrounding blocks, where apartments were quickly being built.

The mansion had 130,000 visitors within a year of its rededication. After the United States Department of War set off explosives in Hell Gate to dredge it, the house's ceiling partially collapsed in June 1928, and the house was closed for repairs. The ceiling could not be repaired while blasting continued, but the secretary of war denied that the building had sustained structural damage. In 1929, the city authorized $12,000 (Note: About $177,000 in 2025) in bonds to repair the mansion and add a fence. When the MCNY's new building on Fifth Avenue was completed in 1931, the museum moved almost all staff to the new structure. The MCNY moved out of the mansion completely in August 1932, as the museum's director said that it had outgrown the house. The empty house was guarded only by a watchman, and NYC Parks had no plans for the mansion.

=== Historic house museum use ===
A renovation of the house commenced in September 1934. Park commissioner Robert Moses had hired Aymar Embury II to design a new porch and redesign the interior, in advance of the house's conversion into a historic house museum. Works Progress Administration (WPA) workers added new window sills, roof, clapboard, porch, and heating and lighting systems. None of the original furniture remained, but several organizations agreed to lend furniture to the house, and the Colonial Dames of America redecorated a room. The MCNY gave some musical instruments; the Metropolitan Museum of Art provided 10 paintings and 19 pieces of furniture, and lawyer Francis Patrick Garvan lent 61 pieces of furnishings. Central heating and electricity were also added.

The renovation was completed in April 1936. The ground floor contained a porch, hall, living room, dining room, sitting room, and curator's room, while the second floor included a child's bedroom, three master bedrooms, and a caretaker's apartment. The rooms displayed items such as paintings, four-poster beds, drawers, Chippendale chairs, a piano, and other furniture from the early 19th century. The house attracted relatively few visitors, as the only nearby public transportation was the 86th Street Crosstown Line, a trolley (and later bus) line. A reporter for the New York Herald Tribune wrote in 1940 that the house "cannot hide from modern visitors its lack of running water and adequate heat" despite the ornate decorations.

Early plans for the FDR Drive (then the East River Drive) called for a double-deck section of the parkway to be built straight through the mansion's lawn. At the urging of Manhattan borough president Stanley M. Isaacs, this segment was changed to a tunnel in 1938. The tunnel's design was intended to preserve the slope of the hill between the mansion and the waterfront, as well as the views from the mansion. Even so, the parkway effectively cut off the mansion from the waterfront. Work on a double-deck section of tunnel, which traveled within 20 yards (18 m) of Gracie Mansion, began in February 1940, and the tunnel was finished that June. During the construction of the tunnel, many of the mansion's artifacts had to be placed in storage. Members of the public suggested converting the house for other purposes, including a nightclub or a tea room.

== Use as mayor's residence ==
Robert Moses had first proposed acquiring an official New York City mayoral residence in 1935. At the time, the city's mayors typically lived in their own houses after they were elected; the only indication that a building served as a mayor's residence was a special streetlight outside the home. In 1936, Mayor Fiorello H. La Guardia rejected the idea of acquiring the Charles M. Schwab House as a mayoral residence. In June 1941, Moses received a letter offering to furnish Gracie Mansion as a historic house museum. Moses opposed this proposal and instead suggested this site as a mayoral residence to La Guardia, to which the latter eventually agreed. Moses, in a November 1941 letter to La Guardia, predicted it would cost $25,000 (Note: About $422,000 in 2025) to rebuild the mansion for the mayor.

=== Conversion and La Guardia use ===
Front of the house

A plan to convert Gracie Mansion into New York City's mayoral residence was drafted in December 1941, and the New York City Board of Estimate approved the plan unanimously the next month. This made Gracie Mansion one of a few official mayoral residences in the U.S. To convince La Guardia, Moses proposed closing the house's restrooms and evicting Carl Schurz Park's caretaker from the second floor. Henry Stern, who served as the city's park commissioner in the late 20th century, said that Moses's proposal was "a great idea, with great foresight", because it placed the mansion under the purview of the city's park department. Conversely, the Citizens Union of New York opposed the plan because it would be inconvenient for city officials and future mayors to travel there from outer boroughs. Another opponent objected to the closure of the historic house museum.

Three museums agreed to lend furnishings for the house, but the Board of Estimate would not pay $5,000 (equivalent to $99,000 in 2025) to borrow these items, although private citizens agreed to provide furnishings. Numerous companies wrote letters to the city government, offering to provide material for the house. WPA workers started renovating the mansion and surrounding grounds on January 22, 1942; although the project was supposed to last three months, it was delayed by labor and material shortages. As part of the project, a master bedroom, kitchen, servants' rooms, and offices for the park supervisor and the mayor's security detail were constructed. In addition, new electrical outlets, a driveway, and an iron fence were added. The only access to the mansion was via the driveway, which was guarded by a police booth. The renovation involved up to 300 workers at once, and the project was completed on May 21. The La Guardia family moved into the mansion on May 27, 1942, when the mayor himself was out of town. La Guardia preferred to call the residence "Gracie Farm", as he wanted to downplay the house's grandeur.

The La Guardia family lived on the second floor. La Guardia's wife Marie recalled that her husband often had appointments in the front hall, as a proper reception room would not be added for another two decades. Due to a lack of money and wartime constraints, the La Guardias rarely hosted guests at the mansion. Those they did included George II of Greece (the first monarch to meet with a mayor at the mansion), Cuban president Fulgencio Batista, Czechoslovak president Edvard Beneš, and U.S. General of the Army Dwight D. Eisenhower. After moving into Gracie Mansion, La Guardia used it as a "summer city hall". In mid-1942, there were proposals to melt down the mansion's iron fence for the World War II effort, although Moses claimed the fence had no salvage value and was essential for security. The businessman Walter Hoving claimed in 1943 that the city could save $100,000 (Note: About $1,486,000 in 2025) by giving up the mansion and the WNYC radio station, to which Moses claimed that NYC Parks was entirely responsible for the mansion's upkeep and that the city did not subsidize the mayor's residence at all. The La Guardias moved to Riverdale, Bronx, after La Guardia left office at the end of 1945.

=== 20th century ===
==== O'Dwyer and Impellitteri use ====
When William O'Dwyer was elected in 1945, he initially said he would not relocate from his Brooklyn residence. O'Dwyer reversed his previous decision after determining that the mansion offered more privacy than his own house. The mansion was repainted and refurnished, and the O'Dwyers moved into the house at the end of January 1946. To give the mayor's family more privacy, the lawn to the south and east of the mansion was expanded by 25 feet (7.6 m) in mid-1946. An elevator was installed for O'Dwyer's wife Kitty, who had Parkinson's disease, although she did not use the elevator, instead staying on the upper stories with her nurses and housekeeper. Kitty O'Dwyer died less than a year after moving in. The O'Dwyers' official guests included Mexican president Miguel Alemán Valdés (the first head of state to attend an official function there) and U.S. president Harry S. Truman. After O'Dwyer remarried Elizabeth Sloan Simpson in late 1949, Sloan Simpson indicated that she did not intend to renovate the house. O'Dwyer and his wife left the mansion after he resigned in August 1950 to become the U.S. ambassador to Mexico.

New York City Council president Vincent R. Impellitteri became the city's acting mayor at the beginning of September 1950, and he and his wife Betty moved in shortly after. Betty Impellitteri said she would not redecorate or refurnish the house; the family also kept their old apartment on 16th Street. Even though Impellitteri had been appointed to a four-month term and could not live in the mansion if he lost that year's special mayoral election, he decided to use the mansion to receive official visitors. Over the next several years, few people were invited to the house. Impellitteri, who would serve as mayor until 1953, recalled that he did not host any guests overnight, and a New Yorker columnist said that the mansion's gates were often closed and that the lights were frequently off. During Impellitteri's tenure, an Israeli artist's oil painting and a portrait of his wife were added to the mansion.

==== Wagner use, development of annex ====
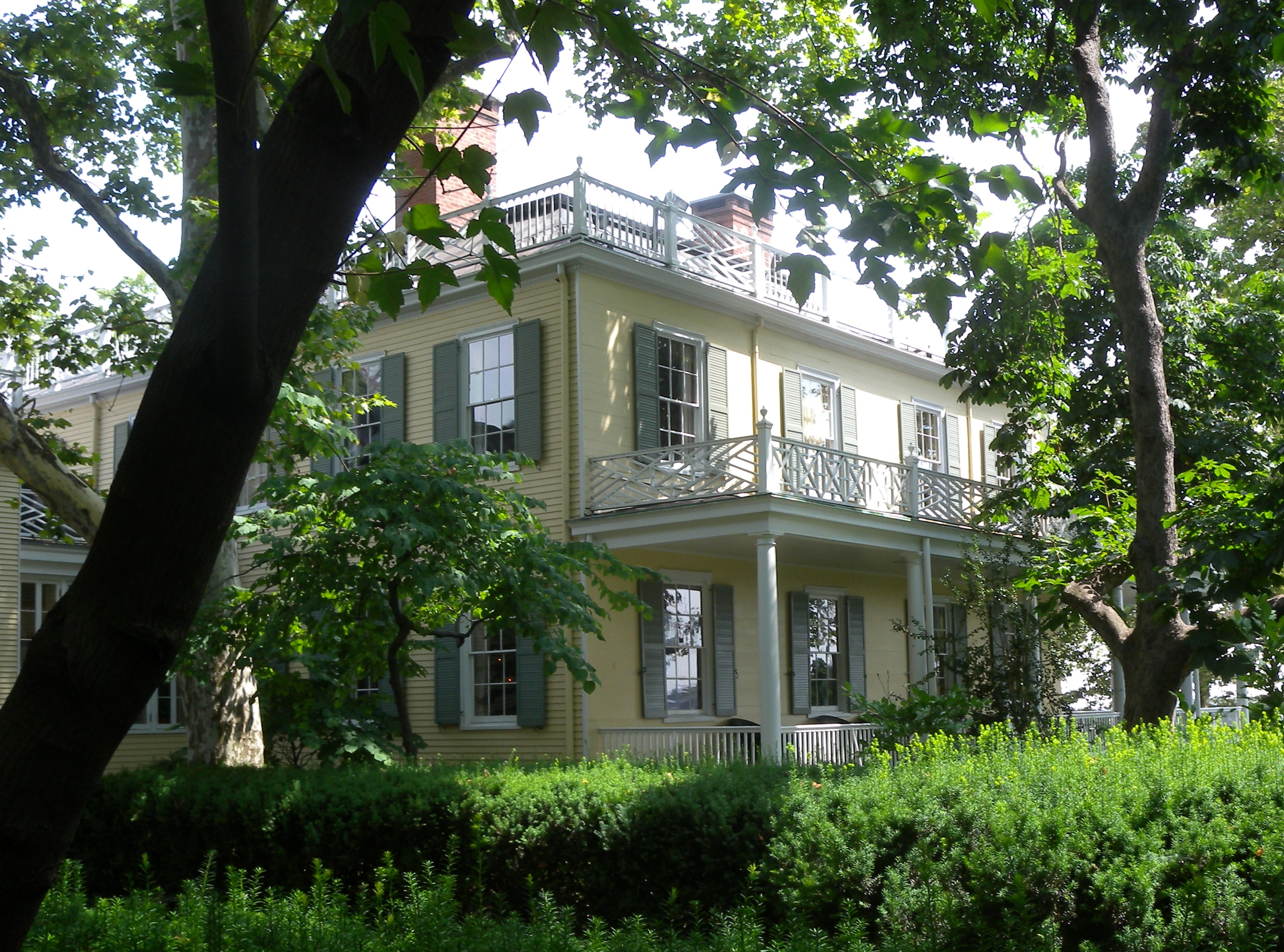
Looking north from the house's southern corner

Robert F. Wagner Jr. was elected in 1953, and he and his family moved into the house at the end of January 1954 from their nearby apartment on 86th Street. The facade was repainted, and some of the interior rooms were refurnished; several pieces of art and furniture were placed into storage. Other artifacts, including paintings, tables, and chests, remained in place. The mayor's wife Susan asked city workers to seal up the elevators so their young sons, Duncan and Bob, would not play with them. The Wagners added wallpaper and draperies to the rooms, and they added three portraits of women to the living room. Five staff members were employed at the house. In the summer, the Wagner family spent time at their summer home in Islip, New York. The Wagner sons rode bicycles around Gracie Mansion in the spring and fall, and NYC Parks employees put up Christmas trees in the house during the holiday season. A portrait of Susan, by Willy Pogany, was added to the house in 1955. The house's kitchen was upgraded in 1957 with cabinets, an oven, a refrigerator, and other appliances. Over the years, visiting world leaders donated other objects for the mansion.

In contrast to their predecessors, the Wagners hosted many guests at the mansion. Susan Wagner hosted an average of four events a week at the mansion, starting with her first press conference in March 1954. Almost all rooms at Gracie Mansion were open to visitors, and charitable organizations hosted teas at the house, except when the Wagner sons were on vacation from school. Other guests during Wagner's tenure included U.S. presidents Truman and John F. Kennedy, as well as Congress members, governors, visiting mayors, and foreign politicians. Duncan and Bob often explored the mansion and, as they grew older, participated in events there. Susan estimated that she was hosting at least 125 events at the mansion annually by 1957. By the late 1950s, the mansion averaged 600 weekly visitors, and official city meetings sometimes encroached into the mansion's living space, forcing Susan to go inside a closet to change clothes. The mansion's food costs averaged $2,000 a month by 1960; (Note: About $21,766 in 2025 (Note: 1634–1699: McCusker, J. J. (1997). How Much Is That in Real Money? A Historical Price Index for Use as a Deflator of Money Values in the Economy of the United States: Addenda et Corrigenda (PDF). American Antiquarian Society. 1700–1799: McCusker, J. J. (1992). How Much Is That in Real Money? A Historical Price Index for Use as a Deflator of Money Values in the Economy of the United States (PDF). American Antiquarian Society. 1800–present: Federal Reserve Bank of Minneapolis. "Consumer Price Index (estimate) 1800–".)) this prompted NYC Parks commissioner Newbold Morris to reduce the mansion's food budget to $14 a day. (Note: About $152 in 2025) One of Wagner's opponents in the 1961 New York City mayoral election claimed that the Wagners were illegally overspending at the mansion, while another opponent vowed to turn it into a museum.

The Committee to Preserve Gracie Mansion as New York's White House, formed in 1963, sought to raise $250,000 (Note: About $2,012,000 in 2025) to expand and renovate Gracie Mansion. Susan Wagner, who said she had long pursued a renovation of the mansion, hired Edward Embry to design a northern expansion. The plans were delayed when Susan fell ill from cancer; she died in March 1964. The Committee for Gracie Mansion, which was incorporated that May, announced that the house's expansion would be named in her memory. The committee and the city government signed an agreement the next month, allowing the committee to raise funds. The architect Mott B. Schmidt prepared plans for a new west wing. The revised plan, announced in January 1965, was originally planned to cost $700,000 (Note: About $5,449,000 in 2025) and be privately financed. The wing was to be used for meetings and receptions.

Groundbreaking for the wing took place in May 1965, and the city's Art Commission approved plans for the annex the next month. Jeannette Becker Lenygon, who had helped redecorate the Blair House and White House, was hired to select furnishings. Wagner was remarried to Barbara Cavanagh in July 1965. The family moved out of the mansion that September; Cavanagh had never moved in, as Wagner was to leave office at the end of the year. For the rest of his term, Wagner used the house only for official events. By that October, the annex was to cost $800,000, of which about $660,000 had been raised. (Note: The total cost is equivalent to $6,227,000, of which $5,137,000 had been raised, in 2025.)

==== Lindsay and Beame use ====
When John Lindsay was elected as mayor in November 1965, he offered to pay to repaint the original mansion; Morris said that NYC Parks would pay for repainting. In either case, the annex was not complete at the end of the year, and the house could not be repainted until the annex was finished. The Lindsay family temporarily lived at the Roosevelt Hotel during early 1966; his wife Mary wanted to fire some of the mansion's staff and expressed an intention to help workers fix up the house. The family, with their four children, moved to Gracie Mansion in mid-March, ten weeks after Lindsay took office. The interior spaces were again redecorated in advance of the family's move, and some broken furnishings were repaired. The city government spent $20,000 (Note: About $151,000 in 2025) to install sprinklers after city officials declared that the house was a fire hazard. Lindsay directed city officials to build a helipad near the mansion that May, as the mansion's lawn was too windy to land on. A wooden stockade fence was installed behind the house's wrought-iron fence in June. Mary Lindsay did not wish to host public events in the main mansion, aside from meetings that she organized herself, as she wished to confine all other events to the new annex.

The expansion, which ultimately cost $800,000, (Note: About $6,055,000 in 2025) was dedicated on September 27, 1966. A garden with tall hedges had been planted next to the annex by 1967, further screening the mayor's family from passersby. That year, NYC Parks banned active recreational activities next to the house, and the original furnaces were replaced. The attic served as a playroom, and NYC Parks workers built a treehouse for the Lindsays' children. Mary Lindsay told media outlets in the late 1960s that she regarded the smooth operation of the mansion and household as being among her primary duties as the city's first lady. During the first four years of her husband's eight-year tenure as mayor, she oversaw the redecoration of the mansion's interior spaces. Despite the large number of official functions that took place at Gracie Mansion, the mayor's family was still able to use it for "real, homely" life, as The Christian Science Monitor described it; the family kept several pets at the mansion, such as dogs, gerbils, and birds. Guests such as Constantine II of Greece, Harold Arlen, Johnny Carson, Charlie and Oona Chaplin, and Robert Redford visited the mansion during the Lindsays' time there.

After Abraham Beame was elected to succeed Lindsay in 1973, the house was renovated in January 1974 with a $40,000 (Note: About $203,000 in 2025) allocation from the city. The Beames' friend Joan Haber, an interior designer, helped redecorate the house. One of the Lindsays' bedrooms was converted into a sitting room, while another became a study. Two other bedrooms were used by the Beames' grandchildren during their visits to the mansion. During the first several weeks of his term, Beame continued to live at his house in Belle Harbor, Queens, and he and his wife Mary moved into Gracie Mansion at the end of February. During the Beames' occupancy, the mansion hosted guests such as Japanese emperor Hirohito and actress Gloria Swanson, and it also held events such as a United States Bicentennial celebration. After Ed Koch defeated Beame in 1977, the Beames bought an apartment nearby. Mary Beame asked if they could stay in the house briefly after Koch was inaugurated on January 1, 1978, but Abraham Beame chose to move out just before Koch's inauguration.

==== Koch use and expansion ====
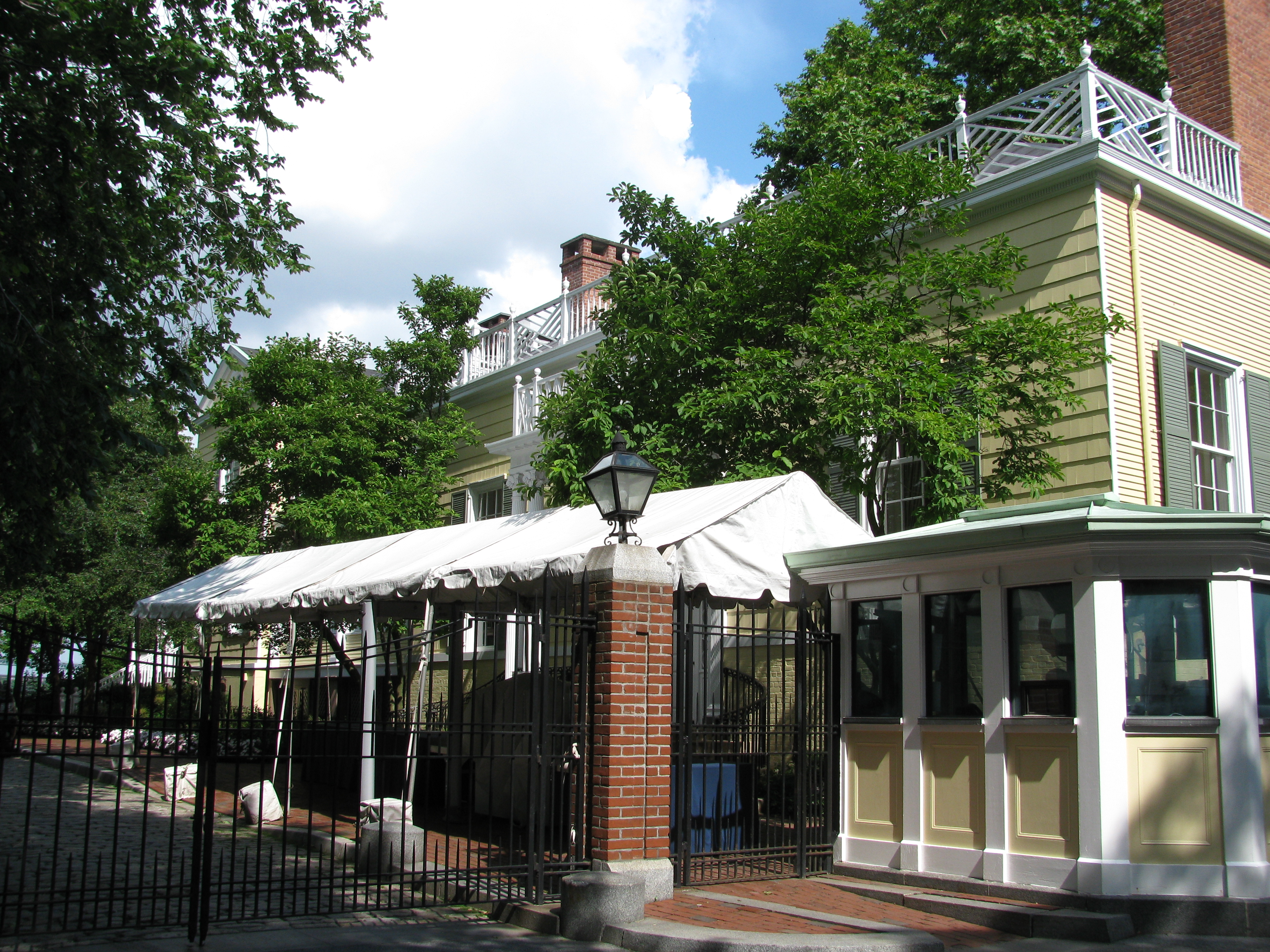
Security guard's station in front of the house

When Koch began moving into the mansion at the end of 1977, he ordered new furniture and brought some clothes from his Greenwich Village apartment. Koch originally preferred to stay at his apartment on weekends, saying the mansion was "nice, but it's like a hotel". He decided to live at Gracie Mansion full-time only after he attended a family dinner there. Koch did not replace the furnishings, though he did add some of his own decor, such as a wooden rabbit sculpture named Pee Wee. Several paintings were added to the mansion during Koch's first few years, including contemporary art from the Met and from modern art galleries, as well as ten 20th-century paintings lent by New York University. These works of art were added at the urging of New York City cultural affairs commissioner Henry Geldzahler. In addition, when the New York state government began conducting a renewable-energy study in 1979, Koch invited the state government to install equipment at the mansion. The state government dismissed the offer because it was not cost-efficient.

Koch was the first unmarried mayor to move into the mansion; his assistant Dorothy Aschkenasy acted as the city's unofficial first lady, overseeing the mansion's other staff and ensuring the house was in good shape. Three or four times a week, Koch hosted events for guests ranging from civic and ethnic associations to visiting politicians. Whereas his predecessors' families typically ate at the mansion alone or with a small number of guests, Koch regularly invited dozens of people for breakfast and dinner. For example, Israeli prime minister Menachem Begin stayed at the mansion for a few days in 1978. Koch also hosted other visitors including U.S. president Ronald Reagan, Archbishop of New York John O'Connor, Catholic saint Mother Teresa, and filmmaker Woody Allen. These events required that a chef live in the mansion around the clock; Koch, who was a picky eater, went through four chefs in four years. Koch began giving tours of the house to the general public in September 1980; the tours attracted up to 20,000 people annually. During the late 1970s and early 1980s, the city converted Gracie Mansion's attic into an apartment for Koch's chef. (Note: Sources disagree on whether the attic apartment cost $45,000, $67,000, or nearly $72,000. The price range is equivalent to between $135,000 and $216,000 in 2025.) The rest of the mansion needed upgrades as well; the main house and reception area were linked only by a kitchen, and the offices in the basement were too small.

Koch announced a renovation of the mansion in 1981 and formed the Gracie Mansion Conservancy the next year to oversee renovations of the mansion. Koch convinced Joan K. Davidson to serve as the conservancy's first chairperson. Charles A. Platt was named the coordinating architect, Albert Hadley and Mark Hampton were hired as interior decorators, and Dianne Pilgrim and David McFadden were employed as the curators. Hadley resigned from the project due to disagreements and was replaced by Marilynn Johnson, a Metropolitan Museum of Art curator. Work on the project began in March 1983 with the replacement of the porch. The project included new furnishings, landscaping, a new porch, expanded staff rooms, HVAC and electrical upgrades, as well as a gourmet kitchen. Workers upgraded the mansion while restoring it to as close to its original design as possible; they used dozens of paint and wallpaper samples to restore the original appearance. Numerous designers were hired to decorate the interiors. The renovation also included archeological excavations, as well as the refurbishment of paths and parking spots.

The renovation was finished in November 1984. The renovation had cost $5.5 million; the city government had provided $1 million, while the remainder had been raised privately. (Note: The total cost was about $14,401,000, of which the city raised $2,618,000, in 2025.) Over the next year, Koch hosted over 23,000 guests at the mansion, more than he had invited in any other year. Koch also hired the horticulturalist Maureen Hackett to restore and maintain the grounds in 1987. After Koch suffered a stroke the same year, he had a temporary office in Gracie Mansion while he recovered. Gracie Mansion was one of the founding members of the Historic House Trust, established at the mansion in 1989. Koch moved to an apartment on Fifth Avenue after losing reelection later that year. By then, the house hosted 22,000 guests annually. The city's commissioner of investigation released a report in 1991, finding that Gracie Mansion had not had an official budget for at least a decade. The report found that there had been several "wasteful projects" at the mansion during Koch's tenure, including $53,000 of work on a kitchen barbecue (Note: About $112,000 in 2025) and thousands of dollars' worth of custom-made equipment.

==== Dinkins and Giuliani use ====
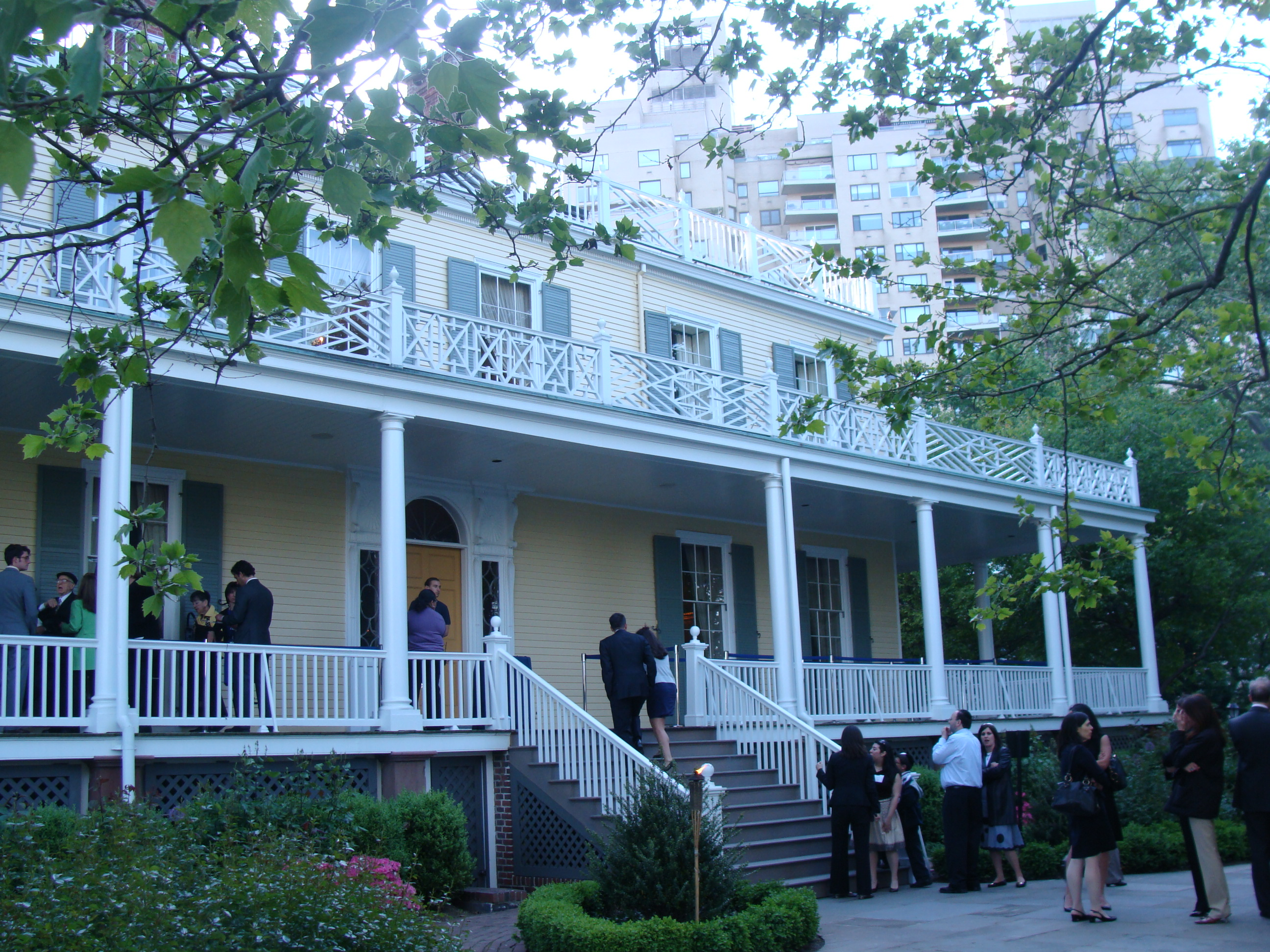
The mansion's porch

When David Dinkins won the 1989 New York City mayoral election, his wife Joyce Dinkins indicated that she would not change the decor, as Koch had already renovated the mansion extensively. The Dinkinses did contemplate adding a swing set and other features for their grandchildren. The Dinkins family relocated to the mansion in mid-January 1990, after they redecorated the interior and moved some furniture. Joyce Dinkins read to first-grade students at the mansion once a week, and the Dinkinses hosted "Kids Day at Gracie Mansion" every summer. The Dinkinses' highest-profile guest at the mansion was the future South African president Nelson Mandela. During Dinkins's mayoralty, there was controversy over a $11,500 headboard that Dinkins had ordered for the mansion; (Note: About $25,000 in 2025) he and his allies eventually agreed to reimburse the city and the Gracie Mansion Conservancy for the cost of the headboard. City inspectors discovered high lead levels in the mansion's water supply in 1992.

After Rudy Giuliani defeated Dinkins in 1993, the house's curator was suspended after inappropriately firing two of the house's staff. Giuliani, his wife Donna Hanover, and their young children Andrew and Caroline moved into the mansion at the beginning of 1994. Despite the large number of events that the Giulianis hosted at the mansion, they still wanted their children to live regular lives there. Hanover became the chairwoman of the Gracie Mansion Conservancy and had a four-employee office at the mansion. As chairwoman, Hanover raised around a million dollars for the house's upkeep, including over $400,000 in 1994 alone. (Note: About $787,000 in 2025) The New York City Police Department considered replacing the mansion's security system at the end of 1994, and police commissioner William Bratton spent $150,000 the next year on a new security system. (Note: About $289,000 in 2025) In addition, the chimneys and other furnishings were repaired; the mansion was repainted; and Tiffany & Co. gifted china to the mansion. Because of the house's small size, the Giulianis hosted few overnight guests, limiting stays to close friends and family. During the late 1990s, there were still public tours of the mansion, which displayed 700 antique items.

When Giuliani and Hanover separated in 2001, Hanover sued to prevent Giuliani's girlfriend Judith Nathan from moving into the mansion. The lawsuit mainly concerned whether the mansion should be considered a private residence rather than a private space. A judge ruled in Hanover's favor, saying the family's children had a right to move around the house without being interrupted by visitors. By then, Giuliani privately noted that the mansion's interiors were starting to decay, while other observers such as Ed Koch said that the exterior was also rundown. Hanover said the conservancy was restoring the windows, roof railings, and carpets, but that the next mayor would be responsible for repainting the house. The mansion also had several rat infestations. Hanover refused to vacate the mansion, so Giuliani had moved out by July 2001, months before he was to leave office. The New York Supreme Court, Appellate Division, upheld Nathan's ban from the mansion that October.

=== 21st century ===
==== Bloomberg tenure ====
When Michael Bloomberg was elected in 2001, his mayoral transition team began discussing a renovation of the mansion. Bloomberg's partner Diana Taylor wanted them to live there, but he refused, saying it would be a large, unjustified expense for taxpayers. Furthermore, Bloomberg already had a residence on the Upper East Side. The exterior was repainted in April 2002 with $85,000 from an anonymous donor, (Note: About $145,000 in 2025) who may have been Bloomberg himself. A major restoration of the mansion began that May. The renovation was designed by Bloomberg's personal decorator Jamie Drake and involved replacing mechanical systems, reinforcing the internal structure, and repainting and restoring historical elements. Bloomberg borrowed sculptures from the Museum of Modern Art to decorate the lawn, and Tiffany & Co. donated more china. The mayor's living spaces and the Wagner wing were to be renovated as well. The project was completed in October 2002 for $7 million, which included $700,000 for the installation of fixtures. (Note: The total cost was about $3,417,000 for the whole project and $1,196,000 for fixtures in 2025.) The renovation had been largely funded with $5.5 million in private donations. (Note: About $9,396,000 in 2025)

Under Bloomberg's tenure as mayor, the house was open to the public on Tuesdays, and visitors were permitted to see the upstairs rooms. Bloomberg used the mansion as an overnight accommodation for official visitors. The mansion hosted 178 events in 2003, the first full year after the renovation, with events including receptions and holiday parties. The Gracie Mansion Conservancy received $1 million in donations from January to September 2003 (an increase from $42,200 in all of 2001), and the house itself saw 23,000 visitors during 2003. The house hosted events as well. Under Bloomberg's mayoralty, the house hosted such overnight guests as Miami mayor Manuel A. Diaz, South African archbishop Desmond Tutu, and Norwegian Crown Prince Haakon. Gracie Mansion continued to be known colloquially as the "mayor's house", and it retained a full-time staff of 12.

By 2011, annual visitation had increased to 40,000. A Daily News investigation that year found that 16 active violations of city building codes had been recorded at the house, including a crumbling wall. A renovation of the kitchen began in June 2012 and was completed the next year for $1.25 million. Bloomberg, who served as mayor until 2013, never lived in the house, and he recommended that his successors not live in the house. Toward the end of Bloomberg's term, the mansion was cleaned and repaired for his successor.

==== De Blasio, Adams, and Mamdani use ====
Major candidates in the 2013 election indicated that they wished to live in Gracie Mansion. The winner, Bill de Blasio, delayed moving into the mansion until the end of the 2013–2014 academic year, as his son Dante was attending Brooklyn Technical High School. De Blasio's family began moving in during June 2014; it took almost two months. The de Blasio family furnished the second-floor living space with about $65,000 or $70,000 of furniture donated by West Elm. Another $80,000 went toward security, cleaning, maintenance, and relocation of belongings. The first floor was used for official events and city business, and the de Blasio family hosted parties as well. At the NYPD's request, a tall fence was installed around the mansion in 2014 to protect de Blasio's family. The de Blasio administration estimated that it would host over 50 events a year at the mansion, and the mansion hosted exhibits during de Blasio's mayoralty. By 2015, the roof was leaking and needed to undergo asbestos abatement.

Eric Adams and his family lived in Gracie Mansion after he won the 2021 election. Following his victory, Adams implied that he might split his time between Gracie Mansion and his home in Brooklyn, then said that he would bring only his mattress to the mansion without redecorating it. The house continued to be rented out for events such as weddings. Adams reportedly did not want to live in the mansion, claiming it was haunted. Federal agents searched the mansion in 2024 when Adams was indicted on federal charges. A man scaled the mansion's fence early on January 1, 2025, and stole several items while Adams was away.

After Zohran Mamdani won the 2025 election, he announced that his family would move there. Mamdani and his wife Rama Duwaji moved to the mansion in mid-January 2026, and he announced plans for several modifications, including bidets in the bathrooms. Mamdani funded the bidets with his own money.

== Architecture ==
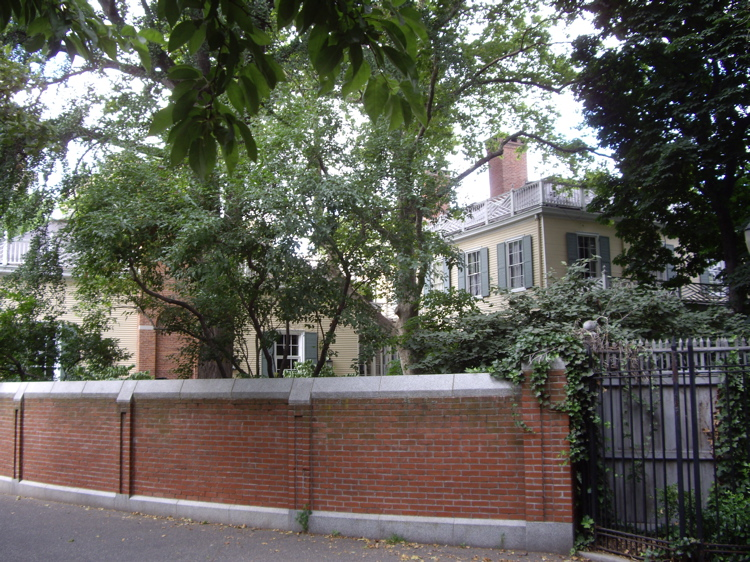
Western side

Archibald Gracie built the two-story wooden house in the Federal style. The design of the structure has been variously attributed to Pierre Charles L'Enfant, the French engineer responsible for the L'Enfant Plan in Washington, D.C.; Ezra Weeks, a prominent builder; or John McComb Jr., who had designed Hamilton Grange and New York City Hall. A 1959 news article described the house as originally measuring 50 by 65 feet (15 by 20 m) across. Ellen Stern wrote that "calling this clapboard country house a mansion—rather than a manor house or villa—might seem an urban affectation when applied to so quaint a dwelling", but that its early occupants definitely considered it a mansion.

There is a separate two-story wing next to the mansion, designed by Mott B. Schmidt; the wing is designed in a neo-Georgian style and has its own entrance. The new wing is known as the Susan B. Wagner Wing.

=== Facade ===
The original mansion's facade initially consisted of cream-colored clapboard panels and white trim, and there were green shutters flanking each window. Repainted several times over the years, the siding was painted ocher in 2002, and the trim and shutters were repainted in their original colors. The windows on the first and second floors are stacked atop each other in a manner that appears symmetrical. The eastern and western elevations of the facade are slightly asymmetrical because the house was expanded to the north in 1811. In addition, part of the basement is visible due to the slope of the site.

There is a porch around the southern and eastern elevations and on part of the northern elevation. The original porch around the mansion had a Chinese Chippendale–style balustrade; the current porch dates to 1984 and is of largely similar design. The balustrade is interspersed with Tuscan-style columns. On the eastern facade, the porch is accessed by a short stoop with two tall windows on either side. As built, the main doorway is divided into six panels and is topped by a fanlight and flanked by sidelights. The semicircular fanlight is decorated with rosettes, while the sidelights are separated by pilasters. The doorway, attributed to L'Enfant, was originally on the north or south elevation but was placed on the east side of the house by 1811. The top of the main roof is surmounted by a Chinese Chippendale–style balustrade. There are four chimneys on the roof: two larger chimneys above the original 1799 structure and two smaller ones above the 1811 expansion.

The original house's southern elevation is placed behind the porch and contains four windows on each story. There is a narrow gap between the original house and the wing to the southwest. The western elevation of the original house was built with four windows on either story, but one of the first-story windows was replaced with a connection to the wing. On the northern elevation, the original house is designed symmetrically around a protruding central bay with rectangular windows on the first and second floors and a lunette window at the attic. The section of the porch to the left (east) of this bay is open-air, while the section of the porch to the right (west) is enclosed with glass. The northern elevation of the wing has its own entrance from the mansion's driveway and has a clapboard facade. The entrance has a portico with hand-carved columns, which was based on a similar portico designed for the Tichnor family in Boston. Except for the portico columns, which are designed in the composite order, the wing largely duplicates the design details of the original house.

=== Interior ===
==== Main house ====
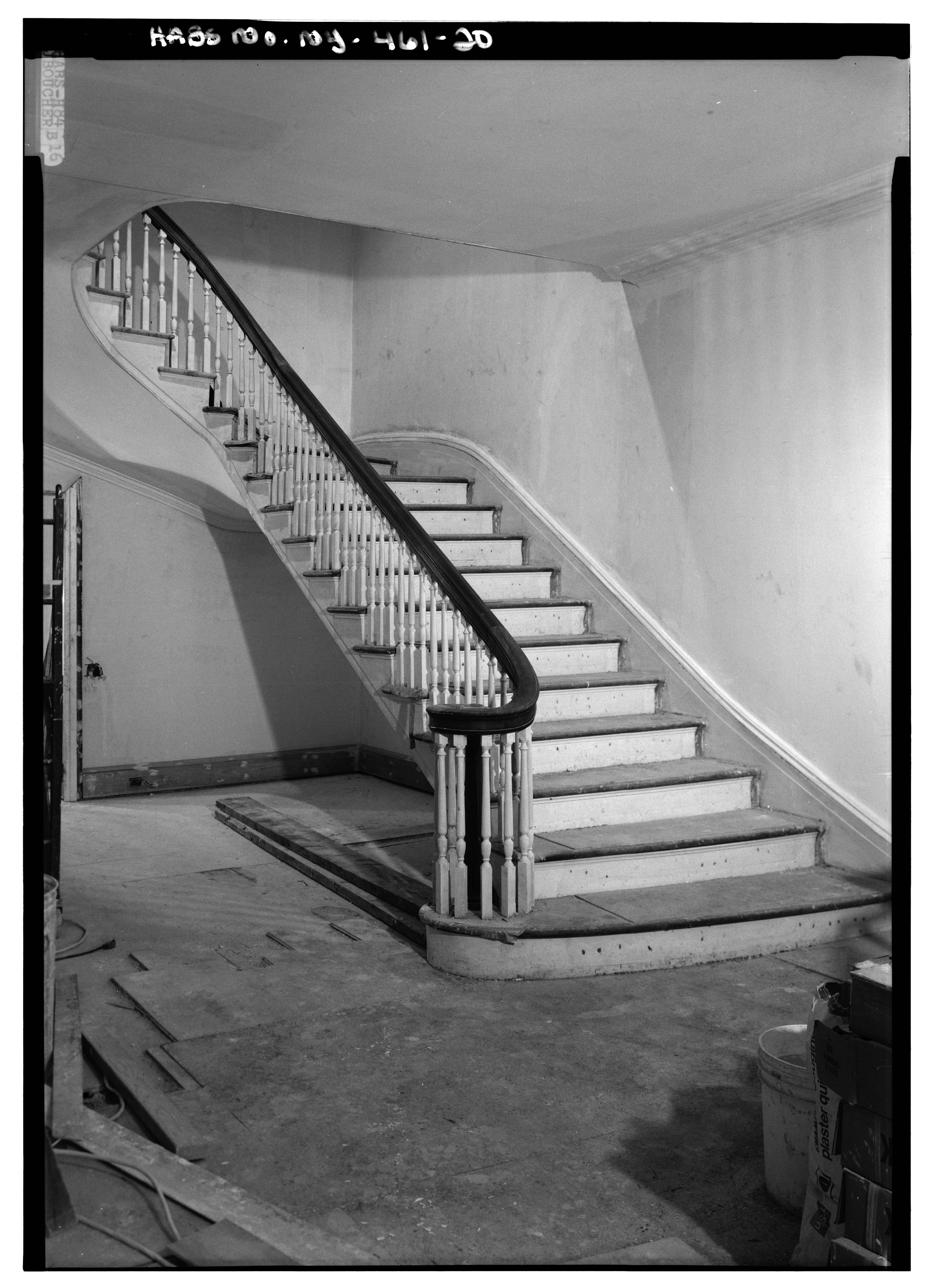
Main stair hall

The rooms of the main house retain the same layout as in 1811, although the designs of each room have been changed over the years. Before 1942, the house was used as a museum and had a restroom in the basement, a museum curator's office on the first floor, and a park supervisor's apartment on the second floor. Following the 1980s renovation, the mansion was redecorated with 19th-century chandeliers, mirrors, and other artifacts. The mansion includes around 14 rooms and eight bathrooms. In general, the rooms have wall dados, fireplaces, plain cornices, and high ceilings. The fireplaces in the house largely have classical designs with a mantelpiece shelf supported by tapering vertical pilasters.

===== First floor =====
As built, an entrance hall ran through the original house's first floor from north to south, flanked by two rooms on either side. A parlor and pantry were added to the north in an 1811 renovation. When the mansion was converted into the mayor's residence in 1942, the present-day living room, library, and dining room were preserved, and a new pantry, dining room, and kitchen were built on the first floor. Over the years, all of these rooms have had several different names.

There is a foyer with a black-and-white trompe-l'œil pattern on the floor, which in turn surrounds a compass rose. This foyer, designed by Stephen Gemberling, dates to an 1980s renovation and is based on the original design of the foyer's floor. Although the trompe-l'œil pattern was reportedly cheaper than importing real marble, Koch claimed it would have been cheaper to just install real marble. The foyer also has a fireplace with decorations that resemble those at the main entrance. A Sheraton settee was installed in the foyer during the renovation.

To the right of the main foyer is the parlor, also known as the living room or drawing room, with a large marble fireplace. The parlor, added during the expansion of 1811, has full-height windows that face the house's porch. Compared with the other rooms in the mansion, the drawing room has deeper windows; its marble fireplace mantel is decorated with plain columns and a linear relief pattern. There are also a service door to the north and windows to the east.

To the left of the foyer, at the rear of the house, is a dining room that seats 22 people. After the 1980s renovation, it included a French Empire sideboard made in the U.S. and 1830s French wallpaper that depicted rustic and classical scenes. The wallpaper was salvaged from a house in Albany, New York. There is also a fireplace that is placed off-center along one wall. The dining table itself, made in 1815 for the Gracies, is constructed of marble and oak wood. The library—also known as the small parlor, study, and sitting roomis next to the dining room and in front of it. The library's windows include etchings of the names of Gracie's granddaughter Millie; John Lindsay's daughter Margi; Caroline Giuliani; and Donna Hanover. Bloomberg's daughters Georgina and Emma also etched their names into the window. Both the library and the dining room date from the house's 1799 completion.

===== Other floors =====
A curving staircase, at the rear of the house, leads from the first floor to the second. As built, the second floor had three bedrooms accessed by a central hallway, as well as two smaller rooms that were probably used for storage. The second floor was refitted with four bedrooms (each with a private bathroom), as well as a sitting room, in 1942. One of the bedrooms is a guest bedroom, while the others are used by the mayor's family. The master bedroom and the adjacent sitting room occupy the former site of the park supervisor's apartment. When Koch was mayor, a secure bunker was installed in the bathroom adjoining the mayor's bedroom. As of 2025, the second floor has five bedrooms.

The basement originally contained the kitchen and may have also included staff quarters. The 1942 renovation added four servants' rooms, an office for the park's caretaker, and an office for the mayor's bodyguards to the basement. There is a gift shop in the basement.

==== Annex ====
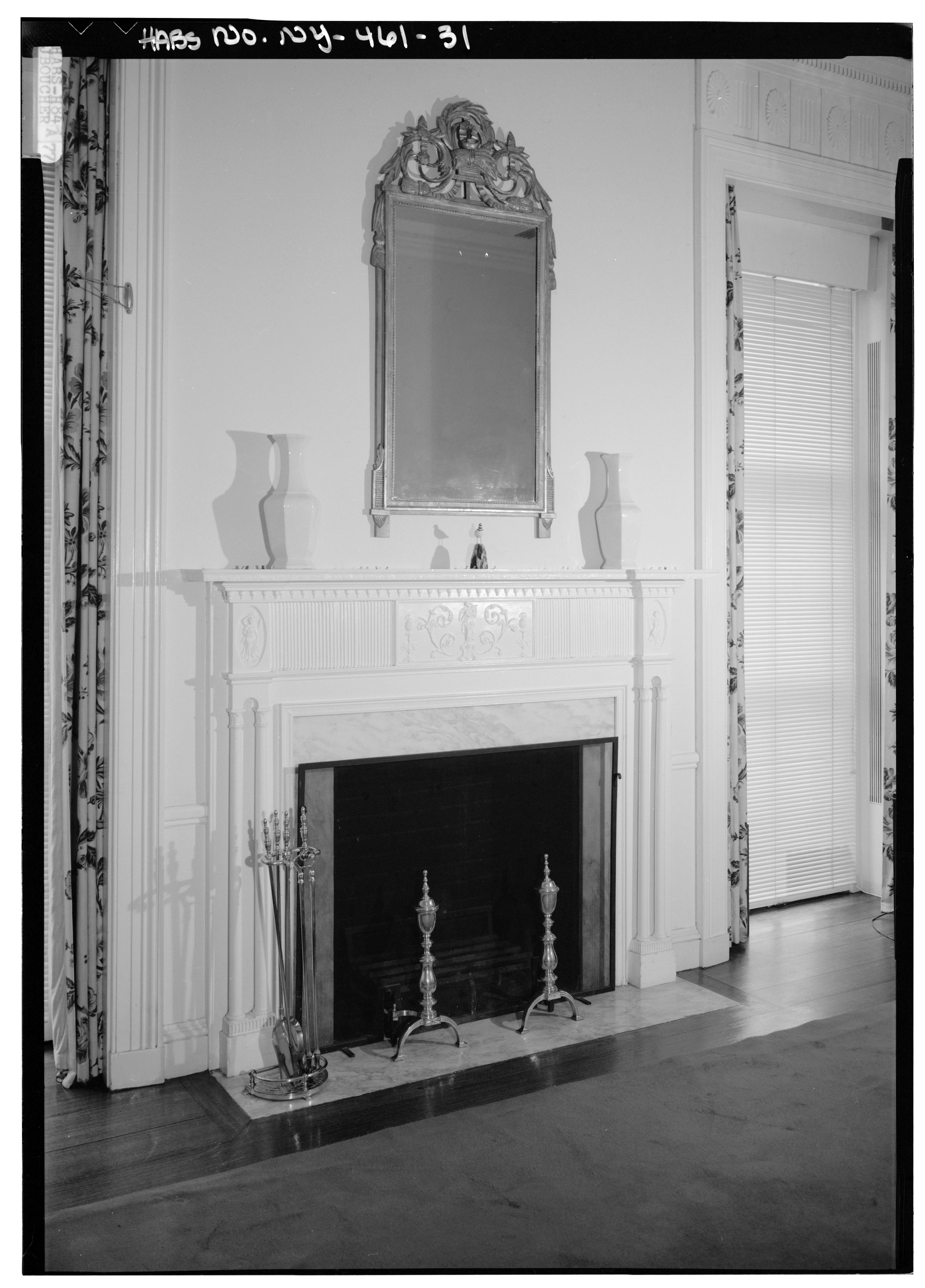
Interior of Wagner wing

When the Wagner wing was built, it nearly doubled the mansion's size. The annex could seat up to 150 people at once. An open terrace, extending off the wing, could fit another 150 guests. The Wagner wing has a Federal-style mirror, as well as four fireplace mantels and hearths, salvaged from other 18th-century houses in the city. Various pieces of antique furniture were loaned, donated, or purchased for the Wagner wing, including an 1820s Duncan Phyfe table built for Joseph Bonaparte. Although the annex was finished in 1966, it was not connected to the main house for over two decades, as Susan Wagner had wanted the two structures to be separate. A hall, sometimes known as the hyphen, was constructed between the main house and annex in the 1980s, requiring the relocation of the mansion's original main stairway.

The wing is accessed by a hallway with a marble floor and a 17.25-foot-high (5.26 m) ceiling. Inside the main level of the wing is a ballroom (originally known as the Susan Edwards Wagner Ballroom), the design of which is based on that of the Lyman Estate in Waltham, Massachusetts. Gracie Mansion's ballroom measures either 48 ft × 25 ft (14.6 m × 7.6 m) or 50 ft × 24 ft (15.2 m × 7.3 m) across and has a coved ceiling measuring 18 feet (5.5 m) high. The walls of the ballroom were originally decorated with French windows and gray-blue walls, topped by a frieze with garlands and fruit bowls. There are also 12 neoclassical columns throughout the ballroom. A chandelier from 1783 hangs from the ceiling, and eight lighting sconces are mounted onto the walls. A portrait of Susan Wagner, painted by Willy Pogany, was also displayed in the ballroom. The ballroom's Adam style mantel was salvaged from the James Watson House, the residence of Archibald Gracie's brother-in-law Moses Rogers.

Flanking the ballroom are two smaller rooms: a dining room and a reception room. There is also a serving pantry on the ballroom level. The dining room's mantel was salvaged from a house on Greenwich Street. Mark Hampton redecorated the ballroom, dining room, and reception room in the Federal style during the 1980s. The basement was constructed with a conference room, an office for the mayor, and another office for the mayor's secretary. The conference room was designed to fit at least 30 people, and press offices also occupied the basement.

== Operation ==
The mansion has served as the official New York City mayor's residence since 1942. Visiting official guests may also sleep at the house, and numerous mayors have invited their political allies to the mansion. The house has also been used for ceremonies and governmental business.

Gracie Mansion remained valuable into the early 21st century. A real-estate expert estimated in 2008 that the house could be auctioned for $250 million, and Vanity Fair magazine wrote in 2014 that the house and site were worth an estimated $125 million to $200 million. The New York Times reported in the late 1970s that the mansion also increased the value of mayors' pensions even after they retired. For instance, although Abraham Beame earned $60,000 a year just before he left office in 1977, he also received a $30,000 benefit from using the mansion, making his total pension $90,000 a year. Due to its role, the mansion has sometimes been described as the "People's House" or New York City's "Little White House".

=== Maintenance ===
The New York City Department of Parks and Recreation has owned the house since before it became a mayoral residence. The mansion's upkeep is partially overseen by the Gracie Mansion Conservancy, a public–private partnership formed in 1981 under Ed Koch's mayoralty. The conservancy was originally established to restore the mansion and preserve it. By the 1990s, the conservancy also employed a curator and assistant curator for the mansion. The Gracie Mansion Conservancy oversees educational programs and events at the mansion. In 2012, it was recorded as having a $1.7 million annual operating budget, most of which was paid by the city. The house is a member of the Historic House Trust.

=== Public access ===
Although the mansion was closed for public tours between 1942 and 1980, it has often been open to the public since then, even when in use as a mayoral residence. As of 2024, the Gracie Mansion Conservancy provides tours of the mansion one day a week; the tours cover the first floor. The de Blasio family suspended tours of the house between 2014 and 2016. Visitors were banned from taking photographs except in the Wagner Ballroom. The public has also been invited to the mansion for special occasions such as annual trick-or-treating events.

Besides official business, Gracie Mansion has hosted other types of events over the years. Its first fashion show took place in 1956. The mansion also has hosted exhibitions during its time as a mayoral residence. This included a 2015 exhibit of artifacts relating to minority groups; a 2017 exhibit with World War II–era artifacts; a 2019 exhibit of women's paintings; and a 2020 exhibit on social justice. The mansion has also been used as a meeting place for clubs such as the Gracie Book Club.

== Impact ==
=== Reception ===
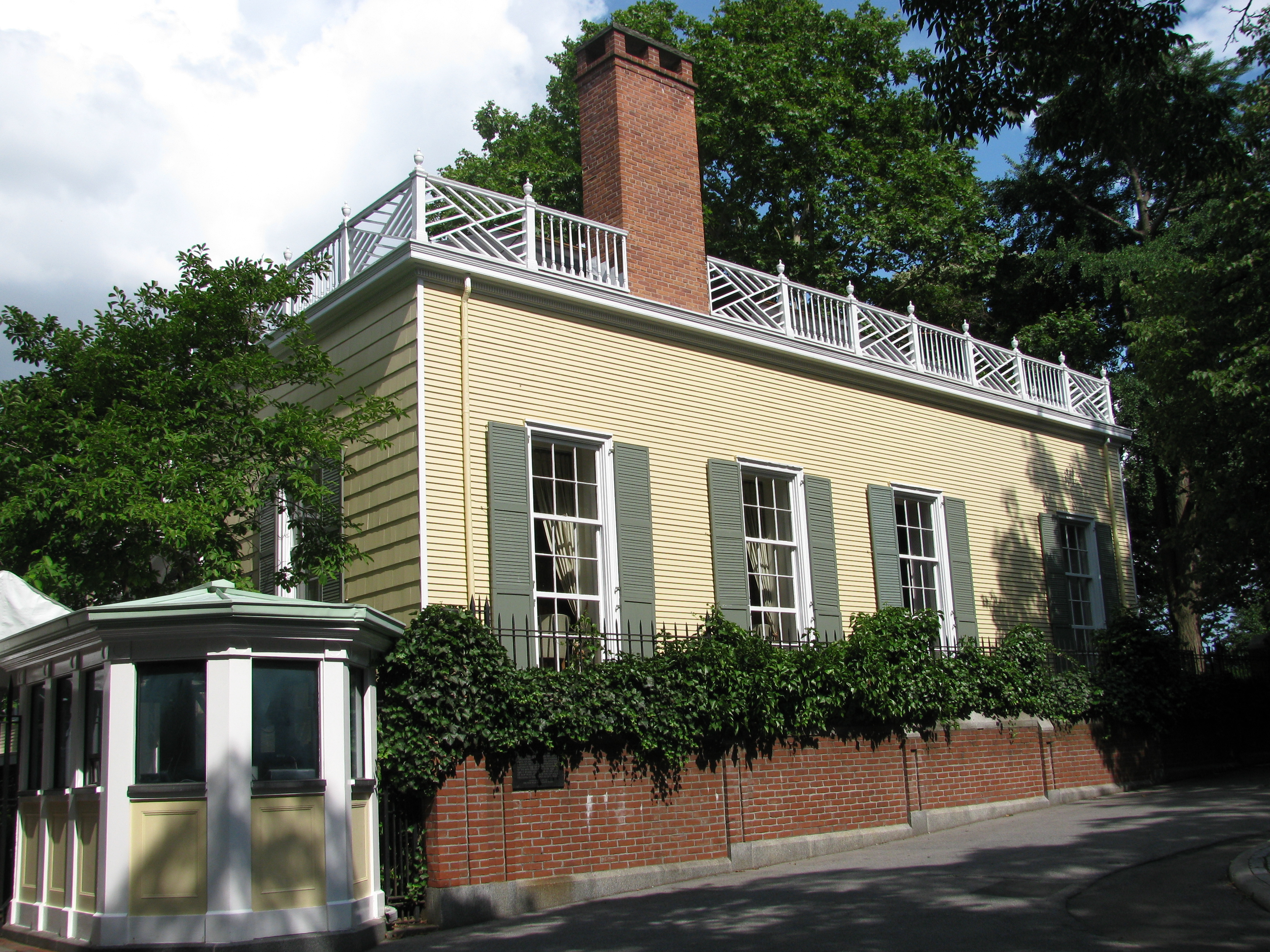
The Wagner wing as seen from the west

One writer from 1913 said that "there are evidences of its old-time grandeur, when it entertained some of the brightest men of the day in this country". Another writer said in 1922 that "no resident of such a mansion could wish to travel or to forsake its cheerful rooms always suggestive of home", while The Atlanta Constitution called it "a worthy example of the solidity and beauty of early New York architecture" in 1927. A writer for The Baltimore Sun said in 1931 that "its neat and happy present brings to mind certain outlines of its domestic past". A decade later, a writer for The Christian Science Monitor described the site "a most fitting frame for the office of the city's Chief Executive". The Christian Science Monitor writer contrasted its preservation with the planned demolition of Castle Clinton, which had been approved shortly beforehand. The New York Herald Tribune wrote that no other mayoral residence in the city's history was "more gracious or larger than Gracie Mansion".

When the Wagner annex was proposed in 1965, New York Times architecture critic Ada Louise Huxtable described it as "notable for its scholarly and appropriate good taste", compared to the original plan for the house's expansion, which she compared to a suburban garage. After the annex was completed, Huxtable said that the annex "is worth every penny that the city did not spend", in part because of the craftsmanship and furnishings of the interiors, as well as the fact that the exterior neither directly replicated nor clashed with the facade of the original mansion. The Christian Science Monitor wrote in 1966 that the annex was "of architectural and interior distinction, which reflects warmth and a welcoming sense of hospitality". In 2002, architectural historian Christopher Gray wrote that the annex's interior was "oddly oversized" and that the details in the annex's central hall, although appropriate for the 1960s, "looks like applique".

The New York Daily News wrote in 1973 that the mansion was "a dignified dowager of early American architecture" that remained a prominent presence on the East River. When the mansion's renovation was announced in 1982, a writer for the New York Daily News praised the mansion's "18th century farmhouse look, its human scale, its graceful rooms, its embracing porch and unbelievable (for Manhattan) setting" but criticized plans to convert the house into a cultural showcase. After the renovation, a reporter for the Sun Sentinel wrote in 1985 that "it is the interior decoration that has literally transformed the house" and that the previous mayors' decorations were "dowdy". Referring to Gracie Mansion and City Hall in 1987, a Times writer said: "For all its rush to change, New York, contrarily, installs its seat of power in two of the oldest, most elegant buildings with the most classical lines in New York." A reviewer for The Herald-Times wrote in 2017 that "Gracie Mansion abounds in architectural and decorative interest", citing the floor and furniture of the foyer as being of particular interest.

=== Preservation ===
Gracie Mansion was one of 6,500 buildings in the U.S. that were photographed as part of the Historic American Buildings Survey between 1933 and 1942. The New York City Landmarks Preservation Commission considered designating Gracie Mansion as a city landmark in March 1966, and the mansion was designated as such later the same year. It was added to the National Register of Historic Places in 1975, following advocacy from Beame and LPC chairwoman Beverly Moss Spatt.

=== Media and popular culture ===
The mansion was depicted in a 1952 exhibit of historic homes presented by the New-York Historical Society (N-YHS), and was the subject of another N-YHS exhibition in 1981. At the end of 1966, after the mansion's Wagner wing was completed, the wing and the original mansion were shown in a half-hour WCBS-TV broadcast. During Gracie Mansion's 1980s renovation, N-YHS curator Mary Black was commissioned to write a book about the mansion's history.

The mansion has also been the setting of, or filming location for, several fictional media works. The original footage from the TV show The Yule Log was filmed at Gracie Mansion in 1966 and shown on WPIX-TV (channel 11). Several scenes in the 1974 film The Taking of Pelham One Two Three depicted the house's exterior and interior, although the interior scenes were filmed at Wave Hill in the Bronx, where one room was redesigned to resemble Gracie Mansion. The movies Ghostbusters II (1989) and City Hall (1996) were set at Gracie Mansion, as was the 1997 novel The Puttermesser Papers by Cynthia Ozick. The mansion and its surroundings were used extensively as a setting in Linda Fairstein's 2010 novel Hell Gate; Fairstein said she had set the novel at the mansion because "it had a history and physical beauty that fascinated me".

=== Alleged haunting ===
De Blasio's wife Chirlane McCray has claimed that there are sounds of doors opening and closing by themselves, creaks from the wooden floorboard, and whispers from Archibald Gracie's daughter. Eric Adams also alleged the mansion was haunted, repeating McCray's claims. Adams also claimed to have seen objects moving around in the mansion. When a television interviewer asked him if he felt the mansion was cool enough, he responded, "No, it’s not, trust me, .... I don’t care what anyone says, there are ghosts in there, man." The alleged haunting is attributed as a possible reason for why Adams did not want to occupy the mansion for extended periods, but others have claimed that it was an excuse for Adams not to move. Upon leaving the mansion, Adams warned Mamdani about the ghost, claiming the ghost acts like a poltergeist only to individuals that do wrongs to the residents of the city. Mamdani did not report any ghosts after moving to the mansion.

== See also ==
- List of museums and cultural institutions in New York City
- List of New York City Designated Landmarks in Manhattan from 59th to 110th Streets
- National Register of Historic Places listings in Manhattan from 59th to 110th Streets
