= Judith Giuliani =

American fundraiser (born 1954)

Judi Giuliani
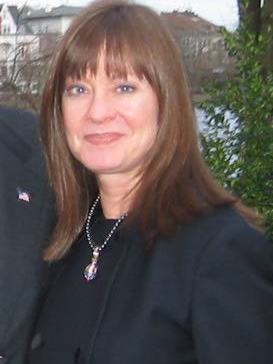
- Giuliani in 2003
- Born: Judi Ann Stish; December 16, 1954 (age 71); Hazleton, Pennsylvania, U.S.
- Education: Pennsylvania State University; New York University
- Occupations: Registered nurse Sales representative Fundraiser
- Known for: Ex-wife of former Mayor of New York Rudy Giuliani
- Political party: Republican
- Spouses: Jeffrey Ross (m. 1974; div. 1979) Bruce Nathan (m. 1979; div. 1992) Rudy Giuliani (m. 2003; div. 2019)
- Children: 1

Judi Ann Stish Ross Nathan Giuliani (born December 16, 1954) is an American registered nurse, former medical sales executive, charity fundraiser, and ex-wife of former New York City Mayor Rudy Giuliani. She was a managing director of philanthropic consulting firm Changing Our World and a founding board member of the Twin Towers Fund.

== Early life and education ==
Judi Ann Stish was born and raised in Hazleton, Pennsylvania, a town known for its coal mining history. Her family is Roman Catholic of Italian descent on her father's side and Polish descent on her mother's side. The surname Stish was previously modified from Sticia. Her father, Donald Stish Sr., was a circulation manager for The Philadelphia Inquirer, and her mother, Joan Ann (Ososki), was a homemaker. She had an older brother, Donald Jr., who died in 2004, and has a younger sister, Cyndy. As of 2007, her parents still resided in the same home where she grew up in Hazleton.

Stish graduated from Hazleton High School in 1972, where she participated in the Future Nurses Association, the Literary Society, the tennis and ski clubs, and the Diggers Club, a volunteer service organization. Interested in both the human and scientific aspects of the field, she attended a two-year nursing program, affiliated with Pennsylvania State University, at St. Luke's Hospital in Bethlehem, Pennsylvania, and graduated with a registered nurse diploma on September 1, 1974. She credits her decision to become a registered nurse as "one of the most practical, wonderful ones I ever made…because, aside from the science, you learn crisis management, decision making, prioritizing…"

== First marriages, medical sales career, motherhood ==
After graduation, Stish worked for a few months as a nurse at Sacred Heart Hospital in Allentown, Pennsylvania. On December 8, 1974, she and Jeffrey Ross, a medical supply salesman, eloped to Las Vegas and were married at the Chapel of the Bells. The couple soon relocated to Charlotte, North Carolina, where they both took jobs with U.S. Surgical Corporation in 1975 selling medical supplies in the Southeast; Judi Ross specialized in showing doctors in operating rooms a new surgical stapling method. She and Ross separated amicably after four years, and their marriage ended in divorce which was finalized on November 14, 1979. The couple had no children.

On November 19, 1979, Judi Stish Ross married wallpaper salesman Bruce Nathan, whom she had met during her separation from her first husband. Judi Nathan stopped working around that time; the couple lived in Charlotte for two years, then moved to Atlanta, Georgia. The Nathans adopted a daughter, Whitney, in March 1985. The family moved to Manhattan in 1987 and Pacific Palisades in Los Angeles in 1991. During these years, she briefly worked for DynaMed Surgical in California. She also converted from Roman Catholicism to Presbyterianism.

The Nathans' marriage fell apart during the early 1990s and led to a contested divorce case and custody battle, which included accusations of abuse from both parties. The Nathans' divorce was finalized in 1992 and she won primary custody of their child. Nathan, who used the name "Judith" from this time, moved back to New York in March 1992. Now a single mother, she worked part-time in a dentist's office and attended New York University computer and business classes at night and on weekends. Nathan received a New York nursing license and began working in 1993 as a pharmaceutical sales representative with the hospital sales division of Bristol-Myers Squibb, selling surgical supplies, anti-depressants, and antibiotics in the tough Bedford-Stuyvesant neighborhood of Brooklyn; one of her specialties was infectious diseases. Around this time Judith became romantically involved with Woodhull Hospital clinical psychologist Manos Zacharioudakis; she and her daughter lived with him for four years, until early 1999. By 1997, she became one of Bristol-Myers' top sales managers, managing a 12-person sales team.

== Relationship with and marriage to Giuliani ==
Judith Nathan met Mayor Giuliani in May 1999 at Club Macanudo, an Upper East Side cigar bar; they have said they were introduced by a doctor who is a mutual friend. Giuliani took the initiative in forming an ongoing relationship. The mayor was still married to and living with his second wife, Donna Hanover, although they had been publicly distant since 1996, and Nathan was still living with Zacharioudakis although the couple had separated a few months earlier. For most of a year, the relationship was kept secret, and in early 2000 Giuliani arranged for New York Police Department security and chauffeuring for her. By March 2000, Giuliani and Nathan were appearing together at public events; in May 2000, Giuliani publicly acknowledged her as his "very good friend" and, amidst a flurry of press scrutiny about Nathan, announced he was separating from Hanover. Nathan endeared herself to the mayor's powerful inner circle of friends and advisers. Later in 2000, Giuliani credited Nathan's nursing background in helping him through his treatment for prostate cancer. Nathan aggressively researched treatment options and Giuliani was quoted as saying, "I felt so fortunate to have not only someone who loved me and cared about me, but also someone who was an expert with an enormous amount of knowledge of medicine and science — she was the single biggest support that I had."

Judith and Rudy Giuliani became engaged in Paris in November 2002 and married on May 24, 2003. The wedding was held at Gracie Mansion and was one of only two performed by Mayor Michael Bloomberg. The reception for 400 guests included figures from the political, entertainment, and fashion worlds. The couple had a $5 million apartment off Madison Avenue on the Upper East Side in Manhattan and a $4 million summer home in The Hamptons.

Rudy Giuliani frequently cited his wife as his "closest adviser", saying in 2007 that she remained "an expert we rely on" at his company, Giuliani Partners, where he has served as chairman and chief executive officer. "She gives us a lot of advice and a lot of help in areas where she's got a lot of expertise – biological and chemical. Since we do security work, that's an area of great concern – you know, another anthrax attack, a smallpox attack, chemical agents. She knows all of that." From shortly before their marriage until his presidential campaign began, Rudy Giuliani paid her an average of $125,000 per year for her professional value as a speechwriter.

=== Role in Giuliani presidential campaign ===
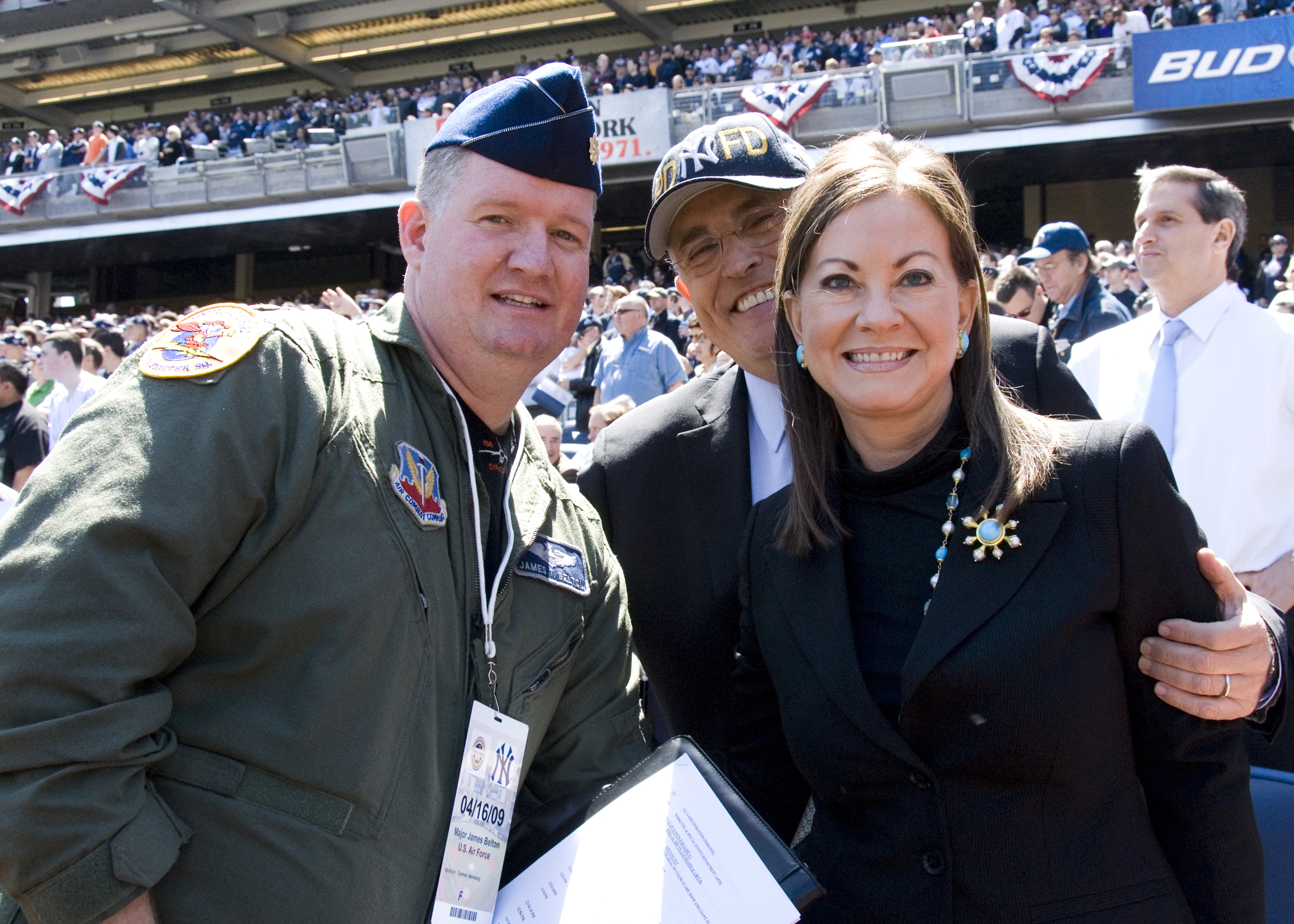
A New York Air National Guard major poses with Rudy and Judith Giuliani at the new Yankee Stadium in April 2009

As Rudy Giuliani's presidential campaign began in earnest in 2007, Judith Giuliani served as an advisor and fundraiser, but also came in for a new round of intense and often unflattering media attention. Her first marriage to Jeffrey Ross was revealed in the press for the first time, her educational background was clarified, and she appeared in a Barbara Walters interview on 20/20. During the interview, the Giulianis stated that she would sit in on Cabinet meetings were he elected, a plan that attracted criticism and that they later backed away from. There was controversy about her travel requirements and conflicts with Rudy Giuliani's aides. Media outlets portrayed her as someone aspiring to social status and given to extravagant shopping. An attempt by the campaign over summer 2007 to rehabilitate her image fell victim to internal tensions, and instead her public appearances were scaled back. Rudy Giuliani said that Judith Giuliani proved a capable fund-raiser who provided meaningful input on his policies, particularly those pertaining to health care, since she holds a two-year nursing degree and once sold pharmaceuticals.

On April 4, 2018, it was announced that Judith Giuliani had filed for divorce from her husband, Rudy Giuliani. The divorce was settled on December 10, 2019. On August 2, 2022, it was announced that Judith Giuliani had hired attorney Dror Bikel and filed a lawsuit against former husband for non-compliance regarding the divorce settlement.

== Fundraising and charitable work ==
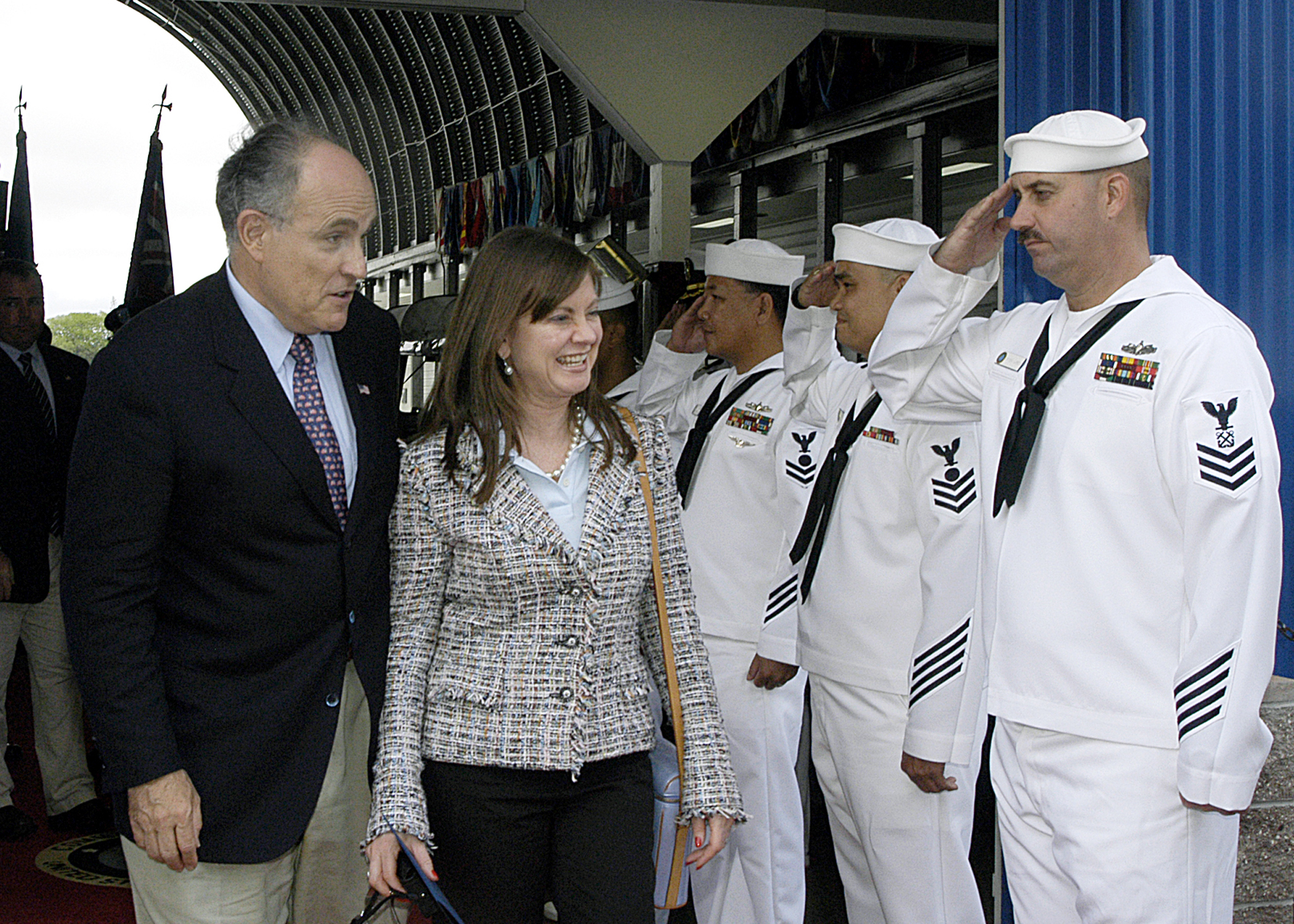
At a ceremony at Pearl Harbor in 2004

In March 2001, desiring less travel and reduced public visibility, Nathan left Bristol-Myers and became a fund-raiser and later the managing director of Changing Our World, an international fundraising and philanthropic services company headquartered in New York that helps not-for-profit groups raise money for causes such as juvenile blindness and HIV/AIDS in Africa. She left the organization in 2006.

After the September 11 attacks, Giuliani credited Nathan with coordinating the efforts of the Family Assistance Center at Pier 94, a claim disputed by the first director of New York City's Office of Emergency Management, Jerry Hauer, but supported by others who say she played a valuable role there that lasted for four months. Rudy Giuliani wrote of this period in his 2002 book, Leadership, explaining that she capably served as a solid mayoral adviser after September 11 because she "had been a nurse for many years, and afterward a pharmaceutical executive; she had managed a team of people and had many organizational skills. Further, she had wide-ranging scientific knowledge and research expertise." In addition, he said that he "put her to work helping me organize the hospitals" to assist those injured in the attacks.

She became a founding board member of the Twin Towers Fund, appointed by Giuliani, which raised and distributed $216 million to over 1,150 families and individuals. Contributions to the fund also created the TTF Scholarship Fund and America’s Camp for victims' children.

Judith Giuliani also acted as the national spokesperson for Women's Heart Advantage, which seeks to raise awareness among women and their doctors about preventing heart-related health conditions. As a spokesperson for Women's Heart Advantage, she promoted the organization as the first hospital-based program focusing on women and heart disease. In the preface to the book Mapping the New World of American Philanthropy (Wiley, 2007), Judith wrote of the opportunity the Baby-Boomer generation has to define its legacy through lasting philanthropy.

Additionally, Judith Giuliani has raised funds for Southampton Hospital, Finding a Cure for Epilepsy and Seizures (FACES), Christian Blind Mission International (CBMI), Hurricane Katrina relief in New Orleans, St. Vincent's Hospital Level 1 Trauma Unit, Cabrini High School and Cabrini Medical Center, and the McCarton School for autistic children.

Judith has been a member of the Junior League of Atlanta, GA and the Junior League of New York, NY. For her service, Judith has received the Community Award from the New York Junior League, the Spirit of Cabrini Service Award from the Cabrini Mission Foundation, and in May 2006 she received the New York University Humanitarian Award. Giuliani was recognized for her role as a nurse for humanitarian and charitable endeavors, as well as for serving as a prominent voice in promoting the nursing profession.
