= Joyce Dinkins =

American children's rights activist, literacy advocate, civil servant (1930–2020)

First Lady of New York City
- In role January 1, 1990 – December 31, 1993
- Mayor: David Dinkins
- Preceded by: Mary Beame (1977)
- Succeeded by: Donna Hanover

Personal details
- Born: Joyce Elizabeth Burrows; December 22, 1930 New York City, U.S.
- Died: October 10, 2020 (aged 89) New York City, U.S.
- Party: Democratic
- Spouse: David Dinkins (m. 1953)
- Relations: Daniel Burrows (father)
- Education: Howard University (BA)

Joyce Elizabeth Dinkins (née Burrows; December 22, 1930 – October 10, 2020) was an American children's rights activist, literacy advocate, civil servant, and wife of former New York City mayor David Dinkins. She was the first lady of New York City from 1990 to 1993, becoming the city's first African American first lady in history. Dinkins was a proponent of child welfare, education, and literacy initiatives during her tenure.

== Biography ==
=== Early life ===
Dinkins was born Joyce Elizabeth Burrows in Manhattan on December 22, 1930. She was one of her family's two daughters, along with her older sister, Gloria. Her mother, Elaine (née Nelthrop) Burrows, was a businesswoman, while her father, Daniel L. Burrows, was a liquor store owner and real estate broker. Her family moved from Manhattan to Yonkers, New York, when she was an elementary school student, but quickly moved back to Harlem approximately one year later due to racial discrimination in Yonkers. Dinkins and her sister, who were the only black students at their Yonkers school, endured racial taunts during that time. In 1989, Dinkins spoke of the incidents in an interview with Newsday, "It makes you aware that racism exists. Prior to that, we had never encountered anything to that degree."

Daniel Burrows became one of the first black elected officials in New York City and New York State. He was first elected as a Democratic district leader in Manhattan, before being elected to the New York State Assembly in 1939. Daniel Burrows later became a political mentor and advisor to his son-in-law, David Dinkins.

Joyce Burrows graduated from George Washington High School in Washington Heights. She then attended Howard University in Washington D.C., where she received her Bachelor of Arts degree in sociology in 1953. At Howard, Joyce joined Delta Sigma Theta sorority and became the Homecoming Queen. Burrows met her future husband, David Dinkins, while both were students at Howard University. The couple married in August 1953, shortly after her graduation.

Back in New York, Joyce Dinkins initially planned to become a social worker, but deferred her career plans once her children, David N. Dinkins Jr. and Donna Dinkins, reached elementary school. She also cared for her mother, who had been diagnosed with multiple sclerosis. Instead, Dinkins found work in accounting and civil service, while her husband pursued a legal and political career. She also actively campaigned for her husband during his campaigns for Manhattan Borough President and Mayor of New York City in the 1980s.

=== First Lady of New York City ===
By 1989, when David Dinkins was elected Mayor of New York City, Joyce Dinkins was the coordinator of metropolitan affairs for the New York State Department of Taxation and Finance. She retired shortly before her husband's mayoral inauguration to focus on her role as first lady.

Joyce Dinkins served as First Lady of New York City from 1990 until 1993 during Mayor Dinkins' single term in office. David Dinkins was the city's first black mayor, while Joyce Dinkins became the first African-American first lady in history. Additionally, Joyce Dinkins was also the city's first mayor's wife and First Lady since Mary Beame left the position in 1978, as David Dinkins' predecessor, Ed Koch, was a lifelong bachelor. Dinkins accepted her new role, noting in a 1989 interview that "Basically up until this point in my life I have been a private person. However, I understand that that will no longer be possible. So I will adjust in time because I like people." She considered herself as her husband's partner, rather than an advisor, saying, "I give my opinions. I can’t say he always accepts them."

The New York Times noted that Dinkins' visible role as the city's first lady made her "a role model for millions of African-Americans." Dinkins used her position to promote a number of causes, including literacy and education initiatives, children's rights, and the prevention of child abuse. She particularly active in issues related to education. Dinkins created the "Reading Is Recreation" literacy initiative for public school students in 1990. Dinkins served as the honorary chairwoman of the Mayor's Task Force on Child Abuse. She also headed a city-wide, multimedia public service campaign called "The First Day Back to School".

=== Later life ===
Mayor Dinkins lost re-election in 1993 and left office after one term, but Joyce Dinkins remained active in civic and educational organizations. She joined the board of directors of WNET (the New York City PBS television station), the New York Urban League, Big Brothers Big Sisters of New York City, the Historic House Trust, and the Early Stages Theater. The Schomburg Center for Research in Black Culture in Harlem also established a new collection of children's books, which was named the Joyce B. Dinkins Children's Collection in her honor.

Joyce Dinkins died at her home in the Lenox Hill neighborhood of the Upper East Side, Manhattan, on October 10, 2020, at the age of 89. Her husband of 67 years, former Mayor David Dinkins, died just over one month later on November 23, 2020. Dinkins was survived by her two children, David N. Dinkins Jr. and Donna Dinkins Hoggard, and two grandchildren. The Dinkins were longtime members of the Church of the Intercession, an Episcopal church in Upper Manhattan.

Honorary titles
| Preceded by Mary Beame (1977) | First Lady of New York City; 1990–1993 | Succeeded by Donna Hanover |
