= Donna Hanover =

American journalist (born 1950)

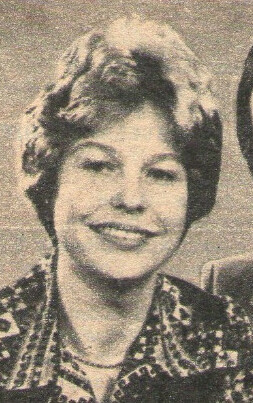
- Hanover, circa 1977

First Lady of New York City
- In role January 1, 1994 – December 31, 2001
- Mayor: Rudy Giuliani
- Preceded by: Joyce Dinkins
- Succeeded by: Diana Taylor (de facto)

Personal details
- Born: Donna Ann Kofnovec; February 15, 1950 (age 76) Oakland, California, U.S.
- Spouses: Stanley Hanover (m. 1972; div. 1980) Rudy Giuliani (m. 1984; div. 2002) Edwin Oster (m. 2003)
- Children: Andrew; Caroline
- Education: Stanford University (BA); Columbia University (MA)

Donna Ann Hanover (née Kofnovec; born February 15, 1950) is an American journalist, radio and television personality, television producer, and actress, who appears on CUNY TV in New York City. From 1994 through 2001, she was First Lady of New York City, as the wife of Rudy Giuliani. She and Giuliani were married for 18 years, and had two children, Andrew and Caroline.

== Early life and education ==
Hanover was born Donna Ann Kofnovec in Oakland, California, to Catholic parents, Robert G. Kofnovec, a United States Navy officer who retired as a Lieutenant Commander, and his wife, Gwendolyn Dolores (Domas) Kofnovec.

Hanover attended Fremont High School in Sunnyvale, California. She later attended Stanford University, and graduated in 1972 with a Bachelor of Arts in political science. She met Harvard University graduate Stanley Hanover at Stanford in 1968 and the two were married after her graduation in 1972. The couple moved to New York City. She then attended the Columbia University Graduate School of Journalism and graduated with a master's degree in journalism.

== Broadcasting career ==
As Donna Hanover she began to work in a series of television journalism positions around the country, starting with a stint at WKTV in Utica, New York in 1973, where she was also an associate faculty member at Utica College. She then went to WTVN-TV in Columbus, Ohio. By 1977, she was working in Pittsburgh, Pennsylvania at KDKA-TV, spending 80-hour weeks hosting and producing their Evening Magazine show; she and Stanley Hanover appeared to have separated. They were divorced sometime after October 1980; they had no children.

By 1980, Hanover had moved to Miami, Florida; it was when she was working as an anchor at WCKT that she met Giuliani. The couple moved in together in 1982 while Giuliani was still married to his first wife, from whom he had been separated since 1976. Giuliani had his first marriage annulled in late 1983. They then later moved to Washington, D.C. and then New York, and were married there on April 15, 1984. Hanover began working for WPIX in 1983, and was the lead anchor for the station's 7:30 pm weeknight newscast for much of the second half of the 1980s. She also appeared on the syndicated The Wall Street Journal Report. She left her anchor role during Giuliani's unsuccessful 1989 bid for mayor to go on maternity leave.

Hanover had two children with Giuliani, Andrew (born 1986; served as Special Assistant to the President and Associate Director of the Office of Public Liaison for U.S. President Donald Trump in his first term) and Caroline (born 1989). She began to use Donna Hanover Giuliani as her name in some contexts, but still used Donna Hanover in others. She left WPIX entirely in 1990, and did some freelance work for WNYW in 1992 and 1993.

== First Lady of New York City ==
In 1993 she actively campaigned for her husband during his successful campaign for Mayor, appearing in his television ads as a devoted wife and mother. In 1994, she became First Lady of New York City. In addition to her duties as first lady, she was a features reporter for WNYW's morning Good Day New York show, rotating anchor of WNYW's Good Day Sunday program, and a co-anchor on the national cable Food Network's Food News and Views program. She balanced these positions with her political and maternal roles by eschewing some of the production work she had done in the past. In addition, she worked from time to time as a radio disc jockey for New York's WYNY. The dual, concurrent roles as a journalist and political wife led to discussions of a possible conflict of interest, but even Giuliani political opponents such as Peter Vallone, Sr. respected her professionalism.

Hanover branched out into acting, having a prominent role as real-life presidential sister Ruth Carter Stapleton in the 1996 film The People vs. Larry Flynt; noted critic Frank Rich called her performance brilliant. She also appeared in the feature film Ransom that same year as a WNYW reporter. By 1996, she had reverted to only using Donna Hanover as her name and her public appearances with Rudy Giuliani became few. By 1997 there were published reports of his having an affair with mayoral aide Cristyne Lategano, and by 2000 with Judith Nathan. Hanover continued her acting work, appearing from 1997 on in episodes of the television series Law & Order in a recurring role as Judge Deborah Bourke, and also appearing on series such as Family Law, The Practice, Sex and the City, and Ally McBeal.

In April 2000, Hanover accepted the lead role in Eve Ensler's play The Vagina Monologues, a feminist work that was known for previously casting high-profile actresses such as Gillian Anderson, Melissa Etheridge, Calista Flockhart and Winona Ryder, among others. Veteran New Yorker contributor Peter J. Boyer asserted that Hanover's acceptance of the role was a "well-struck blow" because Ensler was "an outspoken critic of Giuliani's policies." Before Hanover's debut, she postponed her participation in The Vagina Monologues on May 2 to support her husband a week after it was announced he had prostate cancer. On the evening after announcing his cancer diagnosis, reporters observed Rudy Giuliani having "a romantic dinner" with Judith Nathan, the woman who would be identified as his lover. One week later, at a press conference on May 10, Giuliani announced that he and Hanover were officially separated. Hanover had not been informed and was surprised by the news.

Giuliani filed for divorce in October 2000. Hanover and Giuliani stopped cohabiting at the end of his term in December 2001. Hanover counter filed in June 2002. After ugly public battles between representatives of the two, the divorce was finalized in July 2002 after he left office as Mayor; Hanover was awarded $6.8 million and custody of their two children.

== Subsequent life and career ==
In 2003, Hanover married Edwin Oster, an attorney practicing in Newport Beach, California. The two had dated in high school and in college, but had not spoken with each other for more than 20 years, until after Hanover's divorce from Giuliani. In 2005, Hanover published the book My Boyfriend's Back: 50 True Stories of Reconnecting with a Long-Lost Love, relating her story as well as those of others who had rejoined with lost loves. She lives in both New York and California.

She continued to work in broadcasting. During 2005, she also hosted the Fine Living cable channel's Famous Homes & Hideaways program. She did fill-in work for New York radio station WOR for several years, then joined it on a full-time basis in February 2006, working first with co-host Ed Walsh and then as of August 2006 with Joe Bartlett. The latter pairing subsequently won an award for best broadcasting team. In May 2008 the two were replaced in the morning slot by the returning John R. Gambling, but she remained with the station as a film critic and fill-in host. Hanover also worked as an adjunct professor at New York University's Department of Journalism. She continued to be active in charity circles.

Hanover continued her acting career with appearances in Law & Order through 2004. She was in the films Superstar with Will Ferrell in 1999, Keeping the Faith with Edward Norton in 2000, Someone Like You with Ellen Barkin in 2001, and Interview directed by Steve Buscemi in 2007. Hanover played a Senator opposite John Goodman in an episode of Alpha House in 2014, and appeared in the TV comedy Odd Mom Out in 2015 and 2016. In 2011 she appeared in the off-Broadway initial run of "Picked", written by Chris Shinn and directed by Michael Wilson at The Vineyard Theatre. Hanover made her Broadway debut in 2012 in Gore Vidal's The Best Man, directed by Michael Wilson and also starring James Earl Jones, Angela Lansbury, John Larroquette, and Candace Bergen. Hanover continues her work as a journalist at CUNY TV which she joined in 2011. As a correspondent on shows including Arts in the City and Simply Science, she has covered wide-ranging topics such as vintage costumer Helen Uffner, a new toilet NASA sent up for astronauts in space, and Broadway shows reopening after the pandemic.

== Awards ==
- 1980s — Pinnacle Award from American Women in Radio & Television for "Advertising by Plastic Surgeons"
- 1984 — New York State Associated Press Broadcasters' Association Award for "A Profile of Bobby Williams, A Handicapped Child"
- 1989 — San Francisco State University Broadcasts Award for "Suffer the Children"
- 2007 — New York State Broadcasters Association's Outstanding On-Air Broadcast Team award (with Joe Bartlett)

Honorary titles
Preceded by Joyce Dinkins	First Lady of New York City; 1994–2002	Succeeded by Diana Taylor (de facto); Chirlane McCray (2014)
