= Feehan (disambiguation) =

Feehan is an Irish surname.

Feehan may also refer to:

- Bishop Feehan High School, Attleboro, Massachusetts
- E. D. Feehan Catholic High School, Saskatoon, Saskatchewan
- Feehan Triangle, a public green space in Queens, New York
- William M. Feehan (fireboat), operated by the New York City Fire Department
