= Peter J. Ganci Jr. =

American firefighter chief (1946–2001)

- Born: Peter James Ganci Jr. October 27, 1946; Queens, New York, U.S.
- Died: September 11, 2001 (aged 54); World Trade Center, New York City, U.S.
- Cause of death: Collapse of the North Tower during the September 11 attacks
- Monuments: National September 11 Memorial & Museum, panel S-17
- Occupation: Firefighter
- Employer: Fire Department New York
- Spouse: Kathleen
- Children: 3

Peter James Ganci Jr. (October 27, 1946 – September 11, 2001) was a career firefighter in the New York City Fire Department who died in the September 11 terrorist attacks. At the time of the attacks, he held the rank of Chief of Department, the highest ranking uniformed fire officer in the department.

== Early life ==
Peter James Ganci Jr. was born on October 27, 1946, and raised in Farmingdale, New York.

== Career ==
Prior to joining the Fire Department, Ganci served in the 82nd Airborne Division. Having never been deployed, Ganci was on leave at home with a firefighter friend who told him about the death of four firefighters from Engine 18 in the 23rd Street Fire in Manhattan. Ganci, at that moment, realized that there is a dangerous aspect to fighting fires as well. While still a volunteer with the Farmingdale Fire Department, Ganci was with the same friend one day who told him he was planning to transfer to another station in the city. Following the conversation and his discharge from the Army in 1968, Ganci signed up and was accepted into the New York City Fire Department in 1968.

Ganci joined the New York City Fire Department in 1968, serving in engine and ladder companies in Brooklyn and the Bronx, beginning with Engine Company 92 in the Bronx and then subsequently Ladder Company 111. During this time in the FDNY, a time described by The New York Times as "an era of crisis", fire companies battled arson fires almost continually in the city's poorest neighborhoods. Ganci was promoted to lieutenant in 1977, captain in 1983, battalion chief in 1987, and deputy chief in 1993, when he was working in Bedford-Stuyvesant, Brooklyn. In 1994 Ganci was made the head of the Bureau of Fire Investigation following the appointment as fire commissioner of Howard Safir, who needed a uniformed chief to address conflicts between fire marshals and uniformed firefighters, a conflict whose resolution Safir credits to Ganci. In January 1997 Ganci replaced his boss Donald Burns as Chief of Operations, the second highest uniformed position in the Fire Department.

=== During the September 11 attacks ===
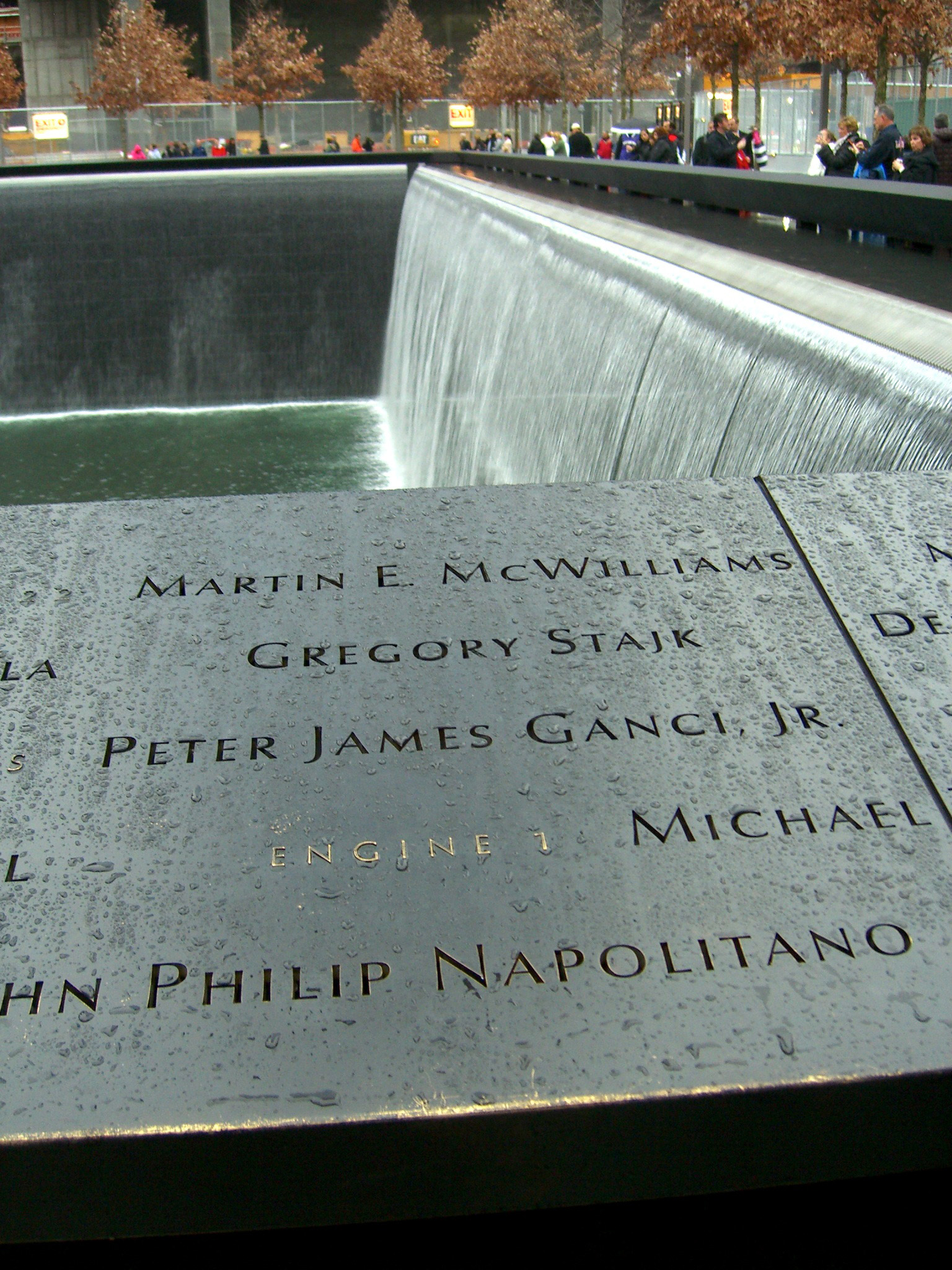
Ganci's name is located on Panel S-17 of the National September 11 Memorial & Museum’s South Pool, along with those of other first responders.

On the morning of the attacks, Ganci's best friend and executive assistant, Steve Mosiello, was going to drive Ganci to court, where Ganci had been scheduled for jury duty. However, immediately after American Airlines Flight 11 hit the North Tower (1 World Trade Center) at 8:46 a.m. Ganci, Mosiello, and Chief of Operations Danny Nigro rushed there from their command post in downtown Brooklyn. Driving there in Ganci's car, they arrived on the scene in less than 10 minutes, and set up a command post on a ramp leading to the underground garage under 2 World Financial Center, directly across the West Side Highway from the North Tower. There, he witnessed United Airlines Flight 175 hit the South Tower at 9:03 a.m. At 9:59 a.m., the collapse of the South Tower forced Ganci, Mosiello, and others to seek shelter in the basement garage of 2 World Financial Center. After digging themselves out from the garage, Ganci ordered his men to set up a different command post in a safer location, farther north of the buildings, and ordered Mosiello to acquire backup. However, Ganci himself returned to the buildings, coming to stand in front of 1 World Trade Center, where he was directing the rescue efforts with a multichannel radio, when the building collapsed. He and Mayor Rudy Giuliani had spoken just minutes before, when Giuliani had left for his command post, following Ganci's instruction to Giuliani for the fire commissioners and others to clear the area because it was apparent the North Tower would fall. However, Ganci himself did not evacuate the area, saying, "I'm not leaving my men", and remained at that location with First Deputy Commissioner William Feehan.

Ganci and Feehan were killed when the North Tower collapsed at 10:28 a.m. After a rescue dog located Ganci's body, Ganci's fire team, including Mosiello, pulled it from beneath four feet of debris. Ganci's former supervisor, Howard Safir, commented that Ganci "would never ask anyone to do something he didn't do himself. It didn't surprise me that he was right at the front lines. You would never see Pete five miles away, in some command center."

Ganci was survived by his sisters, Mary Dougherty and Ellen Ganci, his brothers, Dan and Jim, his wife, Kathleen, their sons, Peter Ganci III (a firefighter assigned to Ladder Company 111 in Brooklyn) and Christopher (also a firefighter in the FDNY), and their daughter Danielle, who lived with Ganci in Massapequa, New York.

== Legacy and memorials ==
Manas Air Base in Kyrgyzstan was unofficially renamed for him as Ganci Air Base.

On Memorial Day in 2003, the post office at 380 Main Street in Farmingdale, New York, was named for him.

In 2003 Ganci's son, Christopher M. Ganci, wrote a biography of Ganci.

At the National September 11 Memorial & Museum, Ganci is memorialized at the South Pool, on Panel S-17.

On September 8, 2020, it was announced that the James Gordon Bennett Medal for conspicuous bravery would be renamed for Ganci.

As of May 2020, Christopher M. Ganci is a FDNY Battalion Chief.
