= Joseph F. Bruno =

American judge

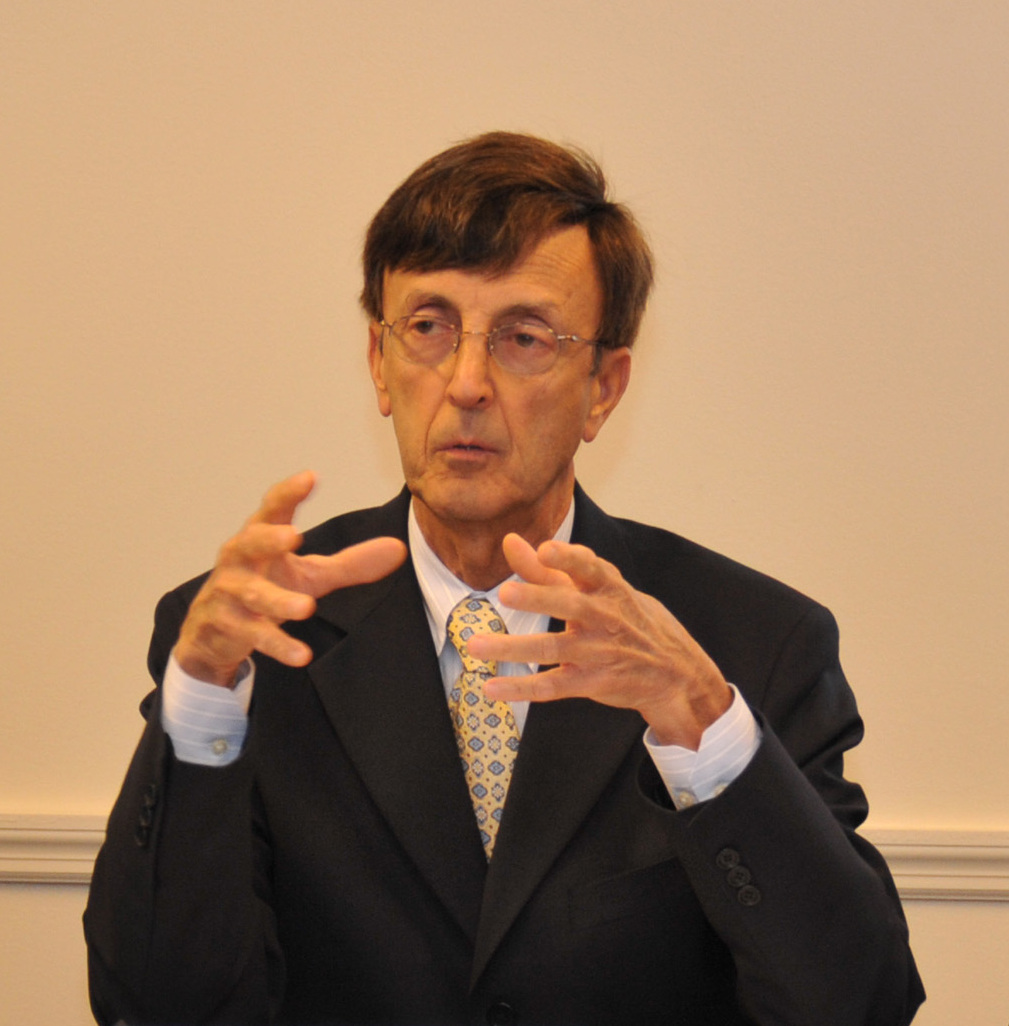
- Joseph Bruno in 2010

Commissioner of NYC Emergency Management
- In office March 2004 – June 27, 2014
- Mayor: Michael Bloomberg; Bill de Blasio
- Preceded by: John T. Odermatt
- Succeeded by: Joseph Esposito

Commissioner of the Fire Department of the City of New York
- In office November 16, 1987 – December 31, 1989
- Mayor: Ed Koch
- Preceded by: Joseph E. Spinnato
- Succeeded by: Carlos M. Rivera

Personal details
- Born: 1944 (age 81–82)

Joseph F. Bruno (born c. 1944) is a public official in New York City who has served as a lawyer, FDNY Fire Commissioner, New York City Civil Court Judge and New York State Supreme Court Judge. He most recently served as Commissioner of the New York City Office of Emergency Management.

Bruno is now president of Helen Keller Services, a post he has held since January, 2016.

== Education ==
Bruno graduated from City College in 1966 with a B.S. in Economics and in 1968, he earned a Juris Doctor from St. John's University Law School. In 1988, he was awarded an honorary Doctor of Law degree from St. John's Law School.

== Career ==
His career in public service began in 1971, when he joined the New York City Law Department as a trial attorney.

=== NYC Fire Commissioner ===
He served in various Law Department posts and on October 20, 1987, he was appointed the 26th Fire Commissioner of the City of New York by Mayor Edward I. Koch. Under his leadership, the Fire Department developed a major fire safety education campaign, with particular emphasis on children and senior citizens. He continued to serve as Fire Commissioner until the end of the Koch Administration on December 31, 1989.

=== NYC Civil Court and NYS State Supreme Court Judge ===
In 1991, Bruno was elected to the Civil Court of the City of New York and assigned to the Criminal Court. In 1996, he was elevated to Acting Justice of the Supreme Court of the State of New York, Kings County, and elected Justice of Supreme Court in 2002.

=== Commissioner of NYC Emergency Management ===
In March 2004, Mayor Michael Bloomberg appointed Joseph F. Bruno commissioner of the New York City Office of Emergency Management (NYC OEM). He was the fourth head of the agency since it was established in 1996.

Among his first major initiatives, Commissioner Bruno successfully oversaw New York City's adoption and implementation of the Citywide Incident Management System (CIMS). CIMS is now the city's standard for responding to and managing emergencies and planned events.

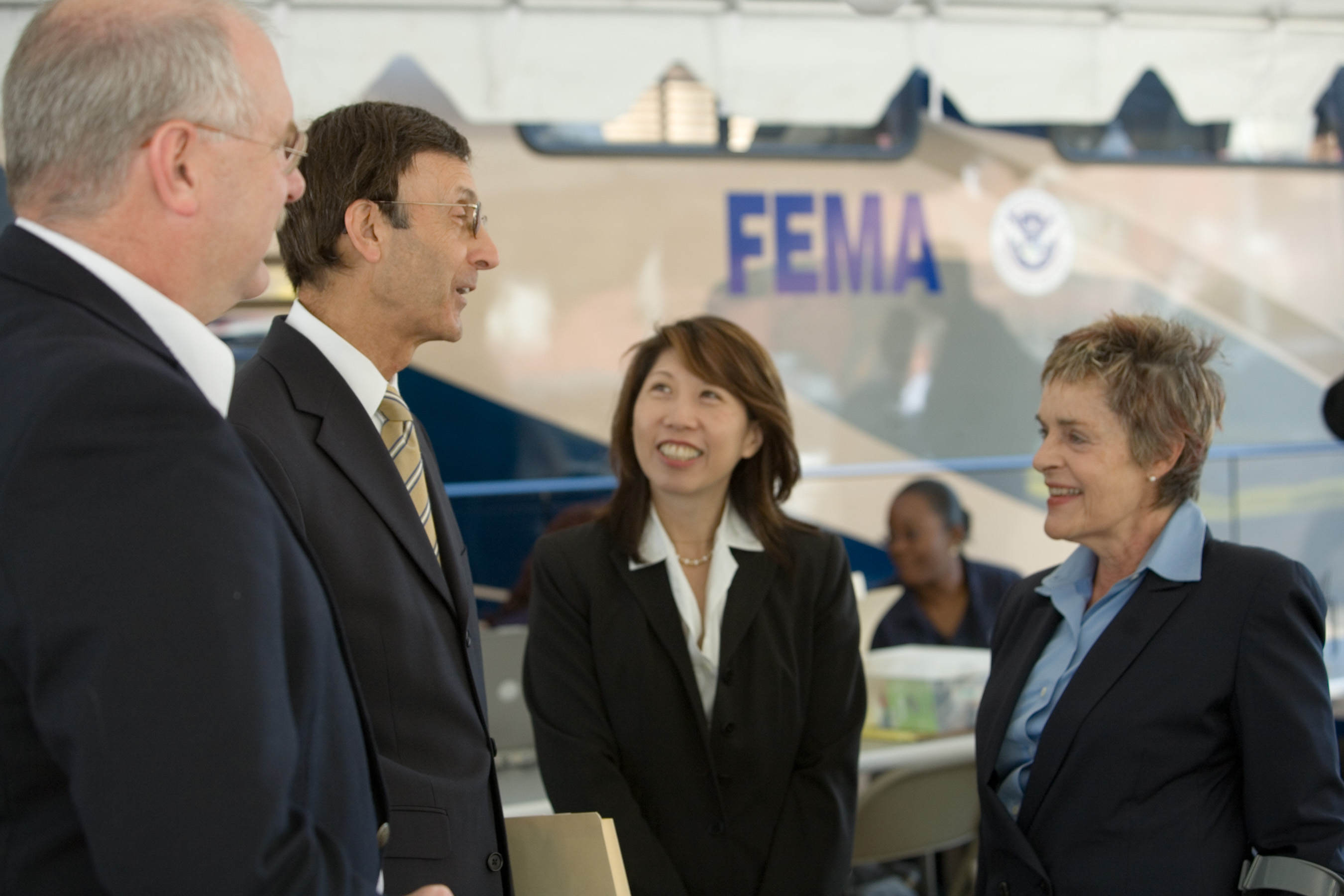
Bruno and other officials visit the Mobile Disaster Assistance Service Center in Williamsburg, 2007

Commissioner Bruno also oversaw the comprehensive revision of the city's Coastal Storm Plan to ensure the city is prepared for a worst-case scenario hurricane and can shelter more than 600,000 residents. OEM also developed the "What if New York City…," a post-disaster housing competition that challenged teams of architects and planners to design temporary housing for dense, urban environments. This marked a critical step in New York City's effort to plan ahead for long-term housing after a catastrophic disaster.

During his tenure, Commissioner Bruno has successfully coordinated the city's responses to a variety of emergency and planned incidents. He headed the city's plan to maintain order during the 2005 New York City transit strike – three days that left New Yorkers with no subway service and minimal bus transportation. After the devastation of Hurricane Katrina, he oversaw the development and operation of a Family Assistance Center to assist victims who migrated to New York City. Commissioner Bruno also managed the city's responses to the Queens blackout in 2006, the 2007 New York City steam explosion in midtown Manhattan, the 2007 Brooklyn tornadoes, two major crane collapses in 2008, the outbreak of the H1N1 virus in 2009, and two tornados and a microburst in 2010.

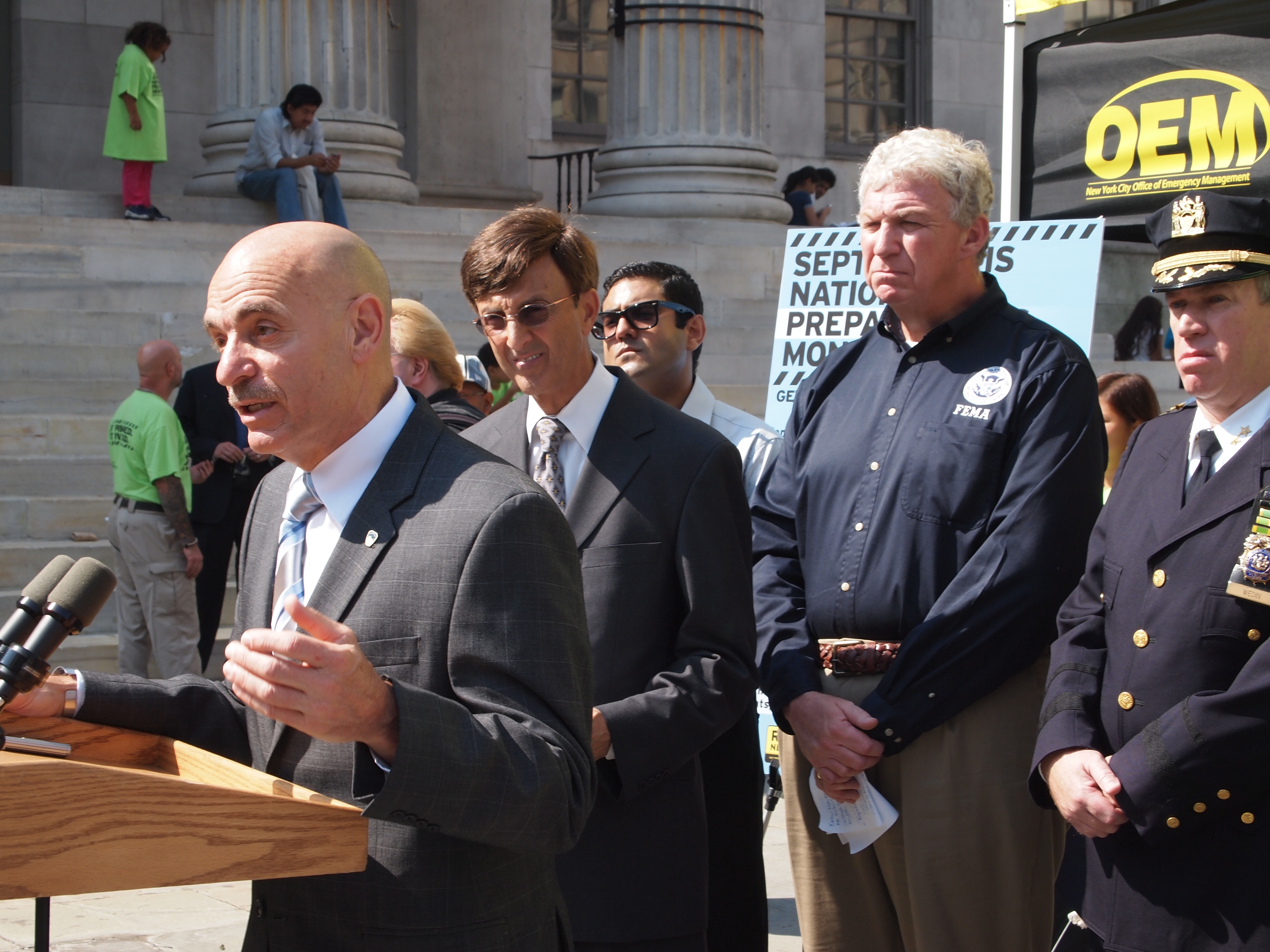
Joseph Bruno (2nd from left) looks on as New York City Fire Commissioner Salvatore Cassano speaks at a National Preparedness Month Event in Brooklyn, New York, 2010

At the end of 2010 and into 2011, the commissioner coordinated responses to winter storms that led to a number of new winter storm initiatives, like the creation of a tow-truck task force and live video monitoring of road conditions.

In August 2011, Commissioner Bruno coordinated the city's response to Hurricane Irene, the worst coastal storm to hit the City in more than a decade. The City took unprecedented steps to prepare for the storm, including a mandatory evacuation of more than 370,000 residents in low-lying areas and the entire Rockaway peninsula, a complete shutdown of public transportation, the evacuation of 7,000 patients from hospitals and nursing homes, and opening more than 80 evacuation centers and emergency shelters. The city's careful planning and coordinated response to Irene helped minimize the storm's damage.

Highlighting the importance of preparedness, more than 10 million emergency preparedness guides have been distributed through the Ready New York campaign under Commissioner Bruno's leadership. And with the commissioner's support, NYC's Community Emergency Response Team (CERT) program has grown to over 56 teams and 1,500 volunteers trained in basic emergency response, preparedness, and first aid. Commissioner Bruno also added OEM's technological expertise to the creation of Notify NYC, an emergency notification system for New York City residents that uses text messaging, e-mail and phone to warn subscribers about emergencies.

Joseph F. Bruno resigned as the Commissioner of Emergency Management on June 27, 2014.

Fire appointments
Preceded by Joseph E. Spinnato	FDNY Commissioner; 1987–1989	Succeeded by Carlos M. Rivera
Political offices
Preceded by John T. Odermatt	Commissioner, NYC Emergency Management; 2004–2014	Succeeded by Joseph Esposito
