= Central Park Medical Unit =

Volunteer ambulance service in New York, United States

Coordinates: 42°21′58″N 71°15′19″W

Central Park Medical Unit (CPMU)
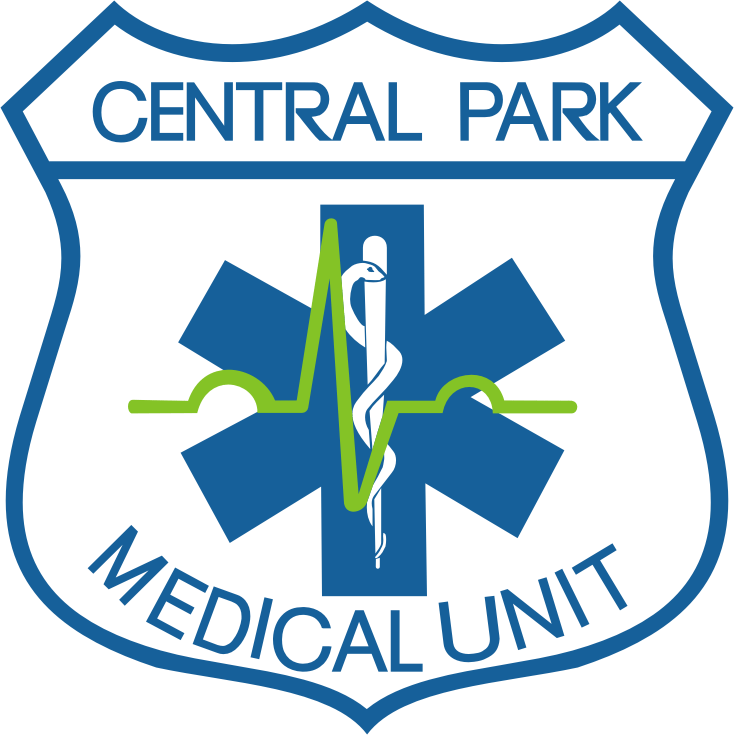
- Established: 1975
- Headquarters: New York City, United States
- Jurisdiction: Central Park
- Volunteers: 150
- BLS or ALS: BLS
- Ambulances: 4
- Fly-cars: 1 Polaris utility vehicle, 4 mountain bikes
- Director: Rafael Castellanos
- Responses: 3,000/year
- Website: www.cpmu.com

The Central Park Medical Unit (CPMU) is an all-volunteer ambulance service that provides completely free emergency medical service to patrons of Central Park and the surrounding streets, in Manhattan, New York City, United States.

== Description ==
CPMU's 150 certified emergency medical technicians respond to 3,000 calls annually. Many of these calls are true medical emergencies resulting in life saving care—which represents over two and a half million dollars in free care to the people of New York City. CPMU's ambulances have a response time consistently under three minutes, the lowest of any ambulance corps in the state of New York. CPMU has been recognized by numerous city and state officials, including citations from the New York City Police Department, Fire Department, Office of Emergency Management, and Department of Parks and Recreation.

Members of CPMU range from college students to retirees. As one of the few opportunities to volunteer as an EMT in Manhattan, CPMU trains recent EMT graduates in the practical application of their skills. CPMU is completely funded by private donations, relying on the support of corporations and individuals and receiving no financial support from the city, state, or federal governments.

In addition to its three ambulances, CPMU also operates a rapid-response bike patrol and a roller skating patrol. The patrol is active particularly during major events such as the New York City Marathon, the 1998 Goodwill Games, and concerts in Central Park (like the 2003 Dave Matthews Band Concert and the 2008 Bon Jovi Concert). CPMU has also helped the greater New York City community during the 1993 World Trade Center bombing, the September 11, 2001 attacks on the World Trade Center, the American Airlines Flight 587 crash, the 2003 North America blackout as well as Hurricane Sandy.

== History ==
CPMU was founded in 1975 after some local New Yorkers realized a need for rapid medical response in Central Park. Ambulance response times could take as long as 90 minutes in the park and ambulance crews did not have much navigational knowledge of the park's geography. CPMU was founded as the "Central Park Medical Rescue Squad."

The Central Park Medical Rescue Squad was primarily a first response unit that consisted of approximately twenty volunteers, a few personal bicycles and a retrofitted Ford van used to transport crews and equipment. Later a stretcher was added to the van to allow for transport of patients when city EMS was not available. In 1976, the Central Park Medical Rescue Squad purchased a used type II ambulance from Lenox Hill Hospital. This allowed them to become a full-fledged, transporting emergency medical unit. In 1979, the rescue squad incorporated as a not-for-profit corporation and was renamed the "Central Park Medical Unit."
