= Bernard Kerik =

American police officer and political consultant (1955–2025)

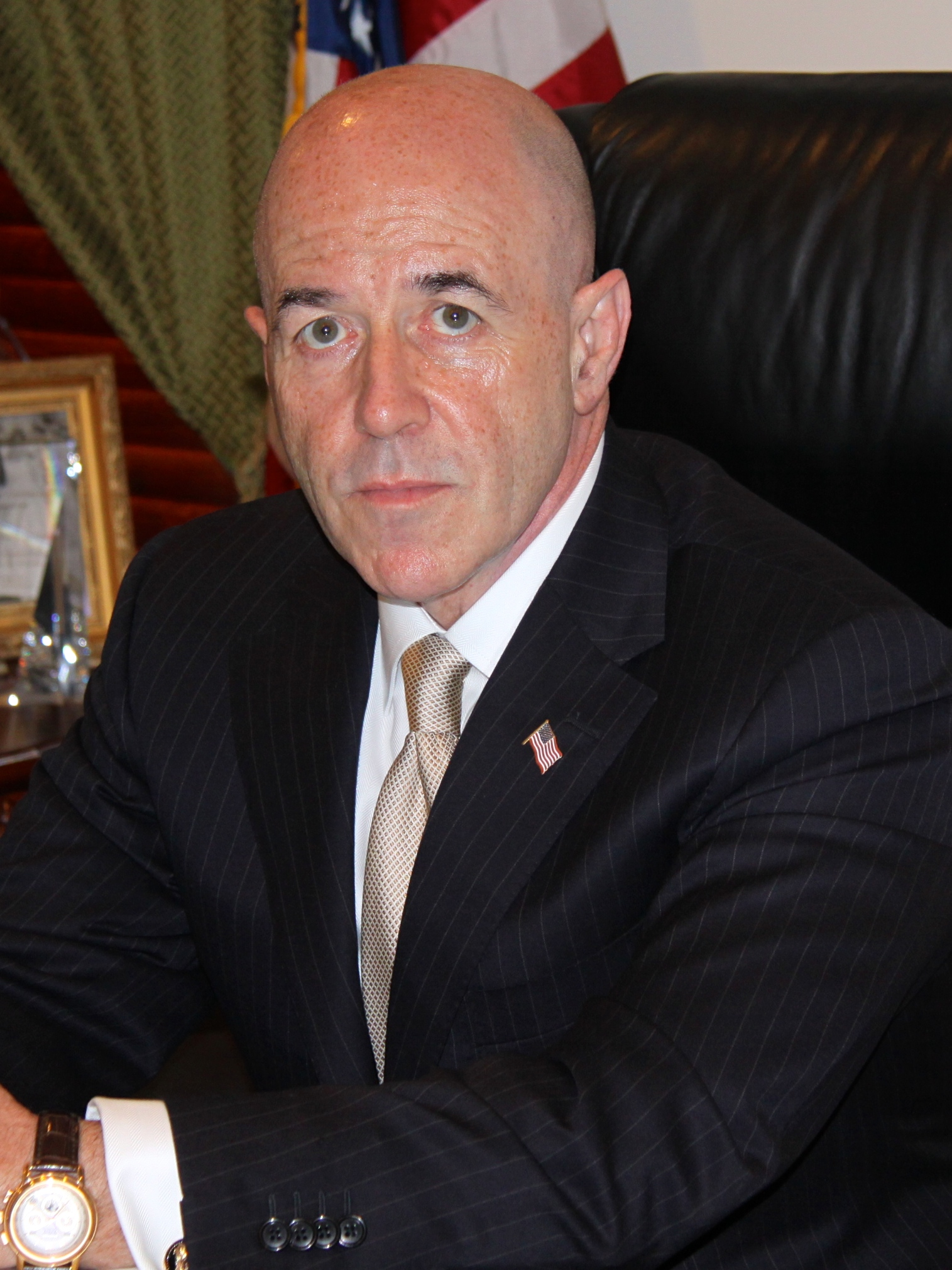
- Kerik in 2013

Minister of the Interior of Iraq Acting
- In office May 18, 2003 – September 2, 2003
- Chief Executive: Paul Bremer
- Preceded by: Mahmud Dhiyab
- Succeeded by: Nuri Badran

40th Police Commissioner of New York City
- In office August 21, 2000 – December 31, 2001
- Appointed by: Rudy Giuliani
- Preceded by: Howard Safir
- Succeeded by: Raymond Kelly

Commissioner of the New York City Department of Correction
- In office 1998–2000
- Appointed by: Rudy Giuliani
- Preceded by: Michael Jacobsen
- Succeeded by: Gary Lanigan

Personal details
- Born: Bernard Bailey Kerik; September 4, 1955 Newark, New Jersey, U.S.
- Died: May 29, 2025 (aged 69) New York City, U.S.
- Party: Republican
- Spouses: Linda Hales (m. 1978; div. 1983) Jaqueline Llerena (m. 1983; div. 1992) Hala Matli (m. 1998)
- Children: 4
- Education: Empire State College (BS)

Military service
- Allegiance: United States
- Branch/service: United States Army
- Years of service: 1974–1977
- Police and Corrections Career
- Department: Passaic County Sheriff's Office; New York City Police Department; New York City Department of Correction
- Service years: 1981–1986 (PCSO); 1986–1994, 2000–2001 (NYPD); 1994–2000 (NYCDOC)
- Rank: Commissioner
- Criminal information
- Criminal charges: Tax fraud & Making false statements
- Penalty: 4 years federal prison

Bernard Bailey Kerik (September 4, 1955 – May 29, 2025) was an American consultant and police officer who was the 40th commissioner of the New York Police Department from 2000 to 2001.

Kerik joined the New York City Police Department (NYPD) in 1986. He served from 1998 to 2000 as commissioner of the New York City Department of Correction and from 2000 to 2001 as New York City Police Commissioner, during which he oversaw the police response to the September 11 attacks.

After the 2003 invasion of Iraq, President George W. Bush appointed Kerik as the interior minister of the Iraqi Coalition Provisional Authority. In 2004, Bush nominated Kerik to lead the Department of Homeland Security. However, Kerik soon withdrew his candidacy, explaining that he had employed an undocumented immigrant as a nanny. His admission sparked state and federal investigations. In 2006, Kerik pleaded guilty in Bronx Supreme Court to two unrelated misdemeanor ethics violations and was ordered to pay $221,000 in fines.

In 2009, Kerik pleaded guilty in the Southern District of New York to eight federal felony charges for tax fraud and making false statements. In February 2010, he was sentenced to four years in federal prison, of which he served three years. In 2020, he obtained a presidential pardon from President Donald Trump for his federal convictions for tax fraud, ethics violations, and criminal false statements. After the 2020 United States presidential election, Kerik supported Trump's false claims of voter fraud and attempted to help overturn the election results.

== Early life and education ==
Kerik was born in Newark, New Jersey, on September 4, 1955, the son of Patricia Joann (née Bailey) and Donald Raymond Kerik Sr. His mother was Irish American. His paternal grandfather was an ethnic Slovak who emigrated from Western Ukraine (then the Russian Empire) to a coal-mining town in Pennsylvania and changed his surname from Kapurik to Kerik.

Kerik was raised Catholic and grew up in Paterson, New Jersey. He attended Eastside High School in Paterson, and dropped out in 1972.

In July 1974, he enlisted in the United States Army and received a General Educational Development (GED) certificate from the State of North Carolina while assigned to Fort Bragg, North Carolina. After leaving the New York City Police Department, he received a B.S. in social theory, social structure and change, from Empire State College of the State University of New York in 2002.

== Career ==
=== Military ===
After dropping out of high school, Kerik enlisted in the U.S. Army and served in the Military Police, stationed in Korea.

=== Private sector ===
After leaving the Army, Kerik worked as a security expert in the Middle East; for a time, his clients included the Saudi royal family.

=== Law enforcement ===
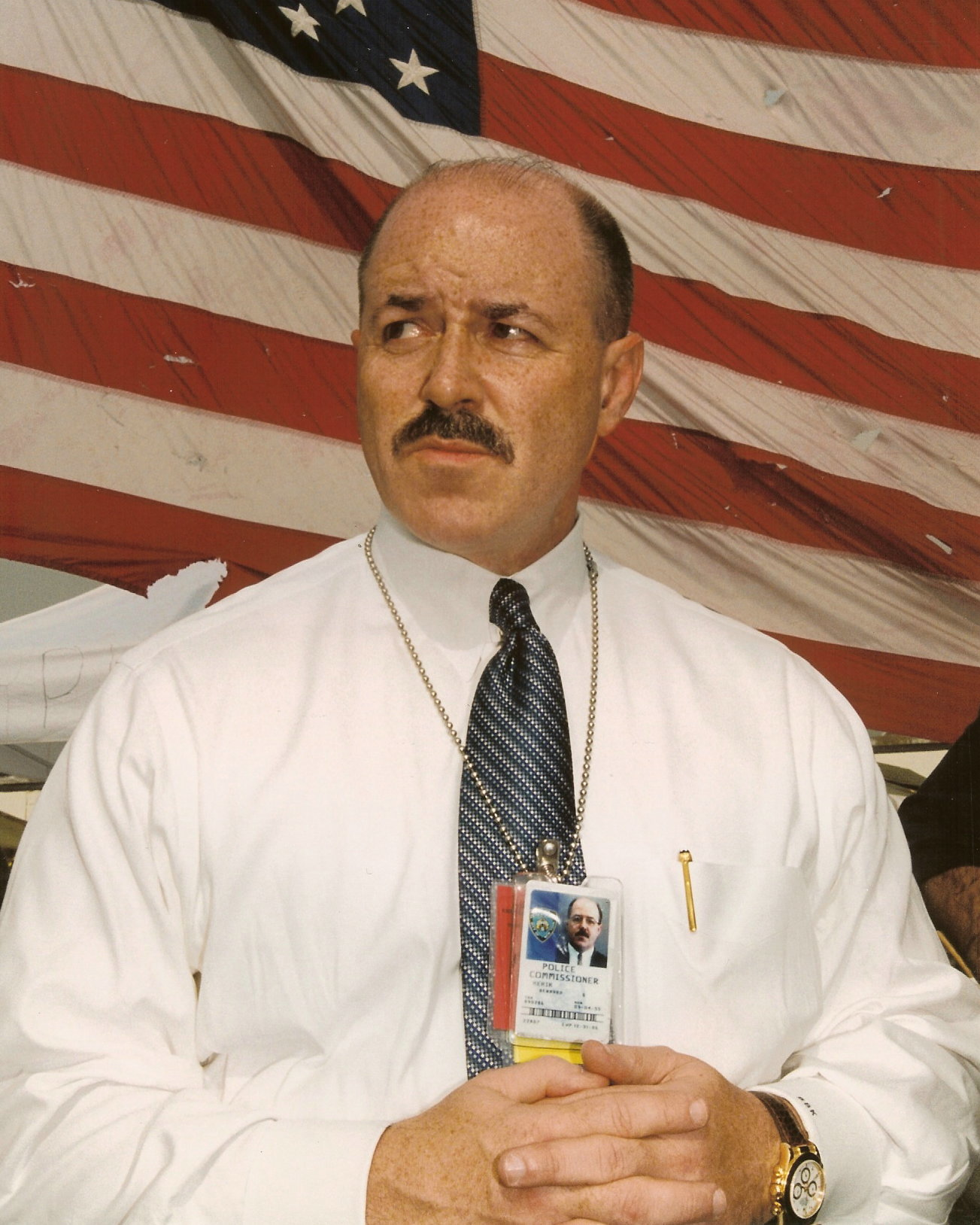
Kerik at press conference concerning crime scene evidence collection from the WTC site in 2001

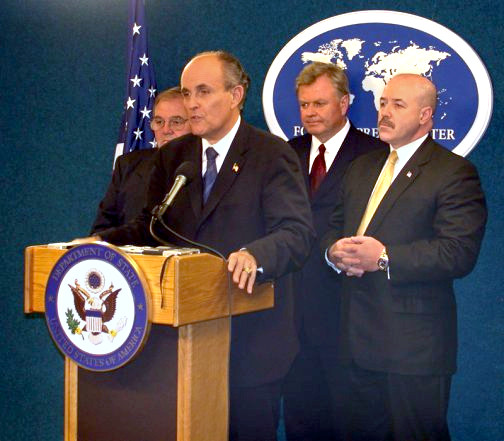
Kerik at the NYFPC briefing on "New York City – 1 Year After 9/11" with Rudy Giuliani, Richard Sheirer, and Thomas Von Essen in 2002

From December 1981 to October 1982 and then July 1984 to July 1986, Kerik worked at the Passaic County sheriff's office, in New Jersey. He served as the department's training officer and commander of special weapons and operations, and ultimately chief and warden of the Passaic County jail.

Kerik worked from 1982 to 1984 as chief of investigations for the security division of the King Faisal Specialist Hospital in Riyadh, Saudi Arabia. Six members of the hospital security staff, including Kerik, were fired and deported after an investigation in 1984 by the Saudi secret police. In his autobiography, Kerik wrote that he was expelled after a physical altercation with a Saudi secret police interrogator.

However, in 2004, after his nomination as Secretary of Homeland Security, nine former employees of the hospital told The Washington Post that Kerik worked with a hospital administrator (Nizar Feteih) to surveil people's private affairs, leading to a scandal partly based on Feteih's use of "the institution's security staff to track the private lives of several women with whom he was romantically involved, and men who came in contact with them." Kerik and Feteih (among others) were fired and Kerik deported.

Kerik joined the New York City Police Department in 1986. He first met Rudolph W. Giuliani in 1990, and during the 1993 New York City mayoral election campaign, served as Giuliani's bodyguard and driver. He joined the New York City Department of Corrections in 1994, and enjoyed a series of promotions with Giuliani's backing.

He was credited with reducing violence among the city's jail inmates. Giuliani appointed Kerik commissioner of the city Department of Corrections, a post he served in from 1998 to 2000.

Giuliani appointed Kerik the 40th Police Commissioner of New York City on August 21, 2000. Giuliani made the appointment against the advice of the outgoing police commissioner Howard Safir and many members of his own cabinet. Kerik's critics noted that he did not have a college degree, which at the time was a requirement for police officers to advance to the rank of captain and above.

As police commissioner, Kerik had a tense relationship with the FBI, in part because he criticized federal agencies for not sharing enough intelligence with local police. Although crime in New York dropped during Kerik's tenure, he was sometimes criticized for abuse of power. The New York Times reported that: "Behind the scenes Mr. Kerik ruled like a feudal lord. Moreover, many former employees have said he had taken up with a woman who was a correction officer; he was accused of directing officers to staff his wedding. He befriended the agency's inspector general, whose watchdog responsibilities require keeping an arms-length relationship, and the investigator attended his wedding."

On one occasion, Kerik sent homicide investigators to interview and fingerprint a number of Fox News employees whom Kerik's publisher, Judith Regan, suspected of stealing a necklace and mobile phone. During his time as police commissioner he made five arrests, including one involving two ex-convicts—one a paroled killer, wanted for a carjacking at gunpoint in Virginia—for allegedly driving a stolen van in Harlem.

Kerik was serving as police commissioner during the September 11 attacks. He was in his office when American Airlines Flight 11 hit the North Tower. He arrived at the base of the North Tower three minutes before United Airlines Flight 175 hit the South Tower, showering him and his staff with debris as Giuliani, Kerik, and their top aides were trapped inside a building at 75 Barclay Street. The September 11 attacks gave Kerik a national profile. Kerik served 16 months as commissioner, leaving office on December 31, 2001, at the end of Giuliani's term.

During a televised Fox News joint interview of himself and Giuliani with Jeanine Pirro on June 6, 2020, Kerik stated that "over the eight-year period that Giuliani was in office, we dropped the violent crime by 63 percent, dropped the murder [sic] by 70 [sic] overall in the city."

=== Return to private sector ===
Following his departure from the New York City Police Department, he was employed by Giuliani Partners, a consulting firm formed by Giuliani. He was the senior vice president at Giuliani Partners and chief executive officer of Giuliani–Kerik LLC, an affiliate of Giuliani Partners. Kerik resigned from these positions in December 2004. In March 2005 he created The Kerik Group LLC, where he served as chairman until June 2009, consulting in crisis management and risk mitigation, counterterrorism and law enforcement, and jail/prison management strategies.

He served as an adviser and consultant to King Abdullah II of the Hashemite Kingdom of Jordan and to President Bharrat Jagdeo of the Republic of Guyana. He oversaw threat and vulnerability assessments for a ruling family in the United Arab Emirates and also worked on crime reduction and national security strategies in Trinidad and Tobago.

=== Interim Minister of Interior of Iraq ===
In May 2003, during Operation Iraqi Freedom, Kerik was appointed by the George W. Bush administration as interim Interior Minister of the Coalition Provisional Authority, the governing body of occupied Iraq, and senior policy adviser to U.S. presidential envoy to Iraq, Paul Bremer. When Kerik arrived in Iraq, the Ministry of Interior did not exist, having collapsed and dissolved during the U.S.–led coalition's invasion of Iraq. Kerik was responsible for restructuring and rebuilding the ministry and all its constituent parts: the national police, intelligence service, and border and customs police, as well as choosing the officials who would take control of these institutions when he left.

Prior to Kerik's departure from Iraq on September 2, 2003, more than 35,000 Iraqi police were reinstated, 35 police stations were placed in Baghdad, with several more around the country, senior deputy interior ministers were appointed, and the newly established governing council appointed the first Iraqi minister of interior, post–Saddam Hussein, Nuri Badran. A United Nations UNODC fact-finding mission report dated May 18, 2003, at the beginning of his term, noted that Kerik's team made "positive interventions in a number of areas."

During his tenure as Interior Minister of Iraq, Kerik secretly accepted and failed to report a $250,000 interest-free "loan" from Israeli billionaire Eitan Wertheimer, for which he was later indicted by the U.S. government and sentenced to prison.

=== Nomination as U.S. Secretary of Homeland Security ===
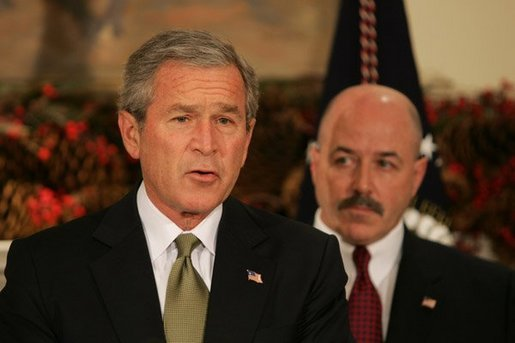
President George W. Bush announcing Kerik's nomination to be the Secretary of Homeland Security in 2004

On December 3, 2004, Kerik was nominated by President Bush to succeed Tom Ridge as United States Secretary of Homeland Security. Incoming Attorney General Alberto Gonzales vetted Kerik during that nomination period. On December 10, after a week of press scrutiny, Kerik withdrew acceptance of the nomination. Kerik stated that he had unknowingly hired an undocumented worker as a nanny and housekeeper. Similar violations of immigration law had previously caused the withdrawal of the nominations of Linda Chavez as secretary of labor by George W. Bush and of Zoë Baird and Kimba Wood for attorney general by President Bill Clinton.

Shortly after withdrawing his name from consideration, Kerik became the target of a New York State grand jury investigation by the Bronx District Attorney's Office, and later, the United States Attorney's Office.

== Criminal investigation and convictions ==
On November 8, 2007, Kerik was indicted by a federal grand jury in White Plains, New York on charges of tax fraud and making false statements to the federal government about the $250,000 he received from Wertheimer. Prosecutors further accused Kerik of receiving about $236,000 from New York real estate mogul Steven C. Witkoff between 2001 and 2003. Some of the New York charges were dropped in December 2008, but Kerik was then re-indicted on the same charges in Washington, D.C.

February 2020 pardon granted by Donald Trump

On November 5, 2009, Kerik pleaded guilty to eight felony tax and false statement charges, specifically two counts of tax fraud, one count of making a false statement on a loan application, and five counts of making false statements. He was sentenced to 48 months in federal prison and three years' supervised release (probation). Kerik was represented by criminal defense attorney Michael F. Bachner. He surrendered to the U.S. minimum security prison camp in Cumberland, Maryland, on May 17, 2010. He was discharged from federal custody on October 15, 2013, and after serving five months' home confinement, his supervised release concluded in October 2016.

Kerik was granted a presidential pardon for his federal convictions by President Donald Trump on February 18, 2020.

== 2020 presidential election ==
On November 7, 2020, following the 2020 United States presidential election, Kerik stood behind Giuliani, then Trump's personal lawyer, during the Four Seasons Total Landscaping press conference in Philadelphia, Pennsylvania.

Shortly after Joe Biden's victory over Trump in the 2020 United States presidential election, Kerik claimed to have evidence of widespread voter fraud, falsely claiming that Trump had actually won the election.

On December 31, 2021, Kerik forwarded a letter to the United States House Select Committee on the January 6 Attack holding hearings regarding the 2021 Capitol riot indicating his conditional willingness to testify as to his knowledge of that event. He provided documents that included the outline of a strategy to overturn the election, and his involvement in securing space at the Willard Hotel, nearby the Capitol, for the Trump team's "war room" and the Kerrick firm's billing of over $55,000 for rooms there for legal personnel, plus $10,000 in travel expenses.

Among the documents was a "strategic communications plan" proposed for the "GIULIANI PRESIDENTIAL LEGAL DEFENSE TEAM", 22 pages long, envisioning a 10-day blitz, outlining a campaign intended to persuade Republican Congressional members, in particular swing-state senators and representatives, to vote against certification of the 2020 election results. It recommended promoting negative characterizations of the conduct of the election employing such terminology as, "Fraudulent Ballots", "Dead people voted", and "Underage people voted". The senators specifically targeted included Pat Toomey from Pennsylvania and Ron Johnson from Wisconsin, and representatives from their states plus Arizona, Georgia, Michigan and, from Nevada, Mark Amodei.

Among the documents Kerik provided was one sent by Giuliani associate Maria Ryan. She had received a proposed plan from QAnon conspiracy circulator Ron Watkins on November 11, 2020, which was meant to facilitate the overturning of the election. She forwarded it the next day to her team member Kerik. Watkins stated he had discovered "weak points" in voting machines manufactured by Dominion Voting Systems.

Ryan forwarded to Ron Watkins the Kerik offer to help overturn the election. The Watkins plan for Trump to remain in office incorporated what was termed an "astroturfing cult". The instruments for effectuating the plan were to utilize an army of social media MAGA posters and gathering protests outside the homes of lawmakers as a means of intimidation.

Kerik's attorney Tim Parlatore confirmed in August 2023 that his client was one of thirty unindicted co-conspirators referenced in the Fulton County, Georgia, indictment of former president Donald Trump and eighteen other named co-conspirators. Kerik was alleged to have spoken with politicians in Pennsylvania and Arizona regarding the fake electors scheme following the 2020 presidential election that Trump lost.

== Awards and honors ==
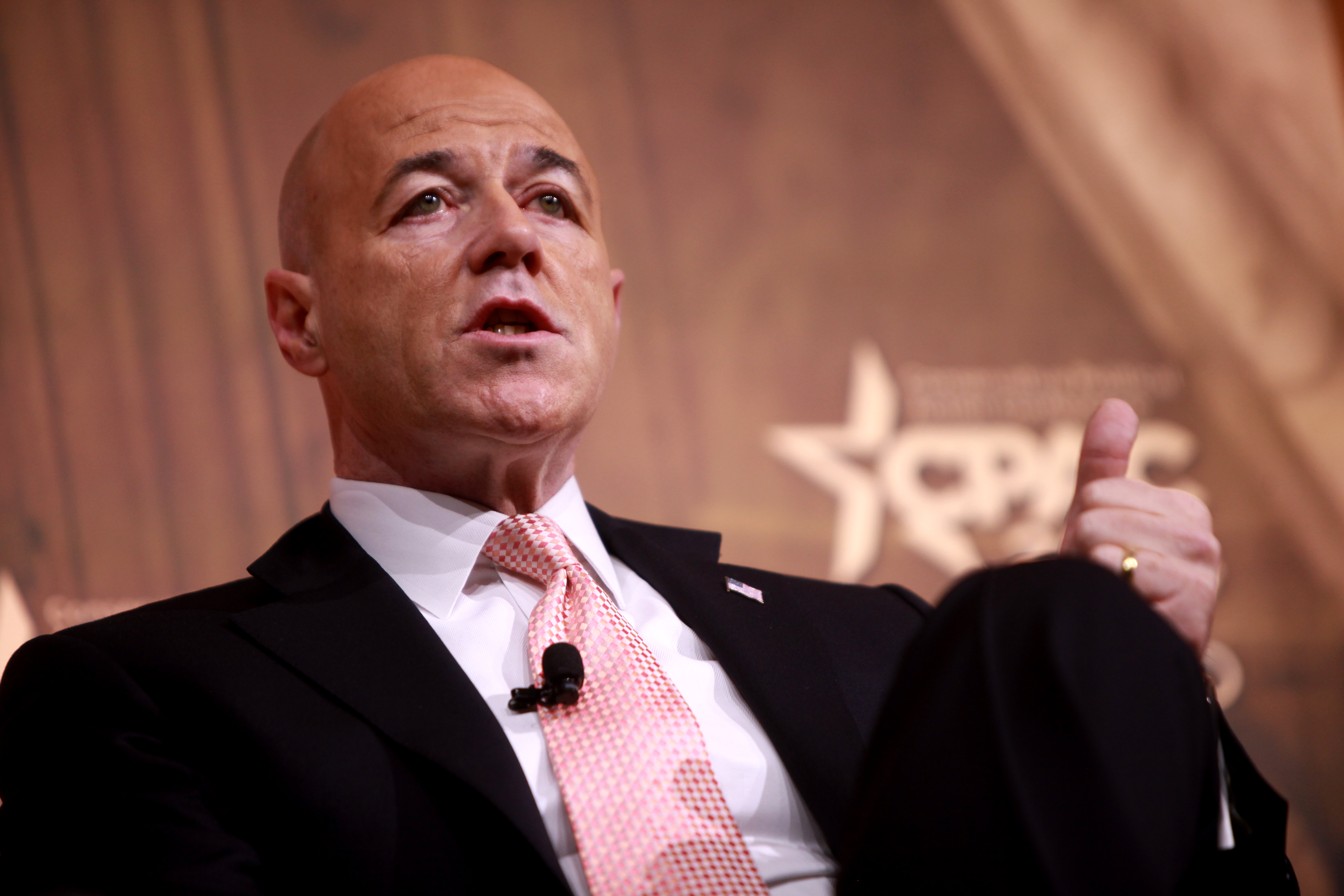
Kerik at CPAC in 2014

Kerik earned 30 NYPD medals for excellent, meritorious, and heroic service, including the New York City Police Department Medal for Valor for his involvement in a gun battle in which his partner was shot and wounded and he and his team members returned fire. As a result of his work on and in the aftermath of the September 11 attacks, he was honored by Her Majesty Queen Elizabeth II with an honorary appointment as Commander of the Most Excellent Order of the British Empire (CBE).

Kerik received honorary doctorates from Michigan State University, New York Institute of Technology, Manhattanville College, College of New Rochelle, and Iona College, and he received the President's Medal from Hunter College.

== Personal life and death ==
Kerik's first child, a girl, was born in October 1975 when he was 20 and serving in South Korea as a military policeman. In February 1976, Kerik completed his tour of duty in South Korea and abandoned his daughter and her mother. Her mother emigrated to the U.S. and married an American. She learned of Kerik's life decades later when she saw him on television and notified their daughter of his location. Kerik wrote in his autobiography that the episode was "a mistake I will always regret, and I pray to God that one day I can make it right."

Kerik was married three times. His first marriage was in August 1978; he and his wife were divorced in 1983. Kerik's second marriage lasted from September 1983 to July 1992; the marriage produced a son. Kerik's third marriage took place in 1998, and the couple had two daughters.

Kerik conducted two extramarital affairs simultaneously, using a Battery Park City apartment that had been set aside for first responders at Ground Zero.

In 2001 Kerik published a memoir, The Lost Son: A Life in Pursuit of Justice, a New York Times best-seller.

In March 2015, Kerik published his second book, From Jailer to Jailed: My Journey from Correction and Police Commissioner to Inmate 84888-054, documenting the 13 prior years of his life including his incarceration and personal observations of the U.S. criminal justice system.

Kerik was close friends starting in 1995 with Larry Ray, who was later accused of running a sex cult at Sarah Lawrence College. Ray donated $7,000 to help pay for Kerik's November 1998 wedding and reception, and was the best man at Kerik's wedding. Shortly after, Kerik helped Ray obtain a job as security director with a construction company run by Frank DiTommaso and his brother known as Interstate Industrial Corporation, where a portion of Ray's responsibility was to assist the business in obtaining a license from city regulators, as the business faced allegations that it was tied to organized crime. In 2000, Ray and Kerik had a falling out, around the time that Ray was indicted for racketeering, and Ray began to cooperate as a cooperating witness with prosecutors who were investigating Kerik, and whose investigation ultimately led to Kerik being convicted and imprisoned. In 2019 Kerik said: "Larry Ray is a psychotic con man who has victimized every friend he's ever had. It's been close to 20 years since I last heard from him, yet his reign of terror continues." In 2022, Ray was convicted of extortion, forced prostitution, and forced labor, and sentenced to 60 years in prison.

Kerik died from a heart ailment at a Manhattan hospital, on May 29, 2025, at the age of 69. He was also previously treated for skin cancer.

== See also ==
- Unsuccessful nominations to the Cabinet of the United States
- List of people pardoned or granted clemency by the president of the United States

Police appointments
Preceded by Howard Safir	Police Commissioner of New York City; 2000–2001	Succeeded by Raymond Kelly
Political offices
Preceded by Mahmud Dhiyab	Minister of the Interior of Iraq; Acting; 2003	Succeeded by Nuri Badran
