= Joseph Esposito =

American police officer (1950–2024)

Joseph J. Esposito
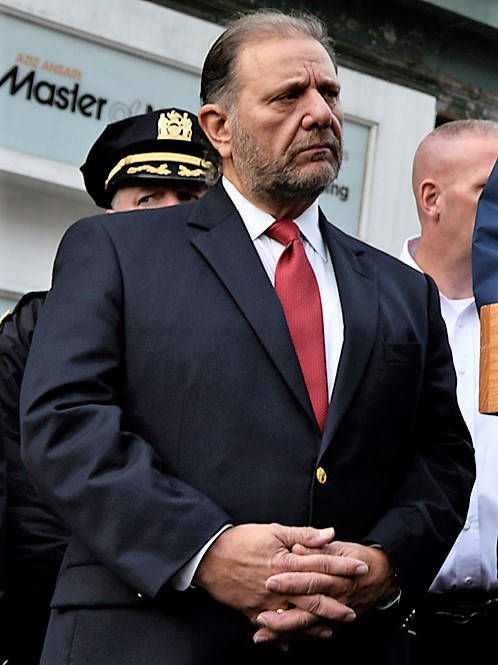
- Esposito in 2015

Deputy Commissioner of Enforcement for the New York City Department of Buildings
- In office September 3, 2022 – January 8, 2024
- Commissioner: Eric Ulrich; James Oddo
- Preceded by: Timothy Hogan

Commissioner of New York City Emergency Management
- In office June 27, 2014 – November 30, 2018
- Mayor: Bill de Blasio
- Preceded by: Joseph F. Bruno
- Succeeded by: Deanne Criswell

Chief of the New York City Police Department
- In office August 25, 2000 – March 27, 2013
- Commissioner: Bernard B. Kerik; Raymond W. Kelly
- Preceded by: Joseph Dunne
- Succeeded by: Phillip Banks III

Personal details
- Born: March 28, 1950 New York City, U.S.
- Died: January 8, 2024 (aged 73) Mineola, New York, U.S.
- Profession: Police officer
- Police career
- Department: New York City Police Department
- Service years: 1968–2013
- Rank: Chief of Department
- Awards: NYPD Combat Cross; NYPD Medal for Valor; NYPD Exceptional Merit

Joseph John Esposito (March 28, 1950 – January 8, 2024) was an American police officer, who served as Deputy Commissioner of Enforcement for the New York City Department of Buildings, Commissioner of New York City Emergency Management from 2014 to 2018, and Chief of the New York City Police Department from 2000 to 2013. Esposito was the longest-serving Chief of Department in NYPD history, much of his tenure being under Raymond Kelly, who was the longest-serving Police Commissioner in NYPD history.

== Background ==
Joseph J. Esposito was born on March 28, 1950, in Brooklyn. He earned a Bachelor of Arts degree in Criminal Justice from the State University of New York.

Esposito died in Mineola, New York, on January 8, 2024, at the age of 73 from brain cancer.

== Career ==
Esposito entered the NYPD in August 1968 at 18 years old as a Police Trainee. In April 1971, he was appointed a Patrolman, and began his career on patrol in the 77th Precinct in Brooklyn. He was promoted to Detective in May 1983, Sergeant in September 1983, Lieutenant in February 1986, Captain in June 1989, Deputy Inspector in August 1993, Inspector in August 1994, Deputy Chief in September 1996, and Assistant Chief in December 1997. On August 25, 2000, he was promoted to the position of Chief of Department, making him the highest-ranking uniformed member of the department. In his career, Esposito served in numerous commands of the department, including the 77th, 10th, 83rd, 109th, 34th, 66th, and 83rd Precincts, and in the Narcotics Division and the Detective Bureau. In his last assignment before becoming Chief of Department, Esposito was the Commanding Officer of the Strategic and Tactical Command (S.A.T.COM) Brooklyn North. As Chief of Department, Esposito directed and controlled the daily operations of the five major enforcement Bureaus (Patrol Services, Detectives, Transit, Housing, and Organized Crime Control) within the NYPD. He also coordinated the crime control strategy meetings at which commanders share tactical information and recommend plans of action for realizing crime reduction goals. During his career, he earned some of the department's most honored and prestigious awards, including the Combat Cross, the Medal for Valor, and the Exceptional Merit award.

Esposito led the NYPD response to the September 11th attacks. Years later in an interview with WNBC, he described the attacks as the most haunting moment of his career.

During President George W. Bush’s famous visit to Ground Zero days after the attacks, Esposito could be seen amongst the NYPD and FDNY members surrounding the president.

== Controversies ==
In April 2006, New York State Senator Simcha Felder accused Esposito of using inappropriate language when Esposito attempted to quell individuals who entered a police station house during a riot in Borough Park. Felder indicated that he personally heard the chief say, "Get the fucking Jews out of here." However, the Civilian Complaint Review Board, which investigates police misconduct, later found the accusation against Esposito unsubstantiated, but did reprimand Chief Esposito for using profanity. When subsequently asked to comment on the Review Board's finding, Felder's office stated that Felder had "no comment" about the incident and that he "wants to put the matter behind him".

In 2011, Esposito directed the arrests of hundreds of Occupy Wall Street protesters during a march across the Brooklyn Bridge. In the civil litigation that followed, Esposito tried to avoid being deposed in one of the related cases.

In a video taken on St. Patrick's Day in 2012 and later obtained by the Daily News, Esposito was seen shoving protesters and, at least once, using a nightstick to strike a protester.

In September 2012, Esposito was photographed while restraining a slim-build female Occupy Wall Street activist. The photograph was noted in the Letters to the Editor section of the Daily News, since it appeared that Esposito had placed the activist into a "chokehold."

== Dates of rank ==
Sworn in as a Police Trainee – 1968
Appointed a Patrolman – 1971
Promoted to Detective – 1983
Promoted to Sergeant – 1983
Promoted to Lieutenant – 1986
Promoted to Captain – 1989
Promoted to Deputy Inspector – 1993
Promoted to Inspector – 1994
Promoted to Deputy Chief – 1996
Promoted to Assistant Chief – 1997
Chief of Department – 2000

== See also ==
- New York City Police Department
- Chief of Police

Political offices
| Preceded by Joseph F. Bruno | Commissioner, NYC Office of Emergency Management; 2014–2018 | Succeeded by Deanne Criswell |
Police appointments
| Preceded by Joseph Dunne | NYPD Chief of Department; 2000–2013 | Succeeded by Phillip Banks III |
