= Carlos M. Rivera =

Commissioner of the New York City Fire Department (1934–2020)

- Born: 1934; New York City, New York
- Died: October 12, 2020 (aged 86)
- Occupations: FDNY Commissioner; 1990-1993
- Spouse: Joan Rivera

Carlos M. Rivera (1934 – October 12, 2020) was the first Hispanic commissioner in the New York City Fire Department's 127-year history. He was appointed the 27th Fire Commissioner of the City of New York by Mayor David Dinkins on January 1, 1990 and served in that position until his resignation on August 31, 1993.

== Career ==
Rivera's parents moved from Puerto Rico to New York City, where he was born in 1934. There Rivera received his primary and secondary education. He joined the New York City Fire Department on July 23, 1958 and worked his way up in the department serving in various leadership positions. Initially he served in the Bronx, but moved to Manhattan after his promotion to lieutenant in 1964. On January 1, 1990, New York City Mayor David N. Dinkins named Rivera the 27th commissioner of the New York City Fire Department. As commissioner he was responsible for that departments $634 million budget. He was also responsible for the 11,500 firefighters under his command. During the 1993 World Trade Center bombing, Rivera was in charge of the response of the fire department.

Rivera resigned on August 31, 1993, stating that "Family reasons and health considerations" was the reason for his decision. However, it is believed that Rivera was under pressure from the moment he was appointed, in December 1989, as the Dinkins administration tried to hold down costs citywide.

Rivera died on October 12, 2020, aged 86.

== See also ==
- List of Puerto Ricans
- New York City Fire Commissioner

Fire appointments
Preceded by Joseph F. Bruno	FDNY Commissioner; 1990–1993	Succeeded by William M. Feehan
