= Notify NYC =

Opt-in emergency alert system

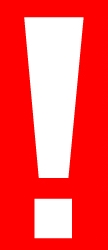
Notify NYC

Notify NYC is the City of New York's official source for information about emergency events and important City services. It is a free service launched by the NYC Emergency Management and New York City Department of Information Technology and Telecommunications (DoITT) in 2007, allowing users to receive alerts through various communications devices, such as cell phones, landlines, email, Twitter, and RSS. Users can specify which alerts they would like to receive, and determine their specific location of interest with zip codes. Registration is free and simple. Notify NYC services residents and visitors to all five boroughs of the City of New York: Manhattan, Brooklyn, Queens, Staten Island, and the Bronx.

Sponsored by New York City Emergency Management (NYCEM) and the Department of Information Technology & Telecommunications (DoITT), Notify NYC was launched in May 2007 as a four-area pilot program. Participants provided feedback through surveys, customer service emails and calls to 3-1-1. Based on feedback from the original pilot, the first phase of Notify NYC services was launched citywide on May 28, 2009, offering free access to a variety of alert and notification services.

Notify NYC has extended its capability, allowing for any New York City agency to send out group-specific alerts and notifications. Interested candidates can contact Notify NYC to develop this free service for their agency. As of January 1, 2010, Notify NYC has partnered with the New York City Department of Education (DOE) to provide expanded information on school delays, closings, and early dismissals. To receive school notifications and alerts, users must add the address of their child's school, to their areas of interest in account settings. School addresses can be found by visiting the Department of Education website.

Users can view real time messages on the website with options to view it in different languages, which enables them to stay up to date and alert.

In 2011 a service for emergency notifications to mobile phones was announced. In September 2017, the City got its first emergency notification mobile application, which can be downloaded by smart phone users on Apple's App Store and Google Play for real time updates. These updates include both natural disasters such as storm warnings, as well as traffic updates and public health and missing person alerts.
