= Jerome Hauer =

American businessman (1951–2023)

Jerome M. Hauer
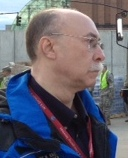
- Hauer in 2012

Commissioner, NYS Division of Homeland Security and Emergency Services
- In office October 2011 – December 2014
- Appointed by: Andrew M. Cuomo
- Succeeded by: John Melville

Director, NYC Office of Emergency Management
- In office February, 1996 – February 2000
- Appointed by: Rudolph Giuliani
- Succeeded by: Richard J. Sheirer

Personal details
- Born: October 31, 1951 New York City, U.S.
- Died: August 11, 2023 (aged 71) Alexandria, Virginia, U.S.

Jerome Maurice Hauer (October 31, 1951 – August 11, 2023) was an American businessman who was the chief executive officer of a consulting firm, The Hauer Group LLC. He also held several governmental positions related to emergency management in the states of New York and Indiana. Hauer also worked as a member of the Hollis-Eden Pharmaceuticals board of directors. Hauer served as New York State's Commissioner of Homeland Security and Emergency Services from October 2011 until December 2014. He was born in New York City.

On September 11, 2001, Jerome Hauer was a national security advisor with the Department of Health and Human Services, and a managing director with Kroll Associates.

== Career ==
Hauer was the director of the Indiana Department of Emergency Management from 1989 to 1993 during the gubernatorial administration of Evan Bayh. Hauer joined IBM in 1993 to manage programs for Hazardous Materials Response and Crisis Management and Fire Safety. For his production of related training videos he received the International Film and TV Critics of New York Bronze award in 1996. In the early 1990s he received a master's degree in emergency medical services from the Johns Hopkins University School of Hygiene and Public Health (now known as the Johns Hopkins School of Public Health) and later became a member of the Johns Hopkins Working Group on Civilian Bio Defense. He wrote several articles on possible bio terrorist attacks.

Hauer was the first director of Mayor Giuliani's Office of Emergency Management when Giuliani shifted responsibility for the city's emergency preparedness from the police department to the new agency. In his OEM role, Giuliani made the decision to open an emergency operations command center at 7 World Trade Center. The center was destroyed when the 47-story tower collapsed at about 5:25 p.m. on 9–11. He left the role in 2000.

Hauer was the acting assistant secretary for the Office of Public Health Emergency Preparedness (OPHP) within the US Department of Health and Human Services (DHHS) from 2002 to 2004. He was appointed by HHS Secretary Tommy Thompson on May 5, 2002, and served until replaced on April 28, 2004. In this role, Hauer was responsible for coordinating the country's medical and public health preparedness and response to emergencies, including acts of biological, chemical and nuclear terrorism.

== Death ==
Hauer died of prostate cancer on August 11, 2023.

Government offices
Preceded by	New York State Division of Homeland Security and Emergency Services; 2011–2014	Succeeded by John Melville
New office	Director, NYC Office of Emergency Management; 1996–2000	Succeeded by Richard Sheirer
