= Thomas von Essen =

30th FDNY Commissioner of New York City

Thomas von Essen CBE
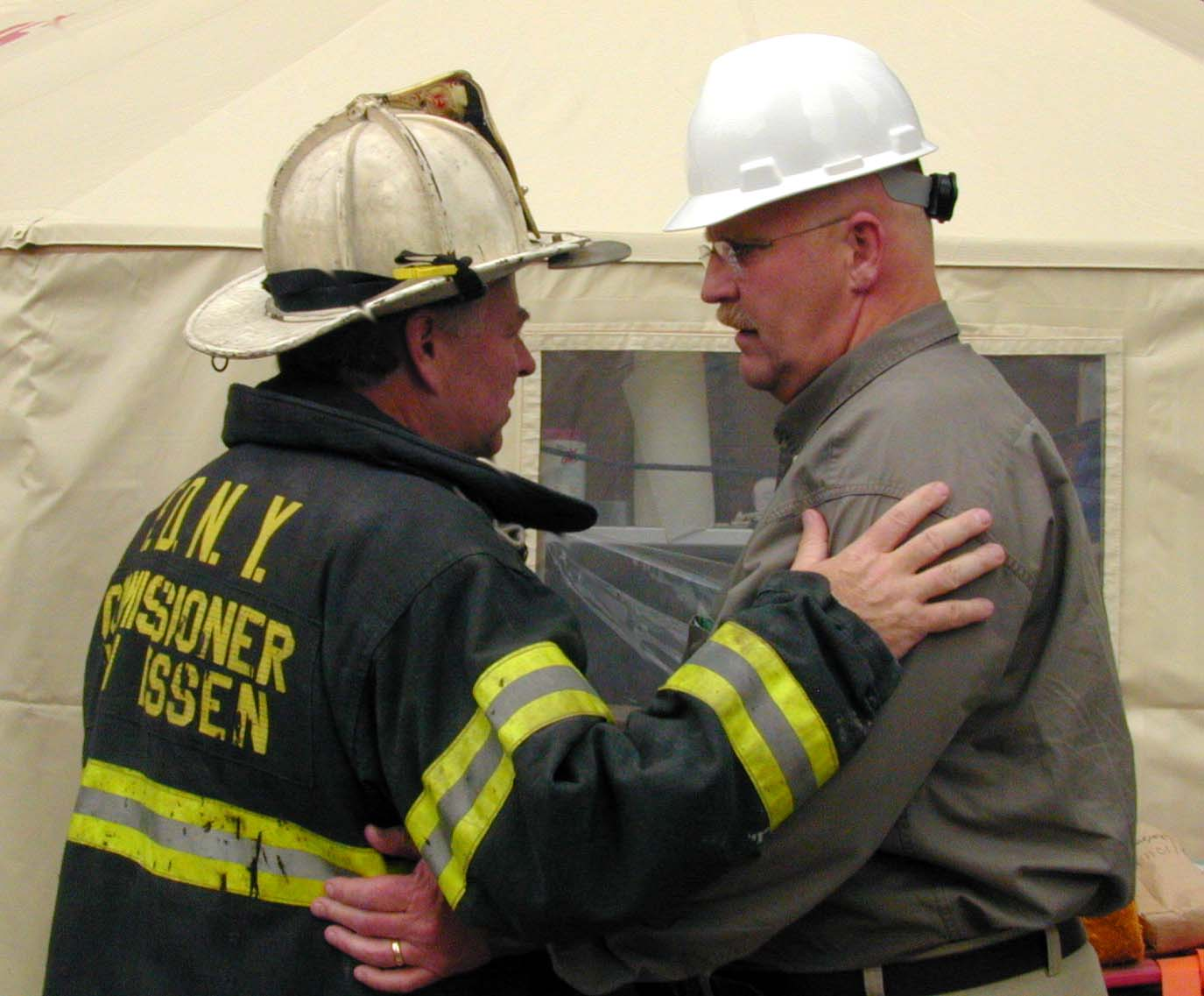
- with FEMA director Joe M. Allbaugh near Ground Zero, September 18, 2001

30th New York City Fire Commissioner
- In office April 15, 1996 – December 31, 2001
- Mayor: Rudolph W. Giuliani
- Preceded by: Howard Safir
- Succeeded by: Nicholas Scoppetta

Personal details
- Born: 1945 (age 80–81) Brooklyn, New York, U.S.

Thomas von Essen (born 1945 in Brooklyn, New York) was appointed the 30th New York City Fire Commissioner of the City of New York by Mayor Rudy Giuliani on April 15, 1996, and served in that position until the end of the Giuliani administration on December 31, 2001, nearly four months after the September 11 attacks.

== Education ==
Von Essen attended John Adams High School in Ozone Park, New York and is a graduate of St. Francis College, class of 1972.

== Career ==
Following two years of active duty in the U.S. Navy serving aboard a submarine based in New London, von Essen entered the FDNY's "proby school" in May 1970 and was assigned to Ladder 42 in the Bronx, where he spent most of his firefighting career. In 1993, von Essen was elected President of the Uniformed Firefighters Association, the largest firefighters’ union in the nation, representing the FDNY’s rank and file firefighters. He spent nearly three years as president of the Uniformed Firefighters Association.

=== September 11, 2001 ===
Von Essen was the Commissioner for the New York City Fire Department when the September 11 attacks on the World Trade Center took place. He personally went to the Twin Towers to oversee evacuations by his department following the arrival of the first units there with 1st Battalion Chief Joseph W. Pfeifer and the companies with him, who were investigating a report of a smell of gas only a few blocks away when American Airlines Flight 11, piloted by Mohamed Atta, crashed into the North Tower, followed 17 minutes later by United Airlines Flight 175, piloted by Marwan al-Shehhi, crashing into the South Tower.

Von Essen and his men evacuated as many people as they could until the South Tower collapsed 56 minutes after it was hit, at which point Chief Pfeifer ordered all personnel to evacuate the North Tower before it collapsed. Von Essen escaped the collapse of the Twin Towers, and continued to serve as FDNY Commissioner until Mayor Rudy Giuliani's term ended in December 2001, by which time von Essen wanted to preserve the accounts of the FDNY's members "before they became reshaped by a collective memory." According to Jim Dwyer of The New York Times, the FDNY oral histories were "originally gathered on the order of Thomas Von Essen, the city fire commissioner on Sept. 11, who said he wanted to preserve those accounts before they became reshaped by a collective memory." The oral histories constitute about 12,000 pages of testimony by 503 FDNY firefighters, emergency medical technicians and paramedics collected from early October, 2001 to late January, 2002.

Von Essen's act has provided a significant body of narrative material. Most prominent of which were observations of the beginning of the towers collapsing. Thomas von Essen was succeeded by Nicholas Scoppetta as FDNY Commissioner under new Mayor Michael Bloomberg.

== Retirement from FDNY ==
Following his retirement from the FDNY, von Essen served as a Senior Vice-president at Giuliani Partners and chief executive officer of Giuliani-Von Essen LLC.

In October 2017, von Essen was named FEMA Regional Administrator for Region II in New York City by President Donald Trump.

== Awards ==
In 2002 he was made an Honorary Commander of the Order of the British Empire (CBE) by Queen Elizabeth II.

== Publications ==
- Van Essen, Thomas; Murray, Matt (August 1, 2002). Strong Of Heart. Life And Death In The Fire Department Of New York. New York, New York: William Morrow and Company. ISBN 978-0060509491.

== Personal life ==
Von Essen is a member of the Essen family, who are part of the German and Swedish nobility. He grew up in both Bushwick, Brooklyn and Ozone Park, Queens.

He and his wife, Rita, have four children. Their youngest is actor, singer, and Tony Award nominee Max von Essen.

Fire appointments
Preceded by Howard Safir	FDNY Commissioner; 1996–2001	Succeeded by Nicholas Scoppetta
