= Joseph E. Spinnato =

Joseph E. Spinnato (born October 24, 1938) was appointed Acting Fire Commissioner of the City of New York by Mayor Edward I. Koch on October 22, 1982, upon the resignation of Fire Commissioner Charles J. Hynes, and was appointed the 25th Fire Commissioner on February 17, 1983. He served in that position until his resignation on October 20, 1987. He continues to be active in public life and has held several governmental positions since.

Fire appointments
Preceded by Charles J. Hynes	FDNY Commissioner; 1982–1987	Succeeded by Joseph F. Bruno
