= Nuri Badran =

Iraqi politician

Nuri al-Badran (born 1943) was the Minister of Interior in the cabinet appointed by the Interim Iraq Governing Council in September 2003. A secular Shiite Muslim, Badran served in the government of Saddam Hussein as ambassador to the Soviet Union until fleeing Iraq upon its 1990 invasion of Kuwait. In exile, he joined the Iraqi National Accord opposition group (led by his brother-in-law Ayad Allawi). Badran resigned his post in April 2004 amid a corruption scandal.

Political offices
Preceded by Bernard Kerik (Coalition Provisional Authority)	Iraqi Minister of Interior; September 2003 – April 2004	Succeeded by Samir Sumaidaie
