= Feehan =

Feehan is an Irish surname. Notable people with the name include:

- Christine Feehan, American romance-paranormal writer
- Harold Feehan (1895–1979), Australian rules footballer
- Jimmy Feehan (born 1995), Irish Gaelic footballer
- John Feehan (born 1946), Irish geologist, botanist, author and broadcaster
- John M. Feehan (1916–1991), Irish author and publisher
- Patrick Feehan (1829–1902), American Catholic bishop
- Paul M. Feehan, Irish mathematician
- Richard Feehan (born 1960), Canadian politician from Alberta
- Sonny Feehan (1926–1995), Irish footballer
- Tim Feehan (born 1957), Canadian singer-songwriter
- William M. Feehan (1929–2001), American firefighter; member of the Fire Department of New York
