= New York City Police Museum =

Museum in Manhattan, New York

- Established: 1999
- Website: www.nycpm.org
- First Police Precinct Station House
- U.S. National Register of Historic Places
- New York State Register of Historic Places
- New York City Landmark
- Location: 100 Old Slip, New York, NY 10005
- Coordinates: 40°42′12″N 74°00′31″W
- Area: less than one acre
- Built: 1909
- Architects: Hunt & Hunt
- Architectural style: Late 19th And 20th Century Revivals
- NRHP reference No.: 82001193
- NYSRHP No.: 06101.001696
- NYCL No.: 0968

Significant dates
- Added to NRHP: October 29, 1982
- Designated NYSRHP: September 22, 1982
- Designated NYCL: September 20, 1977

The New York City Police Museum (NYCPM) is a museum about the history and contributions of the New York City Police Department. Founded in 1999, the museum is located in Lower Manhattan in New York City. While one of the museum's primary focuses is a memorial to the September 11 attacks, the museum contains a wide range of information on the history of the NYPD. It also allows visitors to simulate a police firefight, and judges whether or not the shooting was correct, allowing civilians to have some understanding of situations that police face.

== Planning ==
On February 16, 1998, plans for a police museum were unveiled when then-Police Commissioner Howard Safir and the Alliance for Downtown New York (the local Business improvement district) made $5 million available for the museum in return for a new police substation in Lower Manhattan. Funding for the museum was criticized and classified by some as the buying of police protection for a given area at the expense of another that could not afford to broker a similar deal. As a result, Mayor Rudy Giuliani cancelled the funding for the museum two days later. In March of the same year, the New York City Police Museum non-profit corporation was created, and in April 1999, the museum opened, although the official unveiling was not held until January 19, 2000.

== Collection and programming ==
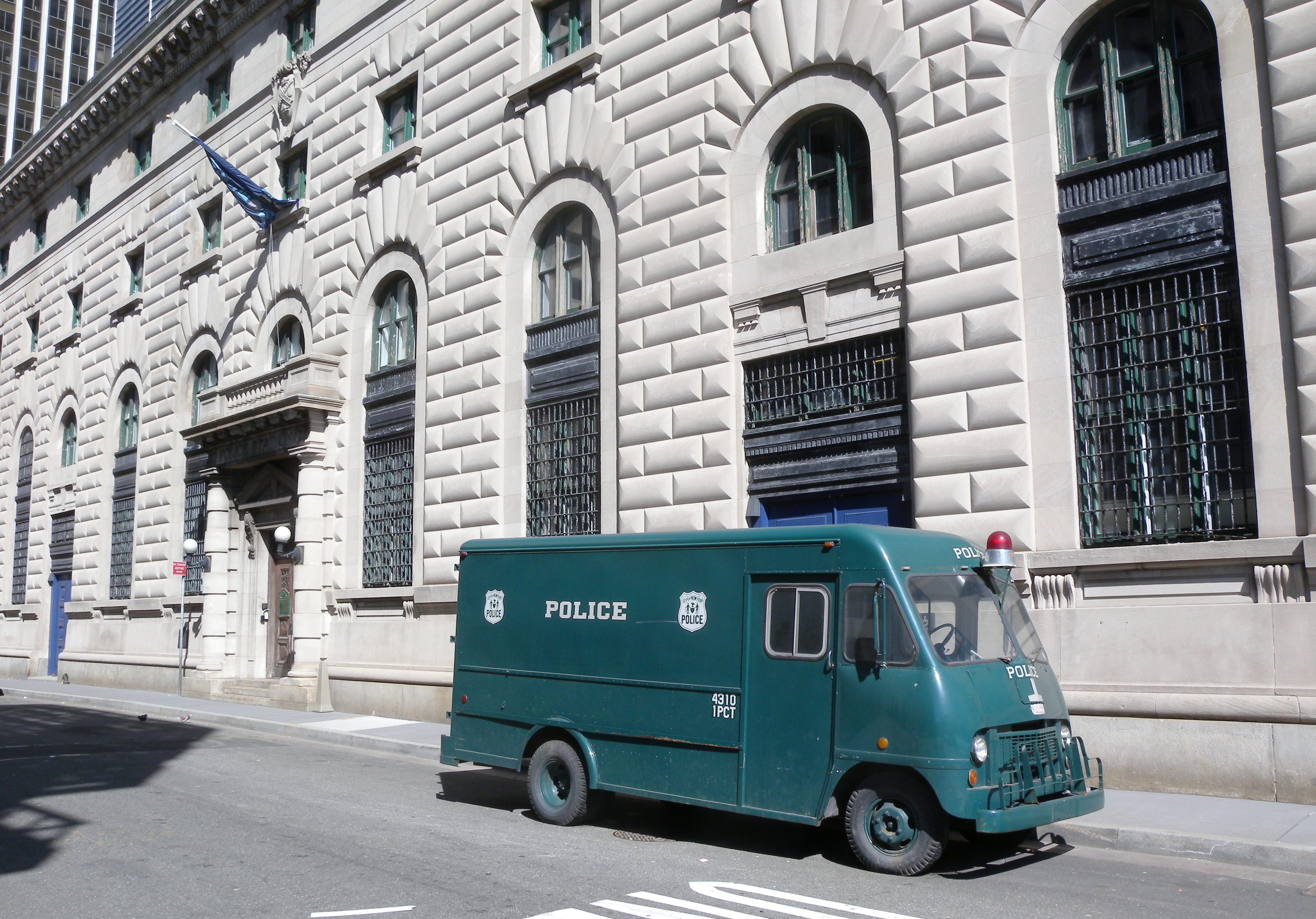
Patrol Wagon on display outside

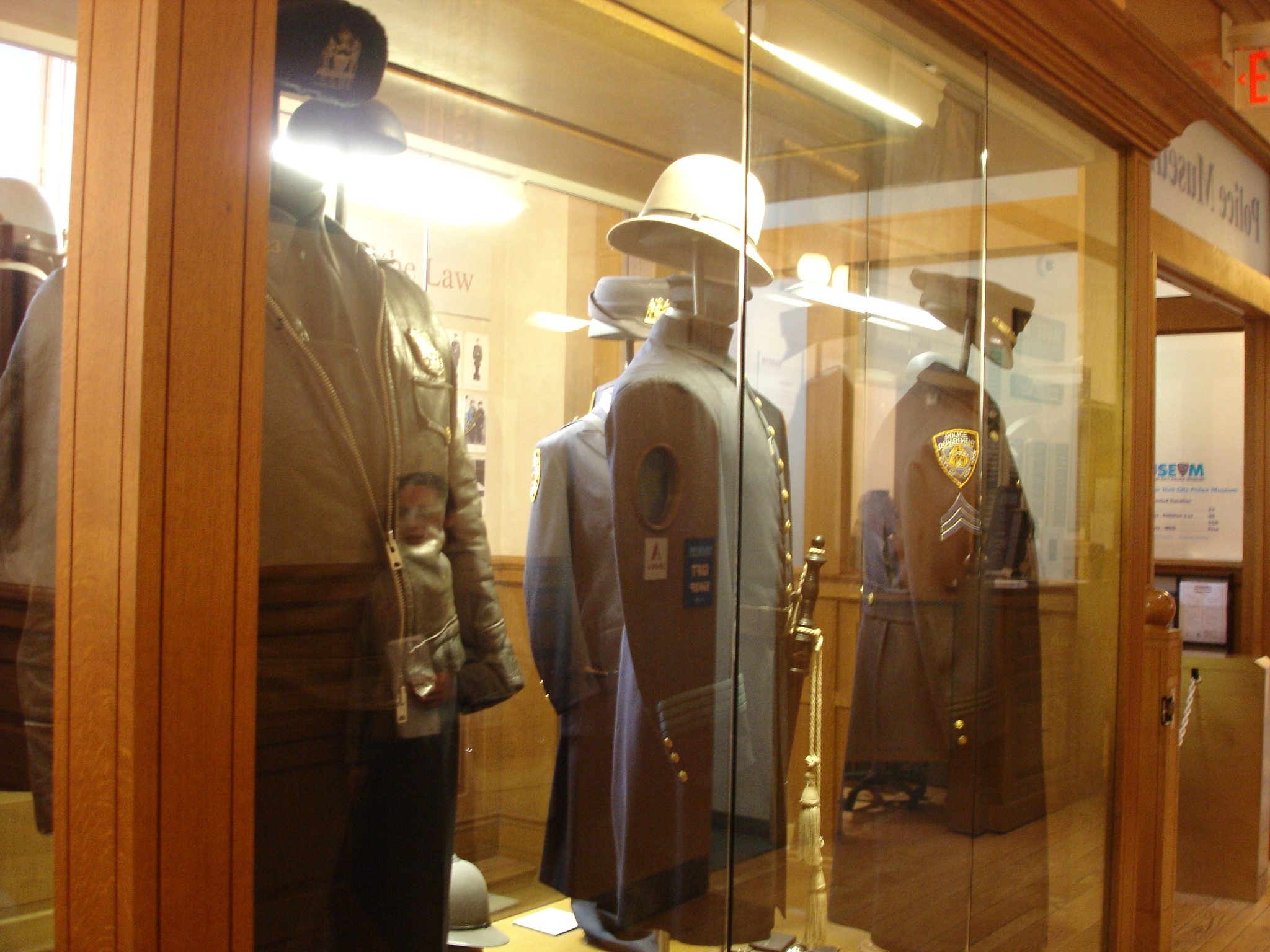
Police uniforms on display in the museum

Among the items in the items in the museum's collection are the original New York Yankees logo, which was designed by Louis Tiffany and predates the team's existence. Throughout its history, the museum's locations have included a 1972 Plymouth Fury, a model of a jail cell, a timeline of transportation, lock-picking tools belonging to Willie Sutton, an extensive exhibit on September 11 that occupies the museum's third floor, and a Hall of Heroes that includes the name and badge of every NYPD officer killed in the line of duty, starting with David Martin on August 6, 1861. The exhibit that the museum assembled for the first anniversary of the September 11 attacks allowed visitors to gain an immediate impression of the physical damage caused by the attacks and the debris that fell around Ground Zero. The museum was also known for its long-running car show.

== Locations ==
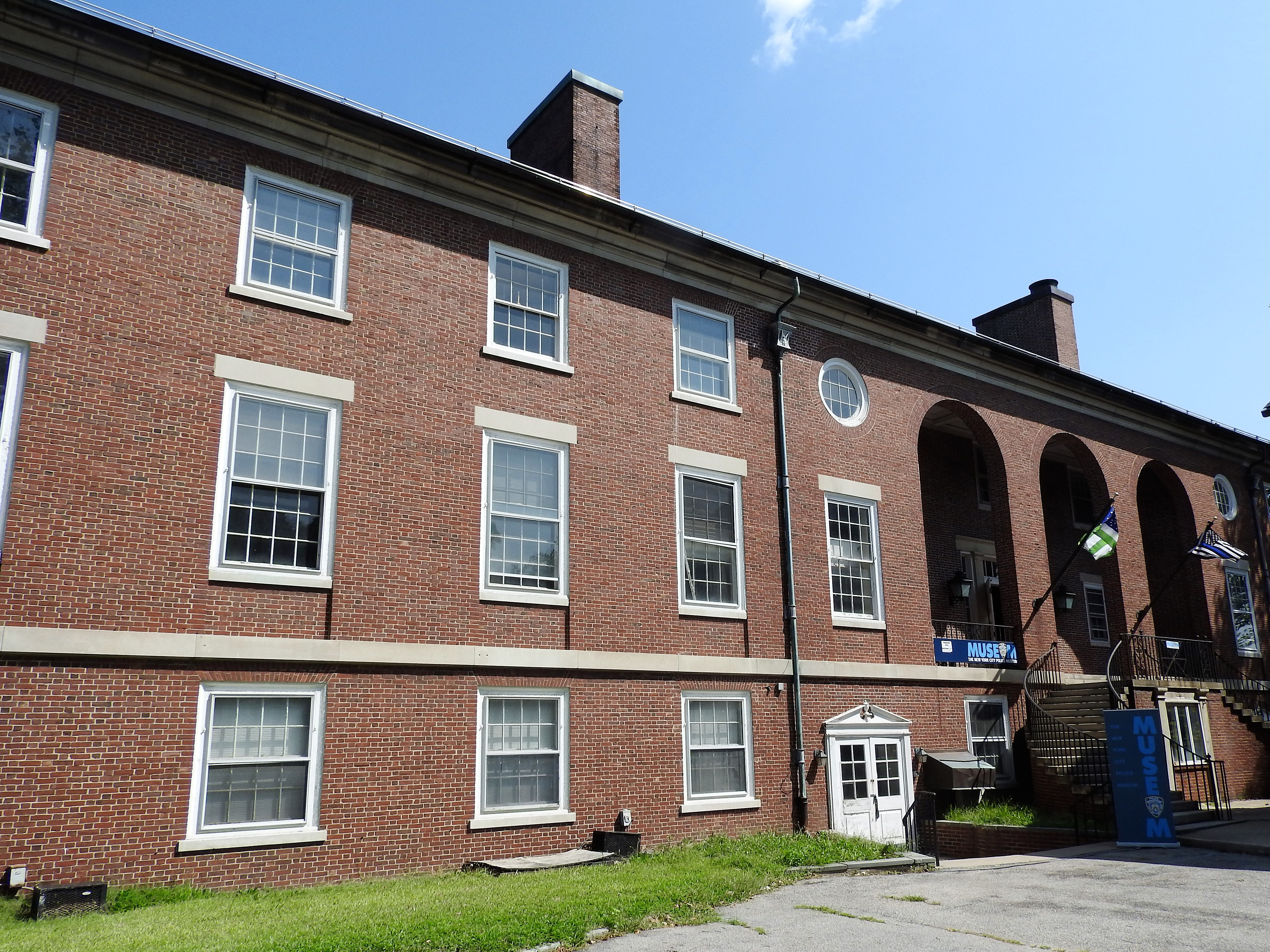
Temporary museum on Governors Island

The museum, which was originally a gallery housed at the New York City Police Academy on East 20th Street has operated in a number of temporary and semi-permanent locations in Manhattan during its history. As of 2023, the museum is without a permanent home following flood damage at 100 Old Slip due to Hurricane Sandy. In 2019, the loss of the museum was cited as a part of the increased lack of understanding about policing in New York City and beyond.

=== Broadway location ===
From its January 2000 opening at 26 Broadway near Bowling Green, the museum was privately run with support from the city, including more than ten years of free rent and staffing by police officers. Private donors provided more than $2 million for the construction of the museum, while the city contributed $1 million. The museum has been criticized by some who believe it glosses over some of the low moments of the department in its quest to show the good work of the Department.

The new museum replaced a small gallery that had been housed in the police academy on East 20th Street. Among the exhibits at the new location were: a display of the evolution of police uniforms since their inception in 1853, a gun used by Al Capone's gang in the 1928 murder of Frankie Yale, the first machine gun used in a gangland killing in New York, and a gift from Italy to the City of New York following the assassination of Lieutenant Joseph Petrosino in Sicily in 1909, the only member of NYPD to be killed in the line of duty on foreign soil. Other exhibits include a green and white radio car, antique firearms and a wooden desk from the 46th Precinct in the Morris Heights neighborhood of the Bronx.

=== Old Slip location ===
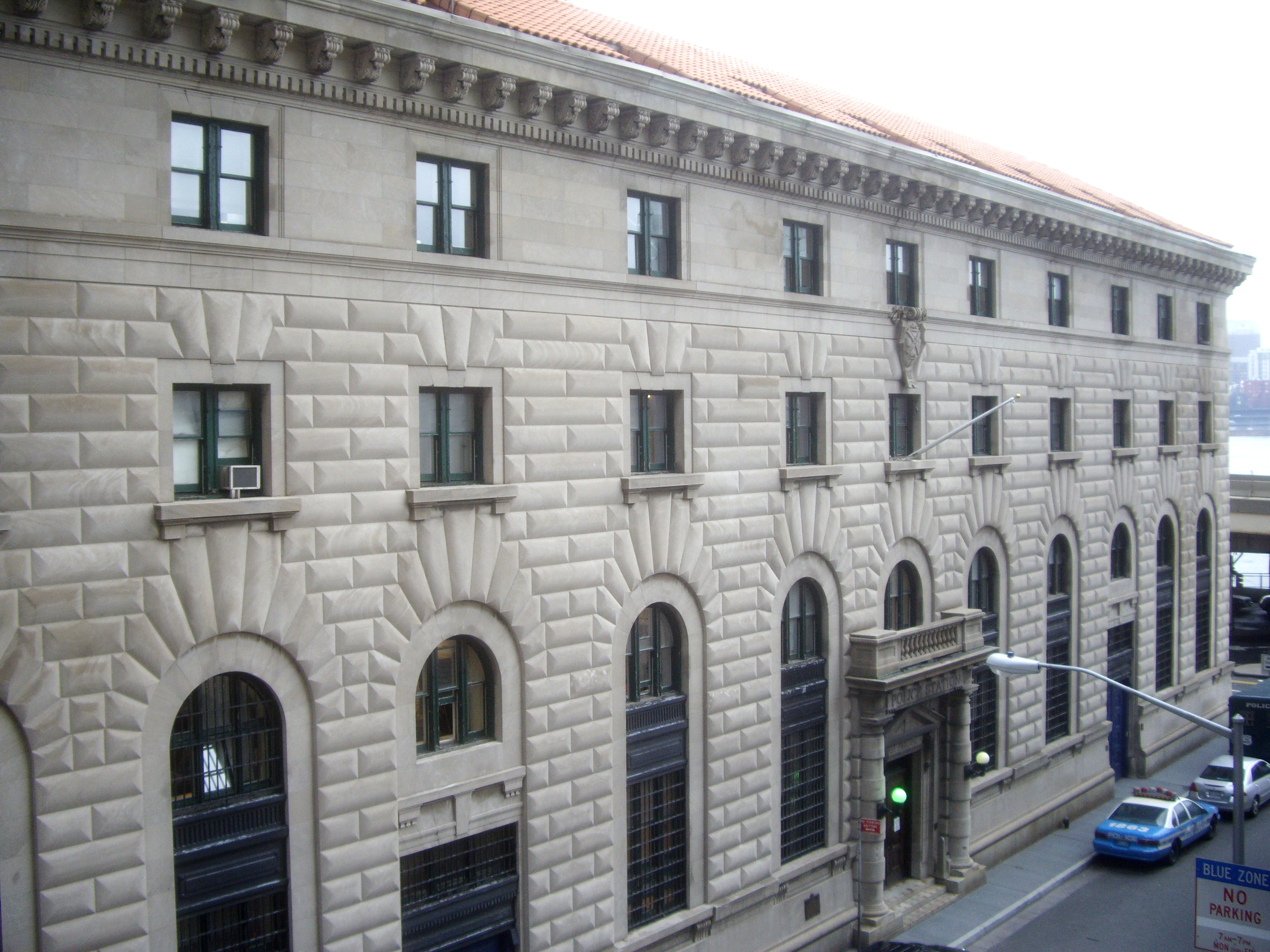
Old Slip location

In January 2002, the museum re-opened in a new location on Old Slip, closer to South Street Seaport. The new premises, appropriately, were the old First Precinct Building, designed by the partnership of Richard Howland Hunt and Joseph Howland Hunt (Note: The brothers, who established their partnership in 1901, and were better known for their elegant Long Island and Newport residences, were the sons of Richard Morris Hunt.) and built in 1909-11. The landmarked building was a model precinct house in its time. From 1884 to 1973 this Florentine Renaissance palazzo with its bold rusticated facades was the home of the First Precinct, which one historian called "the most important police precinct in the world." That precinct closed due to a corruption scandal in 1977, and museum officials saw a move to this location as an opportunity to connect with the department's history. Construction and renovation of the new space cost more than $4 million and exhibition space grew by nearly 45%.

=== Subsequent locations ===
In October 2012, Hurricane Sandy caused substantial damage at 100 Old Slip, and the museum reopened on October 24, 2013 in a temporary space at 45 Wall Street. That location closed in 2014, In summer 2017, the museum was housed in a pop up on Governors Island.

== Controversy ==
Although recognized for its importance in documenting NYPD's archives, the museum has been mired in controversy since its start. Then-police chief Howard Safir faced criticism for a deal, later rejected, with a business group that offered to pay for renovations at the museum in exchange for a police substation in the financial district. In 2001, museum director Sgt. Thomas Gambino and a lieutenant were revealed to be driving expensive automobiles leased by the museum, a private institution. They were also using prime office space near the museum without paying rent, another violation of police regulations that prohibit officers from accepting gifts. They were, along with several officers, reassigned to other police duties.

== See also ==
- List of museums and cultural institutions in New York City
