= Richard Sheirer =

New York City official (1946–2012)

Richard James Sheirer

Commissioner, NYC Office of Emergency Management
- In office February 2000 – March 2002
- Appointed by: Rudolph Giuliani
- Preceded by: Jerome Hauer
- Succeeded by: John T. Odermatt

Personal details
- Born: October 12, 1946 Brooklyn, New York City
- Died: January 19, 2012 (aged 65) Beth Israel Medical Center, Manhattan, New York City

Richard James Sheirer (October 12, 1946 – January 19, 2012) was a public servant and New York City official. Sheirer served as the director of the New York City Office of Emergency Management (O.E.M.) from February 2000 to March 2002.

== Life ==
Sheirer was born in Brooklyn on October 12, 1946, and raised in the borough's Canarsie, Williamsburg and Flatbush neighborhoods. He graduated from St. Francis College in Brooklyn Heights.

Sheirer had begun his career as a dispatcher for the New York City Fire Department (FDNY) in 1967. He was promoted to deputy commissioner under NYC Fire Commissioner Howard Safir. Safir, who became the New York City Police Commissioner in 1996, named Sheirer as his deputy commissioner for administration and chief of staff.

In February 2000, New York City Mayor Rudolph Giuliani appointed Sheirer as director of the OEM (Giuliani had created the department in 1996). Sheirer was thrust into the public eye in September 2001, when, as director of the OEM during the September 11th attacks, he became responsible for New York City's rescue and recovery effort. Sheirer coordinated the rescue and clean-up efforts at the former World Trade Center site, involving numerous federal, state, and local emergency agencies. He stepped down as director of the OEM in March 2002 when Mayor Michael Bloomberg took office.

Sheirer died at Beth Israel Medical Center in Manhattan on January 19, 2012, from a heart attack he suffered in Staten Island. He was survived by his wife, Barbara Winston, and their five sons: Matthew, Joseph, Christopher, Andrew and Paul.

On November 17, 2012 the City of New York renamed the segment of Laconia Avenue near Atlantic Avenue in Dongan Hills, Staten Island where Sheirer had resided to Commissioner Richard J. Sheirer Way.

Government offices
Preceded by Jerome Hauer	Director, NYC Office of Emergency Management; 2000-2002	Succeeded by John T. Odermatt
