= New York City Emergency Management =

New York City government agency

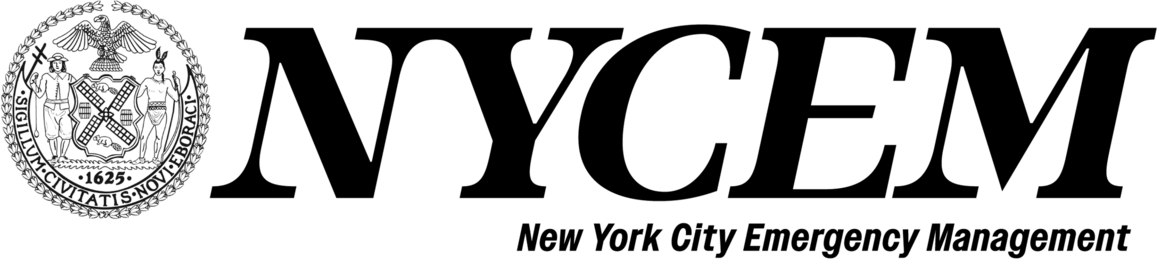

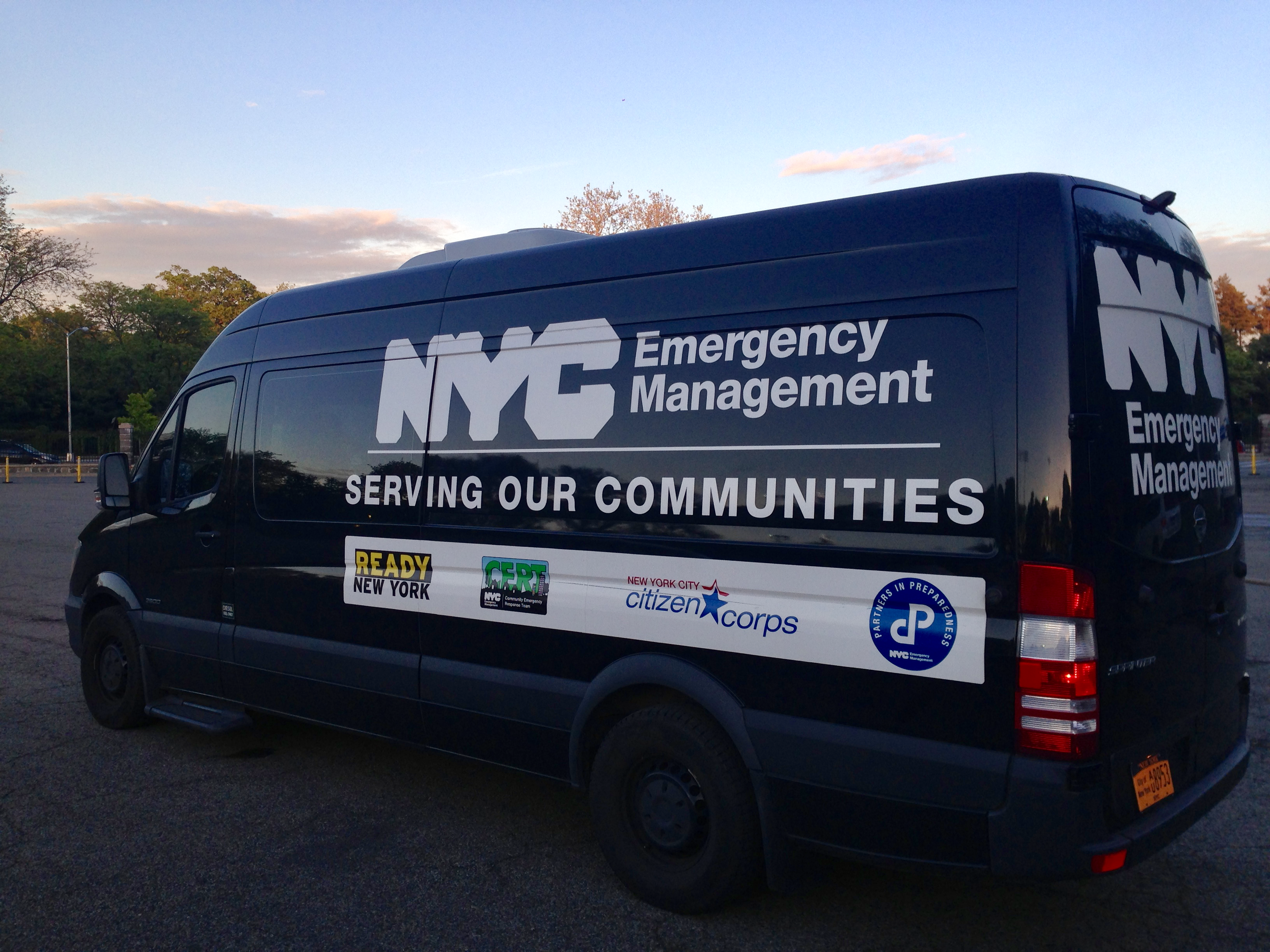
- Agency van with old logo.

Agency overview
- Formed: 1996; 30 years ago
- Jurisdiction: City of New York
- Headquarters: 165 Cadman Plaza East Brooklyn, NY
- Employees: 209 (2020)
- Annual budget: $473 million (FY 2020)
- Agency executive: Christina Farrell, Commissioner
- Key document: New York City Charter
- Website: www1.nyc.gov/site/em/index.page

New York City Emergency Management (NYCEM), formerly the New York City Office of Emergency Management (OEM), was formed in 1996 as a part of the Mayor's Office under Rudy Giuliani. By a vote of city residents in 2001 it became a Charter agency, and is headed by the commissioner of emergency management, who is appointed by the Mayor. In 2006 the office was reorganized to function under the deputy mayor for administration by Mayor Michael Bloomberg.

== Agency functions ==
The agency is responsible for development and oversight of New York City's emergency management plans. NYCEM regularly tests plans by conducting drills and exercises, and responds to emergencies to ensure that other agencies not only follow these plans, but to foster communication amongst the responding agencies. NYCEM also operates the city's Emergency Operations Center (EOC) where city, state and federal agencies join representatives from the private and nonprofit sectors to coordinate complex responses to emergencies and disasters.

The agency also developed and runs the Notify NYC emergency alert program, by which citizens can sign up to receive phone and email alerts about emergencies and events happening in their neighborhoods.

The agency is also the administrator of New York City's "community emergency response teams". Each community emergency response team (CERT) is coterminous with one or more New York City community boards.

NYCEM also maintains the Citywide Incident Management System which is based on the National Incident Management System.

== 7 WTC and post-9/11 buildings ==
From 1999 until September 11, 2001, New York City's Emergency Operations Center was housed on the 23rd floor of the 7 World Trade Center building. Prior to the decision to use 7 World Trade Center, MetroTech Center, in Brooklyn, was also considered for the Emergency Operations Center.

Richard Sheirer was the director of the OEM at the time of the September 11 attacks, and thus became in charge of the city's rescue and recovery effort. As the office in the World Trade Center was severely damaged, OEM was temporarily housed at Pier 92 of New York Passenger Ship Terminal on Manhattan's West Side. Pier 92 was chosen because OEM had some facilities there in anticipation of a scheduled bio-terrorism preparedness exercise that was to have taken place on September 12, 2001 (Operation TriPOD was later conducted on May 22, 2002.)

Before moving into the new building, OEM was located in a warehouse beneath the Brooklyn Bridge.

== New building ==
The new structure formerly served as the New York City headquarters for the American Red Cross of Greater New York. The $50 million renovation plan, funded partly by the federal government, called for the fifty-year-old building to be completely gutted and outfitted with the latest in audio-visual and communications technology.

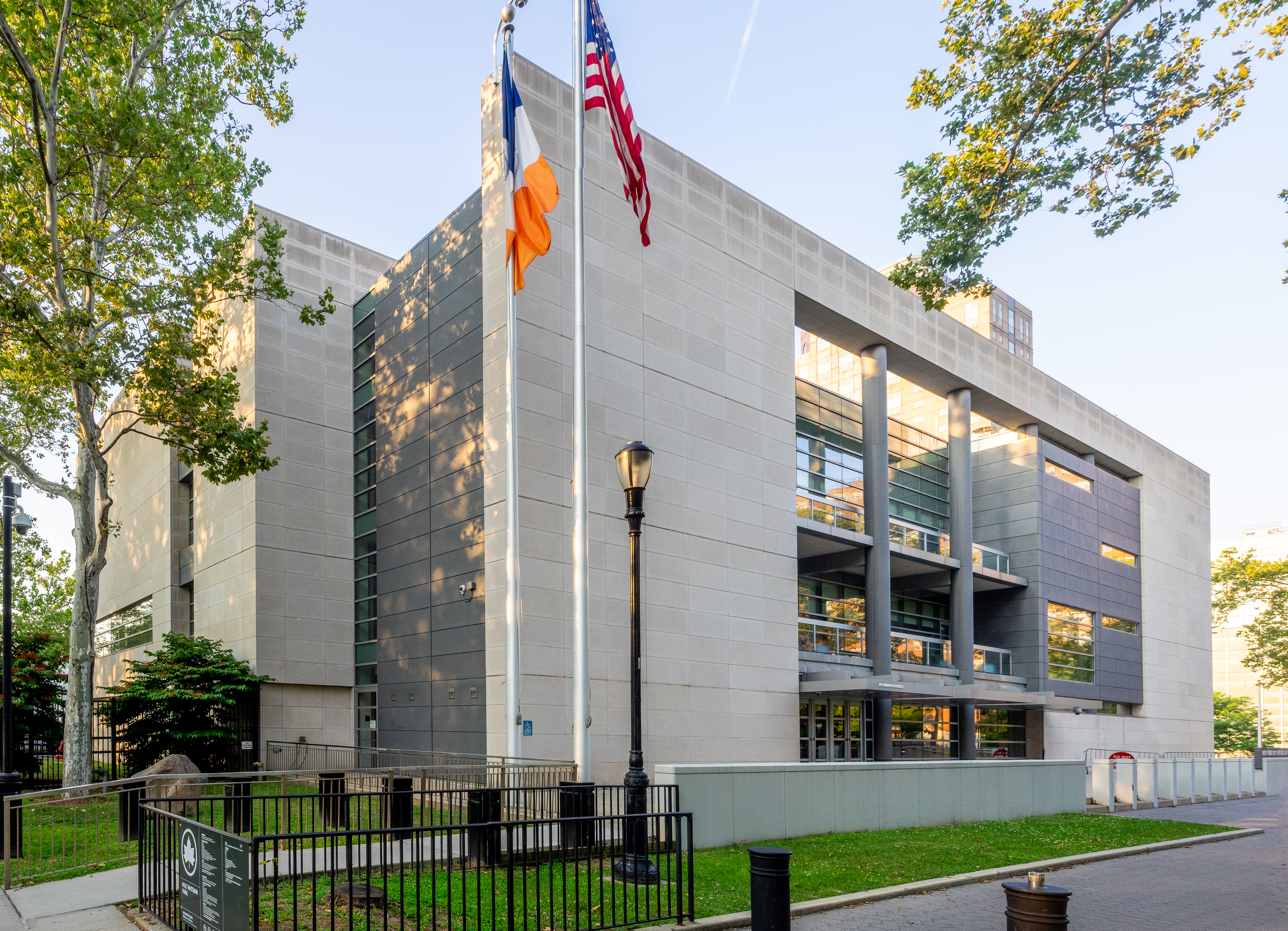
NYCEM Headquarters, 165 Cadman Plaza East, Brooklyn, NY 11201

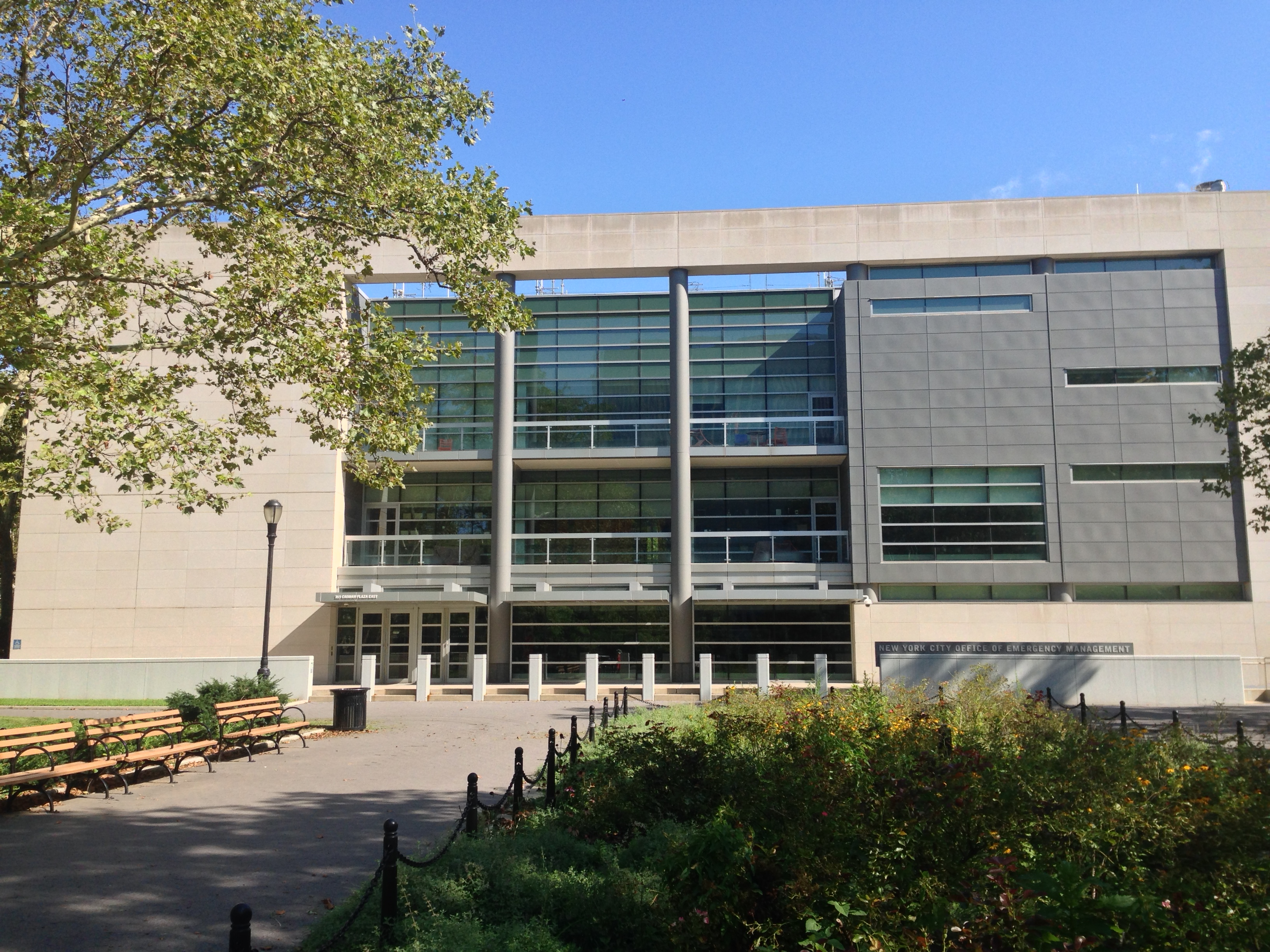
NYC Emergency Management HQ, 165 Cadman Plaza East, Brooklyn. Front view

On December 5, 2006, Mayor Michael Bloomberg joined OEM commissioner Joseph F. Bruno, former OEM directors Richard Sheirer and John Odermatt, NYCEM personnel, and other dignitaries to unveil the agency's new state-of-the-art headquarters. The facility is located at 165 Cadman Plaza East in Downtown Brooklyn; it replaces the agency's former offices at 7 World Trade Center and temporary spaces used since that office was destroyed on 9/11.

The new NYCEM building contains three floors and 65,000 square feet (6,000 m^{2}) of space. It houses general offices for NYCEM staff, several conference rooms and spaces for senior officials to meet, the Joint Information Center (a facility for and composed of press officers from several city agencies which can quickly disseminate information to the public), a state-of-the-art media briefing room, Watch Command, and the city's Emergency Operations Center (EOC). The building is staffed 24-hours a day, seven days a week.

The nerve center of NYCEM is its Watch Command. It is staffed 24/7 with representatives from the city's public safety agencies. They monitor police and fire broadcasts and dispatch NYCEM Field Responders if an incident warrants. Watch Commanders also have access to New York City's 911 systems and are responsible for alerting local, state, and federal officials of emergencies. They maintain direct contact with the New York State Emergency Management Office and surrounding jurisdictions to lend support or aid if needed.

NYCEM's new headquarters is also home to the City's Emergency Operations Center (EOC). The EOC serves as a central clearinghouse where local, state, and federal agencies can gather to assess and respond to emergencies. Activated for numerous events, the new EOC contains workstations for some 130 city, state, federal, and non-profit agencies, secure communications equipment, large video displays, and capacity for geographic information systems. The new structure was also New York City's first “green” agency headquarters: it utilizes energy-saving and environmentally sound construction techniques and qualifies for the Leadership in Energy and Environmental Design (LEED) Silver certification.

== Post-disaster modular housing ==
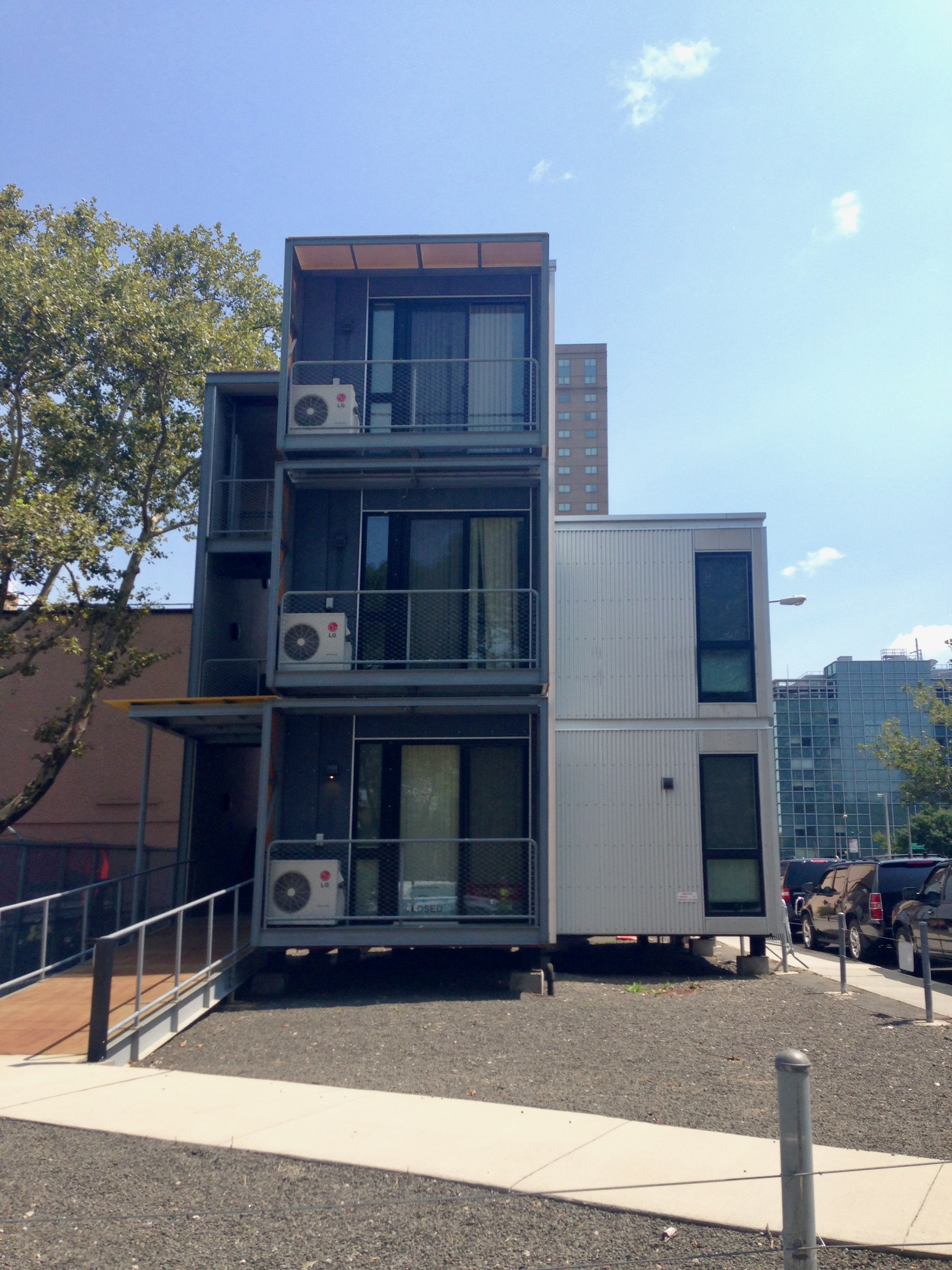
Modular post-disaster housing units

NYCEM also displays shipping container based modular temporary post-disaster housing units for evaluation in an area next to its headquarters. The units were designed by Garrison Architects and can be stacked up to four stories high. The prototype building consists of a 480 sq ft (45 m^{2}) single bedroom top floor and two 813 sq ft (75.5 m^{2}) three-bedroom floors.

== Agency executives ==
A well-known former NYCEM commissioner, Deanne Criswell, was appointed by President Joe Biden as Administrator (head) of the Federal Emergency Management Agency (FEMA) based in DC for 2019-21 -- prior to her time at NYCEM, Criswell worked at FEMA and then led Aurora, Colorado's OEM.

- Jerome Hauer – Director, 1996–2000
- Richard Sheirer – Director, 2000–2002
- John T. Odermatt – Director, April 4, 2002 – December 2003
- Joseph F. Bruno – Commissioner, March 4, 2004 – June 27, 2014
- Joseph Esposito – Commissioner, June 27, 2014 – June 30, 2019
- Deanne Criswell – Commissioner, July 1, 2019 – 2021
- John Scrivani – Commissioner, 2021
- Andrew D’Amora – Commissioner, 2021 – January 2, 2022
- Christina Farrell – Acting Commissioner, January 3 to February 17, 2022
- Zach Iscol – Commissioner, February 17, 2022 – February 11, 2026
- Christina Farrell – Commissioner, February 16, 2026 – present

== See also ==
- United States government operations and exercises on September 11, 2001
- Rescue and recovery effort after the September 11 attacks on the World Trade Center
- Notify NYC
