= William M. Feehan =

American Deputy Commissioner firefighter (1929-2001)

William Michael Feehan
- Born: September 29, 1929; Long Island City, New York City, U.S.
- Died: September 11, 2001 (aged 71); World Trade Center, New York City, U.S.
- Cause of death: Collapse of 1 World Trade Center during the September 11 attacks
- Occupation: Firefighter
- Known for: First Deputy Commissioner of the Fire Department New York
- Military career
- Allegiance: United States
- Branch: United States Army
- Service years: 1952–1959
- Rank: Captain
- Wars: Korean War

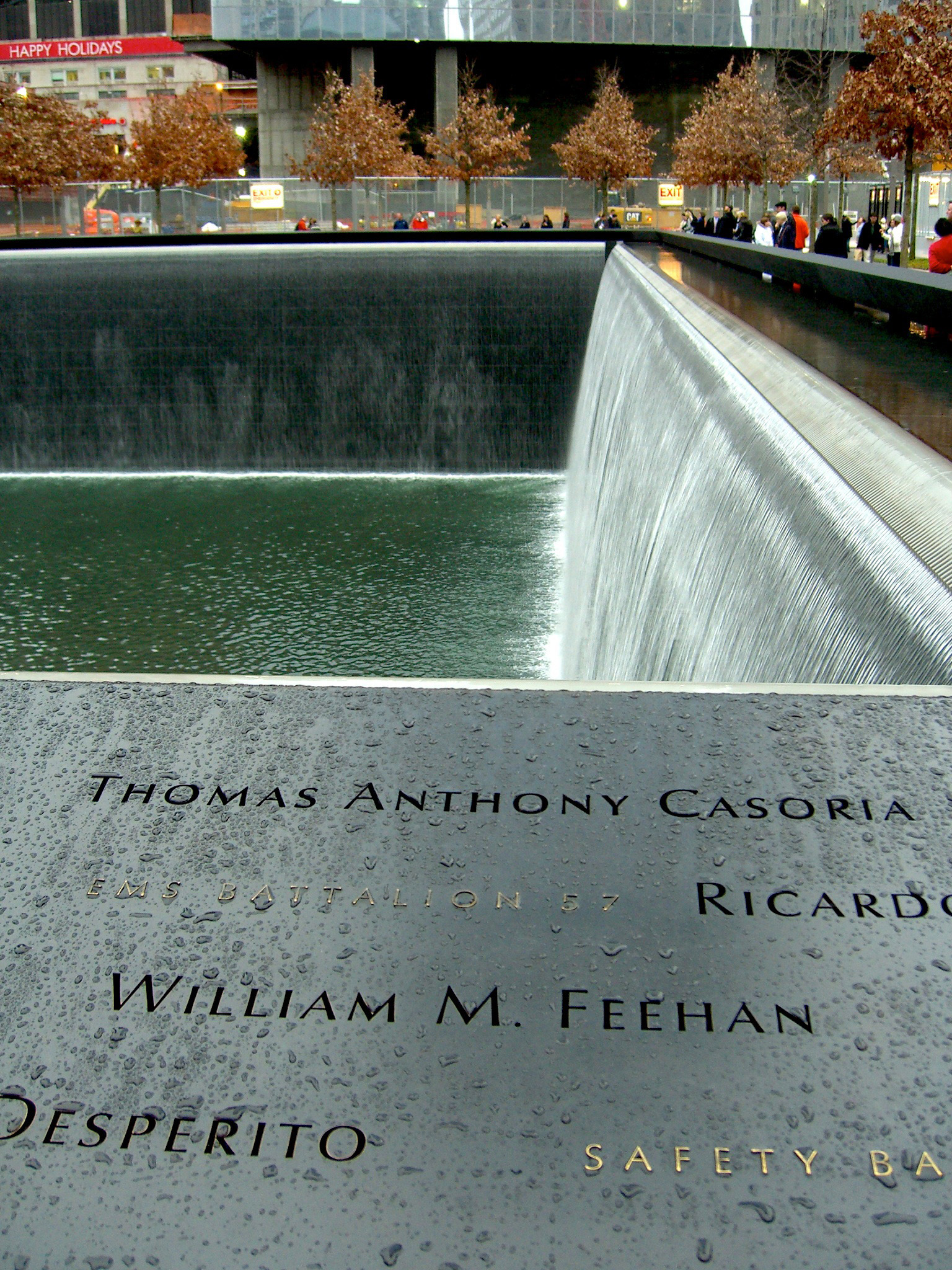
Feehan’s name is located on Panel S-18 of the National September 11 Memorial's South Pool, along with those of other first responders.

William Michael Feehan (September 29, 1929 – September 11, 2001) was a member of the Fire Department of New York who died during the collapse of the World Trade Center during the September 11 attacks. He was the second-highest official in the department.

== Early life ==
William Feehan was born September 29, 1929, in Long Island City, Queens, and grew up in Jackson Heights. Feehan was an Irish American; his paternal grandparents, William and Julia Feehan, were immigrants from Ireland.

Feehan graduated from Saint John's University in 1952. He served in the United States Army in Korea during the Korean War, during which he was decorated with the Combat Infantry Badge, Korean Service Medal, UN Service Medal and National Defense Service Medal.

== Career ==
Feehan held every rank within the fire department, starting with Probationary Firefighter upon his appointment on October 10, 1959, and was the first firefighter to do so. He was promoted to Lieutenant in 1964 and eventually to Chief of Department in 1991. In 1992, he was appointed Deputy Fire Commissioner. Upon the resignation of Fire Commissioner Carlos M. Rivera, he briefly served as Acting Fire Commissioner through the end of Mayor David N. Dinkins administration from August 31, 1993, until December 31, 1993.

After then-incoming Mayor Rudolph W. Giuliani picked Howard Safir to become Fire Commissioner of the City of New York, Feehan returned to his previous position of First Deputy Fire Commissioner of the City of New York. Although high-ranking members of the FDNY and other city departments ordinarily are asked to step aside for incoming mayors to make their own appointments, according to an FDNY spokesman, this was not requested of Feehan, because he was so knowledgeable that he "was thought to know the location of every fire hydrant in the city." Feehan served in that position, the second-highest position in the department, until his death.

== Personal life ==
Feehan lived in Flushing, Queens. Feehan was married to Elizabeth Ann Keegan (1933–1996) for 40 years until her death in 1996, three days after her 63rd birthday.

== Death and legacy ==
On September 11, 2001, during the September 11 attacks, Feehan was at a forward command post with Chief Peter J. Ganci Jr. during the collapse of the North Tower of the World Trade Center, and was killed in that event. He was 71. Tom Junod, writing in Esquire, wrote that surviving first responders remember Feehan admonishing a bystander who was recording individuals jumping from the building's windows, asking them "Don't you have any human decency?"

Feehan was survived by his daughters, Elizabeth Feehan and Tara Davan, and sons, William Feehan and firefighter John Feehan, who had worked in Squad Company 252 and as Captain of Engine 249. He was also survived by six grandchildren. At the National 9/11 Memorial, Feehan is memorialized at the South Pool, on Panel S-18.

In 2015, the FDNY acquired a fireboat named after Feehan. The vessel is a fast response fireboat, capable of pumping 8,000 gallons per minute, with a top speed of 40 knots (74 km/h). It is 66 feet (20 m) long and was made by using scrap metal from the Twin Towers.

Fire appointments
Preceded by Carlos M. Rivera	FDNY Commissioner; August 1993-January 1994	Succeeded by Howard Safir
