= Emergency notification app =

An emergency notification app is a software application designed to broadcast emergency notifications to one or multiple groups of contacts via various delivery methods. It is built to run on mobile devices such as smartphones and tablet computers. An emergency notification app may be part of a wider emergency notification system or it may be provided as an alternative to such a system.

== Emergency Service Response App ==
An Emergency Services Response App is designed to take in emergency incidents from Public Safety Answering Points via e-mail, fax, or direct communication means and then transmit this information to first responders. This includes direct through app, text message, or even by e-mail. The app allows responders to respond into the system that they are responding to the incident allowing incident response and management information to be exchanged amongst the system. Additional features with the platform include mapping, pre-planning, and other resource references among all responders.

First to market systems included "eDispatches". eDispatches. which was created in 2004 by Former Fire Chief Tom Stearn and was the first to provide text messages and recorded audio for two-tone paging systems. This was followed by "I am Responding app". I am Responding. which was started in 2006 by Daniel Seidberg and Bradley Pinsky which introduced alert messaging to public safety in web app form. Then in 2009 Geoffrey Giordano, Larry Mark, and later Jason Fisch launched "Spotteddog ROVER". Spotteddog ROVER. which introduced several new features including a formal native app to mobile devices, ETA to location for responders, and mapping/ pre-plans.

Common features on this platform include:
· Instant custom text messages of alarms.
· Custom sign board display capability.
· Smart phone GPS capability.
· Mapping capability.
· Custom integration with other systems.

== See also ==
- Emergency Alert System
- Emergency Communication System
- Emergency notification system
- Wireless Emergency Alerts
