= William M. Feehan (fireboat) =

Fireboat operated by the FDNY

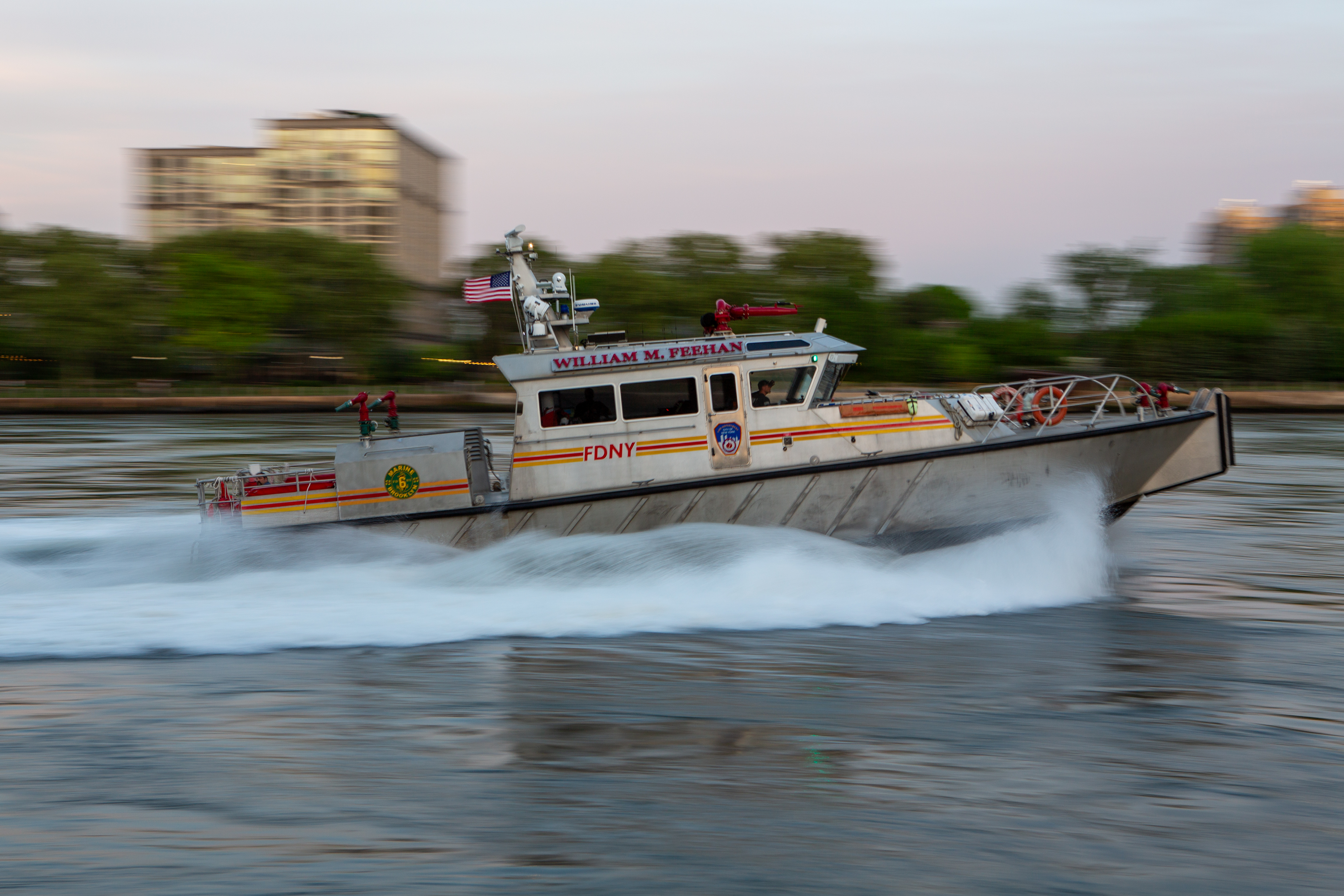

History
- Name: William M. Feehan
- Operator: New York City Fire Department
- Builder: MetalCraft Marine, Kingston
- In service: November 20, 2015
- Status: In active service

General characteristics
- Type: Fireboat
- Length: 66 ft (20 m)
- Installed power: 3 x 1,150 bhp (860 kW) engines
- Speed: 46 mph (74 km/h)
- Notes: 5 × water cannons

William M. Feehan is a fireboat built for and operated by the New York City Fire Department (FDNY). Her namesake, William M. Feehan, was the oldest and most senior FDNY firefighter to perish in the line of duty on September 11, 2001. Her nameplate is carved from a steel plate salvaged from the collapse of the World Trade Center. The vessel's $4.7 million cost was largely covered by a FEMA Port Security Grant Program.

== Background ==
The boat is designed to operate in shallow waters, including bay areas close to LaGuardia and John F. Kennedy airports. She also has systems to protect those onboard from chemical, biological, radiological and nuclear hazards using a pressurized and filtered cabin.

She was built in Kingston, Ontario, at MetalCraft Marine. Wellwishers gathered to welcome her as she transited the Oswego Canal, Erie Canal, and Hudson River.

The fireboat entered service on November 20, 2015.

== Specifications ==
Constructed by MetalCraft Marine at Kingston, Ontario, William M. Feehan cost $4.7 million to build. The fireboat is 66 feet (20 m) long and powered by three 1,150 brake horsepower (860 kW) engines. The vessel has a maximum speed of 46 miles per hour (74 km/h). William M. Feehan is equipped with five water cannons, projecting 8,000 gallons per minute.
