= Giuliani Partners =

Security consulting firms

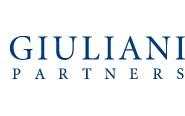
- Company type: Private
- Industry: Management consulting Security consulting Real estate Investment funds
- Founded: 2002
- Headquarters: New York City, U.S.
- Key people: Rudy Giuliani (founder, CEO and chairman)
- Revenue: $40 million (est. 2007)
- Number of employees: About 60 (2007) about 50 (2008) fewer (2010)
- Website: giulianipartners.com

Giuliani Partners LLC is a management consulting and security consulting business founded by former New York City Mayor Rudy Giuliani in January 2002. As of 2020, Dun & Bradstreet estimated that the business had 20 employees and revenues of $6.34 million.

== Structure ==
Rudy Giuliani is chairman and CEO of Giuliani Partners. Many of the managing partners and executives of Giuliani Partners are former New York City officials, counsels, or emergency services leaders, and associates from Giuliani's time as mayor. There is a subsidiary of the partnership, Giuliani Security & Safety LLC (before 2005, Giuliani-Kerik), which focuses on security consulting, especially regarding buildings; its chairman and CEO is Pasquale J. D'Amuro, a former assistant director in charge at the Federal Bureau of Investigation's New York office, and an inspector in charge following the September 11 attacks. Other subsidiaries include Giuliani Safety & Security Asia and Giuliani Compliance Japan.

Giuliani Partners' stated mission expresses "dedicated to helping leaders solve critical strategic issues, accelerate growth, and enhance the reputation and brand of their organizations in the context of strongly held values ... based on six fundamental principles: Integrity, Optimism, Courage, Preparedness, Communication, Accountability." "No client is ever approved or worked on without a full discussion with Rudy ... We're cautious in the right sense of that term, in terms of who we work for. We always want to make sure it is a company that is doing the right thing, that we're proud to represent", according to Giuliani Partners' senior managing partner, Michael D. Hess, former corporation counsel for New York City.

Giuliani's colleagues at Giuliani Partners have included founding member and vice president Matthew Mahoney, a former deputy director of advance for the mayor's office; Bernard Kerik, Giuliani's former police commissioner, who was later accused of having ties to organized crime and resigned from the firm in 2004; former FBI investigator D'Amuro, who admitted to taking six non-evidentiary artifacts from Ground Zero as mementos, but against whom no action was taken by the FBI; and Monsignor Alan Placa, a high school friend of Giuliani and a former Roman Catholic priest who was accused of sexually molesting a teenager and of covering up molestation in the church. Giuliani Partners has stated that Giuliani "believes that Alan Placa has been unjustly accused", and that the firm has no plans to stop representing him.

The firm is privately held. Sources have placed Giuliani Partners' earnings at over $100 million in the five years through early 2007. Another estimate shows it with annual revenues of $40 million and 55 employees. After stepping down as CEO and chairman, Giuliani retained a 30 percent equity stake in the partnership, which paid him $4.1 million in 2006. The firm's fortunes, which had always been dependent upon Giuliani's star power, diminished due to Giuliani's absence during his campaign, which ended in late January 2008. Its client list and revenues decreased, and staff was reduced from about 60 to about 50 employees.

During the 2008 presidential election effort, Peter Powers was chairman and CEO of Giuliani Partners, having replaced Giuliani in June 2007, ahead of the 2008 Rudy Giuliani presidential campaign. Peters was formerly a deputy mayor of New York.

Giuliani subsequently returned to work at the firm, splitting time between it and the law firm Bracewell & Giuliani. The company specialized in consulting on energy-related matters. In July 2008, Giuliani Partners announced it was diversifying via the creation of a real estate investment fund that would target foreign investors seeking to capitalize on the weak dollar and invest in New York and Washington, D.C. real estate. The fund would be a collaboration with Rockville, Maryland-based Berman Enterprises. By mid-2009, Giuliani Partners was still feeling the effects of Giuliani's ongoing political life, including the departure of former Giuliani chief of staff Anthony V. Carbonetti, who was working on possible Giuliani-related aspects of the New York gubernatorial election, 2010.

The firm's headquarters had been in 5 Times Square, at the south end of New York City's Times Square, since its founding. In 2010, the firm relocated to Manhattan to share office space with the New York office of Giuliani's other law partnership, Texas law firm Bracewell & Giuliani. The firm had further reduced its number of employees, and Bracewell & Giuliani became the former mayor's primary public business activity.

== Client base ==
Giuliani Partners has been categorized by various media outlets as a lobbying entity capitalizing on Giuliani's name recognition. Clients of Giuliani Partners are required to sign confidentiality agreements that preclude commentary about the work the firm's work and fees. Giuliani has refused to talk about his clients, services rendered, compensation received, or any details about the company.

One of Giuliani Partners' clients during this time was Hank Asher, an admitted drug smuggler and millionaire founder of companies that perform electronic information gathering (datamining) on individuals. According to a shareholder in the company, Asher hired Giuliani for his "influence with the federal government to enable Mr. Asher to take an active role in Seisint as a chief executive officer despite the allegations about his drug dealing". Giuliani helped Asher's company obtain $12 million in government grants. After Asher's past was publicly revealed, he resigned from the company; Giuliani defended him to newspapers without mentioning that Asher was a paying client. After Asher's resignation, investors in Seisint reported that Giuliani was paid US$2 million a year in fees, a commission on sales of Seisint products, and 800,000 warrants for Seisint stock, which would prove valuable when Seisent was sold to LexisNexis for $775 million. One investor sued the board, claiming that Giuliani's contributions had not been worth the large amount paid. The Seisent database product that Giuliani Partners was to help market the Multistate Anti-Terrorism Information Exchange, and was criticized on civil liberties grounds; within two years the program was disbanded.

In representing Purdue Pharma, maker of OxyContin, in a case against the Drug Enforcement Administration, Giuliani Partners negotiated a $2 million fine and no further penalty for what the DEA called "lax security" at plants that produced the drug, which the DEA said was being used as a recreational drug. The lead DEA investigator later said that Purdue Pharma escaped harsher penalties in the case because of Giuliani's connections to government officials. Giuliani later represented Purdue Pharma in a recently settled case in which the DEA accused the company of marketing OxyContin by playing down its level of addictive properties. Giuliani met with government lawyers six times to help negotiate a settlement in the case. Giuliani reached a deal to avoid a bar on Purdue Pharma doing business with the federal government.

Forbes reported in November 2006 that Giuliani Partners accepted fees from penny stock firms, made alliances that have gone nowhere, and formed pacts with businesses and individuals that have come under scrutiny by regulators and law enforcement officers. For instance, Giuliani Capital Advisors accepted 1.6 million warrants from Lighting Science Group at 60 cents, a fee of $150,000 and a promise to raise cash. The company went bankrupt, losing $412,000 on sales of $137,000 in the first part of 2006. A venture with CamelBak started out under Giuliani's consulting arrangement with $31 million in sales, but was run into the ground with various missteps, including having the disgraced Bernard Kerik sit on its board. Forbes said Giuliani's most controversial deal was throwing in with a 2004 project with Applied DNA Sciences. Its backer, Richard Langley Jr., had previously pleaded guilty to conspiracy to commit wire fraud and commercial bribery in another penny stock scam; another, Jeffrey Salzwedel, had been fined for making "unsuitable" stock recommendations to clients; and the brokerage firm Vertical Capital Partners, a third backer, had been penalized repeatedly for various securities violations.

Mexico City hired Giuliani Partners to consult on its crime rate, hoping for a drop in crime like that which New York City had experienced in the 1990s. Giuliani toured the city for a day and Giuliani Partners produced a report analyzing ways in which crime could be reduced. However, in the year after the plan was implemented, crime dropped by only 1% and some city officials expressed regret at hiring Giuliani for a $4.3 million fee. Some called it a "$4 million publicity stunt". Some of the recommendations that were put into place included using breathalyzers on drunk drivers and targeting "squeegee men".

Giuliani Partners has had contracts since 2005 with Qatar's Ministry of the Interior, for security advice and consulting services. These contracts were overseen by Minister Abdullah bin Khalifah Al Thani, a member of Qatar's royal family.

== Giuliani Capital Advisors ==
On December 1, 2004, his consulting firm announced it purchased accounting firm Ernst & Young's investment banking unit. The new investment bank would be known as Giuliani Capital Advisors LLC and would advise companies on acquisitions, restructurings, and other strategic issues.

On March 5, 2007, due to his presidential campaign, Giuliani Capital Advisors was sold to Macquarie Group, an Australian financial group, for an amount that analysts said may approach $100 million.
