= Howard Safir =

American politician (1942–2023)

- Safir in 2000

39th New York City Police Commissioner
- In office April 15, 1996 – August 19, 2000
- Mayor: Rudy Giuliani
- Preceded by: William Bratton
- Succeeded by: Bernard B. Kerik

29th New York City Fire Commissioner
- In office January 1, 1994 – April 15, 1996
- Mayor: Rudy Giuliani
- Preceded by: William M. Feehan
- Succeeded by: Thomas Von Essen

Personal details
- Born: February 24, 1942 New York City, U.S.
- Died: September 11, 2023 (aged 81) Annapolis, Maryland, U.S.
- Spouse: Carol Ferrara (m. 1965)
- Children: 2
- Education: Hofstra University

Howard Safir (February 24, 1942 – September 11, 2023) was an American law enforcement professional who served as the 29th New York City Fire Commissioner from 1994 to 1996 and the 39th New York City Police Commissioner from 1996 to 2000, under Mayor Rudy Giuliani. Safir later served as Chairman of Safir Intelligence and Security (formerly Vigilant Resources International).

== Early life and education ==
Safir was born in the Bronx on February 24, 1942. After growing up in the Bronx and Long Island, the son of Russian Jewish immigrant parents (his father was a presser in the garment district, his mother a switchboard operator), Safir followed the example of his famous uncle Louis Weiner (who captured infamous bank robber Willie Sutton), and after graduating from college in 1963, decided to become a lawman.

Safir received his B.A. in History and Political Science from Hofstra University in 1963. He attended Harvard University's John F. Kennedy School of Government, receiving certificates in the programs for Senior Managers in Government in 1988 and for National and International Security in 1989.

== Career ==
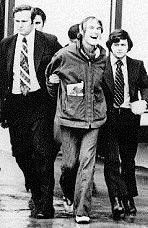
BNDD agents Don Strange (r.) and Howard Safir (l.) arrest Timothy Leary in 1972

Safir began his law enforcement career in 1965 as a special agent assigned to the New York office of the Federal Bureau of Narcotics, a forerunner of the Bureau of Narcotics and Dangerous Drugs (BNDD) and eventually, the Drug Enforcement Administration (DEA). Safir advanced through the ranks of the DEA and in 1977 was appointed Assistant Director of the DEA. He moved to the U.S. Marshals Service (USMS) in 1978 where he served as Chief of the Witness Security Division. In 1984, he was named Associate Director for Operations, of the USMS, a position he held until his retirement from the federal government in 1990. Safir rejoined government service in 1994 when Mayor Rudy Giuliani asked him to serve as New York City's 29th Fire Commissioner. When Police Commissioner William J. Bratton left his position in 1996, Giuliani appointed Safir to replace him as New York City's 39th Police Commissioner.

Commissioner Safir implemented a comprehensive Fugitive Strategy and established thirty-nine major anti-drug initiatives throughout the city including the Northern Manhattan Initiative. He created model blocks in each borough to prevent eradicated drug dealing from returning and he introduced closed-circuit television to ensure the safety of housing development residents, park visitors, and subway riders. Concerned for officer and public safety, Safir expanded firearms training and introduced Firearms Training Simulators. Under his leadership, firearms discharge incidents decreased from 344 in 1995 to 155 in 1999. He developed and implemented Operation Condor, a creative use of personnel resources, that continues to be a centerpiece of current NYPD crime reduction strategy. Safir served four years as Police Commissioner until he announced his resignation and retirement from government service in 2000.

In 1997, Safir appeared on the ABC TV series NYPD Blue, playing himself.

After Safir resigned as Police Commissioner in 2000, he immediately went to work as a consultant to the chief executive of ChoicePoint, Inc. and ultimately ran their Bode Technology Group subsidiary, which they purchased at Safir's urging in April 2001. In February 2007, Safir became CEO of Bode Technology when GlobalOptions Group, Inc. acquired The Bode Technology Group from ChoicePoint in a cash purchase for $12.5 million. Howard Safir was also Chairman of Safir Intelligence & Security.

== Professional memberships ==
Safir was a member of the executive committee of the International Association of Chiefs of Police (IACP) and served as a delegate to INTERPOL, the National Drug Policy Board, and the El Paso Intelligence Center Advisory Board.

== Personal life and death ==
Safir was married to Carol Ferrara in 1965 and had two children.

In 2010, Safir allegedly backed his SUV into a pregnant woman who was attempting to cross a street from between parked cars. According to the woman, she heard a female passenger scream "Are you not looking, there's someone there." He then drove off. Safir was tracked down through his license plate but no charges were filed. He claimed he was unaware he had struck anyone.

Safir died from sepsis in Annapolis, Maryland on September 11, 2023, at the age of 81.

== Awards and honors ==
Safir was recognized often throughout his career for his outstanding service. In 1996, he was awarded the Ellis Island Medal of Honor.

The Presidential Meritorious Executive Award was twice awarded to him. Additionally, he received the U.S. Marshals Service Meritorious Service Award and the Attorney General's Achievement Award, in addition to many other citations and awards.

Safir was a member of the Board of Trustees of The New York City Police Museum. He also served on the Board of Directors of Verint Systems and LexisNexis Special Services.

== Bibliography ==
- Safir, Howard; Ellis Whitman (2003). Security: policing your homeland, your city, your state. New York: Thomas Dunne Books.
- Safir, Howard (April 20, 2015). "Police brutality is inexcusable—and rare". United States. Crime. Time. Vol. 185, no. 14 (South Pacific ed.). pp. 22–23.

Fire appointments
Preceded by William M. Feehan	FDNY Commissioner; 1994–1996	Succeeded by Thomas Von Essen
Police appointments
Preceded by William J. Bratton	NYPD Commissioner; 1996–2000	Succeeded by Bernard Kerik
