= Rudy Giuliani =

American attorney and politician (born 1944)

- Giuliani in 2025

108th Mayor of New York City
- In office January 1, 1994 – December 31, 2001
- Preceded by: David Dinkins
- Succeeded by: Michael Bloomberg

United States Attorney for the Southern District of New York
- In office June 3, 1983 – January 1, 1989
- President: Ronald Reagan
- Preceded by: John S. Martin Jr.
- Succeeded by: Otto G. Obermaier

United States Associate Attorney General
- In office February 20, 1981 – June 3, 1983
- President: Ronald Reagan
- Preceded by: John H. Shenefield
- Succeeded by: D. Lowell Jensen

Personal details
- Born: Rudolph William Louis Giuliani; May 28, 1944 (age 82) New York City, U.S.
- Party: Republican (1980–present)
- Other political affiliations: Liberal (statewide)
- Spouses: Regina Peruggi (m. 1968; div. 1982) Donna Hanover (m. 1984; div. 2002) Judith Nathan (m. 2003; div. 2019)
- Children: Andrew; Caroline
- Education: Manhattan College (BA); New York University (JD)

Rudolph William Louis Giuliani (/ˌdʒuːliˈɑːni/, Italian: [dʒuˈljaːni]; born May 28, 1944) is an American politician and disbarred lawyer who served as the 108th mayor of New York City from 1994 to 2001. He previously served as the U.S. Associate Attorney General from 1981 to 1983 and the U.S. Attorney for the Southern District of New York from 1983 to 1989. Giuliani led the 1980s federal prosecution of New York City mafia bosses as U.S. attorney for the Southern District of New York. After a failed campaign for mayor of New York City in the 1989 election, he succeeded in 1993, and was reelected in 1997, campaigning on a "tough on crime" platform. He led New York's controversial "civic cleanup" from 1994 to 2001, and appointed William Bratton as New York City's new police commissioner. In 2000, he ran against First Lady Hillary Clinton for a U.S. Senate seat from New York, but left the race once diagnosed with prostate cancer. For his mayoral leadership following the September 11 attacks in 2001, he was called "America's mayor" and was named Time Person of the Year for 2001.

In 2002, Giuliani founded a security consulting business, Giuliani Partners, and acquired, but later sold, an investment banking firm, Giuliani Capital Advisors. In 2005, he joined a law firm, renamed Bracewell & Giuliani. Vying for the Republican Party's 2008 presidential nomination, Giuliani was an early frontrunner, yet did poorly in the primary election; he later withdrew and endorsed the party's subsequent nominee, John McCain. After declining to run for New York governor in 2010 and for the Republican presidential nomination in 2012, Giuliani turned his focus to his business firms. After advising Donald Trump during his 2016 presidential campaign and early administration, Giuliani joined President Trump's personal legal team in April 2018, remaining on it during the 2020 presidential election. His activities as Trump's attorney led to allegations that he engaged in corruption and profiteering. In 2019, Giuliani was a central figure in the Trump–Ukraine scandal.

Following the 2020 election, Giuliani represented Trump in many lawsuits filed in attempts to overturn the election results, making false and debunked allegations about rigged voting machines, polling place fraud, and an international communist conspiracy. Giuliani spoke at the rally preceding the January 6 United States Capitol attack, where he made false claims of voter fraud and called for "trial by combat". He was later also listed as an unindicted co-conspirator in the federal prosecution of Trump's alleged attempts to overturn the election. In August 2023, he was indicted in the prosecution related to the 2020 election in Georgia. Later in 2023, Giuliani lost a $148-million defamation lawsuit for his false claims about two election workers in Georgia, and unsuccessfully attempted to declare bankruptcy; he later reached a settlement to pay damages awarded to the election workers. In April 2024, he was indicted on charges related to the 2020 election in Arizona. He was disbarred in the state of New York in July and in the District of Columbia in September. In November 2025, Trump issued a federal pardon to Giuliani.

== Early life and education ==
Giuliani was born on May 28, 1944, in the East Flatbush section of Brooklyn, New York City, which at the time of his birth was a largely Italian American enclave of Brooklyn. He is the only child of working-class parents Helen (née D'Avanzo) and Harold Angelo Giuliani, both children of Italian immigrants. Harold Giuliani, a plumber and a bartender, had trouble holding a job, was convicted of felony assault and robbery, and served prison time in Sing Sing. Once released, Harold worked as an enforcer for his brother-in-law Leo D'Avanzo, who operated an organized crime-affiliated loan sharking and gambling ring from a restaurant in Brooklyn.

Giuliani was raised a Roman Catholic. When he was seven years old, his family moved from Brooklyn to Garden City South on Long Island, where he attended the local Catholic school, St. Anne's. Later, he commuted back to Brooklyn to attend Bishop Loughlin Memorial High School, from which he graduated in 1961. Giuliani attended Manhattan College in Riverdale, Bronx, where he majored in political science with a minor in philosophy. Giuliani was elected president of his class in his second year, but was not re-elected in his junior year. He joined the Phi Rho Pi college forensic fraternity and honor society. He graduated in 1965. Giuliani considered becoming a priest but decided to attend New York University School of Law in Manhattan, where he was a member of the New York University Law Review, and graduated cum laude with a Juris Doctor degree in 1968.

== Legal career ==
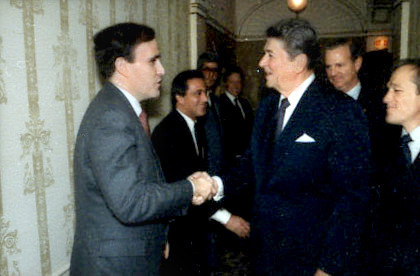
Giuliani greeting President Ronald Reagan in 1984

Giuliani started his career and political life as a Democrat, working as a Democratic Party committeeman on Long Island in the mid-1960s. In 1968, he volunteered for Robert F. Kennedy's campaign in the 1968 U.S. presidential election, and voted for George McGovern in the 1972 U.S. presidential election. After graduating from law school, Giuliani clerked for Judge Lloyd Francis MacMahon, U.S. district judge for the Southern District of New York.

Giuliani did not serve in the military during the Vietnam War. His conscription was deferred while he was enrolled at Manhattan College and NYU Law. Upon graduation from law school in 1968, he was classified 1-A (available for military service), but in 1969 he was reclassified 2-A (essential civilian) as Judge MacMahon's law clerk. In 1970, Giuliani was reclassified 1-A but received a high 308 draft lottery number and was not called up for service.

=== U.S. associate deputy attorney general ===
Giuliani switched his party registration from Democratic to independent in 1975. This occurred during a period of time in which he was recruited for a position in Washington, D.C., with the Ford administration. Giuliani served as the associate deputy attorney general and chief of staff to Deputy Attorney General Harold "Ace" Tyler.

His first high-profile prosecution was of Democratic U.S. representative Bertram L. Podell (NY-13), who was convicted of corruption. Podell pleaded guilty to conspiracy and conflict of interest for accepting more than $41,000 in campaign contributions and legal fees from a Florida airline to obtain federal rights for a Bahama route. Podell, who maintained a legal practice while serving in Congress, said the payments were legitimate legal fees. The Washington Post later reported, "The trial catapulted future New York mayor Rudolph Giuliani to front-page status when, as assistant U.S. attorney, he relentlessly cross-examined an initially calm Rep. Podell. The congressman reportedly grew more flustered and eventually decided to plead guilty."

From 1977 to 1981, during the Carter administration, Giuliani practiced law at the Patterson, Belknap, Webb and Tyler law firm as chief of staff to his former boss Ace Tyler. In later years, Tyler became "disillusioned" by what Tyler described as Giuliani's time as U.S. attorney, criticizing several of his prosecutions as "overkill". On December 8, 1980, one month after the 1980 U.S. presidential election brought Republicans back to power in Washington, he switched his party affiliation from independent to Republican. Giuliani later said the switches were because he found Democratic policies "naïve", and that "by the time I moved to Washington, the Republicans had come to make more sense to me." Others suggested that the switches were made to get positions in the Justice Department. Giuliani's mother maintained in 1988 that he "only became a Republican after he began to get all these jobs from them. He's definitely not a conservative Republican. He thinks he is, but he isn't. He still feels very sorry for the poor."

=== U.S. associate attorney general ===
In 1981, Giuliani was named U.S. Associate Attorney General in the Reagan administration, the third-highest position in the U.S. Department of Justice. As Associate Attorney General, Giuliani supervised the U.S. Attorney Offices' federal law enforcement agencies, the Department of Corrections, the Drug Enforcement Administration, and the U.S. Marshals Service. In a well-publicized 1982 case, Giuliani testified in defense of the U.S. federal government's "detention posture" regarding the internment of more than 2,000 Haitian asylum seekers who had entered the country illegally. The U.S. government disputed the assertion that most of the detainees had fled their country due to political persecution, alleging instead that they were "economic migrants". In defense of the government's position, Giuliani testified that "political repression, at least in general, does not exist" under Haitian president Jean-Claude Duvalier's regime.

=== U.S. attorney for the Southern District of New York ===
In 1983, Giuliani was appointed to be U.S. Attorney for the Southern District of New York, which was technically a demotion but was sought by Giuliani because of his desire to personally litigate cases and because the U.S. Attorney for the Southern District of New York is considered the highest-profile U.S. Attorney's Office in the country and as such is often used by those who have held the position as a springboard for running for public office. It was in this position that he first gained national prominence by prosecuting numerous high-profile cases, resulting in the convictions of Wall Street figures Ivan Boesky and Michael Milken. He also focused on prosecuting drug dealers, organized crime, and corruption in government. He amassed a record of 4,152 convictions and 25 reversals. As a federal prosecutor, Giuliani was credited with bringing the perp walk, parading of suspects in front of the previously alerted media, into common use as a prosecutorial tool. After Giuliani "patented the perp walk", the tool was used by increasing numbers of prosecutors nationwide.

Giuliani's critics said that he arranged for people to be arrested but then dropped charges for lack of evidence on high-profile cases rather than going to trial. In a few cases, his arrests of alleged white-collar criminals at their workplaces with charges later dropped or lessened sparked controversy and damaged the reputations of the alleged "perps". He said veteran stock trader Richard Wigton, of Kidder, Peabody & Co., was guilty of insider trading. In February 1987, he had officers handcuff Wigton and march him through the company's trading floor, with Wigton in tears. Giuliani had his agents arrest Tim Tabor, a young arbitrageur and former colleague of Wigton, so late that he had to stay overnight in jail before posting bond.

Within three months, charges were dropped against both Wigton and Tabor. Giuliani said, "We're not going to go to trial. We're just the tip of the iceberg", but no further charges were forthcoming and the investigation did not end until Giuliani's successor was in place. Giuliani's high-profile raid of the Princeton/Newport firm ended with the defendants having their cases overturned on appeal on the grounds that what they had been convicted of were not crimes.

==== Mafia Commission trial ====
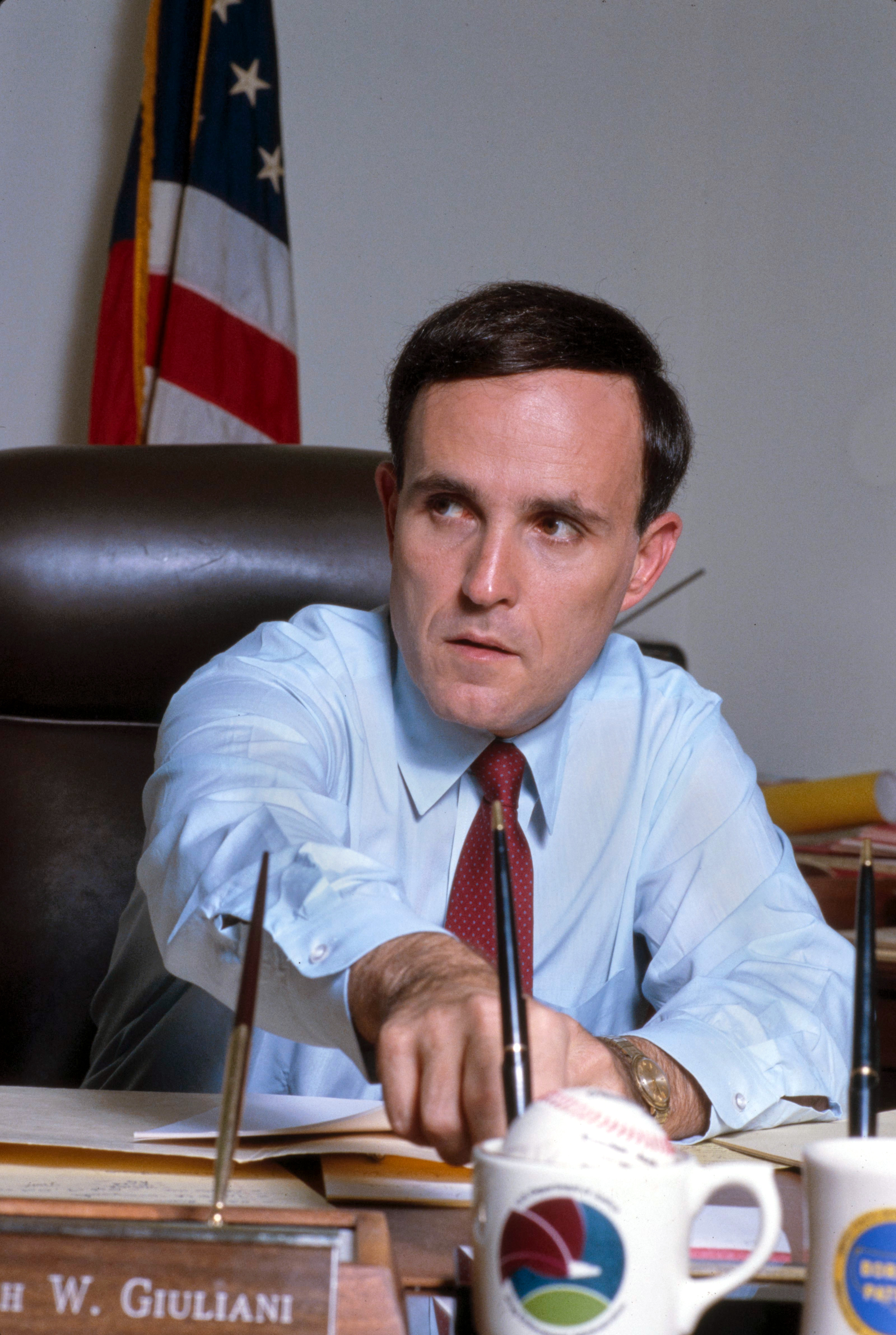
Giuliani as U.S. Attorney in 1984, as photographed by Bernard Gotfryd

In the Mafia Commission Trial, which ran from February 25, 1985, through November 19, 1986, Giuliani indicted eleven organized crime figures, including the heads of New York City's "Five Families", under the Racketeer Influenced and Corrupt Organizations Act (RICO) on charges including extortion, labor racketeering, and murder for hire. In 2001, Time magazine called this "case of cases" possibly "the most significant assault on the infrastructure of organized crime since the high command of the Chicago Mafia was swept away in 1943", and quoted Giuliani's stated intention: "Our approach is to wipe out the five families." Gambino crime family boss Paul Castellano evaded conviction when he and his underboss Thomas Bilotti were murdered on the streets of midtown Manhattan on December 16, 1985; however, three heads of the Five Families were sentenced to 100 years in prison on January 13, 1987.

Genovese and Colombo leaders, Tony Salerno and Carmine Persico, received additional sentences in separate trials, with 70-year and 39-year sentences to run consecutively. He was assisted by three assistant U.S. attorneys: Michael Chertoff, the eventual second U.S. Secretary of Homeland Security and co-author of the Patriot Act; John Savarese, now a partner at Wachtell Lipton Rosen & Katz; and Gil Childers, a later deputy chief of the criminal division for the Southern District of New York and now managing director in the legal department at Goldman Sachs. According to an FBI memo revealed in 2007, leaders of the Five Families voted in late 1986 on whether to issue a contract for Giuliani's death. Heads of the Lucchese, Bonanno, and Genovese families rejected the idea, although Colombo and Gambino leaders, Carmine Persico and John Gotti, encouraged assassination.

In 2014, it was revealed by former Sicilian Mafia member and informant Rosario Naimo that Salvatore Riina, a notorious Sicilian Mafia leader, had ordered a murder contract on Giuliani during the mid-1980s. Riina allegedly was suspicious of Giuliani's efforts prosecuting the American Mafia and was worried that he might have spoken with Italian anti-Mafia prosecutors and politicians, including Giovanni Falcone and Paolo Borsellino, who were both murdered in 1992 in separate car bombings. According to Giuliani, the Sicilian Mafia offered $800,000 for his death during his first year as mayor of New York in 1994.

==== Boesky and Milken trials ====
Ivan Boesky, a Wall Street arbitrageur who had amassed a fortune of about $200 million by betting on corporate takeovers, was originally investigated by the U.S. Securities and Exchange Commission (SEC) for making investments based on tips received from corporate insiders, leading the way for the U.S. Attorney's Office of the Southern District of New York to investigate as well. These stock and options acquisitions were sometimes brazen, with massive purchases occurring only a few days before a corporation announced a takeover. Although insider trading of this kind was illegal, laws prohibiting it were rarely enforced until Boesky was prosecuted. Boesky cooperated with the SEC and informed on several others, including junk bond trader Michael Milken. Per agreement with Giuliani, Boesky received a 3 1/2-year prison sentence along with a $100 million fine. In 1989, Giuliani charged Milken under the RICO Act with 98 counts of racketeering and fraud. In a highly publicized case, Milken was indicted by a grand jury on these charges.

=== Disbarment ===
In June 2021, Giuliani had his license to practice law suspended in the state of New York, pending an investigation related to his efforts to overturn the results of the 2020 presidential election. On July 2, 2024, he was disbarred in the state of New York. On September 26, 2024, he was disbarred in the District of Columbia under reciprocal discipline.

== Mayoral campaigns ==
Giuliani was U.S. attorney until January 1989, resigning as the Reagan administration ended. He garnered criticism until he left office for his handling of cases and was accused of prosecuting cases to further his political ambitions. He joined the law firm White & Case in New York City as a partner. He remained with White & Case until May 1990, when he joined the law firm Anderson Kill Olick & Oshinsky, also in New York City.

=== 1989 ===
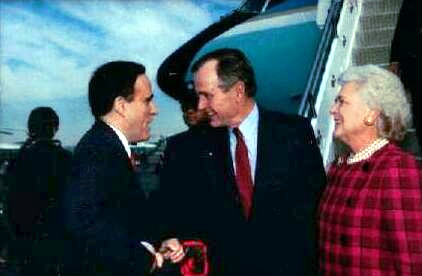
Giuliani greeting President George H. W. Bush and Barbara Bush in 1989

Giuliani first ran for New York City mayor in 1989, when he attempted to unseat three-term incumbent Ed Koch. He won the September 1989 Republican Party primary election against business magnate Ronald Lauder in a campaign marked by claims that Giuliani was a not a true Republican (RINO) after an acrimonious debate between the two men.

In the Democratic primary, Koch was upset by David Dinkins, who was Manhattan Borough president. In the general election, Giuliani ran as the fusion candidate of both the Republican and the Liberal parties. The Conservative Party, which had often co-lined the Republican party candidate, withheld support from Giuliani and ran Lauder instead. Conservative Party leaders were unhappy with Giuliani on ideological grounds. They cited the Liberal Party's endorsement statement that Giuliani "agreed with the Liberal Party's views on affirmative action, gay rights, gun control, school prayer, and tuition tax credits".

During two televised debates, Giuliani framed himself as an agent of change, saying, "I'm the reformer", that "If we keep going merrily along, this city's going down", and that electing Dinkins would represent "more of the same, more of the rotten politics that have been dragging us down". Giuliani pointed out that Dinkins had not filed a tax return for many years and several other ethical missteps, in particular a stock transfer to his son. Dinkins filed several years of returns and said the tax matter had been fully paid off. He denied other wrongdoing, saying that "what we need is a mayor, not a prosecutor" and that Giuliani refused to say "the R-word – he doesn't like to admit he's a Republican". Dinkins won the endorsements of three of the four major daily New York newspapers, while Giuliani won approval from the New York Post. In the end, Giuliani lost to Dinkins by a margin of 47,080 votes out of 1,899,845 votes cast, in what was the closest election in New York City's history. The closeness of the race was particularly noteworthy, considering the small percentage of New York City residents who were registered Republicans, and it resulted in Giuliani being the presumptive nominee for a rematch with Dinkins at the next election.

=== 1993 ===
Four years after his defeat to Dinkins, Giuliani again ran for mayor. Once again, Giuliani also ran on the Liberal Party line but not the Conservative Party line, which ran activist George Marlin. Although crime had begun to fall during the Dinkins administration, Giuliani's campaign capitalized on the perception that crime was uncontrolled in the city following events such as the Crown Heights riot and the Family Red Apple boycott. The year prior to the election, Giuliani was a key speaker at a Patrolmen's Benevolent Association rally opposing Dinkins, in which Giuliani blamed the police department's low morale on Dinkins' leadership. The rally quickly devolved into a riot, with nearly 4,000 off-duty police officers storming the City Hall and blocking traffic on the Brooklyn Bridge.

Dinkins and Giuliani never debated during the campaign, because they were never able to agree on how to approach a debate. Dinkins was endorsed by The New York Times and Newsday, while Giuliani was endorsed by the New York Post and the New York Daily News (a key switch from 1989). Giuliani went to visit the Lubavitcher Rebbe, Rabbi Menachem Mendel Schneerson, seeking his blessing and endorsement.

On election day, Giuliani's campaign hired off-duty cops, firefighters, and corrections officers to monitor polling places in Manhattan, Brooklyn, and the Bronx for cases of voter fraud. Despite objections from the Dinkins campaign, who said that the effort would intimidate Democratic voters, Police Commissioner Raymond Kelly assigned an additional 52 police captains and 3,500 officers to monitor the city's polling places. Giuliani won by a margin of 53,367 votes. He became the first Republican elected mayor of New York City since John Lindsay in 1965. Similar to the election four years prior, Giuliani performed particularly well in the white ethnic neighborhoods in Brooklyn, Queens, and Staten Island. Giuliani saw especially high returns in the borough of Staten Island, as a referendum to consider allowing the borough to secede from New York City was on the ballot.

=== 1997 ===
Giuliani's opponent in 1997 was Democratic Manhattan borough president Ruth Messinger, who had beaten Al Sharpton in the September 9, 1997, Democratic primary. In the general election, Giuliani once again had the Liberal Party and not the Conservative Party listing. Giuliani ran an aggressive campaign, parlaying his image as a tough leader who had cleaned up the city. Giuliani's popularity was at its highest point to date, with a late October 1997 Quinnipiac University Polling Institute poll showing him as having a 68 percent approval rating; 70 percent of New Yorkers were satisfied with life in the city and 64 percent said things were better in the city compared to four years previously.

Throughout the campaign, Giuliani was well ahead in the polls and had a strong fund-raising advantage over Messinger. On her part, Messinger lost the support of several usually Democratic constituencies, including gay organizations and large labor unions. The major local daily newspapers (The New York Times, Daily News, New York Post, and Newsday) all endorsed Giuliani over Messinger. In the end, Giuliani won 58% of the vote to Messinger's 41%, becoming the first registered Republican to win a second term as mayor while on the Republican line since Fiorello H. La Guardia in 1941. Voter turnout was the lowest in twelve years, with 38% of registered voters casting ballots. The margin of victory included gains in his share of the African American vote (20% compared to 1993's 5%) and the Hispanic vote (43% from 37%) while maintaining his base of white ethnic and Catholic and Jewish voters from 1993.

== Mayoralty ==
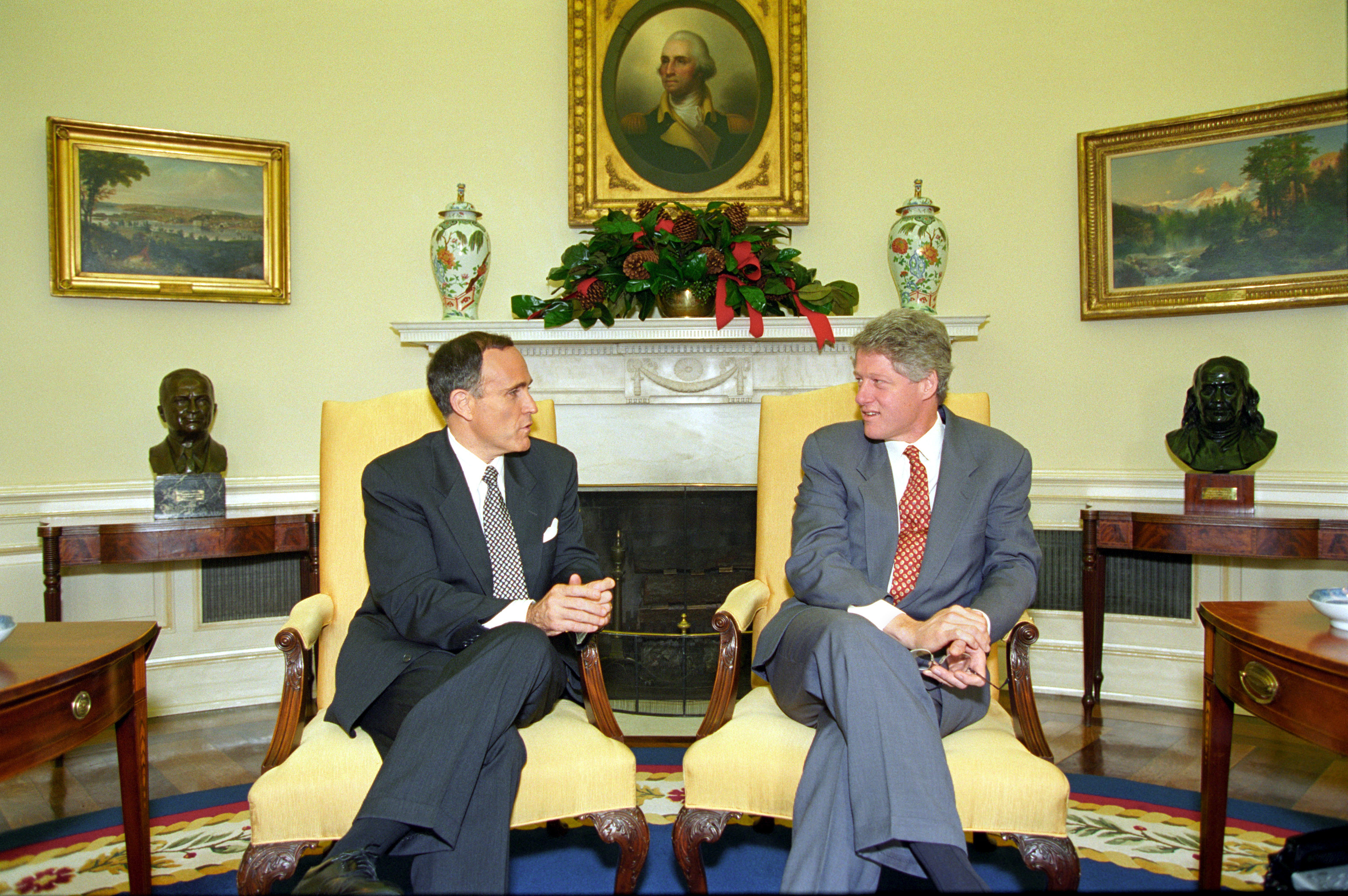
Giuliani with President Bill Clinton in 1993

=== Law enforcement ===
Giuliani served as mayor of New York City from 1994 to 2001. In his first term as mayor, the New York City Police Department (NYPD) – at the instigation of Commissioner Bill Bratton – adopted an aggressive enforcement/deterrent strategy based on James Q. Wilson's "broken windows" approach. This involved crackdowns on relatively minor offenses such as graffiti, turnstile jumping, cannabis possession, and aggressive panhandling by "squeegee men", on the theory that this would send a message that order would be maintained.

The legal underpinning for removing the "squeegee men" from the streets was developed under Giuliani's predecessor David Dinkins. Bratton, with Deputy Commissioner Jack Maple, also created and instituted CompStat, a computer-driven comparative statistical approach to mapping crime geographically and in terms of emerging criminal patterns, as well as charting officer performance by quantifying criminal apprehensions. Critics of the system assert that it creates an environment in which police officials are encouraged to underreport or otherwise manipulate crime data. An extensive study found a high correlation between crime rates reported by the police through CompStat and rates of crime available from other sources, suggesting there had been no manipulation. The CompStat initiative won the 1996 Innovations in Government Award from Harvard Kennedy School.

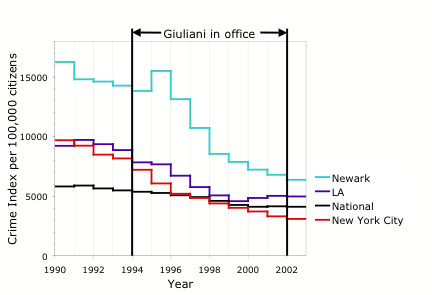
National, New York City, and other major city crime rates (1990–2002)

During Giuliani's administration, crime rates dropped in New York City. The extent to which Giuliani deserves the credit is disputed. Crime rates in New York City had started to drop in 1991 under Dinkins, three years before Giuliani took office. A small nationwide drop in crime preceded Giuliani's election, and some critics say he may have been the beneficiary of a trend already in progress. Additional contributing factors to the overall decline in New York City crime during the 1990s were the addition of 7,000 officers to the NYPD, lobbied for and hired by the Dinkins administration, and an overall improvement in the national economy.

Changing demographics were a key factor contributing to crime rate reductions, which were similar across the country during this time. Because the crime index is based on that of the FBI, which is self-reported by police departments, some have alleged that crimes were shifted into categories the FBI does not collect. In his 2006 book The Great American Crime Decline, sociologist Frank Zimring stated that "up to half of New York's crime drop in the 1990s, and virtually 100 percent of its continuing crime decline since 2000, has resulted from policing."

Bratton was featured on the cover of Time magazine in 1996. Giuliani reportedly forced Bratton out after two years, in what was seen as a battle of two large egos in which Giuliani was not tolerant of Bratton's celebrity. Bratton went on to become chief of the Los Angeles Police Department. Giuliani's term also saw allegations of civil rights abuses and other police misconduct under other commissioners after Bratton's departure. There were police shootings of unarmed suspects, and the scandals surrounding the torture of Abner Louima and the killings of Amadou Diallo, Gidone Busch, and Patrick Dorismond. Giuliani supported the NYPD, for example by releasing what he called Dorismond's "extensive criminal record" to the public, including a sealed juvenile file.

=== City services ===
The Giuliani administration advocated the privatization of the city's public schools, which he called "dysfunctional", and the reduction of state funding for them. He advocated a voucher-based system to promote private schooling. Giuliani supported protection for illegal immigrants. He continued a policy of preventing city employees from contacting the Immigration and Naturalization Service about immigration violations, on the grounds that illegal immigrants should be able to take actions such as sending their children to school or reporting crimes to the police without fear of deportation. During his mayoralty, gay and lesbian New Yorkers received domestic partnership rights. Giuliani induced the city's Democratic-controlled New York City Council, which had avoided the issue for years, to pass legislation providing broad protection for same-sex partners. In 1998, he codified local law by granting all city employees equal benefits for their domestic partners.

=== 2000 U.S. Senate campaign ===
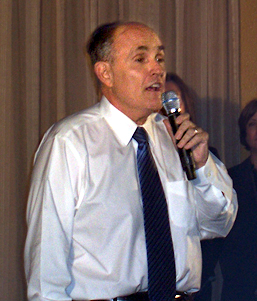
Giuliani campaigned for Senate in 2000 before withdrawing after being diagnosed with cancer.

With term limits, Giuliani was ineligible to run in 2001 for a third term as mayor. In November 1998, four-term incumbent Democratic U.S. senator Daniel Patrick Moynihan announced his retirement and Giuliani immediately indicated an interest in running in the 2000 election for the now-open seat. Because of his high profile and visibility, Giuliani was supported by the state Republican Party. Giuliani's entrance led Democratic congressman Charles Rangel and others to recruit then-First Lady Hillary Clinton to run for Moynihan's seat, hoping she might combat his star power.

In April 1999, Giuliani formed an exploratory committee in connection with the Senate run. By January 2000, polling for the race showed Giuliani nine points ahead of Clinton, in part because his campaign was able to take advantage of several campaign stumbles by Clinton. In March 2000, the New York Police Department's fatal shooting of Patrick Dorismond inflamed Giuliani's strained relations with the city's minority communities, and Clinton seized on it as a major campaign issue. By April 2000, reports showed Clinton gaining upstate and generally outworking Giuliani, who said his duties as mayor prevented him from campaigning more. Clinton was now eight to ten points ahead of Giuliani in the polls.

Then followed four tumultuous weeks in which Giuliani learned he had prostate cancer and needed treatment; his extramarital relationship with Judith Nathan became public and the subject of a media frenzy; and he announced a separation from his wife Donna Hanover. After much indecision, on May 19, Giuliani announced his withdrawal from the Senate race.

=== September 11 terrorist attacks ===
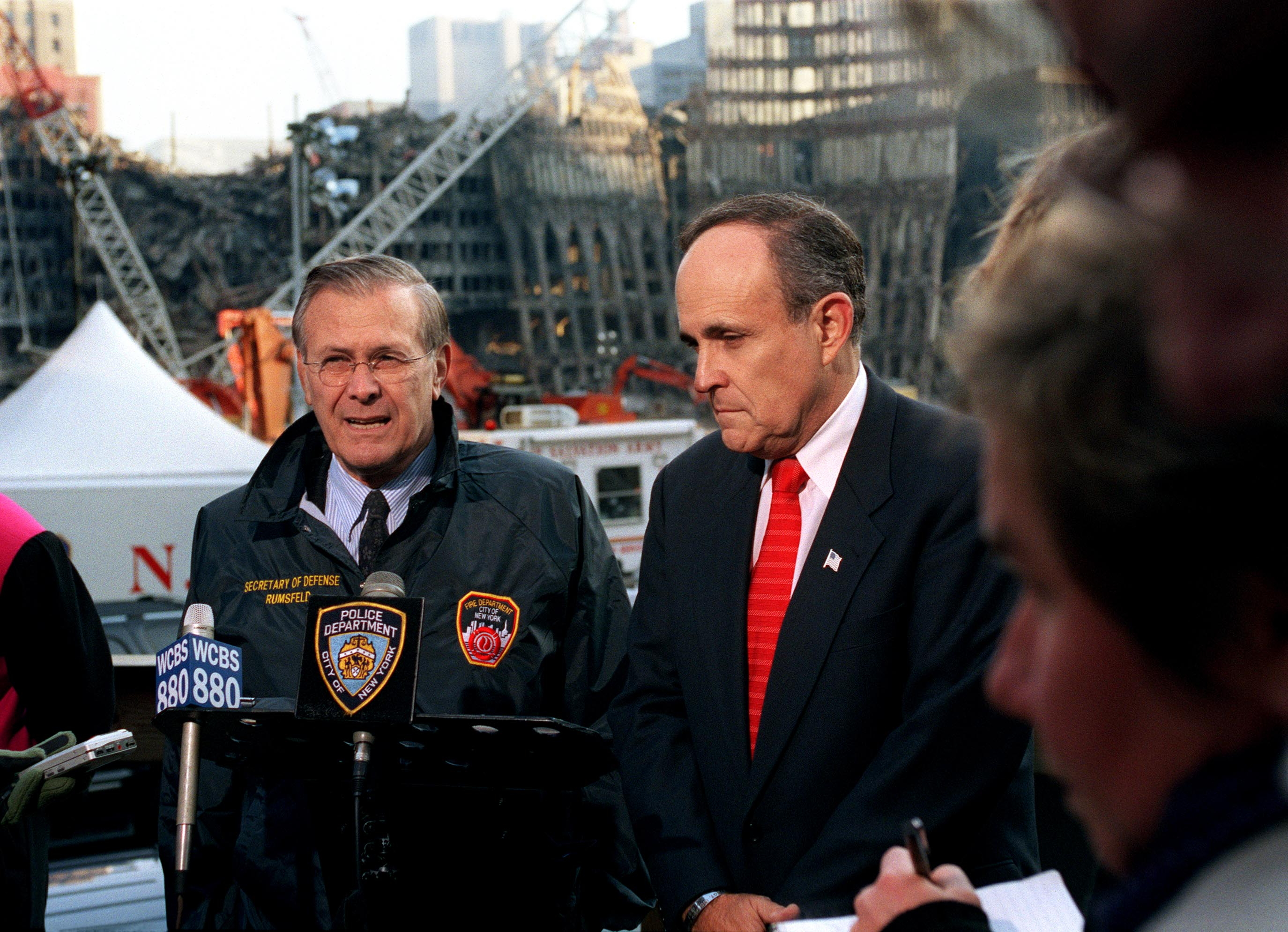
Donald Rumsfeld and Giuliani at the site of the World Trade Center on November 14, 2001

==== Response ====
Giuliani received nationwide attention in the aftermath of the September 11 attacks. He made frequent appearances on radio and television on September 11 and afterwards – for example, to indicate that tunnels would be closed as a precautionary measure, and that there was no reason to believe the dispersion of chemical or biological weaponry into the air was a factor in the attack. In his public statements, Giuliani said:

Tomorrow New York is going to be here. And we're going to rebuild, and we're going to be stronger than we were before ... I want the people of New York to be an example to the rest of the country, and the rest of the world, that terrorism can't stop us.

The 9/11 attacks occurred on the scheduled date of the mayoral primary to select the Democratic and Republican candidates to succeed Giuliani. The primary was immediately delayed two weeks to September 25. During this period, Giuliani sought an unprecedented three-month emergency extension of his term from January 1 to April 1 under the New York State Constitution (Article 3, Section 25). In October 2000, he had considered supporting city council efforts to remove their own term limits, although he was not in favor of ending consecutive mayoral term limits.

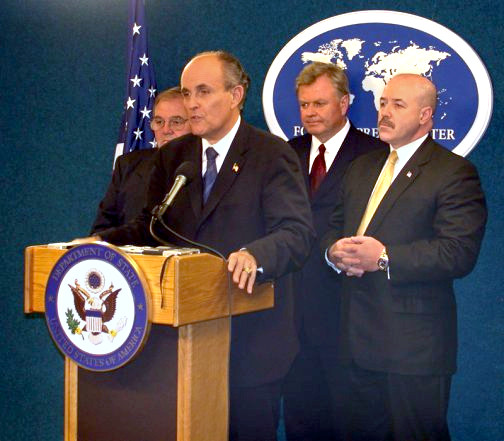
Giuliani at a NYFPC briefing after 9/11

In the end, leaders in the State Assembly and Senate indicated that they did not believe the extension was necessary. The election proceeded as scheduled, and the winning candidate, the Giuliani-endorsed Republican convert Michael Bloomberg, took office on January 1, 2002, per normal custom. Giuliani said he had been at the Ground Zero site "as often, if not more, than most workers ... I was there working with them. I was exposed to exactly the same things they were exposed to. So in that sense, I'm one of them." Some 9/11 workers have objected to those claims. While his appointment logs were unavailable for the six days immediately following the attacks, Giuliani logged 29 hours at the site over three months beginning September 17. This contrasted with recovery workers at the site who spent this much time at the site in two to three days.

When Saudi prince Alwaleed bin Talal suggested the attacks were an indication that the United States "should re-examine its policies in the Middle East and adopt a more balanced stand toward the Palestinian cause", Giuliani asserted, "There is no moral equivalent for this act. There is no justification for it ... And one of the reasons I think this happened is because people were engaged in moral equivalency in not understanding the difference between liberal democracies like the United States, like Israel, and terrorist states and those who condone terrorism. So I think not only are those statements wrong, they're part of the problem." Giuliani subsequently rejected the prince's $10 million donation to disaster relief in the aftermath of the attack.

==== Criticism and communications problems ====
Giuliani was widely criticized for his decision to locate the New York City Office of Emergency Management headquarters on the 23rd floor inside the 7 World Trade Center building. Those opposing the decision perceived the office as a target for a terrorist attack in light of the World Trade Center bombing in 1993. The office was unable to coordinate efforts between police and firefighters properly while evacuating its headquarters. Large tanks of diesel fuel were placed in 7 World Trade to power the command center. In May 1997, Giuliani put responsibility for selecting the location on Jerome M. Hauer, who had served under Giuliani from 1996 to 2000 before being appointed by him as New York City's first director of emergency management. Hauer has taken exception to that account in interviews and provided Fox News and New York Magazine with a memo demonstrating that he recommended a location in Brooklyn but was overruled by Giuliani. Television journalist Chris Wallace interviewed Giuliani on May 13, 2007, about his 1997 decision to locate the command center at the World Trade Center. Giuliani laughed during Wallace's questions and said that Hauer recommended the World Trade Center site and that Hauer said the WTC site was the best location. Wallace presented Giuliani a photocopy of Hauer's directive letter. The letter urged Giuliani to locate the command center in Brooklyn, instead of lower Manhattan. The February 1996 memo read, "The [Brooklyn] building is secure and not as visible a target as buildings in Lower Manhattan."

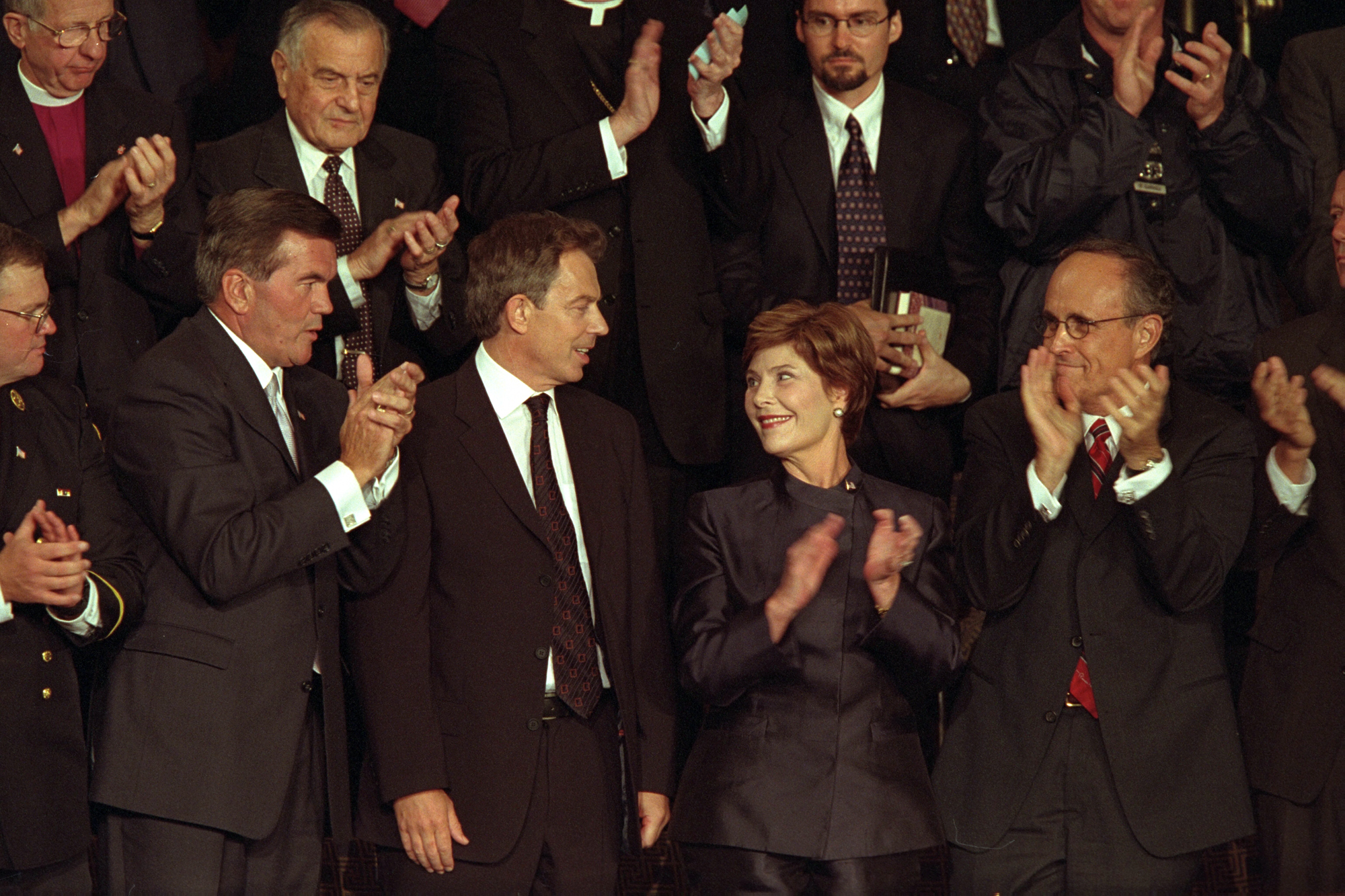
Giuliani, on right, at a joint session of Congress on September 20, 2001, in which President Bush praised his efforts as mayor and named Tom Ridge to a new cabinet-level position to oversee homeland defense initiatives

The 9/11 Commission Report noted that lack of preparedness could have led to the deaths of first responders at the scene of the attacks. The commission noted that the radios in use by the fire department were the same radios which had been criticized for their ineffectiveness following the 1993 World Trade Center bombings. Family members of 9/11 victims have said these radios were a complaint of emergency services responders for years. The radios were not working when Fire Department chiefs ordered the 343 firefighters inside the towers to evacuate, and they remained in the towers as the towers collapsed.

When Giuliani testified before the 9/11 Commission, he said the firefighters ignored the evacuation order out of an effort to save lives. Giuliani testified to the commission, where some family members of responders who had died in the attacks appeared to protest his statements. A 1994 mayoral office study of the radios indicated that they were faulty. Replacement radios were purchased in a $33 million no-bid contract with Motorola, and implemented in early 2001; however, the radios were recalled in March 2001 after a probationary firefighter's calls for help at a house fire could not be picked up by others at the scene, leaving firemen with the old analog radios from 1993. A book later published by commission members Thomas Kean and Lee H. Hamilton, Without Precedent: The Inside Story of the 9/11 Commission, argued that the commission had not pursued a tough enough line of questioning with Giuliani.

An October 2001 study by the National Institute of Environmental Safety and Health said cleanup workers lacked adequate protective gear. In January 2008, an eight-page memo was revealed which detailed the New York City Police Department's opposition in 1998 to the location of the city's emergency command center at the Trade Center site. The Giuliani administration overrode these concerns.

==== Public reaction ====
Giuliani gained international attention after the attacks and was widely hailed for his leadership role. Polls taken just six weeks after the attack showed a 79 percent approval rating among New York City voters. This was a dramatic increase over the 36 percent rating he had received a year earlier, which was an average at the end of a two-term mayorship. Oprah Winfrey called him "America's Mayor" at a 9/11 memorial service held at Yankee Stadium on September 23, 2001.

Giuliani was praised by some for his close involvement with the rescue and recovery efforts, but others argue that "Giuliani has exaggerated the role he played after the terrorist attacks, casting himself as a hero for political gain." Giuliani has collected $11.4 million from speaking fees in a single year (with increased demand after the attacks). Before September 11, Giuliani's assets were estimated to be somewhat less than $2 million, but his net worth could now be as high as 30 times that amount. He has made most of his money since leaving office.

==== Time Person of the Year ====
On December 24, 2001, Time magazine named Giuliani its Person of the Year for 2001. Time observed that, before 9/11, Giuliani's public image had been that of a rigid, self-righteous, ambitious politician. After 9/11, and perhaps owing also to his bout with prostate cancer, his public image became that of a man who could be counted on to unite a city in the midst of its greatest crisis. Historian Vincent J. Cannato concluded in September 2006:

With time, Giuliani's legacy will be based on more than just 9/11. He left a city immeasurably better off – safer, more prosperous, more confident – than the one he had inherited eight years earlier, even with the smoldering ruins of the World Trade Center at its heart. Debates about his accomplishments will continue, but the significance of his mayoralty is hard to deny.

==== Aftermath ====
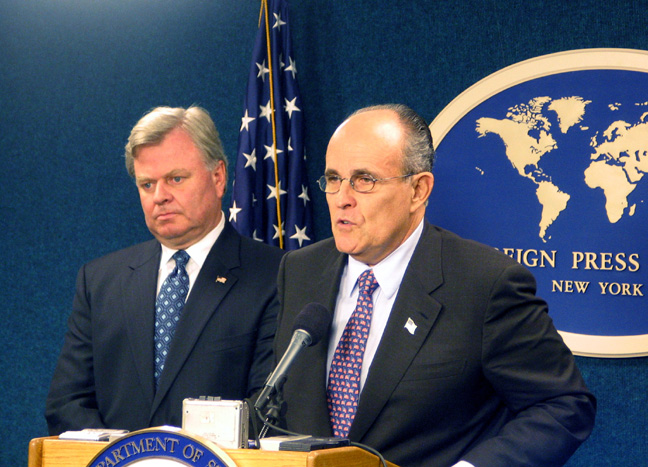
Thomas Von Essen and Giuliani at the New York Foreign Press Center Briefing on "New York City After September 11, 2001"

For his leadership on and after September 11, Giuliani was given an honorary knighthood (KBE) by Queen Elizabeth II on February 13, 2002. Giuliani initially downplayed the health effects arising from the September 11 attacks in the Financial District and lower Manhattan areas in the vicinity of the World Trade Center site. He moved quickly to reopen Wall Street, and it was reopened on September 17. In the first month after the attacks, he said "The air quality is safe and acceptable."

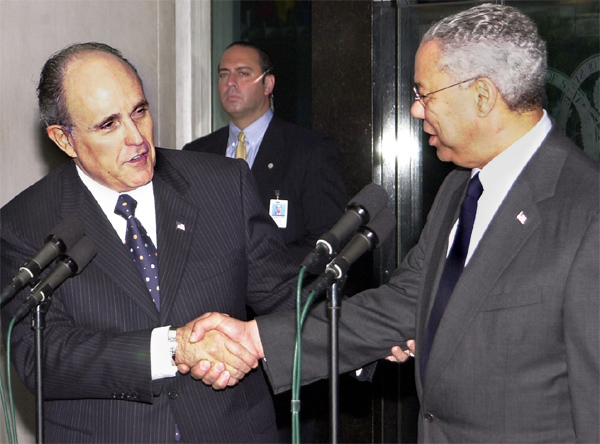
Giuliani and Secretary of State Colin Powell at the U.S. Delegation to OSCE's Anti-Semitism Meeting in Vienna, Austria, in 2003

Giuliani took control away from agencies such as the Federal Emergency Management Agency, the U.S. Army Corps of Engineers and the Occupational Safety and Health Administration, leaving the "largely unknown" city Department of Design and Construction in charge of recovery and cleanup. Documents indicate that the Giuliani administration never enforced federal requirements requiring the wearing of respirators. Concurrently, the administration threatened companies with dismissal if cleanup work slowed.

In June 2007, Christie Todd Whitman, former Republican governor of New Jersey and director of the Environmental Protection Agency (EPA), reportedly said the EPA had pushed for workers at the WTC site to wear respirators but she had been blocked by Giuliani. She said she believed the subsequent lung disease and deaths suffered by WTC responders were a result of these actions; however, former deputy mayor Joe Lhota, then with the Giuliani campaign, replied, "All workers at Ground Zero were instructed repeatedly to wear their respirators." Giuliani asked the city's Congressional delegation to limit the city's liability for Ground Zero illnesses to a total of $350 million. Two years after Giuliani finished his term, FEMA appropriated $1 billion to a special insurance fund, called the World Trade Center Captive Insurance Company, to protect the city against 9/11 lawsuits.

In February 2007, the International Association of Fire Fighters issued a letter asserting that Giuliani rushed to conclude the recovery effort once gold and silver had been recovered from World Trade Center vaults and thereby prevented the remains of many victims from being recovered. The letter stated "Mayor Giuliani's actions meant that fire fighters and citizens who perished would either remain buried at Ground Zero forever, with no closure for families, or be removed like garbage and deposited at the Fresh Kills Landfill, before adding: "Hundreds remained entombed in Ground Zero when Giuliani gave up on them." Lawyers for the International Association of Fire Fighters seek to interview Giuliani under oath as part of a federal legal action alleging that New York City negligently dumped body parts and other human remains in the Fresh Kills Landfill.

== Political career, 2002–2015 ==
=== Before 2008 election ===
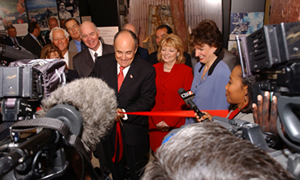
Giuliani cutting the ribbon of the new Drug Enforcement Administration mobile museum in Dallas, Texas, in September 2003

Since leaving office as mayor, Giuliani has remained politically active by campaigning for Republican candidates for political offices. When George Pataki became governor in 1995, this represented the first time the positions of mayor and governor were held simultaneously by Republicans since John Lindsay and Nelson Rockefeller. Giuliani and Pataki were instrumental in bringing the 2004 Republican National Convention to New York City. He was a speaker at the convention, and endorsed President George W. Bush for re-election by recalling that immediately after the World Trade Center towers fell, stating: "Without really thinking, based on just emotion, spontaneous, I grabbed the arm of then-Police Commissioner Bernard Kerik, and I said to him, 'Bernie, thank God George Bush is our president.'"

In 2006, Giuliani started a website called Solutions America to help elect Republican candidates. After campaigning on Bush's behalf in the 2004 U.S. presidential election, he was reportedly the top choice for U.S. Secretary of Homeland Security after Tom Ridge's resignation. When suggestions were made that Giuliani's confirmation hearings would be marred by details of his past affairs and scandals, he turned down the offer and instead recommended his friend and former New York police commissioner Bernard Kerik. After the announcement of Kerik's nomination, information about Kerik's past – that he had: ties to organized crime, failed to properly report gifts he had received, been sued for sexual harassment and employed an undocumented alien as a domestic servant – became known, and Kerik withdrew.

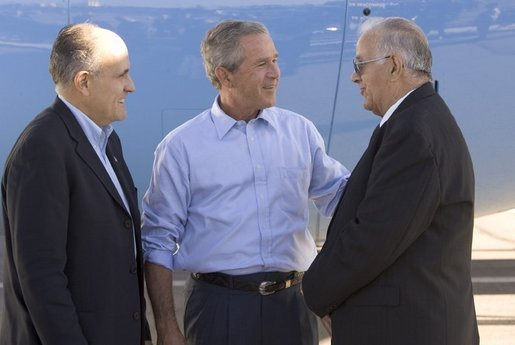
Giuliani and President George W. Bush in Las Cruces, New Mexico, on August 26, 2004

In March 2006, Congress formed the Iraq Study Group (ISG). This bipartisan ten-person panel, of which Giuliani was a member, was charged with assessing the Iraq War and making recommendations. They unanimously concluded that contrary to Bush administration assertions, "The situation in Iraq is grave and deteriorating" and called for "changes in the primary mission" that would allow "the United States to begin to move its forces out of Iraq".

In May 2006, after missing all ISG's meetings, including a briefing from General David Petraeus, former secretary of state Colin Powell and former Army chief of staff Eric Shinseki, Giuliani resigned, citing "previous time commitments". Giuliani's fundraising schedule had kept him from participating in the panel, a schedule which raised $11 million in speaking fees over fourteen months, and that Giuliani had been forced to resign after being given "an ultimatum to either show up...or leave" by group leader James Baker. Giuliani subsequently said he had started thinking about running for president, and being on the panel might give it a political spin. Giuliani was described by Newsweek in January 2007 as "one of the most consistent cheerleaders for the president's handling of the war in Iraq". As of June 2007, he remained one of the few candidates for president to unequivocally support the basis for 2003 invasion of Iraq and the execution of the war.

In 2010, Giuliani spoke in support of the removal of the People's Mojahedin Organization of Iran (MEK) from the U.S. State Department list of Foreign Terrorist Organizations; the MEK was removed from the list in 2012. As Giuliani and others reportedly received tens of thousands of dollars in speaking fees to advocate for the MEK, which at that time was still a designed terrorist organization, and thus their advocacy was illegal, some were subpoenaed during an inquiry about who was paying the prominent individuals' speaking fees. Several commentators wrote that under the PATRIOT Act these people could be potentially prosecuted for providing material support for terrorism, a claim Giuliani denied. In January 2011, Giuliani and others wrote an article for the conservative publication National Review stating their position that the group should not be classified as a terrorist organization. They supported their position by citing the fact that the United Kingdom and European Union had removed it from their terrorism lists. They further asserted that only the United States and Iran still listed it.

=== 2008 presidential campaign ===
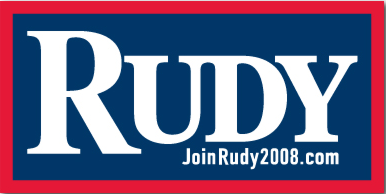
Presidential campaign logo

In November 2006, Giuliani announced the formation of an exploratory committee toward a run in the 2008 U.S. presidential election. In February 2007, he filed a "statement of candidacy" and confirmed on the television program Larry King Live that he was running.

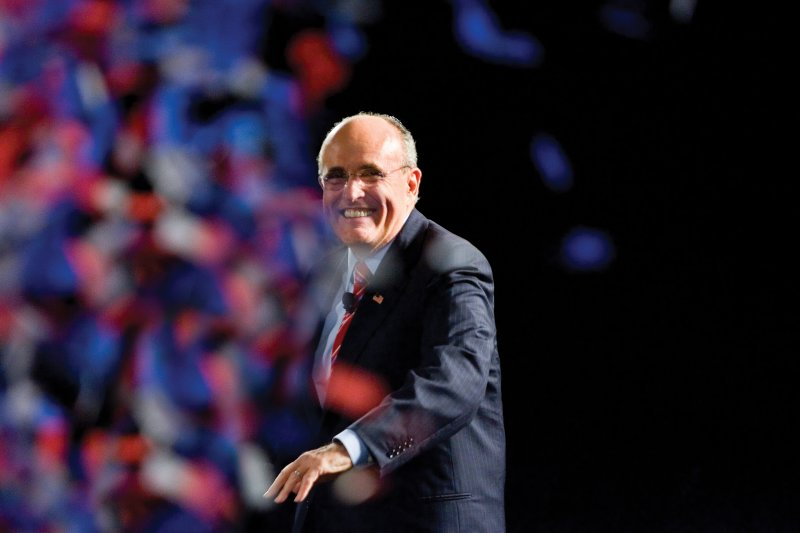
Giuliani at a rally at San Diego State University in August 2007 when polls showed him as the front-runner for the Republican party's nomination

Early polls showed Giuliani with one of the highest levels of name recognition ever recorded along with high levels of support among the Republican candidates. Throughout most of 2007, he was the leader in most nationwide opinion polling among Republicans. Senator John McCain, who ranked a close second behind the New York Mayor, had faded, and most polls showed Giuliani to have more support than any of the other declared Republican candidates, with only former senator Fred Thompson and former governor Mitt Romney showing greater support in some per-state Republican polls. On November 7, 2007, Giuliani's campaign received an endorsement from evangelist, Christian Broadcasting Network founder, and past presidential candidate Pat Robertson. This was viewed by political observers as a possibly key development in the race, as it gave credence that evangelicals and other social conservatives could support Giuliani despite some of his positions on social issues such as abortion and gay rights.

Giuliani's campaign hit a difficult stretch during the last two months of 2007, when Bernard Kerik, whom Giuliani had recommended for the position of secretary of homeland security, was indicted on 16 counts of tax fraud and other federal charges. The media reported that when Giuliani was the mayor of New York, he billed several tens of thousands of dollars of mayoral security expenses to obscure city agencies. Those expenses were incurred while he visited Judith Nathan, with whom he was having an extramarital affair; later analysis showed the billing to likely be unrelated to hiding Nathan. Several stories were published in the press regarding clients of Giuliani Partners and Bracewell & Giuliani who were in opposition to goals of American foreign policy. Giuliani's national poll numbers began steadily slipping and his unusual strategy of focusing more on later, multi-primary big states rather than the smaller, first-voting states was seen at risk.

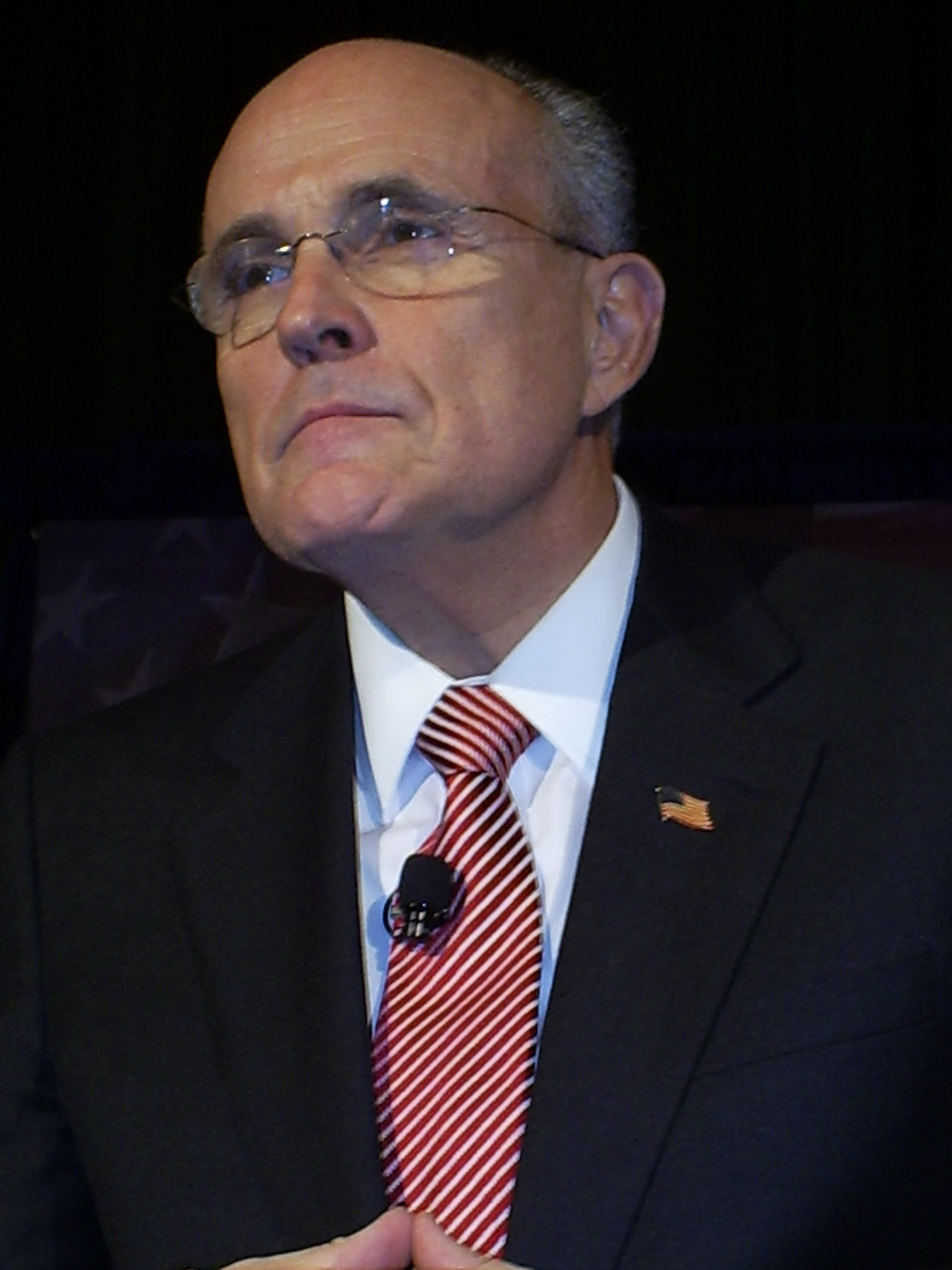
Giuliani at a campaign event in Derry, New Hampshire, the day before the New Hampshire primary

Despite his strategy, Giuliani competed in the January 8, 2008, New Hampshire primary to a substantial extent, but finished a distant fourth with 9 percent of the vote. Similar poor results continued in other early contests, when Giuliani's staff went without pay to focus all efforts on the crucial late January Florida Republican primary. The shift of the electorate's focus from national security to the state of the economy also hurt Giuliani, as did the resurgence of McCain's similarly themed campaign. On January 29, 2008, Giuliani finished a distant third in the Florida result with 15 percent of the vote, trailing McCain and Romney. Facing declining polls and lost leads in the upcoming large Super Tuesday states, including that of his home New York, Giuliani withdrew from the race on January 30, endorsing McCain.

Giuliani's campaign ended up $3.6 million in arrears, and in June 2008 Giuliani sought to retire the debt by proposing to appear at Republican fundraisers during the 2008 general election, and have part of the proceeds go towards his campaign. During the 2008 Republican National Convention, Giuliani gave a prime-time speech that praised McCain and his running mate, Sarah Palin, while criticizing Democratic nominee Barack Obama. He cited Palin's executive experience as a mayor and governor and belittled Obama's lack of same, and his remarks were met with wild applause from the delegates. Giuliani continued to be one of McCain's most active surrogates during the remainder of McCain's eventually unsuccessful campaign.

=== After 2008 election ===
Following the end of his presidential campaign, Giuliani's "high appearance fees dropped like a stone". He returned to work at both Giuliani Partners and Bracewell & Giuliani. His consultancy work included advising Keiko Fujimori with her presidential campaign during the 2011 Peruvian general election. Giuliani also explored hosting a syndicated radio show, and was reported to be in talks with Westwood One about replacing Bill O'Reilly before that position went to Fred Thompson (another unsuccessful 2008 GOP presidential primary candidate). In 2009, Giuliani said the Obama administration and U.S. Treasury Secretary Timothy Geithner lacked executive competence in dealing with the 2008 financial crisis.

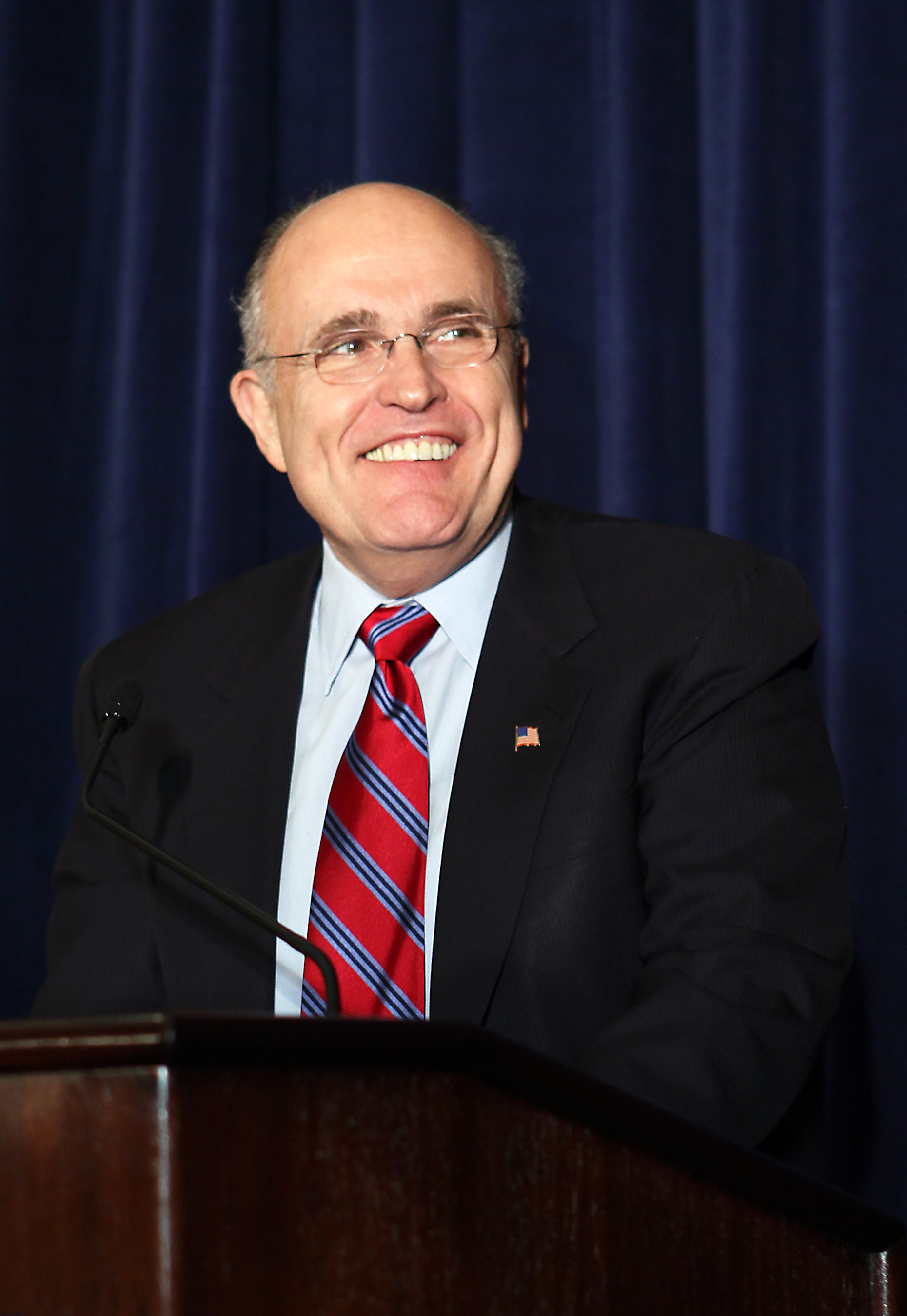
Giuliani gives the keynote speech at the Jumeriah Essex House in honor of the USS New York sailors and Special Purpose Marine Air Ground Task Force 26 Marines on November 8, 2009.

Giuliani said his political career was not necessarily over, and did not rule out a 2010 New York gubernatorial or 2012 presidential bid. A November 2008 Siena College poll indicated that although Governor David Paterson – promoted to the office via the Eliot Spitzer prostitution scandal a year before – was popular among New Yorkers, he would have just a slight lead over Giuliani in a hypothetical matchup. By February 2009, after the prolonged Senate appointment process, a Siena College poll indicated that Paterson was losing popularity among New Yorkers, and showed Giuliani with a fifteen-point lead in the hypothetical contest.

In January 2009, Giuliani said he would not decide on a gubernatorial run for another six to eight months, adding that he thought it would not be fair to the governor to start campaigning early while the governor tries to focus on his job. Giuliani worked to retire his presidential campaign debt, but by the end of March 2009 it was still $2.4 million in arrears, the largest such remaining amount for any of the 2008 contenders. In April 2009, Giuliani strongly opposed Paterson's announced push for same-sex marriage in New York and said it would likely cause a backlash that could put Republicans in statewide office in 2010. By late August 2009, there were still conflicting reports about whether Giuliani was likely to run.

On December 23, 2009, Giuliani announced that he would not seek any office in 2010, saying "The main reason has to do with my two enterprises: Bracewell & Giuliani and Giuliani Partners. I'm very busy in both." The decisions signaled a possible end to Giuliani's political career. During the 2010 midterm elections, Giuliani endorsed and campaigned for Bob Ehrlich and Marco Rubio. On October 11, 2011, Giuliani announced that he was not running for president. According to Kevin Law, the director of the Long Island Association, Giuliani believed, "As a moderate, he thought it was a pretty significant challenge. He said it's tough to be a moderate and succeed in GOP primaries", and Giuliani himself said, "If it's too late for (New Jersey Governor) Chris Christie, it's too late for me."

At a Republican fund-raising event in February 2015, Giuliani said, "I do not believe, and I know this is a horrible thing to say, but I do not believe that the president Obama loves America ... He doesn't love you. And he doesn't love me. He wasn't brought up the way you were brought up and I was brought up, through love of this country." In response to criticism of the remarks, Giuliani said, "Some people thought it was racist – I thought that was a joke, since he was brought up by a white mother ... This isn't racism. This is socialism or possibly anti-colonialism." White House deputy press secretary Eric Schultz said he agreed with Giuliani "that it was a horrible thing to say", but he would leave it up to the people who heard Giuliani directly to assess whether the remarks were appropriate for the event. Although he received some support for his controversial comments, Giuliani said he also received several death threats within 48 hours.

== First Trump presidency ==
=== Relationship with Donald Trump ===
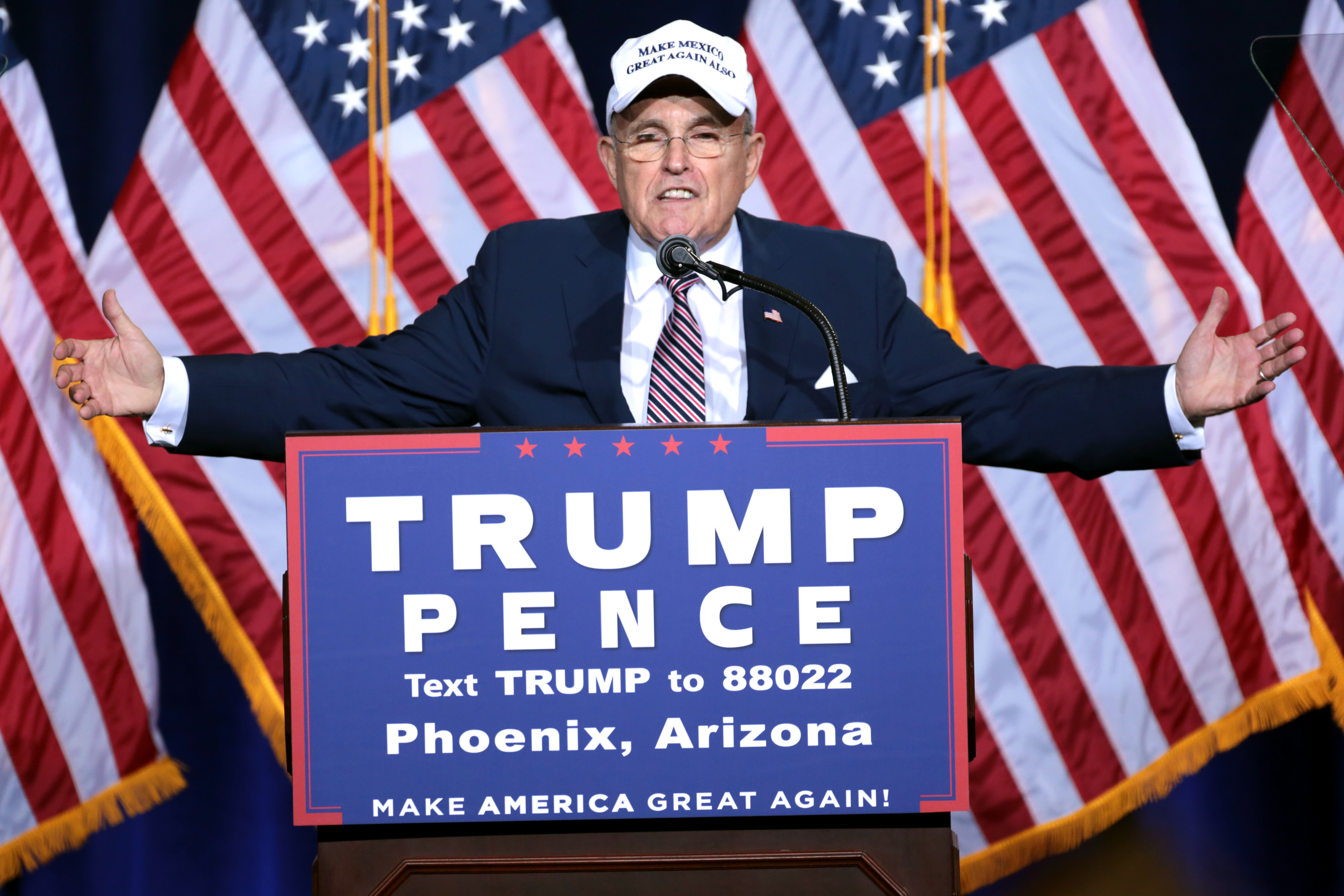
Giuliani speaking at a campaign event for Republican presidential nominee Donald Trump on August 31, 2016

==== Presidential campaign supporter ====
Giuliani supported Donald Trump in the 2016 U.S. presidential election. He gave a prime time speech during the first night of the 2016 Republican National Convention. Earlier in the day, Giuliani and former 2016 presidential candidate Ben Carson appeared at an event for the pro-Trump Great America PAC. Giuliani also appeared in a Great America PAC ad entitled "Leadership". Giuliani's and Jeff Sessions' appearances were staples at Trump campaign rallies. During the campaign, Giuliani praised Trump for his worldwide accomplishments and helping fellow New Yorkers in their time of need. He defended Trump against allegations of racism, sexual assault, and not paying any federal income taxes for as long as two decades.

In August 2016, Giuliani, while campaigning for Trump, said that in the "eight years before Obama" became president, "we didn't have any successful radical Islamic terrorist attack in the United States". It was noted that 9/11 happened during George W. Bush's first term. PolitiFact brought up four more counter-examples (the 2002 Los Angeles International Airport shooting, the 2002 D.C. sniper attacks, the 2006 Seattle Jewish Federation shooting and the 2006 UNC SUV attack) to Giuliani's claim. Giuliani later said he was using "abbreviated language". Giuliani was believed to be a likely pick for secretary of state in the Trump administration. On December 9, 2016, Trump announced that Giuliani had removed his name from consideration for any Cabinet post.

==== Advisor to the president ====
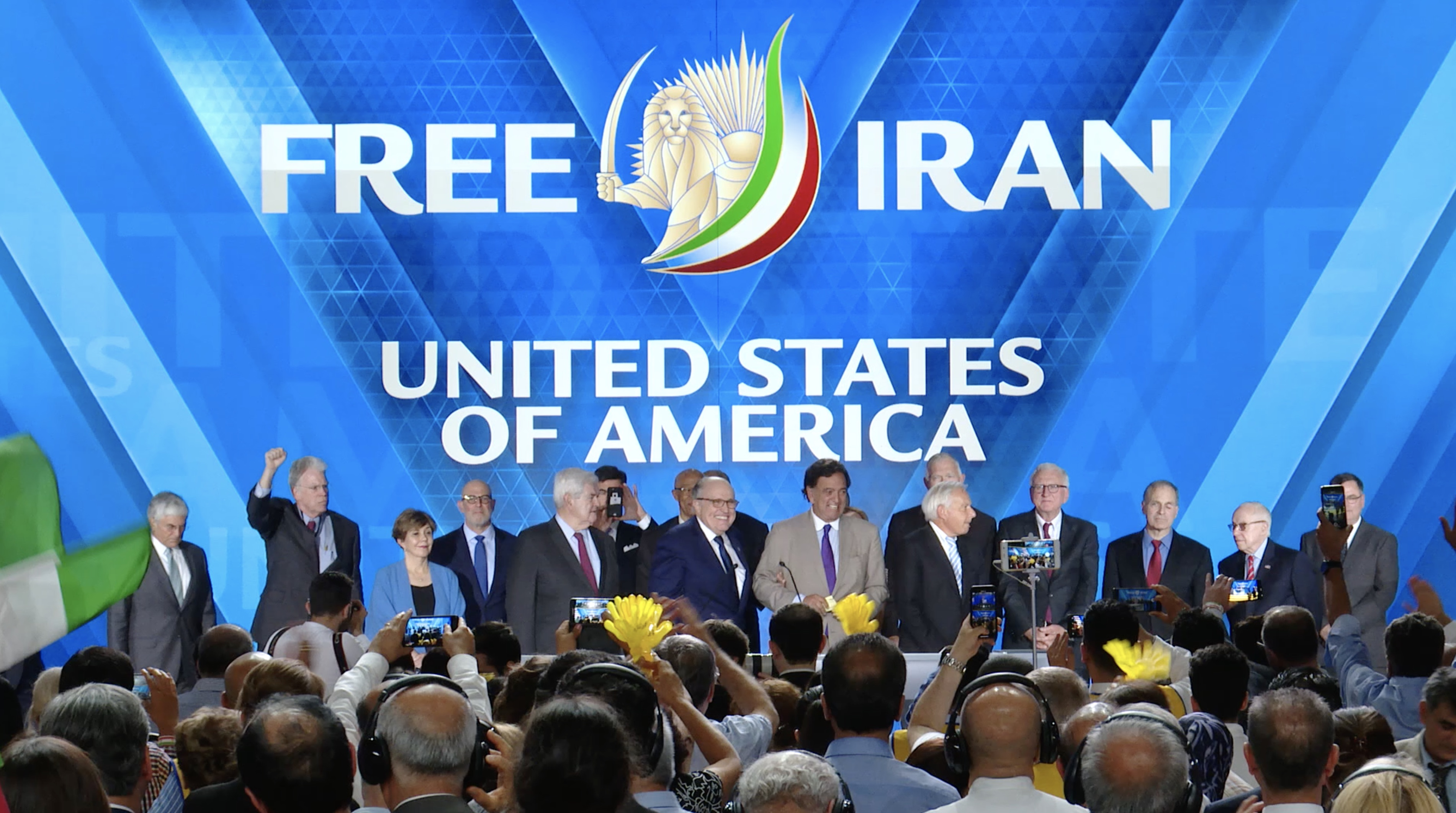
Giuliani with Newt Gingrich, James T. Conway, Bill Richardson, and other American politicians at the People's Mujahedin of Iran (PMOI) event in 2018

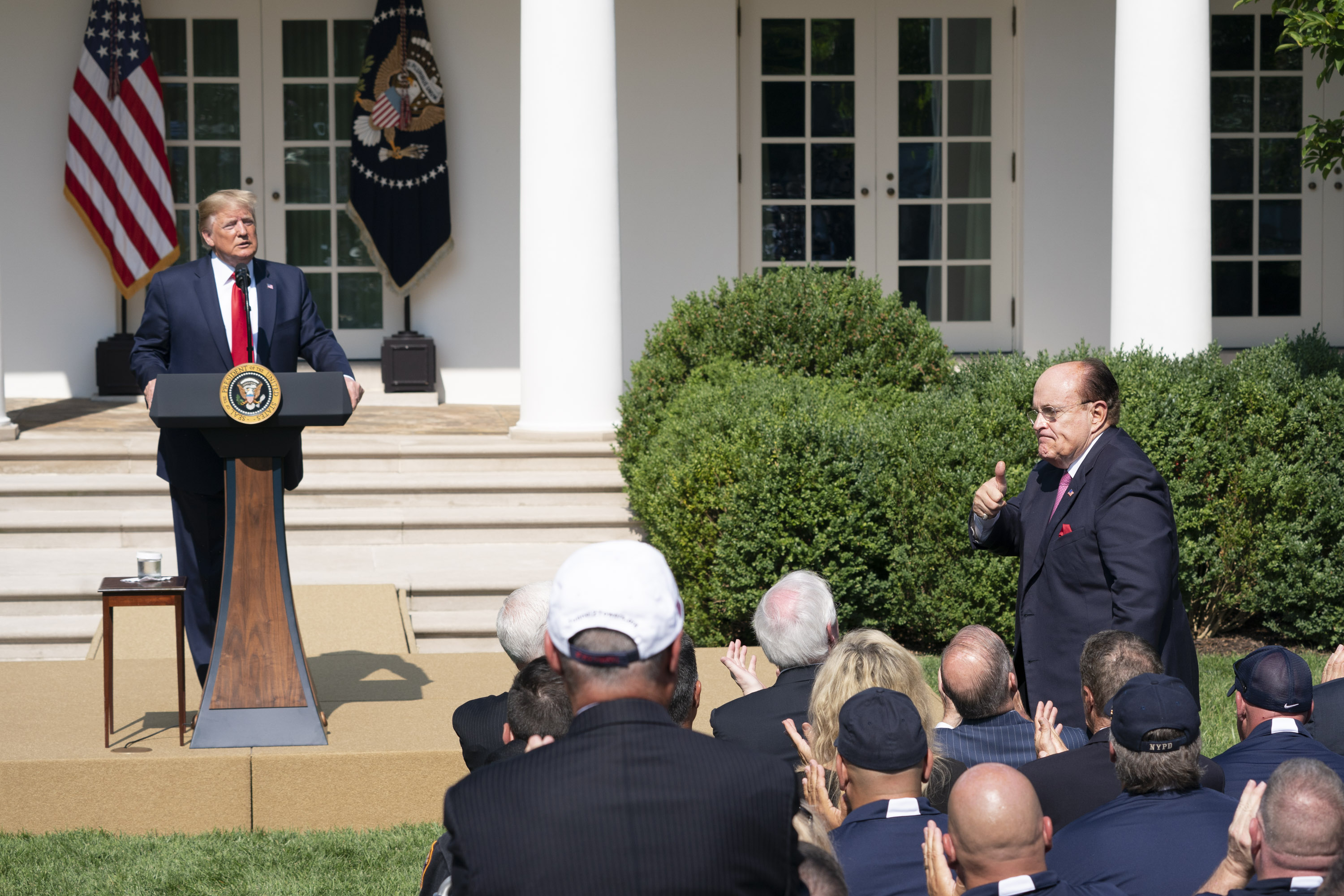
President Donald Trump recognizes Giuliani prior to signing H.R. 1327, an act to permanently authorize the September 11 Victim Compensation Fund, on July 29, 2019.

The then president-elect Trump named Giuliani his informal cybersecurity adviser on January 12, 2017. The status of this informal role for Giuliani was unclear because Trump created in November 2018 the Cybersecurity and Infrastructure Security Agency (CISA), headed by Chris Krebs as director and Matthew Travis as deputy. In the weeks following his appointment, Giuliani was forced to consult an Apple Store Genius Bar when he "was locked out of his iPhone because he had forgotten the passcode and entered the wrong one at least 10 times", belying his putative expertise in the field.

In January 2017, Giuliani said he advised President Trump in matters relating to Executive Order 13769, which barred citizens of seven Muslim-majority countries from entering the United States for 90 days. The order also suspended the admission of all refugees for 120 days. Giuliani drew scrutiny over his ties to foreign nations, regarding not registering per the Foreign Agents Registration Act (FARA).

==== Personal lawyer ====
In mid April 2018, Giuliani joined Trump's legal team, which dealt with the special counsel investigation by Robert Mueller into Russian interference in the 2016 U.S. elections. Giuliani said his goal was to negotiate a swift end to the investigation. In early May, Giuliani made public that Trump had reimbursed his personal attorney Michael Cohen $130,000 that Cohen had paid to adult-film actress Stormy Daniels for her agreement not to talk about her alleged affair with Trump. Cohen had earlier insisted he used his own money to pay Daniels, and he implied that he had not been reimbursed. Trump had previously said he knew nothing about the matter. Within a week, Giuliani said some of his own statements regarding this matter were "more rumor than anything else".

Later in May 2018, Giuliani, who was asked on whether the promotion of the Spygate conspiracy theory is meant to discredit the special counsel investigation, said the investigators "are giving us the material to do it. Of course, we have to do it in defending the president ... it is for public opinion" on whether to "impeach or not impeach" Trump. In June 2018, Giuliani said that a sitting president cannot be indicted: "I don't know how you can indict while he's in office. No matter what it is. If President Trump shot [then-FBI director] James Comey, he'd be impeached the next day. Impeach him, and then you can do whatever you want to do to him."

In June 2018, Giuliani also said Trump should not testify to the special counsel investigation because "our recollection keeps changing". In early July, Giuliani characterized that Trump had previously asked Comey to "give him [then-national security adviser Michael Flynn] a break". In mid-August, Giuliani denied making this comment: "What I said was, that is what Comey is saying Trump said." On August 19 on Meet the Press, Giuliani argued that Trump should not testify to the special counsel investigation because Trump could be "trapped into perjury" just by telling "somebody's version of the truth. Not the truth." Giuliani's argument continued: "Truth isn't truth." Giuliani later clarified that he was "referring to the situation where two people make precisely contradictory statements".

In late July, Giuliani defended Trump by saying "collusion is not a crime" and that Trump had done nothing wrong because he "didn't hack" or "pay for the hacking". He later elaborated that his comments were a "very, very familiar lawyer's argument" to "attack the legitimacy of the special counsel investigation". He also described and denied several supposed allegations that have never been publicly raised, regarding two earlier meetings among Trump campaign officials to set up the June 9, 2016, Trump Tower meeting with Russian citizens. In late August, Giuliani said the June 9, 2016, Trump Tower "meeting was originally for the purpose of getting information about Hillary Clinton".

Also in late July, Giuliani attacked Trump's former personal lawyer Michael Cohen as an "incredible liar", two months after calling Cohen an "honest, honorable lawyer". In mid-August, Giuliani defended Trump by saying: "The president's an honest man." It was reported in early September that Giuliani said the White House could and likely would prevent the special counsel investigation from making public certain information in its final report which would be covered by executive privilege. Also according to Giuliani, Trump's personal legal team is already preparing a "counter-report" to refute the potential special counsel investigation's report. Giuliani privately urged Trump in 2017 to extradite Fethullah Gülen. In late 2019, Giuliani represented Venezuelan businessman Alejandro Betancourt López, meeting with the Justice Department to ask not to bring charges against him.

In an interview with Olivia Nuzzi in New York magazine, Giuliani, who is a Roman Catholic of Italian descent, said: "Don't tell me I'm anti-Semitic if I oppose George Soros ... I'm more of a Jew than Soros is." George Soros is a Hungarian-born Jew who survived the Holocaust. The Anti-Defamation League replied, "Mr. Giuliani should apologize and retract his comments immediately unless he seeks to dog whistle to hardcore anti-Semites and white supremacists who believe this garbage." In the last days of the (first) Trump administration, when White House aides were soliciting fees to lobby for presidential pardons, Giuliani said that while he'd heard that large fees were being offered, he did not work on clemency cases, saying "I have enough money. I'm not starving." As of February 16, 2021, Giuliani was reportedly not actively involved in any of Trump's pending legal cases.

By 2023, Giuliani had reportedly incurred seven-figure legal fees in cases related to Donald Trump and the attempts to overturn the 2020 presidential election. In April 2023, Giuliani and his lawyer Robert Costello met twice with Trump at Mar-a-Lago to ask him for money. In response, a Trump PAC paid $340,000 toward Giuliani's data storage bill. On February 7, 2024, when Giuliani appeared in court to discuss his bankruptcy case, he told a U.S. trustee attorney that he was owed about $2 million by the Trump campaign and the RNC. He said the Trump campaign "just paid the expenses. Not all, but most. They never paid the legal fees." He said he did not wish to hold Donald Trump personally responsible for this bill. On July 12, 2024, his bankruptcy case was dismissed, and he was not allowed to file for bankruptcy again for one year.

=== Attempts to get Ukraine to carry out investigations ===
Since at least May 2019, Giuliani urged Ukraine's president, Volodymyr Zelenskyy, to investigate oil company Burisma, whose board once included Joe Biden's son Hunter Biden, and check for irregularities in Ukraine's investigation of Paul Manafort. He said such investigations would benefit his client's defense, and that his efforts had Trump's support. Toward this end, Giuliani met with Ukrainian officials throughout 2019. In July 2019, BuzzFeed News reported that Soviet-born Americans, and Igor Fruman and Lev Parnas, were liaisons between Giuliani and Ukrainian government officials in this effort. Parnas and Fruman, prolific Republican donors, neither registered as foreign agents in the United States nor were approved by the State Department. Giuliani responded that the report was "a pathetic effort to cover up what are enormous allegations of criminality by the Biden family". By September 2019, there had been no evidence of wrongdoing by the Bidens.

In October 2019, Giuliani hired former Watergate prosecutor Jon Sale to represent him in the House Intelligence Committee's impeachment investigation. The committee issued a subpoena to Giuliani asking him to release documents related to the Ukraine scandal. The New York Times reported on October 11, 2019, that the U.S. Attorney for the Southern District of New York, was investigating him for violating lobbying laws related to his activities in Ukraine. Bloomberg News reported that the investigation could extend to bribery of foreign officials or conspiracy, and The Wall Street Journal reported Giuliani was being investigated for a possible profit motive in a Ukrainian gas venture. Giuliani denied having any interest in the venture. Federal prosecutors issued subpoenas to associates of Giuliani to investigate individuals, apparently including Giuliani, on potential charges, including money laundering, obstruction of justice, conspiracy to defraud the US, and mail/wire fraud.

Giuliani was paid $500,000 to consult for Parnas' company named "Fraud Guarantee". Trump supporter attorney Charles Gucciardo paid Giuliani on behalf of Fraud Guarantee in two $250,000 payments, in 2018. In May 2019, Giuliani described Ukraine's chief prosecutor Yuriy Lutsenko as a "much more honest guy" than his predecessor, Viktor Shokin. After Lutsenko was removed from office, he said in September 2019 that he found no evidence of wrongdoing by the Bidens, and had met Giuliani about ten times. Giuliani reversed his stance, saying that Shokin is the one people "should have spoken to", while Lutsenko acted "corruptly" and "is exactly the prosecutor that Joe Biden put in in order to tank the case".

In September 2019, as reports surfaced that a whistleblower was alleging high-level misconduct related to Ukraine, Giuliani went on CNN. When asked if he had tried to get Ukrainian officials to investigate Biden, he replied "No, actually I didn't", but thirty seconds later said, "Of course I did". In a tweet, he seemed to confirm reports Trump had withheld military assistance scheduled for Ukraine unless they carried out the investigation. He said, "The reality is that the president of the United States, whoever he is, has every right to tell the president of another country you better straighten out the corruption in your country if you want me to give you a lot of money. If you're so damn corrupt that you can't investigate allegations – our money is going to get squandered." Tom Bossert, a former Homeland Security Advisor in the Trump administration, described Giuliani's theory that Ukraine was involved in 2016 U.S. election interference as "debunked"; Giuliani responded that Bossert "doesn't know what the hell he's talking about".

On October 2, 2019, Steve Linick, the State Department's inspector general, delivered a packet of apparent disinformation regarding President Biden and former ambassador to Ukraine, Marie Yovanovitch, to Capitol Hill. Linick told congressional aides his office questioned Ulrich Brechbuhl, Mike Pompeo's advisor about the origins of the packet. Giuliani acknowledged he passed the packet to Pompeo. In a November 2019 interview, he confirmed he had "needed Yovanovitch out of the way" because she was going to make his investigations difficult. Giuliani added, "They (the State Department) told me they would investigate it." Giuliani persuaded Trump to remove Yovanovitch from office in spring 2019. By April 2021, the U.S. attorney's office in Manhattan was investigating the role of Giuliani in Yovanovitch's removal.

U.S. ambassador to the European Union Gordon Sondland testified that Trump delegated policy on Ukraine to Giuliani. The late 2019 impeachment inquiry into Donald Trump centered around Giuliani's actions involving Ukraine. In testimony and reports of the House Intelligence Committee, Giuliani's name was mentioned more than any but Trump's. Experts suggested Giuliani may have violated the Logan Act. On November 22, 2019, Giuliani sent a letter to Senator Lindsey Graham, chairman of the Committee on the Judiciary, informing him of three witnesses from Ukraine who Giuliani said had direct evidence of Democratic criminal conspiracy with Ukrainians to prevent Trump's election and, after his election, to remove him via contrived charges. Giuliani claimed the witnesses had evidence of the Biden family's involvement in bribery, money laundering and Hobbs Act extortion. The letter sought Graham's help obtaining visas for the witnesses to testify. Graham invited Giuliani to share his findings with the Judiciary Committee, and advised him "to share what he got from Ukraine with the [intelligence community] to make sure it's not Russia propaganda".

Dmytro Firtash is a Ukrainian oligarch prominent in natural gas. In 2017, the Justice Department characterized him as in the "upper echelon of Russian organized crime". Since his 2014 arrest in Vienna, at the request of American authorities, he has been living there on $155 million bail fighting extradition to the US on bribery and racketeering charges. Firtash's attorneys obtained a September 2019 statement from Viktor Shokin, the former Ukrainian prosecutor who was forced out under pressure from multiple countries and non-governmental organizations, as conveyed to Ukraine by Joe Biden. Shokin falsely asserted that Biden had him fired because he refused to stop his investigation into Burisma. Giuliani, who asserts he has "nothing to do with" and has "never met or talked to" Firtash, promoted the statement in television appearances as purported evidence of wrongdoing by the Bidens. Giuliani told CNN he met with a Firtash attorney at the time he was seeking information about the Bidens. Firtash was represented by Trump and Giuliani associates Joseph diGenova and his wife Victoria Toensing, having hired them on Parnas' recommendation in July 2019.

The New York Times reported that Giuliani had directed Parnas to approach Firtash with the recommendation, with the proposition that Firtash could help provide damaging information on Biden, which Parnas' attorney described was "part of any potential resolution to [Firtash's] extradition matter". Shokin's statement notes that it was prepared "at the request of lawyers acting for Dmitry Firtash ('DF'), for use in legal proceedings in Austria". Bloomberg News reported that during summer 2019 Firtash associates began attempting to dig up dirt on the Bidens to solicit Giuliani's assistance with Firtash's legal matters; it also reported that Giuliani's publicizing of the Shokin statement had reduced the chances of the Justice Department dropping the charges against Firtash, as it would appear to be a political quid pro quo. The Washington Post reported on October 22 that after they began representing Firtash, Toensing and diGenova secured a rare face-to-face meeting with U.S. Attorney General Bill Barr to argue the Firtash charges should be dropped, but he declined to intervene.

On October 18, The New York Times reported that weeks earlier, before his associates Parnas and Fruman were indicted, Giuliani met with officials with the criminal and fraud divisions of the Justice Department regarding what Giuliani characterized as a "very sensitive" foreign bribery case involving a client of his. The Times did not name whom the case involved, but after publication of the story Giuliani told a reporter it was not Firtash. The Justice Department said its officials would not have met with Giuliani had they known his associates were under investigation by the U.S. Attorney for the Southern District of New York.

On December 3, 2019, the House Intelligence Committee's report included phone records, including calls made by Giuliani between April and August 2019. Calls involved Giuliani in contact with Kurt Volker, Republican representative and House Intelligence Committee ranking member Devin Nunes, Parnas, the White House switchboard, and an unidentified White House official whose phone number is referenced as "-1". Chairman Adam Schiff of the committee announced after the report's release that the committee was investigating whether "-1" referred to President Trump, citing grand jury evidence from the trial of Trump-associate Roger Stone in which phone number "-1" referred to Trump. Analyst Philip Bump reasoned that Giuliani's calls with "-1" are 'likely' calls with Trump citing that Giuliani spoke longer with "-1" than anyone else, "-1" always calls Giuliani, and generally after Giuliani calls the White House switchboard, and timing of Trump actions after Giuliani's calls with "-1" ended.

In December 2019, while the House Judiciary Committee began hearings for the impeachment inquiry, Giuliani returned to Ukraine to interview former officials for a documentary seeking to discredit impeachment proceedings. U.S. officials told The Washington Post that Giuliani would have been a target of Russian intelligence efforts during Trump's presidency, and particularly after Giuliani turned his focus to Ukraine – a former Soviet republic under attack from Russia and with deep penetration by Russian intelligence. Analysts say Trump and Giuliani's habit of communicating over unencrypted lines makes it likely foreign agencies would be listening, and agencies often collect intelligence through monitoring communications of people who interact with their target.

NBC News reported in December 2020 that SDNY investigators, had discussed with Justice Department officials the possibility of acquiring Giuliani's emails, which might require headquarters approval due to protection by attorney–client privilege. The New York Times reported in 2021 that the SDNY had requested a search warrant of Giuliani's electronic records in summer 2020, but were met with resistance from political appointees in the Washington headquarters, ostensibly because the election was near, while career officials were supportive. The Justice Department generally avoids taking significant actions relating to political figures that might become public within sixty days of an election. Political appointees nevertheless opposed the effort after the election, noting Giuliani played a leading role in challenging the election results. The officials deferred the matter to the incoming Biden administration.

Federal investigators in Manhattan executed search warrants on April 28, 2021, at Giuliani's office and Upper East Side apartment, seizing his electronic devices. In April 2021, Giuliani's attorney said investigators told him they had searched his client's iCloud account beginning in late 2019, later arguing to a judge that the search was illegal and so the raid on Giuliani's properties was "fruit of this poisoned tree", demanding to review documents justifying the iCloud search. In May 2021, the SDNY confirmed that in late 2019 it obtained search warrants for Giuliani's iCloud account, as part of "an ongoing, multi-year grand jury investigation into conduct involving Giuliani, Toensing, and others", and argued that attorneys for Giuliani were not entitled to review the underlying documents of the warrants prior to any charges. Giuliani and Toensing asserted their attorney-client privilege may have been violated by the iCloud searches, which investigators disputed, saying they employed a "filter team" to prevent them from seeing information protected by privilege. Federal judge J. Paul Oetken ruled in favor of investigators and granted their request for a special master to ensure attorney-client privilege was maintained. The special master released more than 3,000 of Giuliani's communications to prosecutors in 2022, agreeing to withhold forty for which Giuliani had asserted "privilege and/or highly personal" status and rejecting 37 such assertions.

The New York Times reported in 2021 that the SDNY was scrutinizing Giuliani's association with Firtash in efforts to discredit the Bidens, and efforts to lobby the Trump administration on behalf of Ukrainian officials and oligarchs. Time reported it had spoken with three unidentified witnesses who said they were questioned by investigators, two of whom said they had worked with Giuliani while cooperating with investigators; one said investigators were particularly interested in Giuliani's association with Firtash.

U.S. intelligence community analysis released in 2021 found Ukrainian politician Andrii Derkach was among proxies of Russian intelligence who promoted and laundered misleading or unsubstantiated narratives about Biden "to US media organizations, US officials, and prominent US individuals, including some close to former President Trump and his administration". Giuliani met with Derkach in December 2019. The New York Times confirmed in May 2021 that Derkach was the subject of a criminal investigation into foreign interference in the 2020 election, and further reported that "Federal prosecutors in Brooklyn have been investigating whether several Ukrainian officials helped orchestrate a wide-ranging plan to meddle in the 2020 presidential campaign, including using Rudolph W. Giuliani to spread their misleading claims about President Biden and tilt the election in Donald J. Trump's favor." On June 8, 2021, CNN uncovered audio of a 2019 call, stating that "Giuliani relentlessly pressured and coaxed the Ukrainian government to investigate baseless conspiracies about then-candidate Joe Biden." In November 2022, SDNY stated they would not indict Giuliani for his activities in Ukraine.

=== 2020 election lawsuits ===
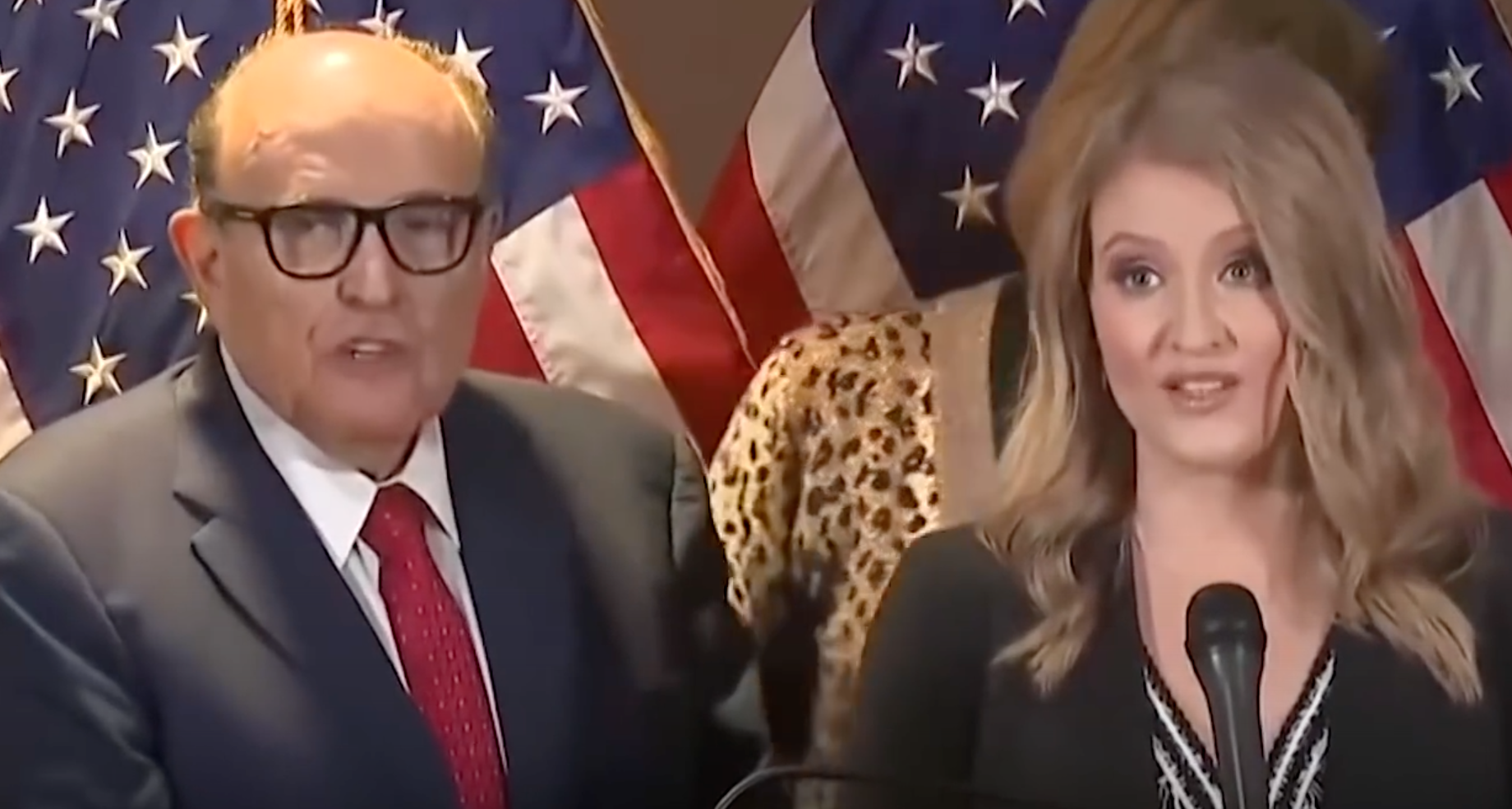
Giuliani with Jenna Ellis in November 2020

In November 2020, Trump placed Giuliani in charge of lawsuits related to alleged voter irregularities in the 2020 U.S. presidential election. On November 7, Giuliani gave a press conference at Four Seasons Total Landscaping in Philadelphia to discuss challenging the vote count in Pennsylvania, during which media networks called the presidential election for Biden. Trump designated Giuliani to lead a legal team to challenge the election results, telling Giuliani to "go wild" and "do anything you want" in his efforts to overturn them. This team, a self-described "elite strike force" that included Sidney Powell, Joseph diGenova, Victoria Toensing, and Trump campaign attorney Jenna Ellis, appeared at a November 19 press conference in which they made numerous false and unsubstantiated assertions revolving around an international Communist conspiracy, rigged voting machines, and polling place fraud.

Giuliani repeatedly publicly denounced the use of provisional ballots (in which the poll worker does not see the voter's name on the rolls, so the voter swears an affidavit oath that they are registered to vote), arguing that the practice enables fraud, although Giuliani himself had cast this type of ballot on October 31, 2020, in Manhattan. By January 8, 2021, Trump and his team had lost 63 lawsuits. Giuliani's associate Maria Ryan sent a letter to White House chief of staff Mark Meadows requesting that Giuliani be paid $2.5 million and receive a "general pardon". A month later, when Trump was out of office, Giuliani was no longer representing him in any pending cases, according to a Trump adviser. While Trump continued to fundraise, purportedly for his election-related legal fights, as of the end of July 2021 he had not given any of this money to Giuliani. In October 2021, in another context, Trump remarked: "I do pay my lawyers when they do a good job."

==== Pennsylvania lawsuit ====
One early lawsuit sought to invalidate up to 700,000 mail-in ballots and stop Pennsylvania from certifying its election results. Giuliani said he had signed affidavits attesting to voter fraud and election official misconduct in Pennsylvania and elsewhere. Despite not having argued a case in any courtroom for over three decades, Giuliani applied for special permission to represent the Trump presidential campaign in the federal court of Pennsylvania. In doing so, Giuliani misrepresented his status with the District of Columbia Bar in his application by stating that he was a member of the bar in good standing, when in fact the District of Columbia had suspended him for nonpayment of fees. In his first day in court on the case, which was November 17, 2020, Giuliani struggled with rudimentary legal processes and was accused by lawyers for the Pennsylvania secretary of state of making legal arguments that were "disgraceful in an American courtroom". Judge Matthew Brann questioned how Giuliani could justify "asking this court to invalidate some 6.8 million votes thereby disenfranchising every single voter in the commonwealth."

His federal lawsuit against Pennsylvania was dismissed with prejudice on November 21, 2020, with the judge citing "strained legal arguments without merit and speculative accusations", which were "unsupported by evidence". Giuliani and Jenna Ellis reacted by stating that the ruling "helps" the Trump campaign "get expeditiously to the U.S. Supreme Court". They also claimed that the judge, Matthew W. Brann, was "Obama-appointed", when he is a Republican and former member of the right-leaning Federalist Society.

The Trump campaign appealed the lawsuit to the Third Circuit Court of Appeals, where a three-judge panel on November 27 rejected the Trump campaign's attempt to undo Pennsylvania's vote certification, because the Trump campaign's "claims have no merit". The panel also ruled that the District Court was correct in preventing the Trump campaign from conducting a second amendment of its complaint. An amendment would be pointless, ruled the judges, because the Trump campaign was not bringing facts before the court, and not even alleging fraud. Judge Stephanos Bibas highlighted that Giuliani himself told the district court that the Trump campaign "doesn't plead fraud", and that this "is not a fraud case". The panel concluded that neither "specific allegations" nor "proof" was provided in this case, and that the Trump campaign "cannot win this lawsuit". Giuliani and Ellis reacted to the appeals court ruling by condemning the "activist judicial machinery in Pennsylvania". Of the three Appeal Court judges, Stephanos Bibas, who delivered the opinion, was appointed by Trump himself, while judges D. Brooks Smith and Michael Chagares were appointed by Republican president George W. Bush.

==== Dominion and Smartmatic lawsuits ====
As part of his allegations that voting machines had been rigged, Giuliani made several false assertions about two rival companies, Dominion Voting Systems and Smartmatic. These false claims included that Smartmatic owned Dominion; that Dominion voting machines used Smartmatic software; that Dominion voting machines sent vote data to Smartmatic at foreign locations; that Dominion was founded by the former socialist Venezuelan leader Hugo Chávez; and that Dominion is a "radical-left" company with connections to antifa. Both companies sued Giuliani and Fox News. Dominion filed a defamation lawsuit against Giuliani in January 2021, seeking $1.3 billion in damages; the parties settled on September 26, 2025, for an undisclosed sum. Separately, Dominion sued Fox News for $1.6 billion, and settled for $787.5 million. Dominion also sued Sidney Powell for election-related lies.

On February 4, 2021, Smartmatic sued Giuliani, Fox News and some of its hosts, and Powell, accusing them of engaging in a "disinformation campaign" against the company; the company sought $2.7 billion in damages. A New York State Supreme Court judge, in March 2022, denied the defendants' motion to dismiss, ruling that the Smartmatic's defamation suit against Fox News and Giuliani could proceed; however, the court dismissed two of the sixteen counts against Giuliani. In February 2023, the Appellate Division reinstated the two counts. On September 10, 2021, Fox News told Giuliani that neither he nor his son Andrew would be allowed on their network for nearly three months.

==== Judgment for defaming Georgia election workers ====
In 2021, Georgia election workers Ruby Freeman and daughter Wandrea' ArShaye Moss, sued Giuliani in U.S. District Court for the District of Columbia for defamation, after Giuliani falsely accused them of manipulating vote tallies. He accused them of "passing around USB ports as if they were vials of heroin or cocaine" and engaging in "surreptitious illegal activity", citing footage that according to Moss showed them with "a ginger mint". Moss testified before the U.S. House of Representatives that after Giuliani's remarks her family were subjected to racist threats.

In 2023, Giuliani was ordered to pay attorneys' fees to the election workers after being sanctioned for failing to turn over evidence. Giuliani admitted his statements had been "defamatory per se" yet denied they had caused damages. The judge asked him to explain why he was still fighting the lawsuit, given his admission. District judge Beryl Howell issued an order ruling that he forfeited his case by failing to comply with his discovery obligations. Meanwhile, the court increased what he owed for the plaintiffs' legal fees. The plaintiffs requested money to cover additional attorneys' fees that arose from discovery disputes. The judge increased what Giuliani owed; the total was $230,000.

In October, the judge said that due to Giuliani's "continued and flagrant disregard of this Court's...order that he produce financial-related documents concerning his...assets", she would tell jurors he intentionally hid financial documents. The trial began on December 11, the plaintiffs' testified that Giuliani's false statements, beginning with a tweet, prompted threatening phone calls and messages against them. They testified that Giuliani's lies caused others to show up at Freeman's home, to attempt to conduct a "citizen's arrest" of Moss, and barrage Moss' son with phone messages. Giuliani repeated his false claim that Freeman and Moss "were engaged in changing votes" and claimed that "When I testify, the whole story will be definitively clear that what I said was true." Giuliani declined to testify. Giuliani's attorney pointed to another defamation lawsuit Freeman and Moss had filed against The Gateway Pundit, saying the site had likely instigated the harassment against them.

On December 15, the jury ordered Giuliani to pay $148 million to Freeman and Moss, including $75 million in punitive damages. Giuliani said he regretted nothing and would appeal. On December 20, concerned given the "ample record ... of Giuliani's efforts to conceal ... assets", Judge Beryl Howell ordered swift payment of damages. On December 21, Giuliani filed for bankruptcy. Earlier on December 18, Freeman and Moss sued Giuliani again, seeking an injunction to permanently prohibit him from defaming them. They agreed to drop this in exchange for Giuliani's promise never again to state, imply, or assist others' remarks that they "engaged in wrongdoing in connection with the 2020 presidential election".

In January 2024, Freeman and Moss accused Giuliani of taking unfair advantage of the bankruptcy system in a court filing, with their attorneys calling Giuliani's approach "a flawed, impermissible litigation tactic from an actor with a history of engaging the judicial system in bad faith." In March, creditors filed a motion to force him to sell his Florida condo to pay the judgment. On July 12, the judge, citing Giuliani's lack of transparency over the six months of litigation, said he was no longer entitled to bankruptcy protection. On October 22, a federal judge in Manhattan ordered Giuliani to turn over his $6 million Manhattan penthouse apartment and other valuable possessions to Freeman and Moss. Giuliani's net worth, including his Manhattan apartment and Florida oceanside condo, was estimated at $10 million compared to the jury's $148 million defamation judgment. On October 31, Freeman and Moss visited Giuliani's apartment. They discovered it had been emptied of "the vast majority ... of the valuable receivership property that was known to be stored there", a fact that "neither Defendant nor Defendant's counsel had bothered to mention". Giuliani's lawyers told them unspecified property was in a storage facility on Long Island and his vintage Mercedes was in Florida. Giuliani's lawyers provided bank statements showing a large amount of money had been transferred out of his account in July and August and that less than $4,000 remained in the account.

At a hearing on November 7, Giuliani's lawyer proposed the Mercedes might be worth under $4,000, meaning Giuliani would be allowed to keep it. Giuliani claimed he had no idea of the whereabouts of his other valuables. The judge gave Giuliani until November 15 to turn over his property. Two days before that deadline, lawyers told the judge they did not want to represent Giuliani anymore. Joseph Cammarata took on Giuliani's case and told the court on November 15 that he had turned over the Mercedes, 18 watches, a diamond ring, and had begun a process to turn over $30,000 in cash. A week later, the cash had still not arrived, and Freeman and Moss still did not have the keys to his apartment. On November 22, Freeman and Moss told U.S. district judge Lewis Liman there had been attempts to "intimidate or interfere" with their access to the storage unit and it was taking the form of a social media campaign against them. Giuliani was ruled in contempt by Liman at a hearing on January 3, 2025. On January 10, Howell found him in contempt for refusing to turn over financial records. On January 16, the day of a trial before Liman to enforce payment, the parties settled after "long negotiations that went into the wee hours of the night." Giuliani kept his homes in exchange for compensating Freeman and Moss with an undisclosed amount and agreeing to refrain from defaming them again.

=== Attack on the Capitol ===
On January 6, 2021, Giuliani spoke at the "Save America March" rally on the Ellipse that was attended by Trump supporters protesting the election results. He repeated conspiracy theories that voting machines used in the election were "crooked" and called for "trial by combat", which he claimed after the riot had not been a call to violence but a reference to Game of Thrones. Trump supporters subsequently stormed the U.S. Capitol in a riot that resulted in the deaths of four people, and temporarily disrupted the counting of the Electoral College vote.

Giuliani had reportedly called Republican lawmakers to urge them to delay the electoral vote count with the intention of throwing the election to Trump. Giuliani attempted to contact Alabama senator Tommy Tuberville, a Trump ally, around 7 p.m. following the Capitol storming, planning to ask him to "try to just slow it down" by objecting to multiple states and "raise issues so that we get ourselves into tomorrow – ideally until the end of tomorrow". Giuliani mistakenly left the message on the voicemail of another senator, who leaked the recording to The Dispatch. Rick Perlstein, a noted historian of the American conservative movement, termed Giuliani's effort as treasonous and days later tweeted: "Sedition. Open and shut. He talked about the time that was being opened up. He was welcoming, and using, the violence. This needs to be investigated."

Giuliani faced criticism for his appearance at the rally and the Capitol riot that followed it. Former congressman and MSNBC host Joe Scarborough called for the arrest of Giuliani, President Trump, and Donald Trump Jr. Manhattan College president Brennan O'Donnell stated in a January 7 open letter to the college community, "one of the loudest voices fueling the anger, hatred, and violence that spilled out yesterday is a graduate of our College, Rudolph Giuliani. His conduct as a leader of the campaign to de-legitimize the election and disenfranchise millions of voters – has been and continues to be a repudiation of the deepest values of his alma mater."

On January 11, the New York State Bar Association, an advocacy group for the legal profession in New York state, announced that it was launching an investigation into whether Giuliani should be removed from its membership rolls, noting both Giuliani's comments to the Trump supporter rally at the Ellipse on January 6, and that it "has received hundreds of complaints in recent months about Mr. Giuliani and his baseless efforts on behalf of President Trump to cast doubt on the veracity of the 2020 presidential election and, after the votes were cast, to overturn its legitimate results". Removal from the group's membership rolls would not directly disbar Giuliani from practicing law in New York. New York state senator Brad Hoylman and lawyers' group Lawyers Defending American Democracy, also filed a complaints against Giuliani with the Attorney Grievance Committee of the First Judicial Department of the New York Supreme Court, which has the authority to discipline and disbar licensed New York lawyers.

Also on January 11, District of Columbia attorney general Karl Racine said that he is looking at whether to charge Giuliani, along with Trump Jr. and Representative Mo Brooks, with inciting the violent attack. On January 29, Giuliani said falsely that the Lincoln Project played a role in the organization of the Capitol riot. In response, Steve Schmidt threatened to sue Giuliani for defamation. On March 5, Representative Eric Swalwell filed a civil lawsuit against Giuliani and three others (Trump, Trump Jr., and Brooks), seeking damages for their alleged role in inciting the Capitol riot. Responding to a January 2022 subpoena from the U.S. House Select Committee on the January 6 Attack, Giuliani testified on May 20, 2022.

== After first Trump presidency ==
=== Indictments ===
Giuliani's booking photograph released by the Fulton County, Georgia, sheriff's office

On August 1, 2023, the Justice Department's special counsel investigating Trump's efforts to overturn the 2020 election charged Trump with four criminal counts related to those efforts. News reports widely identified Giuliani as the unnamed "Co-Conspirator 1" (of six) mentioned at least 46 times in the 45-page indictment. In a statement, Giuliani's lawyer, Robert J. Costello, acknowledged that it "appears that Mayor Giuliani is alleged to be co-conspirator No. 1."

On August 14, 2023, Giuliani was indicted, along with Trump and 17 others, by an Atlanta, Georgia, grand jury. The 41-count indictment charged the group of 19 under state racketeering laws for conspiring to "change the outcome of the election in favor of Trump". Giuliani's false testimony in December 2020 to Georgia lawmakers about election fraud was among the events listed in the indictment. His lawyer (at least for the arraignment) was Brian Tevis. Giuliani turned himself in at the Fulton County Sheriff's Office on August 23. On September 9, he filed to have the charges against him quashed.

In April 2024, Giuliani was among 18 people who were indicted on charges related to the 2020 election in Arizona. By mid-May, Giuliani was the only defendant yet to be served with a summons to court for this case, with prosecutors stating that they had mailed Giuliani the documents with no response, called Giuliani's telephone with no response, and visited his apartment building but were "not granted access", to which Giuliani responded: "Arizona officials say they can't find Giuliani. So this is perfect evidence that if they're so incompetent, they can't find me, they also can't count votes correctly."

On May 17, during his early 80th birthday celebration, Giuliani posted on social media a photo of himself smiling in a group of people along with balloons, with Giuliani writing, "If Arizona authorities can't find me by tomorrow morning; 1. They must dismiss the indictment", and around one hour later, Arizona's attorney general Kris Mayes announced that Giuliani had been successfully served, while Giuliani's spokesperson responded by criticizing the "decision to try and embarrass [Giuliani] during his 80th birthday party".

On May 21, Giuliani and ten other co-defendants pled not guilty after being arraigned in Maricopa County Superior Court. Giuliani was among five of these eleven defendants who appeared virtually rather than in-person. The same day, Giuliani was ordered to post a $10,000 bond and was required to book himself into the custody of the Maricopa County Sheriff's Office within 30 days as a result of him ducking efforts by the state to serve him with a summons within the past week; in contrast to Giuliani, all of the other ten defendants would be released without bond. In August 2024, an Arizona judge set the trial date for Giuliani and others for January 5, 2026.

=== Suspension of law license and New York disbarment ===
On June 24, 2021, a New York Appellate Court suspended Giuliani's law license. The panel of five justices found that there was "uncontroverted" evidence that Giuliani made "demonstrably false and misleading statements to courts, lawmakers and the public" and added, "These false statements were made to improperly bolster (Giuliani's) narrative that due to widespread voter fraud, victory in the 2020 United States presidential election was stolen from his client." The court concluded that Giuliani's conduct "immediately threatens the public interest and warrants interim suspension from the practice of law". His license was also suspended in Washington, D.C., on July 7, 2021. On July 2, 2024, a New York state appeals court disbarred Giuliani as a result of his efforts to subvert the 2020 election by making false allegations about mass voter fraud.

=== Ethics charges for baseless claims in favor of Trump ===
On June 10, 2022, the DC Bar's Office of Disciplinary Counsel filed charges with the DC Court of Appeals' Board on Professional Responsibility against Giuliani. The ethics charges said that Giuliani's federal court filings regarding the 2020 presidential election in Pennsylvania contained baseless claims in favor of Trump. On December 15, 2022, after a week-long hearing, the D.C. Bar Disciplinary Counsel recommended Giuliani be disbarred for violating rules of professional conduct by making false election fraud claims and trying to overturn the 2020 presidential election results in Pennsylvania. The counsel's decision is preliminary and non-binding. On July 7, 2023, an ad hoc hearing committee of the Board on Professional Responsibility recommended that he be disbarred, and on May 31, 2024, the board itself agreed. He was disbarred by the DC Court of Appeals on September 26, 2024.

=== Supermarket incident ===
On June 27, 2022, Giuliani appeared at ShopRite, a supermarket in Staten Island, campaigning on behalf of his son Andrew, who was attempting to become the Republican nominee for governor of New York. After Giuliani's appearance, a 39-year-old supermarket employee, Daniel Gill, was arrested and charged with second-degree assault for allegedly slapping Giuliani's back in the store. Giuliani responded publicly that it was like "a boulder hit me" or "like somebody shot me", and that "it hurt tremendously". Giuliani further stated that the "very, very heavy shot" by Gill caused him to stumble and "could've easily ... knocked me to the ground and killed me by my head getting hit", and called for Gill's firing and prosecution. The Legal Aid Society, representing Gill, asserted that Giuliani had exaggerated the severity of the slap to garner greater amounts of attention from the media, stating in a press release: "Our client merely patted Mr. Giuliani, who sustained nothing remotely resembling physical injuries, without malice to simply get his attention, as the video footage clearly showed."

Within a day of the incident, the New York Post posted video footage of it. The New York Times described that the video "contradicted" Giuliani's account, showing Gill walking quickly past Giuliani, "patting him on the back", whereby Giuliani "wobbled slightly forward". The Hill described that the "video shows Giuliani barely moving after a ShopRite employee's hand makes contact with his back", while Giuliani responded that the "videotape that you see is probably a little deceptive", stressing that he was "hit very, very hard on the back. To such an extent that it knocked me back about two steps."

After the video was released, Gill's charge was reduced to third-degree assault on June 28, while third-degree menacing and second-degree harassment charges were simultaneously added. Gill acknowledged telling Giuliani "What's up, scumbag?" during the incident. In September 2022, Gill agreed to an adjournment in contemplation of dismissal, whereby all charges would be dismissed if he does not violate the law in the next six months. In May 2023, Gill sued Giuliani, seeking monetary damages "for false arrest, civil rights conspiracy resulting in false arrest and false imprisonment, defamation, intentional infliction of emotional distress, and negligent infliction of emotional distress". The case was dismissed in 2024.

=== Sexual assault and misconduct allegations ===
On May 15, 2023, Noelle Dunphy, a former off-the-books employee of Giuliani, filed a civil lawsuit against him. She accused Giuliani of sexual assault, wage theft and unlawful abuse of power. Dunphy claimed that sexually satisfying Giuliani was an "absolute requirement" of her job; the complaint also said that Giuliani "often made outrageous comments that created and added to the hostile work environment that Ms. Dunphy was forced to endure", and that he was constantly under the effects of alcohol. The lawsuit further alleged that Giuliani complained about "'freakin Arabs' and Jews", and implied that "[Jewish men's] penises were inferior due to 'natural selection'". The lawsuit also alleged that Giuliani and Donald Trump sold pardons for $2 million apiece. In her 2023 memoir Enough, Cassidy Hutchinson says that Giuliani groped her backstage during Donald Trump's speech on January 6, 2021.

=== Other legal issues ===
In September 2023, law firm Davidoff Hutcher & Citron sued Giuliani for over $1.3 million in unpaid legal fees. The firm alleged that Giuliani had paid only $214,000 of his total legal bill between November 2019 and July 2023. Giuliani said that the firm's bill "is way in excess to anything approaching legitimate fees." Also in September 2023, Hunter Biden filed a civil lawsuit against Giuliani, his companies and attorney Robert Costello, alleging that they had spent years "hacking into, tampering with, manipulating, copying, disseminating, and generally obsessing over data that they were given that was taken or stolen from" his personal devices and caused "total annihilation" of his digital privacy. Biden dropped the lawsuit in June 2024.

In October 2023, Giuliani filed a defamation lawsuit in New Hampshire against President Joe Biden for referring to him as a "Russian pawn" during a 2020 presidential debate. Giuliani alleged that Biden's comments were false and that he had been personally harmed by them. Giuliani did not respond to a motion to dismiss the lawsuit in March 2024. The lawsuit was dismissed in September, with the judge saying that Giuliani had "utterly failed" to carry his burden.

== Other post-mayoral ventures ==
=== Giuliani Partners ===
After leaving the New York City mayor's office, Giuliani founded a security consulting business, Giuliani Partners LLC, in 2002, a firm that has been categorized by multiple media outlets as a lobbying entity capitalizing on Giuliani's name recognition, and which has been the subject of allegations surrounding staff hired by Giuliani and due to the firm's chosen client base. Over five years, Giuliani Partners earned more than $100 million.

In June 2007, he stepped down as CEO and chairman of Giuliani Partners, although this action was not made public until December 4, 2007; he maintained his equity interest in the firm. Giuliani subsequently returned to active participation in the firm following the election. In late 2009, Giuliani announced that they had a security consulting contract with Rio de Janeiro, Brazil regarding the 2016 Summer Olympics. He faced criticism in 2012 for advising people once allied with Slobodan Milošević who had lauded Serbian war criminals.

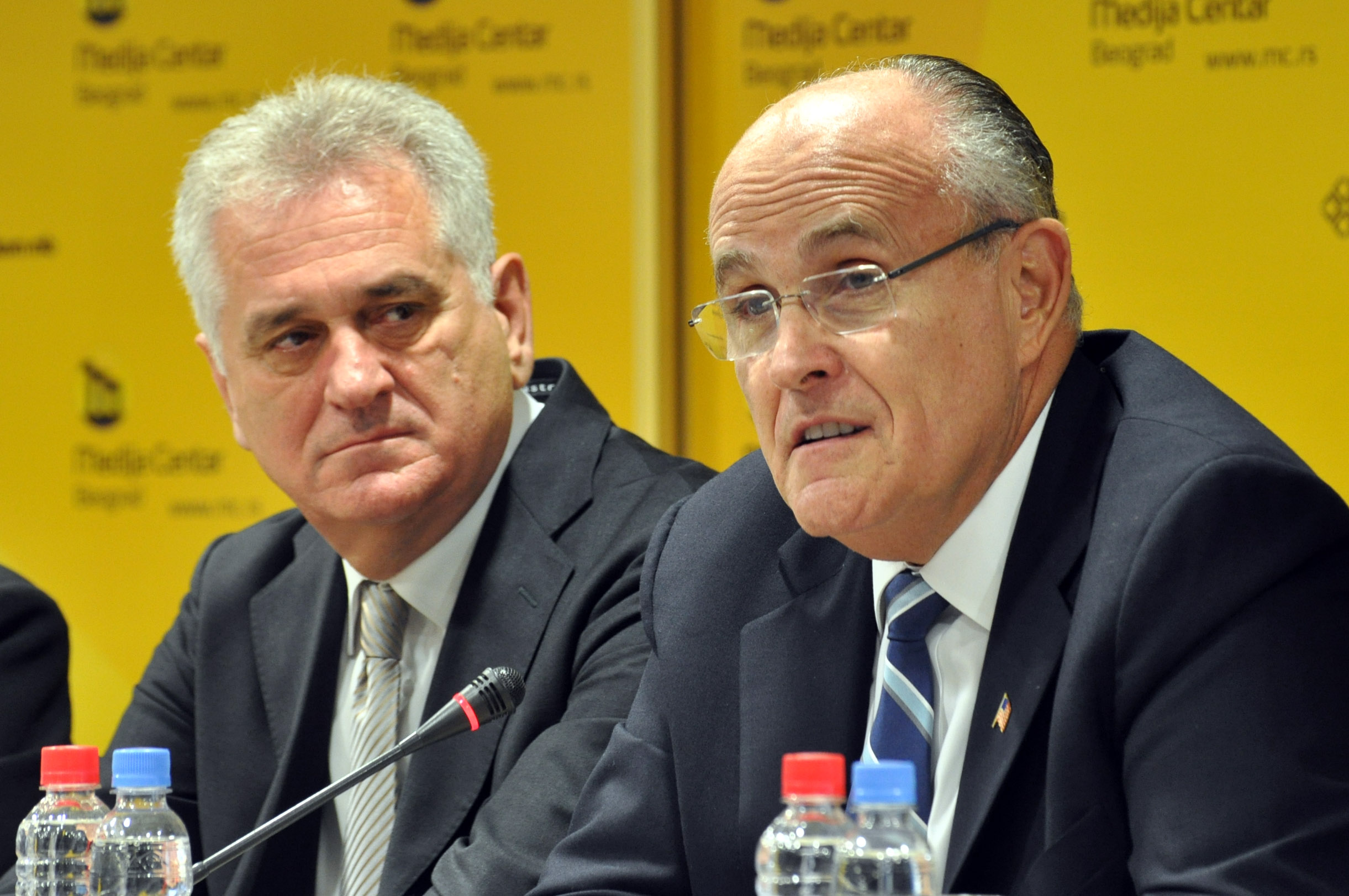
Serbian president Tomislav Nikolić and Giuliani at a joint press conference, 2012

=== Bracewell and Giuliani ===
In 2005, Giuliani joined the law firm of Bracewell & Patterson LLP (renamed Bracewell & Giuliani LLP) as a name partner and basis for the expanding firm's new New York office. When he joined the Texas-based firm he brought Marc Mukasey, the son of Attorney General Michael Mukasey, into the firm. Despite a busy schedule, Giuliani was highly active in the day-to-day business of the law firm, which was a high-profile supplier of legal and lobbying services to the oil, gas, and energy industries. Its aggressive defense of pollution-causing coal-fired power plants threatened to cause political risk for Giuliani, but association with the firm helped Giuliani achieve fund-raising success in Texas.

In 2006, Giuliani acted as the lead counsel and lead spokesmen for Bracewell & Giuliani client Purdue Pharma, the makers of OxyContin, during their negotiations with federal prosecutors over charges that the pharmaceutical company misled the public about OxyContin's addictive properties. The agreement reached resulted in Purdue Pharma and some of its executives paying $634.5 million in fines. Bracewell & Giuliani represented corporate clients before many U.S. government departments and agencies. Some clients have worked with corporations and foreign governments. The firm was rebranded as Bracewell LLP after Giuliani left it in January 2016, reportedly by "amicable agreement".

=== Greenberg Traurig ===
In January 2016, Giuliani moved to the law firm Greenberg Traurig, where he served as the global chairman for Greenberg's cybersecurity and crisis management group, as well as a senior advisor to the firm's executive chairman. He took an unpaid leave of absence in April 2018 when he joined Trump's legal defense team. He resigned from the firm on May 9, 2018.

=== Lobbying in Romania ===
In August 2018, Giuliani was retained by Freeh Group International Solutions, a global consulting firm run by former FBI director Louis Freeh, which paid him a fee to lobby Romanian president Klaus Iohannis to change Romania's anti-corruption policy and reduce the role of the National Anticorruption Directorate. Giuliani argued that the anti-corruption efforts had gone too far.

=== Podcast ===
Giuliani launched a podcast, Rudy Giuliani's Common Sense, in January 2020.

=== Television appearances ===
Giuliani was reportedly revealed to be the first unmasking on the seventh season of The Masked Singer, which caused judges Ken Jeong and Robin Thicke to leave the set in disgust. Giuliani actually turned out to be the ninth unmasking as "Jack in the Box" of Team Bad. He mentioned that he partook in this show to do it for his newborn granddaughter. It was during his unmasked performance of George Thorogood's "Bad to the Bone" when Jeong walked off.

In a September 2026 interview on Newsmax, Giuliani went on what The New York Times called an "anti-Muslim diatribe", including saying New York mayor Zohran Mamdani should not attend 25th anniversary memorials of the September 11 attacks and accusing him of being secretly against America.

== Personal life ==
=== Marriages and relationships ===
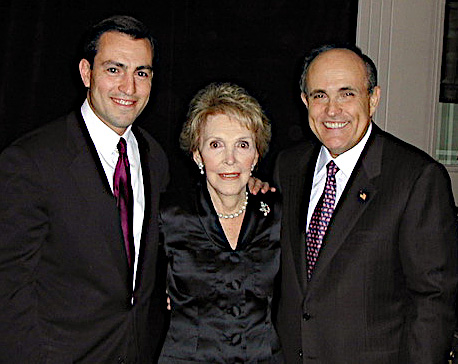
Giuliani with Congressman Vito Fossella and former first lady Nancy Reagan in 2002

Giuliani married Regina Peruggi, his second cousin, whom he had known since childhood, on October 26, 1968. The marriage was in trouble by the mid-1970s and they agreed to a trial separation in 1975. Peruggi did not accompany him to Washington when he accepted the job in the U.S. Attorney General's Office. Giuliani met local television personality Donna Hanover sometime in 1982, and they began dating when she was working in Miami. Giuliani filed for legal separation from Peruggi on August 12, 1982. The Giuliani–Peruggi marriage legally ended in two ways: a civil divorce was issued by the end of 1982, while a Roman Catholic church annulment of the marriage was granted at the end of 1983, reportedly because Giuliani had discovered that he and Peruggi were second cousins. Alan Placa, Giuliani's best man, later became a priest and helped secure the annulment. Giuliani and Peruggi had no children.

Giuliani married Hanover at St. Monica's church in Manhattan on April 15, 1984. They had two children: Andrew and Caroline Rose, who is a filmmaker in the LGBTQ+ community and has described herself as "multiverses apart" from her father. Giuliani was still married to Hanover in May 1999 when he met Judith Nathan, a sales manager for a pharmaceutical company, at Club Macanudo, an Upper East Side cigar bar. By 1996, Donna Hanover had reverted to her professional name and virtually stopped appearing in public with her husband amid rumors of marital problems. Nathan and Giuliani formed an ongoing relationship. In summer 1999, Giuliani charged the costs for his NYPD security detail to obscure city agencies to keep his relationship with Nathan from public scrutiny. The police department began providing Nathan with city-provided chauffeur services in early 2000.

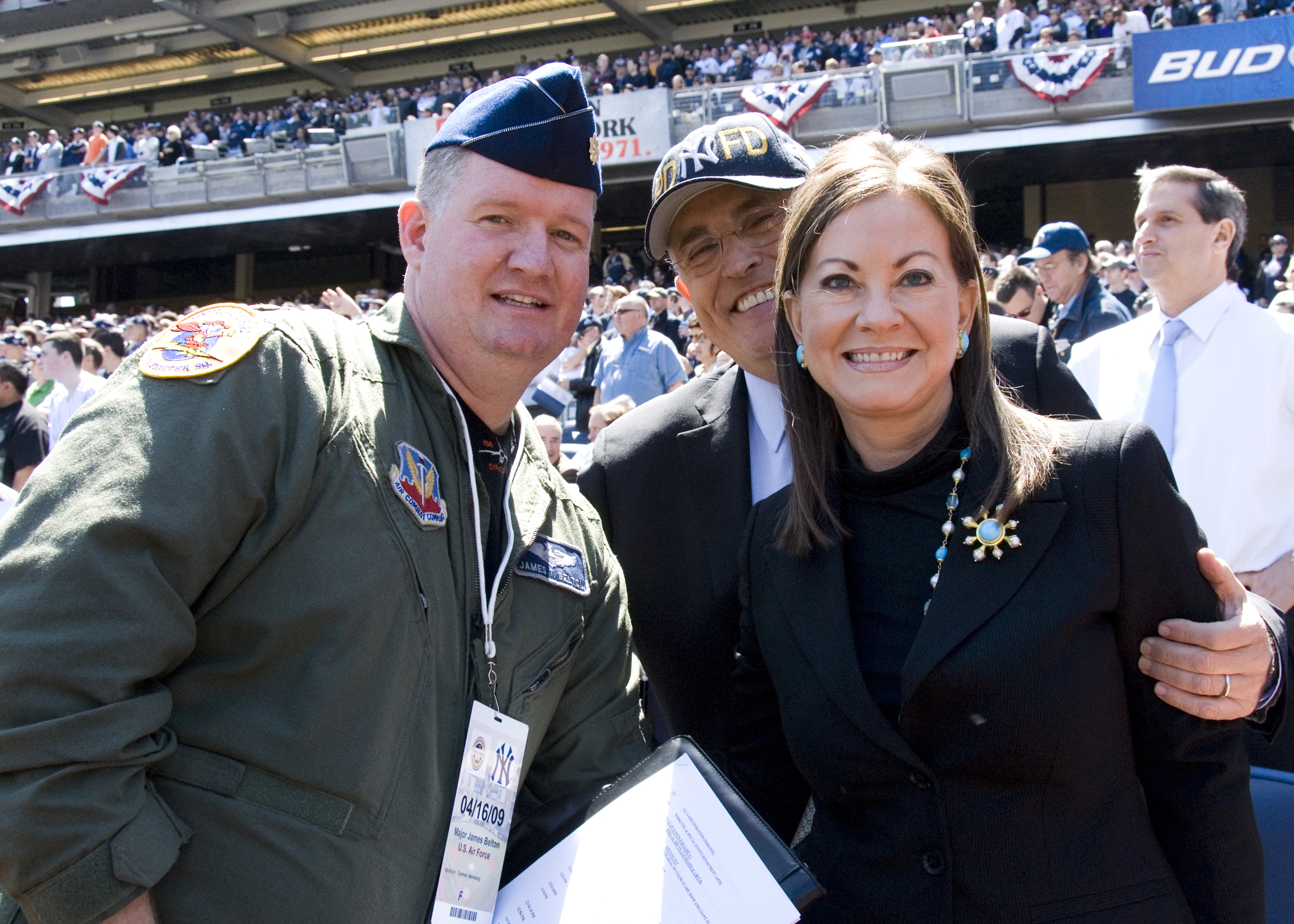
A New York Air National Guard major poses with Rudy and Judith Giuliani at Yankee Stadium in April 2009.

By March 2000, Giuliani had stopped wearing his wedding ring. The appearances that he and Nathan made at functions and events became publicly visible, although they were not mentioned in the press. The Daily News and the New York Post both broke news of Giuliani's relationship with Nathan in early May 2000. Giuliani first publicly acknowledged her on May 3, 2000, when he said Judith was his "very good friend".

On May 10, 2000, Giuliani held a press conference to announce that he intended to separate from Hanover. Giuliani had not informed Hanover about his plans before the press conference. This was an omission for which Giuliani was widely criticized. Giuliani then went on to praise Nathan as a "very, very fine woman" and said about Hanover that "over the course of some period of time in many ways, we've grown to live independent and separate lives." Hours later Hanover said, "I had hoped that we could keep this marriage together. For several years, it was difficult to participate in Rudy's public life because of his relationship with one staff member", in reference to another woman who worked on Giuliani's staff. Giuliani moved out of Gracie Mansion by August 2001 and into an apartment with a couple he was friends with. Giuliani filed for divorce from Hanover in October 2000, and a public battle broke out between their representatives. Nathan was barred by court order from entering Gracie Mansion or meeting his children before the divorce was final.

In May 2001, Giuliani's attorney revealed that Giuliani was impotent due to prostate cancer treatments and had not had sex with Nathan for the preceding year. Giuliani said, "You don't get through treatment for cancer and radiation all by yourself. You need people to help you and care for you and support you. And I'm very fortunate I had a lot of people who did that, but nobody did more to help me than Judith Nathan." In a court case, Giuliani argued that he planned to introduce Nathan to his children on Father's Day 2001 and that Hanover had prevented this visit. Giuliani and Hanover finally settled their divorce case in July 2002 after his mayoralty had ended, with Giuliani paying Hanover a $6.8 million settlement and granting her custody of their children. Giuliani married Nathan on May 24, 2003, and gained a stepdaughter, Whitney. It was also Nathan's third marriage after two divorces.

By March 2007, The New York Times and the Daily News reported that Giuliani had become estranged from both his son Andrew and his daughter Caroline. In September 2024, while endorsing Kamala Harris for the 2024 United States presidential election, Caroline wrote that her relationship with her father was "cartoonishly complicated", and added: "Despite his faults, I love him." Nathan filed for divorce from Giuliani on April 4, 2018, after 15 years of marriage. According to an interview with New York magazine, Nathan said that "For a variety of reasons that I know as a spouse and a nurse . . . he has become a different man." The divorce was settled on December 10, 2019.

=== Health ===
Giuliani's father died at age 73 of prostate cancer at Memorial Sloan–Kettering Cancer Center in April 1981. Nineteen years later, in April 2000, Giuliani, then aged 55, was diagnosed with prostate cancer following a prostate biopsy, after an elevated screening PSA. Giuliani would go on to make a full recovery, becoming a spokesman for cancer survivors.

On August 30, 2025, Giuliani's car was rear-ended on a New Hampshire highway. Shortly before, he had stopped to help a woman who had flagged him down, then he had resumed travel. His car was in motion when he was hit from behind by a speeding vehicle. He suffered arm and leg injuries, a fractured vertebra, cuts and bruises.

In early May 2026, Giuliani was hospitalized with pneumonia. As of May 3, he was in critical but stable condition. It was unclear how long he had been hospitalized. He was released from the hospital the same month.

== Awards and honors ==
In 1989, Syracuse University awarded Giuliani an honorary law degree; in 2022, the university announced that it was developing a process that would allow them to revoke Giuliani's degree. In 1998, Giuliani received the Hundred Year Association of New York's Gold Medal Award "in recognition of outstanding contributions to the City of New York". In December 2001, Giuliani was made Knight Grand Cross of the Order of Merit of Savoy by motu proprio. For his leadership on and after the September 11 attacks, Giuliani was made an honorary Knight Commander of the Order of the British Empire by Her Majesty Queen Elizabeth II on February 13, 2002. He was awarded Medal of Heroism by Czech president Václav Havel on October 28, 2002.

Giuliani was named the Time "Person of the Year" for 2001. In 2002, the Episcopal Diocese of New York gave Giuliani the Fiorello LaGuardia Public Service Award for Valor and Leadership in the Time of Global Crisis. Also in 2002, former first lady Nancy Reagan awarded Giuliani the Ronald Reagan Freedom Award, and he received the U.S. senator John Heinz Award for Greatest Public Service by an Elected or Appointed Official, an award given out annually by Jefferson Awards. In 2003, Giuliani received the Academy of Achievement's Golden Plate Award. Also in 2003, he was awarded a Doctor of Laws honoris causa by the University of Rhode Island, which was revoked in January 2022.

In 2004, construction began on the Rudolph W. Giuliani Trauma Center at St. Vincent's Hospital in New York. In 2005, Giuliani received honorary degrees from Loyola College in Maryland and Middlebury College. In 2006, Giuliani and his wife were honored by the American Heart Association at its annual Heart of the Hamptons benefit in Water Mill, New York. In 2007, Giuliani received an honorary doctorate in public administration from The Citadel, The Military College of South Carolina. In 2021, Middlebury announced that it was revoking the degree given to Giuliani. Also in 2007, Giuliani was honored by the National Italian American Foundation (NIAF), receiving the NIAF Special Achievement Award for Public Service, and was awarded the Margaret Thatcher Medal of Freedom by the Atlantic Bridge. In the 2009 graduation ceremony for Drexel University's Earle Mack School of Law, Giuliani was the keynote speaker and recipient of an honorary degree; in 2021, Drexel announced that it was rescinding the degree. Giuliani was the Robert C. Vance Distinguished Lecturer at Central Connecticut State University in 2013.

In September 2025, President Donald Trump announced he would award Giuliani the Presidential Medal of Freedom.

== In popular culture ==
During his career, Giuliani was referenced in popular culture through television and other media. In 1993, he made a cameo appearance as himself in the Seinfeld episode "The Non-Fat Yogurt", which is a fictionalized account of the 1993 mayoral election. Giuliani's scenes were filmed the morning after his real-world election. In late 2000, Giuliani made an appearance as himself in the 11th season Law & Order episode titled "Endurance", where he introduces ADA Nora Lewin (portrayed by Dianne Wiest). In 2003, Giuliani was portrayed by James Woods in the USA Network television film Rudy: The Rudy Giuliani Story. In 2007, Giuliani guest starred as himself in The Simpsons episode "Stop, or My Dog Will Shoot!" In 2018, Giuliani was portrayed multiple times on Saturday Night Live by Kate McKinnon. McKinnon continued portraying him in 2019.

In 2020, Giuliani made a cameo appearance on a Netflix true crime limited series' Fear City: New York vs the Mafia, talking about his role in leading the 1980s federal prosecution of the Five Families. Also in 2020, Giuliani made an unwitting appearance in Borat Subsequent Moviefilm. In the mockumentary film, Giuliani agrees to an interview with Borat's "daughter", Tutar (played by actress Maria Bakalova), who is disguised as a reporter. When invited to Tutar's hotel room, Giuliani proceeds to lie on her bed and reach inside his trousers; they are immediately interrupted by Borat, who says: "She 15. She too old for you." Giuliani later disregarded the accusation, calling it a "complete fabrication" and saying he was rather "tucking in [his] shirt after taking off the recording equipment". In 2021, Giuliani won two Razzie awards for his part in the film: Worst Supporting Actor and Worst Screen Combo for his pants zipper.

== See also ==
- Electoral history of Rudy Giuliani
- List of alleged Georgia election racketeers
- Political positions of Rudy Giuliani
- Public image of Rudy Giuliani
- Russian interference in the 2016 United States elections
- Timeline of New York City, 1990s–2000s
- List of people granted executive clemency in the second Trump presidency

Legal offices
Preceded by John H. Shenefield	United States Associate Attorney General; 1981–1983	Succeeded by Lowell Jensen
Preceded by John Martin	United States Attorney for the Southern District of New York; 1983–1989	Succeeded by Benito Romano; Acting
Party political offices
Preceded by Diane McGrath	Republican nominee for Mayor of New York City; 1989, 1993, 1997	Succeeded by Michael Bloomberg
Preceded by Zell Miller	Keynote Speaker of the Republican National Convention; 2008	Succeeded by Chris Christie
Political offices
Preceded by David Dinkins	Mayor of New York City; 1994–2001	Succeeded by Michael Bloomberg
Awards and achievements
Preceded by Billy Graham	Recipient of the Ronald Reagan Freedom Award; 2002	Succeeded by George H. W. Bush
