= Electoral history of Rudy Giuliani =

List of elections featuring Rudy Giuliani as a candidate

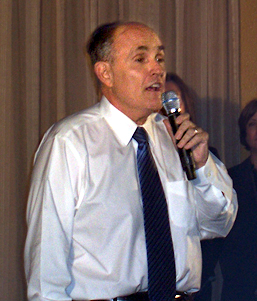

Electoral history of Rudy Giuliani, 107th Mayor of New York City and was a candidate for the 2008 Republican presidential nomination.

== 1989 Republican New York City mayoral primary ==
- Rudy Giuliani - 77,150 (67.02%)
- Ronald S. Lauder - 37,960 (32.98%)

== 1989 New York City mayoral election ==
- David Dinkins (D) - 917,544 (50.42%)
- Rudy Giuliani (R/Independence/Liberal) - 870,464 (47.84%)
- Henry F. Hewes (Right to Life) - 17,460 (0.96%)
- Ronald S. Lauder (Conservative) - 9,271 (0.51%)
- Lenora Fulani (New Alliance) - 1,732 (0.10%)
- James E. Harris (Socialist Workers) - 1,671 (0.09%)
- Warren L. Baum (LBT) - 1,118 (0.06%)

== 1993 New York City mayoral election ==
- Rudy Giuliani (R/Liberal) - 930,236 (50.91%)
- David Dinkins (D) (inc.) - 876,896 (47.99%)
- George J. Marlin (Conservative/Right to Life) - 15,926 (0.87%)
- Joseph Brennan (LBT) - 2,224 (0.12%)
- Mary Nell Bockman (Socialist Workers) - 2,057 (0.11%)

== 1997 New York City mayoral election ==
- Rudy Giuliani (R/Liberal) (inc.) - 783,815 (57.75%)
- Ruth Messinger (D) - 549,335 (40.48%)
- Sal F. Albanese (Independence) - 14,316 (1.06%)
- Peter J. Gaffney (Right to Life) - 5,304 (0.39%)
- Olga J. Rodriquez (Socialist Workers) - 3,753 (0.28%)
- Dominic Fusco (City Fusion) - 632 (0.05%)

== 2004 Minnesota Independence Party presidential caucus ==
- John Edwards - 335 (41.10%)
- John Kerry - 149 (18.28%)
- George W. Bush (inc.) - 94 (11.53%)
- Ralph Nader - 78 (9.57%)
- None of the above - 66 (8.10%)
- Dennis Kucinich - 40 (4.91%)
- Lorna Salzman - 9 (1.10%)
- John McCain - 9 (1.10%)
- Al Sharpton - 5 (0.61%)
- David Cobb - 4 (0.49%)
- Wesley Clark - 4 (0.49%)
- Joe Lieberman - 4 (0.49%)
- Howard Dean - 3 (0.37%)
- Jesse Ventura - 3 (0.37%)
- Gary P. Nolan - 2 (0.25%)
- Timothy J. Penny - 2 (0.25%)
- Kent P. Mesplay - 1 (0.12%)
- John B. Anderson - 1 (0.12%)
- Charles W. Barkley - 1 (0.12%)
- Dean M. Barkley - 1 (0.12%)
- Bill Bradley - 1 (0.12%)
- Rudy Giuliani - 1 (0.12%)
- Mickey Mouse - 1 (0.12%)
- Theodore Roosevelt - 1 (0.12%)

== 2008 Republican presidential primaries ==
As of May 2008:

- John McCain - 9,170,505 (45.33%)
- Mitt Romney - 4,651,349 (22.99%)
- Mike Huckabee - 4,252,906 (21.02%)
- Ron Paul - 1,069,294 (5.29%)
- Rudy Giuliani - 594,452 (2.94%)
- Fred Thompson - 294,412 (1.46%)
- Alan Keyes - 57,773 (0.29%)
- Uncommitted - 50,094 (0.25%)
- Duncan Hunter - 39,968 (0.20%)
- Scattering - 25,141 (0.12%)
- Tom Tancredo - 8,612 (0.04%)
- John Cox - 3,351 (0.02%)
- Sam Brownback - 2,838 (0.01%)
