= Lawsuits related to the 2020 United States presidential election =

Lawsuits related to the 2020 United States presidential election refers to either:

- Pre-election lawsuits related to the 2020 United States presidential election, filed before Election Day
- Post-election lawsuits related to the 2020 United States presidential election, filed during or after Election Day
