= Systematic Alien Verification for Entitlements =

Program managed by the US Department of Homeland Security

SAVE program logo

Systematic Alien Verification for Entitlements (SAVE) is a program managed by United States Citizenship and Immigration Services (USCIS), a branch of the US Department of Homeland Security (DHS). SAVE was created in 1986 and facilitates lookups on the immigration and nationality status of individuals in the United States. It is an intergovernmental initiative designed to help federal, state, tribal, and local government agencies, or by a contractor acting on the agency's behalf, to determine eligibility for benefits, licenses or grants, government credentials, or to conduct background investigations.

SAVE is one of two programs that uses the Verification Information System (VIS). The other program is the Electronic Employment Eligibility Verification Program, also known as E-Verify, and is used by employers to verify the immigration status of employees. For additional verification (in cases where VIS proves inadequate), SAVE relies on the Person Centric Query System (PCQS). Over time, the use of SAVE has been increasingly mandated for various federal and state programs.

In March 2025, Trump's Executive Order 14248^{[ws]} on "Preserving and Protecting the Integrity of American Elections" laid the base for DOGE to integrate SAVE with data from the Social Security Administration to enable cross checking voter registration and citizenship status via social security numbers.

== History ==
=== Creation and implementation, 1986–1996 ===
The original impetus to create the Systematic Alien Verification for Entitlements (SAVE) was in the Immigration Reform and Control Act of 1986 (IRCA), Public Law 99-603, which was passed by the 99th United States Congress and signed into law by then United States President Ronald Reagan.

The IRCA restricted access to six federal benefit programs to United States citizens, lawful permanent residents, and permanent residents under color of law (note that the jargon "federal public benefit" would be established much later, with the PRWORA). The Act required the Immigration and Naturalization Services (INS) to establish a system for verifying the immigration status of non-citizen applicants applying for these programs. The programs were:

- Aid to Families with Dependent Children and Medicaid (US Department of Health and Human Services). AFDC would later be replaced by Temporary Assistance for Needy Families (TANF)
- Temporary Unemployment Compensation Program (US Department of Labor)
- Title IV Educational Assistance Programs (US Department of Education)
- Some housing assistance programs (US Department of Housing and Urban Development)

The INS began to implement SAVE, with a two-stage verification process: Primary Verification and Secondary Verification. The electronic database, known as the Alien Status Verification Index, was initially maintained by Martin Marietta on contract with the INS, which in 1995 became Lockheed Martin.

The Personal Responsibility and Work Opportunity Reconciliation Act of 1996 (PRWORA) also commonly described as the 1996 Welfare Reform Act, Public Law 104-193, was passed by the 104th United States Congress and signed into law by then President Bill Clinton. The law was the cornerstone of the Republican Party's Contract with America and fulfilled Clinton's promise to "end welfare as we have come to know it." While its most famous component was the replacement of Aid to Families with Dependent Children (AFDC) by the more temporary and less generous Temporary Assistance for Needy Families, the law had lesser known provisions surrounding non-citizen eligibility for welfare benefits.

The law defined "federal public benefits" and "state and local public benefits." PRWORA required the Attorney General to establish regulations and interim guidance for the verification of immigration status of persons applying for federal public benefits, including benefits whose existing statutes did not specifically state that verification of immigration status was required. The guidance is for any entity administering a non-exempt federal public benefit, other than non-profit charitable organizations, and is not limited to the agencies and programs specified in IRCA or those using SAVE. However, SAVE helps with compliance with this guidance.

PRWORA made a distinction between two kinds of non-citizens, broadly defined:

- Qualified aliens are aliens who could in principle qualify for federal benefits (or state benefits with partial federal funding) that are accessible to citizens. However, even qualified aliens may have to meet conditions (such as work history, or presence in the United States for some amount of time) that citizens did not need to demonstrate. Qualified aliens include lawful permanent residents as well as those on asylum and humanitarian statuses.
- Non-qualified aliens are aliens who are ineligible for all federal benefits as well as state benefits with federal funding, with a few exceptions such as emergency health care or relief. Non-qualified aliens include all people in temporary nonimmigrant statuses (such as students and temporary workers) regardless of the duration of their stay. The other main category of non-qualified aliens is people who are not currently in authorized status, either due to unauthorized entry or because they fell out of status in the United States.

=== Illegal Immigration Reform and Immigrant Responsibility Act of 1996 ===
The Illegal Immigration Reform and Immigrant Responsibility Act of 1996 (IIRIRA ) under Bill Clinton required the Immigration and Naturalization Services that would later be restructured as the US Department of Homeland Security (DHS) and its sub-agency, United States Citizenship and Immigration Services (USCIS) to cooperate with federal, state, and local agencies to determine the citizenship or immigration status of any individual within the jurisdiction of the agency for any purposes authorized by law. The SAVE program has been the way that DHS and USCIS meet the obligation. IIRIRA also contained provisions that led to the creation of the "Basic Pilot Program", that would eventually morph into E-Verify, the analog of SAVE used by employers.

=== Expansion, 2005–2014 ===
The REAL ID Act of 2005 mandated that state-issued IDs such as driver's license or state ID cards could be used as proof of identity by the federal level only if they complied with specific compliance measures. Of the various federal identification purposes to which these compliance measures were relevant, the one with the largest affected population was commercial air travel in the United States. However, since most US states have not fully implemented the standards, the date from which only compliant IDs were accepted was pushed back to 2018.

One of the compliance requirements for state driver's licenses and identification cards is that State Department of Motor Vehicles must verify the legal presence status of non-citizens seeking these documents using SAVE. They can either directly enroll in SAVE, or use AAMVANet, the American Association of Motor Vehicle Administrators Network.

One of the consequences created by the REAL ID Act was that people on temporary non-immigrant statuses could be in legal status despite having an expired visa, and state offices were not necessarily equipped to evaluate the legality of their current status. SAVE has been intended to help with making less error-prone determinations of legal status for these cases. SAVE has had other issues, including not having up-to-date information for extensions of stay, extensions of stay for dependents, and change of status from student to temporary worker. US Immigration and Customs Enforcement provides guidance to students who encounter problems getting a driver's license or state identification card due to these issues.

On December 11, 2008, a System of Records Notice by DHS expanded the use of SAVE to any purpose authorized by law.

=== 2008 Mandate of E-Verify ===
Around 2008, E verify became a fully fledged program mandated for some employers. Until 2008, DHS conducted Privacy Impact Assessments (PIAs) for the individual systems used in SAVE and E-Verify, specifically the VIS and PCQS. However, in 2010, DHS switched to conducting PIAs for the programs as seen by their end users, i.e., PIAs for SAVE. and E-Verify.

Over time, the use of SAVE has been increasingly mandated for various federal and state programs. For example, the use of SAVE was optional for agencies administering the Supplemental Nutrition Assistance Program, but with the Agricultural Act of 2014 it became mandatory.

=== Integration of social security data, 2025 ===
At the end of the Biden administration USCIS was planning SAVE upgrades to enable checking voters' citizenship status. In March 2025, Trump's Executive Order 14148^{[ws]} laid the base for DOGE to integrate SAVE with data from the Social Security Administration. In April SAVE use became free of charge. In May it was reported that Palantir was contracted to employ its Gotham software for this purpose. As of June 2025, most states could not yet use SAVE to check eligibility for voter registration, because they did not collect Social Security numbers for voter registration. Furthermore, the DHS did not send a "system of records notice", as mandated by the Privacy Act of 1974, to give public notice, that there are new ways personal information is collected.

== Permissible uses and users ==
SAVE can be used by agencies of governments at any level in the United States, including:

- The federal government
- State governments
- Local governments (such as city and county governments)
- Tribal governments

A given agency is eligible to use SAVE only if determining the immigration and nationality status of individual is necessary for its work of one of these types:

1. Determination of eligibility for a federal, state, or local public benefit
2. Issuing a license or grant
3. Issuing a government credential
4. Conducting a background investigation
5. Any other lawful purpose

In addition to these, any contractor of an agency of the above description is eligible to use SAVE if the task contracted out to them requires immigration and nationality lookups for one of the above reasons.

SAVE does not itself make determinations regarding the applicant's eligibility for a benefit or license. Rather, it simply provides an easy way to pull information about the benefit or license applicant from a variety of government databases. As discussed later, the absence of matching records in SAVE does not imply that the applicant's presence in the United States is unauthorized, or that the applicant is ineligible for the benefit. It simply means that the records accessible were not able to confirm the applicant's eligibility.

== Use by customer agencies ==
=== General process ===
The general way SAVE is used is as follows. The noncitizen first submits all the necessary documentation for the program he or she is applying to; eligibility criteria can vary based on the person's immigration status, the state, and the program being applied to. If the documentation in principle demonstrates eligibility, the caseworker at the agency can use SAVE to verify that the documentation is accurate. If Initial Verification fails, then the caseworker can and must, if the applicant wants, submit the case for Additional Verification and then, if necessary, submit Form G-845. If the verification fails to demonstrate the validity of the documentation, the applicant is not granted the benefit. As of 2016, the caseworker could not use this failure to conclude that the applicant is lying about his/her status, or to use it to report the applicant to US Immigration and Customs Enforcement.

=== Modes and stages of verification ===
SAVE has three modes of electronic access that offer all of its basic functionality.

- Web-based access, through the USCIS website accessed through a secure web browser
- Web services, an interface that uses a direct machine-to-machine connection
- SAVE via AAMVAnet (VLS), available to Department of Motor Vehicles in US states

SAVE allows for three levels of verification for those using the system electronically.

Verification stage	Description	Modality	Backend system used	Time taken	Cost
Initial Verification using the Verification Information System	Relevant identifying data for the applicant is entered by the caseworker on a computer, and then a query is initiated to get confirmation of the validity of the records.	Electronic initiation by customer agency; queries are automated	Verification Information System (VIS)	The actual search takes 3 to 5 seconds; it may take a few minutes to enter all the relevant information to initiate the search.	$0.50, another $0.50 for retry
Additional Verification initiated using the Verification Information System	If the initial verification fails to turn up matches, or if there is a problem with the results, an additional verification can be initiated electronically by entering more information into the system	Electronic initiation by customer agency; queries are done by human Status Verifiers	Person Centric Query System (PCQS)	This usually takes about 3 to 5 federal government work days (or about one calendar week). The information is returned electronically.	$0.50
Document Verification Request (Form G-845)	If the additional verification fails to turn up the information sought, SAVE electronically notifies the customer agency to submit an electronically prepopulated Form G-845, Document Verification Request, by mail to the USCIS Immigration Status Verification Unit with a copy of the applicant's immigration documentation.	Electronic/Mail (the supporting documents need to be sent by mail) by customer agency; queries are done by human Status Verifiers	PCQS; in addition, it might lead to corrections of records in the USCIS' Central Index System (CIS)	This usually takes 10 to 20 federal government work days (or about one calendar week). The information is returned electronically.	no charge (only if both the initial and additional verification are carried out electronically). In case the additional verification step is skipped, charge of $0.50.

In addition, there is also an option of pure paper-based verification, where the agency directly submits a paper Form G-845, and gets a response within 10 to 20 federal government work days. This costs the customer agency $2, compared to the total maximum charge of $1.50 if initiating the query electronically. However, this option is discouraged since the use of electronic means for Initial Verification saves time and money for all parties involved.

==== Initial Verification ====
For Initial Verification, the authorized caseworker of the customer agency needs to first log into SAVE through the Verification Information System, after agreeing to the terms and conditions of usage. The caseworker may then choose the "Initiate Cases" tab, enter relevant information about the applicant whose status needs to be checked, and submit it. If matching records are found in the databases available to SAVE, these are returned. Some of these records may contain photos, which are also included in the response. The caseworker can respond whether the photo matches the corresponding photo submitted by the applicant or any other applicant photo. Only information related to the applicant is returned in the Initial Verification.

The Initial Verification process generally takes a few minutes while the actual search itself takes 3 to 5 seconds. The case is kept open for 180 days so the caseworker can access the case details at any time till then, and print out if needed after which it is closed if no action is taken during that time.

==== Additional Verification ====
If the Initial Verification provides the caseworker with all the information needed to confirm the applicant's documentation, no additional work needs to be done. However, an Additional Verification may be instituted electronically, through the SAVE interface in one of these two cases:

- SAVE is unable to find a record pertaining to the applicant.
- The caseworker or applicant has concerns about the information returned in the initial verification.

Additional Verification can take 3 to 5 government work days. This step involves USCIS Immigration Status Verifiers making more sophisticated queries to various databases (including DHS systems and DOJ's EOIR system), to locate the applicant's records. Status Verifiers have read-only access to information contained in many other systems through the Person Centric Query System. Once the Status Verifiers have completed their search, the information is returned electronically to the caseworker through the SAVE interface.

==== Form G-845, Document Verification Request ====
If the Additional Verification fails to turn up any information, or if the status verifier detects discrepancies that can only be resolved by examining the applicant's documentation, SAVE provides an electronic notification to the caseworker and recommends that the caseworker submit Form G-845, Document Verification Request, with a copy of the applicant's immigration documentation. An already-filled electronic form is made available to the caseworker, who needs to print and mail it to the USCIS Immigration Status Verification Unit.

If the caseworker submits these documents, status verifiers conduct a more thorough search using PCQS, and may also request record corrections to the USCIS Central Index System (CIS) database by contacting the USCIS Records Division. A response should generally be returned within 20 federal working days, which is usually about one calendar month. If USCIS does not respond within that time, the caseworker can call the USCIS toll-free number to inquire into the status of the case.

=== Costs ===
Customer agencies were charged on a per-query basis, with a cost of $0.50 each for initial verification, retry, and additional verification, and a cost of $2.00 for a paper G-845 if the verification process was not initiated electronically. Billing was monthly, and there was a minimum monthly service transaction charge of $25.00 if the SAVE program is used at all, any time within the month. There was no charge during months when SAVE was not used at all. This pricing structure for SAVE was effective since October 1, 2008. Billing was done by the USCIS's Burlington Financial Center, and agencies could pay by credit card and check.

=== Obligations of customer agencies ===
As of 2016, for a customer agency to sign up to use SAVE, the agency had to agree to SAVE's Memorandum of Agreement (MOA) (sometimes also called a Memorandum of Understanding (MOU)) or Computer Matching Agreement (CMA). This covers a range of topics:

1. The customer agency agrees to responsibilities regarding safe handling of information, minimum security standards for electronic transmissions, and breach incident notification. These provisions are compliant with requirements of the Federal Information Security Management Act of 2002 (FISMA), relevant Office of Management and Budget (OMB) guidance, and the US Department of Homeland Security Sensitive Systems Policy 4300A.
2. The customer agency agrees to various other obligations around the use of stages of verification. For instance, if the initial verification turns up no response, or if the information is inconsistent with what the applicant submitted, the agency must inform the applicant, and, if the applicant wishes to undergo additional verification, the agency must request additional verification.
3. The customer agency agrees to limit its determination of the applicant's immigration and nationality status to the limited purposes necessary for determining eligibility for the benefit.

Specific USCIS guidance on (3) is included below.

For applicants for the Supplemental Nutrition Assistance Program (SNAP; colloquially called "food stamps"):

- The caseworker will not determine that a household member is ineligible to receive food stamps because that person is in the US illegally unless specific documentation is provided showing illegal status.
- A caseworker must never assume that a household member is in the US illegally if they fail to provide documentation of their legal status.
- A report will not be made to the local USCIS office if the caseworker determines the alien is ineligible to receive benefits because the alien failed to provide documentation showing proof of legal status in the US
- If the caseworker receives a confession from a household member that they are in the US illegally, the caseworker will determine that the household member is ineligible to receive food stamps only if there is documentation that supports the confession. If there is no documentation that supports the confession, the caseworker will require the household member to provide documentation of legal status. If the household member does not provide the documentation, deny benefits for the household member for which information was not received.
- A report will be made to the local USCIS office only if a confession from the alien is received that they are in the US illegally and there is documentation that supports the confession.

For applicants of other programs:

- If an applicant fails to provide proof of legal alien status for a member of the household, the caseworker will not make any further investigation of the household member's legal status.
- If an applicant fails to provide documentation of legal alien status for a member of the household, the caseworker will consider the household member ineligible for public assistance due to failure to provide documentation of legal alien status.
- Since the caseworker did not determine the household member ineligible for benefits due to their illegal status, the household member will not be reported to USCIS.

== Use cases ==
The use of SAVE is governed by a number of federal and state rules, with some rules requiring the use of SAVE for some purposes, and other rules restricting the usage of SAVE and putting limits on the way customer agencies can use the information obtained from SAVE. SAVE has until 2025 not usually contained information about people who were citizens since birth. It also has not offered any conclusive information regarding immigration status, but has been a tool to help verify documentation of status that a person submitted.

=== Federal public benefits ===
Below is a list of federal public benefits where the use of SAVE is mandated for any non-citizens seeking those benefits. It has not generally been used to verify citizenship status for either birthright citizens or naturalized citizens, even though SAVE usually contains information for naturalized citizens. non-citizens can be divided into four broad categories: lawful permanent residents, those in asylum/humanitarian statuses, those in lawful temporary nonimmigrant statuses, and unauthorized aliens, i.e. those who entered unlawfully or are otherwise out of status. Aliens in the first two categories are called "qualified aliens" and are eligible for some federal public benefits, whereas those in the last two categories are called "non-qualified aliens" and are ineligible for all federal public benefits except emergency medical and relief services.

In the table below, "eligible at state option" means that individual states can set rules around eligibility within that category, i.e., they can choose to either provide the benefit or deny it. Since non-qualified aliens are eligible for none of the benefits (except emergency medical services) we only include columns on the two main types of qualified aliens.

Program	Source of funding	Level at which it is administered	Mandatory?	Eligibility for lawful permanent residents (a type of qualified alien)	Eligibility for humanitarian statuses (a type of qualified alien)	Historical context
Temporary Assistance for Needy Families (TANF) (colloquially called "welfare")	US Department of Health and Human Services (federal government)	State agencies	Mandatory for all non-citizen applicants	Ineligible for first five years in US; eligible at state option after that. However, those with a military connection are eligible regardless of time in the United States	Eligible for first five years after entry/grant of status; eligible at state option after that	The Immigration Reform and Control Act of 1986 required agencies participating in Aid to Families with Dependent Children (AFDC) to participate in the verification of any applicant's immigration status. Later, with the Personal Responsibility and Work Opportunity Act, AFDC was replaced by TANF, and the requirement to verify applicants' immigration status was transferred over to the new program.
Supplemental Security Income	Social Security Administration (however, it does not use the Social Security trust fund	Disability Determination Services (state agencies funded by the federal government), with final approval by SSA needed	Mandatory for all non-citizen applicants	Ineligible until naturalization, except military and grandfathered applicants, or those with a 10-year work history	Eligible for first 7 years after entry/grant of status; ineligible after that	In 1996, SAVE was not mandatory but was used by 160 offices with high caseloads. As of May 2013, the use of SAVE (either the online system or submission of Document G-845 for offices that were exempted from using the online system) was mandated.
Supplemental Nutrition Assistance Program (SNAP; colloquially called "food stamps")	Food and Nutrition Service under US Department of Agriculture	State agencies	Mandatory for all non-citizen applicants	Ineligible for five years after entry, except military and grandfathered cases, old people, children, and people with a substantial (10-year) work history	Eligible after entry/grant of status	Until 2014, the use of SAVE in SNAP was optional, but the Agricultural Act of 2014 mandated its use.
Medicaid	United States Department of Health and Human Services (HHS)	Centers for Medicare and Medicaid Services (CMS), in conjunction with state agencies; CMS is under HHS	Mandatory for all non-citizen applicants	Eligible if eligible for either TANF or SSI, or if pregnant or for emergency medical services	Eligible for 7 years after entry/grant of status, and eligible at state option after that	The IRCA of 1986 required all agencies participating in the Medicaid program to verify immigration status for non-citizens not using emergency medical services, through the program that would later become SAVE. Note that everybody is eligible for emergency services and SAVE need not be used to determine immigration status if Medicaid funds are being used solely for emergency services.
Temporary Unemployment Compensation Program	US Department of Labor (federal government)	State unemployment agencies	Mandatory for all non-citizen applicants	Eligible if the worker spent some time in LPR status employed and paying payroll taxes	Eligible (some fine print)	The IRCA of 1986 required all agencies administering this program to verify immigration status for non-citizens.
Title IV Educational Assistance (this refers to Title IV of the Higher Education Act of 1965)	United States Department of Education	Federal Student Aid, an office of the Department of Education	Mandatory for all non-citizen applicants	Eligible	Eligible, usually after having spent at least one year in the United States	The IRCA of 1986 has required verification of immigration status for all non-citizen applicants
Housing assistance programs	US Department of Housing and Urban Development (HUD)	Varies based on the program, but include local public housing authorities (PHAs) and property owners	Mandatory for all non-citizen applicants	Eligible	Eligible	The IRCA of 1986 mandated verification of immigration status for some housing assistance programs. Prior to PRWORA (1996), HUD released regulations based on Section 214 that established a standard for verifying an applicant's aimmigration status. After the passage of PRWORA, the criteria became more standardized. SAVE is used to determine immigration status and eligibility for all non-citizens.

=== State identification cards and driver's licenses ===
The set of people eligible for driver's licenses and identification cards is larger than the set of people eligible for federal public benefits. In particular, anybody who is lawfully present in the United States in a long-term non-immigrant status can get a driver's license or identification card, subject to the same requirements (proof of residency, and passing the requisite age criteria and competence tests) as United States citizens. This includes:

- Students and exchange visitors on F, M, and J statuses.
- Those on temporary work statuses such as H-1B

However, those who are not in authorized status either because they entered unlawfully, or because they have fallen out of status due to overstay or violation of the terms of their status are not eligible for driver's licenses or identification cards. People on short-term trips, such as those who have entered using B visas, the Visa Waiver Program or border crossing cards, are also not eligible for this identification.

Unlike the case of federal public benefits, states are not mandated to use SAVE to determine eligibility for driver's licenses or identification cards. However, the REAL ID Act set compliance standards that state-issued driver's licenses and identification cards have since needed to meet in order to be considered identification for federal purposes, including travel by commercial air carriers. One of these requirements is that the immigration status of any non-citizen applying for the identification must be verified using SAVE.

=== Voting eligibility ===
In the United States, citizens are eligible to vote in federal elections, as well as in state and local elections, subject to various conditions such as those related to age and residence. Non-citizens are not eligible to vote in any federal, state, or most local elections. In the late 2000s and 2010s, there have been concerns about non-citizens voting in elections. In order to address this, some state governments have considered using SAVE to help verify citizenship. Historically, SAVE contained information primarily for naturalized citizens and not for citizens at birth (except people who have sponsored someone to immigrate to the United States). As a result, SAVE on its own could not be used to make a confident determination of citizenship. For this reason, as well as the added burden of SAVE and its potential to discourage people from voting, the use of SAVE for voter eligibility was criticized.

Beginning in March 2025, the U.S. Citizenship and Immigration Services (USCIS) announced changes to SAVE and encouraged state and local agencies to use the system for voter eligibility verification. USCIS subsequently reported an agreement with at least 28 states to use the SAVE tool. In June 2026, a federal court ruled that these changes were unlawful and that SAVE data cannot be used in its current form to check voter registration records. The decision was subject to ongoing litigation and appeal as of July 2026.

An analysis by the Center for Election Innovation & Research (CEIR) found that even the largest claims based on SAVE represented small fractions of states' active voter registration lists, and early announcements based on SAVE flags are frequently revised downward after further investigation using more accurate data.

== Services for applicants ==
The SAVE program allows applicants for whom a verification has been initiated and is pending to check the status of their verification online, using SAVE CaseCheck through a web browser. To verify identity, the applicant needs to fill in information similar to that needed to initiate a verification, as well as the verification case number. Note that only existing pending verifications can be looked up using SAVE CaseCheck. It is not possible for a prospective applicant to use this feature preemptively, before a verification is initiated by the agency using SAVE.

SAVE also provides guidance to benefits applicants regarding what USCIS or CBP agencies to contact to request corrections in the records that SAVE uses for verification.

== Data ==
=== Sources used ===
SAVE relies on data updated daily through downloads from a number of agencies operating under the US Department of Homeland Security. Below is a list of the databases from which SAVE gets daily updates as of 2011:

Database name	Responsible agency	What it includes
Arrival and Departure Information System (ADIS)	U.S. Customs and Border Protection (CBP)	Information on the arrivals and departures by the alien. This can be used to verify information in Form I-94 documentation presented by the alien.
Central Index System (CIS)	United States Citizenship and Immigration Services (USCIS), but referenced by the whole U.S. Department of Homeland Security (DHS)	CIS has an Alien File (A-File) for all aliens (people who are not United States citizens) who have had contact with any of the U.S. immigration agencies. This includes people who have visited in non-immigrant status as well as lawful permanent residents. CIS can be used as a reference for a person's immigration history.
Computer-Linked Application and Information Management System (CLAIMS) 3	USCIS	A system for providing and updating information about all petitions and applications submitted to the United States Citizenship and Immigration Services, with the exception of naturalization, refugee, and asylum petitions.
Computer-Linked Application and Information Management System (CLAIMS) 4	USCIS	A system for providing and updating information about naturalization petitions.
Enforcement Integrated Database (EID)	USCIS	All information pertaining to immigration enforcement for the individual, including criminal history and enforcement actions.
Enterprise Document Management System (EDMS)	unknown	unknown
Imagine Storage and Retrieval System (ISRS)	unknown	unknown
Marriage Fraud Amendment System (MFAS)	USCIS	This supports and maintains casework resulting from the Immigration Marriage Fraud Amendments of 1986.
Microfilm Digitization Application System (MiDAS)	USCIS	Preserves and digitally indexes approximately 85 million historic immigration related records previously stored on microfilm.
Refugee, Asylum, and Parole System (RAPS)	USCIS	Manages the program for refugees, asylees, and those on parole.
Reengineered Natuzation Application Casework System (RNACS)	USCIS	Formerly used to manage naturalization applications. The system has not been used since 2001, when CLAIMS 4 began to be used. However, historical records may still need to be accessed using this system.
Student and Exchange Visitor Information System (SEVIS)	Student and Exchange Visitor Program, a joint undertaking of U.S. Immigration and Customs Enforcement and the U.S. Department of State	

=== People included in database ===
SAVE can be used to get information supporting the veracity of documents and status claims for naturalized citizens, lawful permanent residents who are not citizens, and people in various non-immigrant statuses.

Until June 2025, applicants who are United States citizens since birth have not had presence in any of the databases accessible to SAVE, although those who have renounced US citizenship, or have otherwise come in contact with immigration enforcement may have some available data. For this reason, the absence of matching records found by SAVE so far could not be used to rule out the possibility that somebody is a United States citizen.

=== Data not returned to the customer agency ===
Based on a Memorandum of Agreement (MOA) between the DHS and the US Department of State in 2011, passport numbers were not included in the information returned to customer agencies using SAVE. However, the data is available to status verifiers when using the PCQS during the first Additional Verification stage and while doing the final verification based on Document G-845.

== Critical reception and response ==
=== 1995 review by the Inspector General of the Department of Health and Human Services ===
In 1995, the Office of the Inspector General of the US Department of Health and Human Services (HHS) conducted a review of SAVE at the request of the Administration for Children and Families (ACF), a division of HHS. The review focused only on aliens applying for Aid to Families with Dependent Children and Medicaid, the programs requiring the use of SAVE that HHS was responsible for. The review looked at verification requests between October 1992 and December 1993. It found that:

- States were not consistently performing the required secondary verification to validate aliens' status: Of the 268 cases examined, the review found 92 cases where secondary verification was not done. Of these, the states improperly made eligibility decisions without full development in 45 cases, and improperly relied on unauthenticated documentation in 47 cases.
- States were not documenting their case files to establish that they have obtained adequate and current responses from the SAVE verification process prior to initiating payment to aliens.
- States are unnecessarily querying the SAVE system in two ways: They are making queries for people who have vouched that they are citizens, and they make queries for aliens applying for Emergency Restricted Medicaid, that everybody is eligible for regardless of immigration status.
- Deficiencies existed in the design and operation of the SAVE data system.
- States were unable to consistently match and locate sample cases where an "institute secondary verification" message is generated by INS.

The report put most of the responsibility and blame on state agencies, and recommended to the ACF and the Health Care Financing Administration (HCFA) to remind state agencies of SAVE requirements. ACF, however, believed that the problems were more the result of poor design of the system by INS.

=== 2003 Government Accountability Office report on issuing Social Security numbers ===
As of 2003, the Social Security Administration used independent third-party verification of documentation submitted by noncitizens with the issuing agencies (US Department of Homeland Security and US Department of State) prior to issuing a Social Security Number. The verification of these documents involved using SAVE. A 2003 Government Accountability Office report highlighted potential weaknesses in the way SSA was using SAVE. In particular, it noted that whereas SAVE was able to verify the immigration status for the applicant based on the information provided by the applicant, SSA staff were neglecting to actually verify the authenticity of the documents themselves, making it possible to issue a SSN based on fake documentation corresponding to a real but different person. Other weaknesses in SSA's use of SAVE were also identified.

=== Private institutions ===
As of 2007 the Electronic Privacy Information Center has been critical of SAVE and of the expansion of the Basic Pilot Program (now E-Verify) that uses the same backend systems as SAVE.

The Immigration Policy Center has been critical of SAVE for the following reasons:

- The Compliance Tracking and Monitoring System (CTMS), intended to detect and prevent misuse of SAVE, is exempt from the provisions of the Privacy Act that require notifying individuals if their information has been wrongly disclosed.
- Since SAVE was expanded to allow its use for any purpose authorized by law, DHS has not discussed any due process or privacy protections to address potential for misuse of SAVE and deal with issues such as notice to affected individuals, redress if a benefit is wrongly denied or if SAVE is misused, or any evaluation of how the system is used or if it is accurate.

The IPC and as of 2012 the American Immigration Council have been critical of the use of SAVE for determining voting eligibility.

=== DHS and USCIS efforts to address criticism and concerns ===
As of 2010, DHS had a Compliance Tracking and Monitoring System (CTMS) for SAVE, to make sure that agencies using SAVE do not misuse it. CTMS has been exempt from some provisions of the Privacy Act.

As of 2016, DHS and USCIS made efforts to be more transparent about using SAVE and to improve monitoring of it.

- Privacy Impact Assessments (PIAs) are assessments of the system, the data sources it uses, what it is used for, and how it affects the privacy of the parties involved.
- System of Records Notice (SORN) are issued when making changes to the way SAVE is used or can be used by customer agencies, or making changes to the backend implementation.

== See also ==
- E-Verify
- Consular Consolidated Database
