= DPIA =

DPIA may refer to:

- Data protection impact assessment, a kind of Privacy Impact Assessment, in the General Data Protection Regulation of the EU
- Docking planned incremental availability, in the United States Navy; for example see USS Abraham Lincoln (CVN-72)
- Di-β-phenylisopropylamine, a drug
