= Class =

A class is generally a group or category defined by some classification.

Class, Classes, or The Class may refer to:

- Class (taxonomy), a taxonomic rank
- Class (knowledge representation), a collection of individuals or objects
- Class (philosophy), an analytical concept used differently from such group phenomena as "types" or "kinds"
- Class (set theory), a collection of sets that can be unambiguously defined by a property that all its members share
- Drug class, various pharmacological, chemical, and legal classifications of biologically active compounds
- Hazard class, a dangerous goods classification
- Social class, the hierarchical arrangement of individuals in society, usually defined by wealth and occupation

== Arts, entertainment, and media ==
- "The Class" (song), 1959 single by Chubby Checker
- Character class, in role-playing games and other genres
- Class95, an English-language radio station in Singapore

=== Films ===
- Class (film), 1983 American comedy drama movie
- The Class (2007 film), Estonian drama movie
- The Class (2008 film), French drama movie

=== Television ===
- Class (2016 TV series), BBC science fiction drama programme, a spinoff from Doctor Who
- The Class (TV series), 2006–2007 CBS sitcom
- Class (2023 TV series), 2023 Indian Hindi-language Netflix crime drama thriller

=== Literature ===
- Class: A Guide Through the American Status System, 1983 non-fiction book by Paul Fussell
- Class (Cooper book), 1979 non-fiction book by Jilly Cooper
- Class (Pacifico novel), 2014 novel by Francesco Pacifico
- Class (Rosenfeld novel), 2017 novel by Lucinda Rosenfeld
- The Class (Segal novel), 1985 novel by Erich Segal

== Computing ==
- Type class, a type system construct that supports polymorphism
  - Class (programming), programming construct for defining an object template
    - C++ classes, C++ language construct for defining an object template
    - Java class file, computer file containing Java bytecode
- Class attribute (HTML), a feature of many HTML and XHTML elements
  - Pseudo-class, cascading style sheet (CSS) construct for defining formatting
- Complexity class, a set of problems of related complexity in computational complexity theory
- Class (warez), a defunct group in the warez scene

== Education ==
- Class (education), a group of students attending a specific course or lesson
- Class, a course (education)
- Class, a lesson or course session, in education
- Classroom, a room where classes are held

== Law and government ==
- Class, a group of people involved in a class action lawsuit
- Classes of United States senators, for describing the schedules of elections for Senate seats

== Transportation ==
- Class (locomotive), a single design of a locomotive as assigned by the railroad
- Class rating, an allowance to fly aircraft of similar design
- Railroad classes in the United States
- Ship class, a group of ships of similar design
- Travel class, a quality of accommodation on public transport
- Vehicle size class, a way of classifying cars

== See also ==
- CLASS (disambiguation)
- Klass (disambiguation)
