= Political positions of the 2008 Republican Party presidential primary candidates =

The Following is a table which gives a basic overview of the beliefs of a selection of the Republican presidential candidates (including undeclared candidates and candidates with exploratory committees.)

== Color Coding ==
█ = Declared Candidates

█ = Candidates with Exploratory Committees

█ = Potential candidates (undeclared)

== Candidate Breakdown ==
=== Abortion ===
Note: The NARAL Rating is a tool used by the "Pro-Choice" camp that gauges how "Pro-Choice" or "pro-life" currently elected officials are (logically, the most current ratings would not apply to candidates not currently in office). This measure is taken by a partisan organization and its limitations should be acknowledged as such.

Candidate	Basic Beliefs	Voting Record/Qualifications	NARAL Rating	Quotes
Sam; Brownback	Is pro-life, and supports a "consistent life ethic."	SPONSORED the Partial-Birth Abortion Ban Act of 1999	0% (Pro-Life)	"Life is worthy of respect and protection from the moment of conception...I believe every life has meaning and purpose, and that the termination of life is taken too lightly in our country today. Abortion ends a human life. It destroys an individual who could have lived, worked, and contributed to our society. And has wiped out nearly an entire generation... I will continue to fight to protect life at every stage. I hope that one day America will remember the value we once placed on human life."
Newt; Gingrich	Is pro-life, but is unsure how a ban on abortion should be put into effect.	"I think that abortion should not be legal, and I think that how you would implement that I'm not sure."	Is personally against abortion. However, a woman has the right to choose. Believes that only the Supreme Court can overturn Roe v. Wade Supports public funding for abortion.	"I hate [abortion] ... However, I believe in a woman's right to choose." "There must be public funding for abortions for poor women.... We cannot deny any woman the right to make her own decisions about abortion."
Rudy; Giuliani; Beliefs	Reportedly supports a constitutional amendment banning abortion, but has said he would leave it to the states.	"First of all, it should be left to the states." "My convictions regarding the sanctity of human life are clear and consistent. They have been articulated as well as formulated into public policy without equivocation or wavering. I often say I did not become pro-life because of politics but rather I became involved in politics in large measure because of my strong pro-life convictions."	Hunter is adamantly pro-life, and believes that abortion should be banned through a Constitutional amendment. Has sought to implement the 14th amendment to humans in all states of life.	WROTE H. R. 618, a bill seeking to implement the equal protection clause of the 14th Amendment to humans at all stages of life.
Mike; Huckabee	0% (Pro-life)	"Our greatest obligation as elected leaders is to protect the American people, especially those who are incapable of protecting themselves."	Is pro-life, with rape and incest exceptions.	0% (Pro-life)
Duncan; Hunter	"I don't think a constitutional amendment is probably going to take place.... Just as I believe that the issue of gay marriage should be decided by the states, so do I believe that we would be better off by having Roe v. Wade return to the states."	While originally supporting abortion, Romney became pro-life in 2004. Opposes constitutional amendment banning abortion. Says to let the states decide.	"My own view is that abortion is not right. But states should be able to make their own decisions rather than have a single pronouncement by the federal government." "Life, from a scientific standpoint, begins at conception. I don't know when the soul, if you're religious, when the soul enters the body. My church doesn't teach that by the way, doesn't have an opinion on it. So I don't know when it does." "I believe women should have the right to make their own choice."	Believes in passing a constitutional amendment banning abortion, while pulling in the power of the judiciary. Is in favor of legislation requiring parental notification when a minor seeks an abortion.
John; McCain	VOTED FOR the Partial-Birth Abortion Ban Act. Voted AGAINST human embryonic stem cell research.	0% (Pro-Life)	"As a devout Christian, father, and grandfather, I am a strong believer in the right to life for the unborn child. For years, activist judges have undermined life. As president, I would stop this by appointing strict constructionists as judges, reining in the power of the judiciary, and supporting constitutional amendments that respect life."	Opposes a human life amendment. Believes that Roe v. Wade should be addressed by good judges.
Mitt; Romney	VOTED FOR the Partial-Birth Abortion Ban Act of 1999.	"The Roe v. Wade decision is bad law and bad medical science." "I believe that government should not interfere with individual convictions and actions in this area." "I do not believe that the federal government ought to be involved in that process....I think when you get right down to the question that you've posed, should the government come in and criminalize, let's say, a young girl and her parents and her doctor--which, as aiders and abettors, that would be involved--I think not."	—	—
Tom; Tancredo	—	—	—	—
Fred; Thompson	—	—	—	—

- Ron Paul supports life and opposes abortion. He believes the states should be allowed to pass laws governing abortion.

=== Immigration ===
The ABI rating is a rating given by an organization called Americans For Better Immigration, that "lobbies Congress for reductions in immigration numbers." and gauges how politicians currently in office have voted in accordance with their position. This measure is taken by a partisan organization and its limitations should be acknowledged as such.

Candidate	Basic Beliefs	Voting Record/Qualifications	ABI rating	Quotes
Sam; Brownback	—	—	D (23%)	—
Newt; Gingrich	Believes that America should secure her borders, and opposes amnesty. Also believes that business who hire illegal aliens should be punished by a fine.	—	—	"Along with total border control, we must make it easier for people who enter the United States legally, to work for a set period of time, obey the law, and return home. The requirements for participation in a worker visa program should be tough and uncompromising. The first is essential: Everyone currently working in the United States illegal must return to their home country to apply for the worker visa program. Anything less than requiring those who are here illegally to return home to apply for legal status is amnesty, plain and simple."
Rudy; Giuliani; Beliefs	—	New York City is currently a "sanctuary city".	—	—
Mike; Huckabee	Huckabee opposes amnesty to immigrants and supports the construction of a fence between the United States and Mexico. He says that law-abiding and tax-paying illegal immigrants should be allowed to choose between deportation and a rigorous citizenship process.."	—	—	"We need to know who is coming into our country, where they are going, and why they are here. We need to create a process to allow people to come here to do the jobs - plucking chickens, tarring roofs, picking fruits - that are going unfilled by our citizens. Besides stopping terrorists, we must weed out those with a criminal background or a communicable disease. We have to build a fence along our border with Mexico, parts of which will be electronic. We need more well-trained border agents and cooperation agreements with local and state law enforcement officials, so that we have a clear and consistent approach by all jurisdictions.".."
Duncan; Hunter	As a Representative from California, Hunter has taken strong positions on border security and is against illegal immigration. Strong advocate of the double fence along the border parallel to San Diego, which drastically reduced crime in San Diego.	—	A+ (97%)	—
John; McCain	Believes in giving illegal aliens a 'path to citizenship'. However, after being grilled with questions about immigration during campaign stops, is considering a "new position".	Is currently writing the Kennedy-McCain Bill which would provide illegal aliens a 'path to citizenship'. Critics have called this bill an 'amnesty bill'.	D (24%)	—
Mitt; Romney	Supports Border Fence and stationing of National Guard troops there. Would penalize employers who knowingly hire illegal immigrants.	—	—	—
Tom; Tancredo	Tom Tancredo adamantly opposes immigration reform and supports immigration inforcement. He is against amnesty for illegal aliens, believing that amnesty is a "slap in the face" to legal immigrants who go through the immigration process legally. Businesses that employ illegal immigrants should be fined. He also believes that securing our border will secure America and her sovereignty.	WROTE H.R. 946, which would place severe restrictions on immigration until the number of illegal immigration is less than 10,000. WROTE , H.CON.RES.37 calling for the pardon of Border Patrol Agents Ignacio Ramos and Jose Compean.	A+ (97%)	—
Fred; Thompson	—	Voted YES on allowing more foreign workers into the US for farm work. (Jul 1998) Voted YES on visas for skilled workers. (May 1998); Voted YES on limit welfare for immigrants. (Jun 1997)	—	—

- Ron Paul believes we must secure our borders now and that a nation without secure borders is no nation at all. He thinks it is senseless to fight terrorists abroad when our own front door is left unlocked.

=== War on Terror ===
Candidate	Basic Beliefs	Voting Record/Qualifications	—	Quotes
Sam; Brownback	—	—	—	—
Newt; Gingrich	Believes that the War on Terror is part of a larger conflict with an "irreconcilable wing of Islam"; Believes that the size of intelligence operations are at least 1/3 of what they should be.	"This wing of Islam, and its adherents and recruits, are irreconcilable because they cannot peacefully coexist with the civilized world" "The sobering reality is that terrorist leaders are determined to kill Americans and destroy our government and culture."	As Mayor, personally oversaw and coordinated New York City's handling and response to the September 11th, 2001 terrorist attacks on the World Trade Center, widely considered the first major battle in America's War on Terror.	Huckabee believes that the War in Iraq is an "ideological war on terror". He supports troop surges as opposed to troop withdrawal.
Rudy; Giuliani; Beliefs	"I am focused on winning. Withdrawal would have serious strategic consequences for us and horrific humanitarian consequences for the Iraqis. If we leave, Iraq's neighbors on all sides will face a refugee crisis and be drawn into the war" "[Those who support withdrawal] are Monday morning quarterbacking when it's only halftime."	Believes that intelligence agencies must be given the proper resources to protect America.	Was the Charmain of the House Committee of the Armed forces from 2003-2007	Former Vietnam P.O.W.
Mike; Huckabee	Supportive of decision to invade Iraq. Critical of the handling of the war.	Has recently said he will back a classified timeline of troop withdrawal.	The War on Terror is a war of ideology between Western Civilization and Islamism.	"We are, I believe, in a clash of civilizations" "The clash of civilizations is not with the religion of Islam, but with the Islamic religion that has been married to a political philosophy that says that all nonbelievers must be annihilated, abolished, eliminated. It is with people who have openly and repeatedly stated that their desire is to kill you and your children, me and my children, to eradicate us from the planet because we do not accept their political and religious ideologies."
Duncan; Hunter	Studies national security and intelligence (China, North Korea, and Russia) for the American Enterprise Institute.	—	—	—
John; McCain	—	—	—	—
Mitt; Romney	—	—	—	—
Tom; Tancredo	—	—	—	—
Fred; Thompson	—	—	—	—

- Ron Paul opposes the continued occupation of Iraq. He believe the military actions were not approved by Congress as a declaration of war and are unconstitutional.
