= Klass =

Klass is a Germanic surname. Notable people with the surname include:

- Alisha Klass (born 1972), American pornographic actress
- Christa Klaß / Christa Klass (born 1951), German politician
- Craig Klass (born 1965), former water polo player
- David Klass (born 1960), American screenplay writer and children's author
- Edward Klass (born 1965), American water polo player
- Eugene Klass (1919-2009), known as American actor Gene Barry
- John Klass (born 1975), triple-platinum award-winning singer/producer/songwriter/radio presenter
- Günter Klass (1936-1967), German race driver
- Myleene Klass (born 1978), British musician, former member of the UK pop group Hear'Say
- Perri Klass (born 1958), pediatrician and writer
- Philip Klass (1920-2010), American science fiction writer under the name William Tenn
- Philip J. Klass (1919–2005), American UFO researcher
- Salomon Klass (1907–1985), a Finnish soldier
- Sholom Klass (1916–2000), Rabbi and editor of The Jewish Press

== See also ==
- 7277 Klass (1983 RM2), main-belt asteroid discovered 1983
- Klass (album), an album by Bad Manners
- Klass, Ilmar Raag's movie about school violence
- Class (disambiguation)
- Clazz (disambiguation)
