= CLASS =

CLASS may refer to:

== Organizations ==
- Canadian Light Aircraft Sales and Service, a Canadian aircraft manufacturer
- Class (warez), a group from 1997 to 2004
- College of Liberal Arts and Social Sciences, an academic college at the University of Houston, US
- Centre for Labour and Social Studies, chaired by Laura Pidcock

== Science and technology ==
- Canadian Land Surface Scheme, for use in large scale climate models
- Cosmology Large Angular Scale Surveyor, an experiment to measure the polarization of the cosmic microwave background
- Custom Local Area Signaling Services, which describes telephony terms e.g. call waiting, caller ID

== Other ==
- Consular Lookout and Support System, a system supporting the U.S. Department of State's Bureau of Consular Affairs

== See also ==
- Class (disambiguation)
