= Consular Consolidated Database =

The Consular Consolidated Database (CCD) is a database used by the Bureau of Consular Affairs under the United States Department of State, that has over 290 million passport records, 184 million visa records, and 25 million records of U.S. citizens living overseas, and adding 35,000 visa cases a day.

== History ==
=== Size estimates ===
| Year | Estimated number of passport records in CCD | Estimated number of visa cases in CCD | Estimated number of photographs in CCD | Estimated number of records in CCD of U.S. citizens living overseas | EStimated daily rate of growth of visa cases |
|---|---|---|---|---|---|
| 2009 | No estimate | 100 million+ | 75 million+ | No estimate | 35,000 |
| 2016 | 290 million | 184 million | No estimate | 25 million | No estimate |

=== Privacy Impact Assessments ===
A number of Privacy Impact Assessments have been conducted for CCD. The list below is not necessarily comprehensive.

| Year | Month and date | Number of pages | Additional notes |
|---|---|---|---|
| 2008 | December 11 | 9 | -- |
| 2010 | March 22 | 20 | Original document seems unavailable online (except via Wayback Machine); however, it is referenced in a few places. |
| 2015 | July 17 | 15 | -- |

=== Qualitative history ===
Some CCD records date back to the mid-1990s. Since February 2001, CCD has stored photographs of all visa applicants in electronic form. Since 2007, CCD has been storing ten-print scans.

On July 19 or 20, 2014, after a software update, CCD started having significant performance issues. On July 23, CCD was brought back online with limited capacity. The Department of State worked with Microsoft and Oracle to restore the old level of performance. Due to issues with CCD, visa caseload processing was slowed down, disrupting travel experiences of people around the world. The system was processing at normal rates as of August 2, but the problem was declared fully fixed a month later.

A Congressional Research Service report about visa issuances, published November 18, 2015, discussed the CCD at some length.

In April 2016, it was revealed that an internal review by the U.S. Department of State of its cyber-defenses had found that CCD was at risk of being compromised, though no breach had been detected.

== Linked databases ==
The following are the two main databases linked with CCD:

- Automatic Biometric Identification System (IDENT; formerly ABIS) managed by the U.S. Department of Homeland Security
- Federal Bureau of Investigation (FBI) Integrated Automated Fingerprint Identification System (IAFIS)

The Department of State's Bureau of Consular Affairs additionally uses data from the Consular Lookout and Support System (CLASS) to augment the data in CCD when processing visa cases.

The 2015 Privacy Impact Assessment for CCD gives a lengthy list of systems within the Department of State that are connected to CCD. The 2008 PIA lists a number of databases with which there is bi-directional data flow, along with the type of data in each, but the list may be outdated.

== See also ==
- E-Verify
- Systematic Alien Verification for Entitlements
- Consular Lookout and Support System
