= CCDS =

CCDS is an abbreviation that may refer to:

- Canton Country Day School, a private, secular PK-8 school located in Plain Township, Stark County, Ohio
- Charlotte Country Day School, a private, secular K-12 school located in Charlotte, North Carolina
- Cincinnati Country Day School, a non-parochial, private school in Indian Hill, Ohio
- Committees of Correspondence for Democracy and Socialism, an American democratic socialist organization
- Consensus CDS Project, a global bioinformatics project involving the NCBI, EBI, WTSI and UCSC

== See also ==
- CCD (disambiguation)
