= C18H23N =

The molecular formula C_{18}H_{23}N (molar mass: 253.38 g/mol, exact mass: 253.1830 u) may refer to:

- Tolpropamine
- Trimethyldiphenylpropylamine (N,N,1-Trimethyl-3,3-diphenylpropylamine)
- Di-β-phenylisopropylamine
