= Public image of Rudy Giuliani =

Former mayor of New York

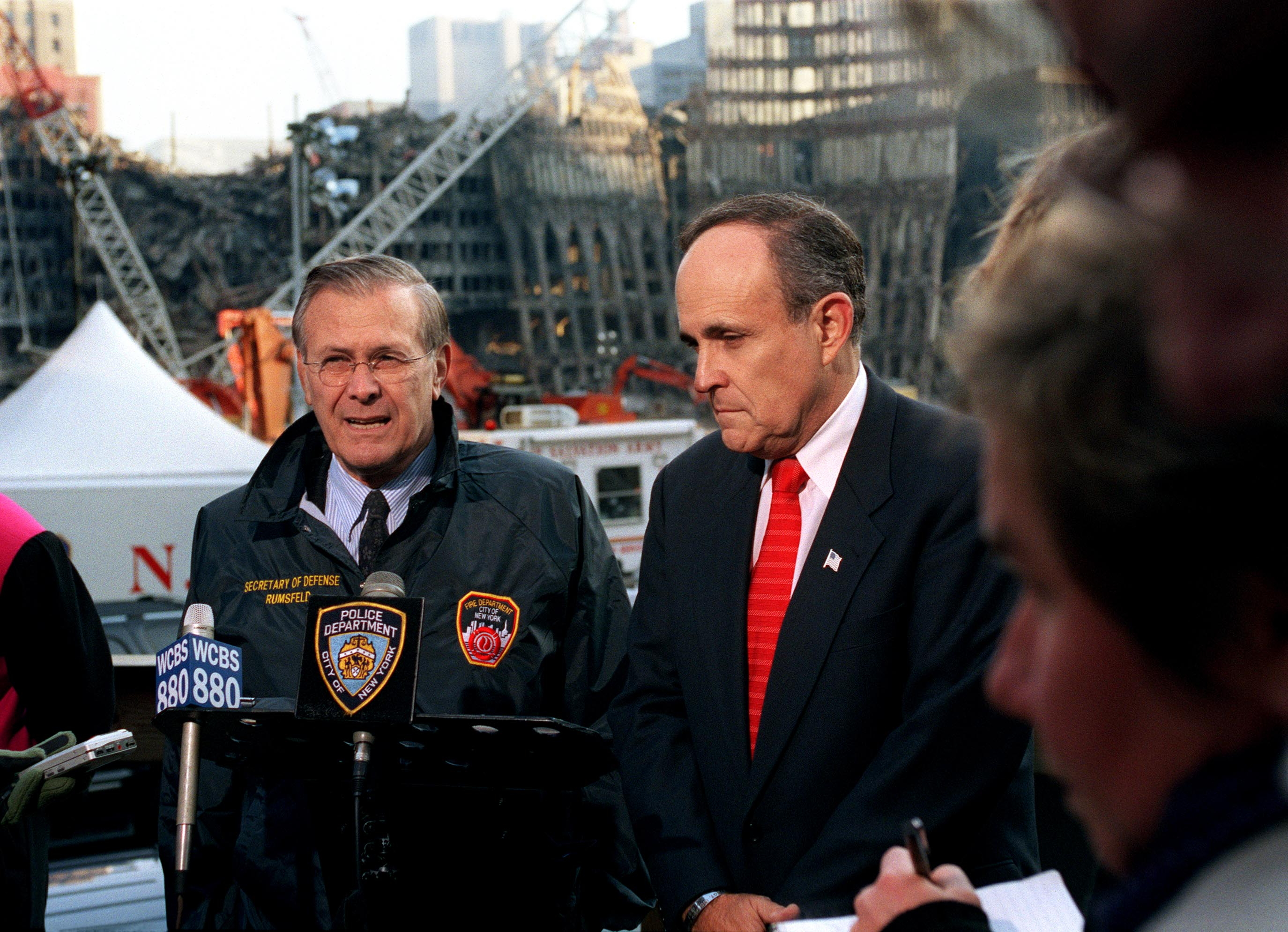
Donald Rumsfeld and Rudy Giuliani at the site of the World Trade Center, on November 14, 2001.

Mayor of New York City from 1994 to 2001, and a candidate for President of the United States in 2008, Rudy Giuliani was both glorified and criticized in the public sphere for his past actions. Many credited him with reducing crime and improving the city's economy and lauded his leadership during the September 11, 2001 attacks and his coordination of the emergency response in the immediate aftermath. Others disapproved of his policies and political positions as Mayor and candidate and criticized the perceived glorification of his role in the aftermath of 9/11 during the 2008 campaign.

Poll numbers throughout 2007 suggested that Giuliani was the front-runner among other Republican candidates for the party's 2008 presidential nomination. Although the status fell with his looming exit from the race, Giuliani continued to be perceived as strong on terrorism.

== Philosophy ==
Giuliani is a Roman Catholic who is pro-choice, supports same-sex civil unions, and embryonic stem cell research. As a candidate in 2008, Giuliani did not stray from his stances, remarking that it is better to make abortion rare and increase the number of adoptions rather than to criminalize the practice. As mayor, the abortion rate in New York City dropped by 16% in comparison to the 12% drop nationally. Adoptions rose 133% while he was mayor. Some social conservatives accepted this as a reason for their support of Giuliani, contending that his position on abortion was the most pragmatic view taken by an anti-abortion candidate in the 2008 election. They also approved of his pledge as a presidential candidate, that he would nominate Supreme Court Justices in the mold of John Roberts, Samuel Alito, Antonin Scalia, and Anthony Kennedy (all Ronald Reagan appointees or former colleagues of Giuliani's from the Reagan Justice Department).

But some anti-abortion groups, such as the Republican National Coalition for Life, strongly opposed Giuliani's positions and campaigns. Some Catholic archbishops came forward arguing that his views on abortion were not consistent with the teachings of the Catholic Church. Joseph Cella, president of a Catholic advocacy group in Michigan stated, "It's becoming ever more clear that Rudy Giuliani suffers from John Kerry syndrome. It's just a matter of time before more bishops step up, because he shares the identical position on abortion as John Kerry and Hillary Clinton." Giuliani declined to discuss his religion when asked if he considered himself a "traditional, practicing Roman Catholic." Giuliani stated that his religion is a personal matter and that there should not be any religious test for public office. He explained further stating:

My religious affiliation, my religious practices and the degree to which I am a good or not so good Catholic, I prefer to leave to the priests, that would be a much better way to discuss it. That's a personal discussion and they have a much better sense of how good a Catholic I am or how bad a Catholic I am.

James Dobson, an influential Christian conservative leader, wrote that he could not fathom Giuliani's stance on the abortion issue and he would not vote for him if he were the Republican presidential nominee. He also cited Giuliani's three marriages and the former mayor's support for civil unions for gays as reasons why he could not support the candidate. Dobson wrote, "I cannot, and will not, vote for Rudy Giuliani in 2008. It is an irrevocable decision."

However, conservative political pundit George Will wrote near the end of Giuliani's time as mayor that he had run the most conservative government in America in the last 50 or 60 years. An August 2006 poll from Rasmussen Reports showed that the American public perceives Giuliani overall to be a moderate. Specifically, of those polled, 36% classified him as a moderate, 29% as a conservative, and 15% as a liberal, with the remaining 20% being unsure.

== Family life ==
Giuliani has been married three times. The dissolution of his marriage with Donna Hanover was detailed extensively in the news media. The circumstances of the separation along with his previous marriage to his second cousin also caused problems for Giuliani during his presidential run. At a public appearance in Derry, New Hampshire on August 16, 2007 an audience member, Katherine Prudhomme-O'Brien asked him, "[H]ow you could expect the loyal following of Americans when you are not getting it from your own family?"

Giuliani replied, "I love my family very, very much and will do anything for them. ... The best thing I can say is kind of, 'Leave my family alone, just like I'll leave your family alone.' "

== Leadership ==
There are many qualities that make a great leader. But having strong beliefs, being able to stick with them through popular and unpopular times, is the most important characteristic of a great leader.

— Rudy Giuliani, 2004 Republican National Convention

Supporters of Giuliani claim that while he was mayor of New York he displayed leadership skills in the aftermath of the World Trade Center Attacks. In 2002, Giuliani released a book called Leadership in which he gave techniques that he used while he was mayor. According to a Gallup Poll, taken February 9–11 2007, respondents who supported Giuliani for president were asked why they supported him. The results showed that 13% of supporters did so because of Giuliani's strong leadership and 53% did so because of leadership related topics such as time as mayor and handling of 9/11. Another poll taken by Marist, showed that 42% of Giuliani supporters believed that leadership is the most important quality for a candidate, this is compared to 34% of McCain supporters who believed the same.

However, Giuliani also has been criticized by vocal opponents from his mayoral days, homing in on Giuliani's support for the NYPD during the racially charged cases of Abner Louima and Amadou Diallo and his crackdown on porn shops in Times Square. In November 2006, civil-rights lawyer and frequent Giuliani critic Norman Siegel pledged to "swift boat" the former Mayor by bringing attention to these and other controversies.

A CNN/Opinion Research Corp. poll conducted November 28, 2007 found that in the state of Florida, where Giuliani campaigned most often during his presidential campaign, 53% of voters found Giuliani to be the best candidate to fight the war on terrorism. 33% of the Florida voters found Giuliani to be the best to deal with the Iraq conflict and 34% viewed him as the best candidate concerning economic issues.

=== Crime record ===
At the time Giuliani became Mayor, 2,000 murders occurred every year and 11,000 crimes occurred every week in New York City. With Giuliani as the mayor the crime rate dropped by 56% and is now considered one of the safest big cities in the country. Supporters of Giuliani contend that this is evidence of his leadership skills and efficiency.

NYC used to be known as one of the most dangerous cities in the nation. In the early 1990s, the city routinely suffered over 2000 murders a year. Under Rudy Giuliani's leadership, overall crime has been cut in half and murders have decreased by 70%. In fact, between 1993 and 1997, New York City accounted for 25% of the Nation's total crime decline and the FBI recognized New York as the 'Safest Large City in America.'

— RudyYes.com, "Proven Leadership", Dec 9, 1999

Statistics show that between 1993 and 1997 the decrease New York City crime accounted for 25% of the nation's overall crime decrease. Giuliani spokeswoman Maria Comella said, "Mayor Giuliani successfully worked to get guns out of the hands of criminals in order to transform a city out of control. By being tough on crime and enforcing the laws on the books, New York City's murder rate was cut by 66 percent."

However, the FBI warned against drawing broad conclusions from the decrease in crime. "These rough rankings provide no insight into the numerous variables that mold crime in a particular city. Consequently they lead to simplistic and/or incomplete analyses that often create misleading perceptions."

=== 9/11 ===
Giuliani is best known for his leadership role during the September 11 attacks. In the aftermath of the attacks, Giuliani gained the moniker "America's Mayor" and was named Time Magazine Person of the Year in 2001. His campaign used this image of leadership during crisis to drive his presidential campaign. Because of this, however, he was sometimes criticized and often parodied for over-emphasizing the importance of 9/11 and terrorism-related issues while campaigning. Joe Biden famously remarked of Giuliani, "There's only three things he mentions in a sentence – a noun, a verb, and 9/11.", and Comedy Central's The Daily Show had a recurring animation with an anthropomorphized "9" and "11" that played when lampooning the former mayor's 9/11 use. A BBC associate said, "Mr Giuliani's appeal as the man who led New York through the terrorist attacks is occasionally over-emphasised in his campaign."

The International Association of Fire Fighters issued a letter in 2007, accusing Giuliani of "egregious acts" against the 343 firemen who had died in the September 11th attacks. The letter asserted that Giuliani rushed to conclude the recovery effort once gold and silver had been recovered from World Trade Center vaults and thereby prevented the remains of many victims from being recovered: "Mayor Giuliani's actions meant that fire fighters and citizens who perished would either remain buried at Ground Zero forever, with no closure for families, or be removed like garbage and deposited at the Fresh Kills Landfill." The Giuliani campaign stated that the union was politically motivated from tough contract negotiations from Giuliani's second term as mayor and quoted a retired firefighter, Lee Ielphi (a father of 9–11 victim who was called to duty as a firefighter that day), saying "Firefighters have no greater friend and supporter than Rudy Giuliani." The union denied political motivation for the criticism. Jim Riches, an official at a firefighters' union and the father of a fallen Ground Zero firefighter, said, "We have all the UFA, the UFOA, and the fire members are all behind us – the International Association of Fire Fighters. ... And we're going to be out there today to let everybody know that he's not the hero that he says he is." The unions' complaints focus on the malfunctioning radios used by the fire department on September 11, 2001 and what they claim was a lack of coordination at the Ground Zero site.

In response to this image, Giuliani stated at a presidential debate that he "...would like people to look at my whole record. Long before September 11, 2001 ... the reason that I believe I'm qualified to be president of the United States is not because of September 11th, 2001. It's because I've been tested ... and I got very, very remarkable results. And that is the evaluation of other people, not me."

== Consideration for Secretary of State in Trump Administration ==
In November 2016, he was under consideration for Secretary of State in the Trump Administration. In terms of public image, he has received negative press for ties to foreign governments and foreign business activities.

== Cultural depictions ==
Giuliani and Donald Trump in a film clip shown at the 2000 New York Inner Circle press dinner.

The character of Giuliani portrayed on The Simpsons

Giuliani is known for dressing in drag. He did so on three occasions as Mayor of New York City between 1997 and 2000. Two of the appearances were for public roasts, and another was during an appearance on Saturday Night Live. During the 2000 appearance, Giuliani flirted with real estate mogul Donald Trump. Giuliani adviser Elliot Cuker claimed to have persuaded the politician to dress in drag in order to help him with the gay vote.

Giuliani was supposed to appear as himself on a May 2007 episode of The Simpsons entitled "Stop or My Dog Will Shoot", but his role was cut due to his presidential campaign. However, a "Simpsonized" image of the former Mayor was released for promotional purposes.

Giuliani was portrayed in the November 2019 South Park episode "Season Finale". He is referred to as a "treasonous pig" and not a "good lawyer".

Giuliani appeared in the 2020 film Borat Subsequent Moviefilm. His scene in the mockumentary was widely reported in multiple news sources, as Giuliani is shown reclining on a bed with his hands down the front of his pants while in a hotel room with an actress posing as a news reporter. Multiple sources reported on Giuliani's actions in the scene, with The Guardian calling it a "compromising scene". Giuliani denied any wrongdoing, claiming that the scene with him was "a complete fabrication" and that he had only been tucking in his shirt.

After the Four Seasons Total Landscaping press conference, Giuliani was portrayed by Saturday Night Live's Kate McKinnon on the show's "Weekend Update" news segment.
