= Consular Lookout and Support System =

System which supports the U.S. Department of State Bureau of Consular Affairs

The Consular Lookout and Support System (CLASS) is a system supporting the United States Department of State Bureau of Consular Affairs: it assists in decisions for visa and passport issuance and helps establish a person's eligibility for overseas services. It is used by U.S. Department of State passport agencies and consular posts as well as United States Department of Homeland Security and other border inspection agencies to perform namechecks on visa and passport applicants to identify individuals who may be ineligible for issuance or require other special action. Potential reasons for ineligibility include past criminal or terrorist activity.

== History ==
CLASS has been used since before the September 11 attacks of 2001. According to a report in October 2002: "The State Department indicated that at most overseas posts, consular officers relied primarily on the CLASS name check system to detect possible terrorists and did not place a special emphasis on using other elements of the visa process ..." The CLASS name check was historically done after reviewing the applicant's passport and other documents, and after an optional interview.

In the years following the September 11 attacks, more efforts were made to add more information to CLASS. The number of namecheck records in CLASS increased fivefold from 48,000 in September 2001 to approximately 260,000 in June 2005, according to consular officials. Also, as of fall 2004, CLASS had approximately 8 million records from the FBI. The Department of State also established a direct computer link with the FBI's National Crime Information Center (NCIC) to have information sent from NCIC to CLASS on a daily basis. However, the absence of specific information in CLASS about the nature of crimes (which made it difficult to distinguish between serious and minor crimes) made it hard for consular officers to use CLASS for rapid visa processing as of 2005.

Privacy Impact Assessments about CLASS have been published periodically, including in 2016 and 2018.

== Details ==
=== Child systems ===
CLASS includes the following child systems:

- eCLASS and iCLASS: These are the namecheck search engines that use a normalized and indexed Oracle database along with an array of Intel-based servers and intelligent load balancers to achieve the required throughput.
  - eCLASS performs namechecks against lookout databases.
  - iCLASS is used to vet electronic Diversity Visa (eDV) applicants and perform Consular Consolidated Database (CCD) queries.
- CXI consists of various components that provide database interfaces with agencies outside of the State Department as well as overseas and domestic internal sources whereby these organizations can provide and receive updates to namecheck data.
- webCLASS is used to perform a required namecheck from any authorized user on the Department of State OpenNet system through the website driven namecheck system.
- Telecommunications Manager (TCM) is a software application that serves as a connection point (middle-tier) between Consular Affairs (CA) client systems and the namecheck system database, Consular Lookout and Support System (CLASS). TCM performs two main functions: translation and routing.

=== Data sharing with other systems ===
Data from the following systems is forwarded to CLASS for namecheck purposes; in addition, information about visa refusal is also forwarded to CLASS from the visa or passport office:

- Non-Immigrant Visa (NIV): Visa query, bi-directional flow
- Immigrant Visa Overseas (IVO): Visa query, bi-directional flow
- Consular Consolidated Database (CCD)
- American Citizen Services (ACS): Passport query, bi-directional flow
- Independent Namecheck (INK): Namecheck query, bi-directional flow
- Travel Document Issuance System (TDIS): Namecheck query, bi-directional flow
- Passport Lookout Tracking System (PLOTS): Namecheck query, bi-directional flow
- Tracking Responses and Inquiries for Passports (TRIP): Passport query, bi-directional flow
- Passport Information Electronic Records System (PIERS): Passport and Consular Lost and Stolen Passports (CLASP) query, bi-directional flow
- Passport Records Imaging System Management (PRISM): Passport query, bi-directional flow
- Diversity Visa Information System (DVIS): Visa query, bi-directional flow

Information from the following law enforcement agencies may be forwarded to CLASS:

- Interpol
- United States Department of Health and Human Services (HHS)
- U.S. Department of Homeland Security (DHS)
- United States Marshals Service (USMS)
- Federal Bureau of Investigation (FBI)
- Threat Screening Center (TSC)
- Drug Enforcement Administration (DEA)
- Treasury Enforcement Communications System (TECS)
- Social Security Administration (SSA)
- Internal Revenue Service (IRS)

CLASS shares information with the following agencies, all via the Consular Consolidated Database (CCD):

- Interpol: Lost and stolen passport information is sent to Interpol for the international database of Stolen and Lost Travel Documents (SLTD).
- Treasury Enforcement Communications System (TECS): TECS is used extensively by the law enforcement community and at ports of entry to identify individuals and businesses suspected of or involved in violation of federal law. CLASS updates TECS in real time with visa refusals and lookouts, foreign lost and stolen passports, and U.S. lost and stolen passport.
- National Counterterrorism Center (NCTC)
- Canada Beyond the Border (BtB): CLASS provides a service that allows the Immigration Refugees and Citizenship Canada (IRCC) to run namechecks against CLASS and receive a filtered response, that includes information on foreigners of mutual interest to the US and Canada.
- Federal Bureau of Investigation (FBI) Brady Act: CLASS sends a list of persons who have renounced US citizenship to the National Instant Criminal Background Check System (NICS).

== See also ==
- Consular Consolidated Database
