= CCD =

CCD may refer to:

== Science and technology ==
- Charge-coupled device, an electronic light sensor used in various devices including digital cameras
- .ccd, the filename extension for CloneCD's CD image file
- Carbonate compensation depth, a property of oceans
- Colony collapse disorder, a phenomenon involving the abrupt disappearance of honey bees in a beehive or Western honey bee colony
- centicandela (ccd), an SI unit of luminous intensity denoting one hundredth of a candela
- Central composite design, an experimental design in response surface methodology for building a second order model for a response variable without a complete three-level factorial
- Complementary cumulative distribution function
- Continuous collision detection, especially in rigid-body dynamics
- Countercurrent distribution, used for separating mixtures
- Core complex die, an element of AMD Zen 2 and later microprocessor architectures

=== Medicine ===
- Canine compulsive disorder, a behavioral condition in dogs, similar to human obsessive-compulsive disorder (OCD)
- Caput-collum-diaphyseal angle, the angle between the neck and the shaft of the femur in the hip
- Cleidocranial dysostosis (also called cleidocranial dysplasia), a genetic abnormality in humans
- Central core disease, a rare neuromuscular disorder
- Congenital chloride diarrhea, a rare disorder in babies
- Continuity of Care Document, an XML-based markup standard for patient medical document exchange
- Cross-reactive carbohydrate determinants, protein-linked carbohydrate structures that have a role in the phenomenon of cross-reactivity in allergic patients
- Cortical collecting duct, a segment of the kidney

== Politics and government ==
- Census county division, a term used by the US Census Bureau
- Center City District, an economic development agency for the Center City area of Philadelphia
- Consular Consolidated Database, a database used for visa processing by the Bureau of Consular Affairs, US Department of State

== Religion ==
- Confraternity of Christian Doctrine, a religious instruction program of the Catholic Church

== Organizations ==
- Café Coffee Day, a chain of coffee shops in India
- Country Club of Detroit
- Centre of Cricket Development, a cricket team; see Namibia Cricket Board
- Cricket Club of Dhakuria; see Gopal Bose

=== Education ===
- Community College of Denver, a public college in Denver, Colorado
- Cincinnati Country Day School, a non-parochial, private school in Indian Hill, Ohio

=== Non-governmental ===
- Christian Care Foundation for Children with Disabilities, in Thailand
- Council for a Community of Democracies, in the US
- Canadian Coalition for Democracies, a former advocacy organization in Canada

=== Politics and government ===
- Centro Cristiano Democratico (Christian Democratic Centre), a defunct Italian political party

== Other uses ==
- Convention Centre Dublin, Ireland
- Clandestine detention center (Argentina) (centros clandestinos de detención), used by Argentina from the mid-1970s to the early 1980s
