= E-Verify =

Website to determine US work eligibility

E-Verify logo

A map of U.S. state laws requiring the use of E-Verify as of 2015: State requires E-Verify for most public employers State requires E-Verify for some public contractors and subcontractors State requires E-Verify for all employers

E-Verify is a United States Department of Homeland Security (DHS) website that allows businesses to determine the eligibility of their employees, both U.S. and foreign citizens, to work in the United States. The site was originally established in 1996 as the Basic Pilot Program to prevent companies from hiring people who had violated immigration laws and entered the United States unlawfully. In August 2007, the DHS started requiring all federal contractors and vendors to use E-Verify. The Internet-based program is free and maintained by the United States government. While federal law does not mandate use of E-Verify for non-federal employees, some states have mandated use of E-Verify or similar programs, while others have discouraged the program.

E-Verify compares information from an employee's Employment Eligibility Verification Form I-9 to data from U.S. government records. If the information matches, that employee is eligible to work in the United States. If there is a mismatch, E-Verify alerts the employer and the employee is allowed to work while resolving the problem. Employees must contact the appropriate agency to resolve the mismatch within eight federal government work days from the referral date. The program is operated by the DHS in partnership with the Social Security Administration. According to the DHS website, more than 700,000 employers used E-Verify as of 2018.

Research shows that E-Verify harms the labor market outcomes of illegal immigrants and improves the labor market outcomes of Mexican legal immigrants and U.S.-born Hispanics, but has no impact on labor market outcomes for non-Hispanic white Americans. A 2016 study suggests that E-Verify reduces the number of unauthorized immigrants in states that have mandated use of E-Verify for all employers, and further notes that the program may deter irregular immigration to the United States in general.

== History ==
The program was originally established in 1997 as the Basic Pilot program, a four-year pilot of a program that allowed employers to search government agencies' databases in order to determine whether a worker is legally allowed to work in the U.S. Along with two other pilot programs, it was created to protect jobs for authorized U.S. workers and to ensure a legal workforce in the United States. At the time, there was also another pilot program, the Employment Verification Pilot, could only verify work authorization for non-U.S. citizens; anyone who claimed to be a citizen could not be verified. Another pilot program, the Citizen Attestation Pilot, allowed employers to look up an employee's social security number in a database maintained by the Immigration and Naturalization Service. The Employment Verification Pilot and the Citizen Attestation Pilot were later discontinued.

Originally, an employer would hire an employee, have the Form I-9 filled out, and then call the Social Security Administration to ask whether the employee was either a U.S. citizen or a legal immigrant. If the Social Security Administration did not have that information, the employer would then look up the employee in a database maintained by the Immigration and Naturalization Services. If the employee was still not found, employer would need to call Immigration and Naturalization Services' office.

In the two years since Immigration and Customs Enforcement (ICE) finalized the regulations for electronically storing and/or generating I-9 records there has also been a steady increase in the number of administrative I-9 audits, in which employers are asked to deliver their I-9 records to ICE within 72 hours for inspection.

The United States Citizenship and Immigration Services (USCIS) Verification Division reported that over 16,000 E-Verify compliance letters were issued in Fiscal Year 2010. Another 13,000 letters and over 26,000 emails were sent to employers in Fiscal Year 2011. Additionally, another 23,000 e-mails were sent in the first half of Fiscal Year 2012, alone.

== Operations ==
All employers, by law, must complete Form I-9. E-Verify is closely linked to Form I-9, but participation in E-Verify is voluntary for most employers. After an employee is hired to work for pay, the employee and employer complete Form I-9. After an employee begins work for pay, the employer enters the information from Form I-9 into E-Verify. E-Verify then compares that information against millions of government records and returns a result.

On August 31, 2007, the program began to include facial image data to help enhance searches. The 14 million images kept by federal immigration authorities are being used in the program, and the government is in talks with some states to cross reference with state drivers license records.

== Impact ==
A 2015 study found that E-Verify reduced the average earnings of undocumented immigrants, improved labor market outcomes for male Mexican immigrants and U.S.-born Hispanic men, and had no impact on U.S.-born non-Hispanic whites. A 2016 study found that E-Verify "reduces the number of less-educated prime-age immigrants from Mexico and Central America—immigrants who are likely to be unauthorized—living in a state. We find evidence that some new migrants are diverted to other states, but also suggestive evidence that some already-present migrants leave the country entirely." A 2019 analysis by the Cato Institute, which supports increased immigration, found that while E-Verify used to be effective at spotting illegal immigrants, it was no longer so. The analysis estimated that the system only spotted the hiring of 16.1 percent of illegal immigrant workers in the fiscal year of 2018.

== Mandated use ==
=== Federal government ===
As of September 2007, most of the federal government did not use the system when hiring employees, but an Office of Management and Budget directive mandates that all federal government agencies sign up to use E-Verify by October 1, 2007.

Social Security Administration failed to perform required verifications of the Social Security numbers of 19 percent of its own new hires during an 18-month period, according to a January 2010 report from the agency's inspector general.

=== Federal contractors ===
As of September 8, 2009, employers with federal contracts or subcontracts that contain the Federal Acquisition Regulation (FAR) E-Verify clause are required to use E-Verify to determine the employment eligibility of 1) Employees performing direct, substantial work under those federal contracts and 2) New hires organization-wide, regardless of whether they are working on a federal contract. A federal contractor or subcontractor who has a contract with the FAR E-Verify clause also has the option to verify the company's entire workforce.

=== OPT extension for students ===
In April 2008, the U.S. government extended the duration of post-completion work authorization, known as "Optional Practical Training" (OPT), from 12 months to an additional 24 months. This change allows for a total of 36 months of work authorization through the various OPT authorizations granted by USCIS for certain qualifying students who have completed U.S. degrees in Science, Technology, Engineering, and Mathematics (STEM).

Students are eligible for this extension only if their employer participates in the E-Verify program. If an employer does not participate in E-Verify, students working for those employers are limited to 12 months of OPT and cannot receive the 24-month extension, even if they otherwise qualify for it.

== State laws ==
There are a number of state laws requiring or limiting the use of E-Verify for employers. According to a 2012 survey by the Center for Immigration Studies, 16 states require use of E-Verify in some form. The survey found that six states have laws requiring all or nearly all businesses to use E-Verify to determine employment eligibility: Arizona, Mississippi, South Carolina, Alabama, Georgia, and North Carolina. Five states require use of E-Verify by public employers and all or most public contractors: Indiana, Nebraska, Oklahoma, Virginia, and Missouri. Three states require only public contractors to use E-Verify: Louisiana, Minnesota, and Pennsylvania. Idaho only requires public employers to use E-Verify, while Florida only requires it for agencies under direction of the governor. Colorado and Utah encourage use of E-Verify, but allow for alternative means of employment verification. An E-Verify-only mandate in Utah is contingent on the state's effort to create a state-level guestworker program. The survey also found that some states have moved in the opposite direction, limiting or discouraging use of E-Verify: California, Rhode Island, and Illinois.

In 2011, the Supreme Court of the U.S. rejected a suit arguing that Arizona's state law, which can cause employers found failing to use E-Verify to lose their state business licenses, was pre-empted by federal law. The ruling effectively confirmed that states may mandate the use of E-Verify.

As of January 1, 2023, the following states require E-Verify for some or all employers: Alabama, Arizona, Colorado, Florida, Georgia, Idaho, Indiana, Louisiana, Michigan, Minnesota, Mississippi, Missouri, Nebraska, North Carolina, Oklahoma, Pennsylvania, South Carolina, Tennessee, Texas, Utah, Virginia and West Virginia.

=== Alabama ===
The state of Alabama passed a law mandating employers to use E-Verify on new hires. The "Beason-Hammon Alabama Taxpayer and Citizen Protection Act" (H.B. 56) was signed into law on June 9, 2011. The act makes it illegal for any business entity, employer, or public employer to "knowingly employ, hire for employment, or continue to employ" an undocumented immigrant to perform work within the state. Effective April 1, 2012, every employer in Alabama must enroll in E-Verify and use the program to check employment authorization. The act creates an incentive for using E-Verify as businesses and subcontractors that enroll in E-Verify are immune from liability for employing an undocumented immigrant. The act requires the Alabama Department of Homeland Security (DHS) to establish and maintain an E-Verify employer service for any employer in the state with 25 or fewer employees that wants assistance. The Alabama DHS will enroll a participating business in E-Verify on its behalf at no cost. This law is applied to businesses both inside and outside Alabama that do business with the state.

=== Arizona ===
The state of Arizona requires employers to participate in E-Verify: the Legal Arizona Workers Act has survived a number of constitutional challenges, up to and including the US Supreme Court and is currently in effect. The Legal Arizona Workers Act requires all Arizona employers to use E-Verify with all newly hired employees, effective January 1, 2008. As of December 2008, 5.6 percent of Arizona businesses had signed up with E-Verify.

As amended, the law prohibits employers from intentionally and/or knowingly hiring illegal immigrants (or a person who employs or contracts with an illegal immigrant) and requires all employers to use E-Verify during the employment process and keep a record of the verification for the duration of the employee's employment or at least three years, whichever is longer. Additional legislation prohibits the state government from entering into a contract with any contractor or subcontractor that fails to use E-Verify. According to USCIS, there are 39,191 employers in Arizona using E-Verify at 84,703 hiring sites.

=== California ===
In 2011, California passed an act to prohibit municipalities from mandating use of E-Verify. At least 20 municipalities had required use of E-Verify, for all businesses and/or companies doing business with the local government, including Mission Viejo (2007), Temecula (ordinance 5.06.030) (2010), Murrieta (ordinance Chapter 5.04) (2010), Riverside, Santa Maria (only for city employees), Lake Elsinore (Ordinance No. 1279) (2010), Wildomar (only for contractors) (2010), Lancaster (Ordinance No. 934), Palmdale, San Clemente, Escondido, Menifee, Hemet, San Juan Capistrano, Hesperia, Norco, San Bernardino County, Rancho Santa Margarita, and Simi Valley.

Cities considering E-Verify ordinances for businesses for 2011 are Costa Mesa, San Luis Obispo, Santa Maria (for all businesses) Santa Barbara, and San Jose. However, Costa Mesa is the only city that has adapted the same state law as Arizona's SB-1070, allowing the City to arrest those without proper identification of resident status under suspicion of being unlawfully present in the United States.

=== Colorado ===
Colorado's E-Verify law became effective on August 7, 2006, and was amended on May 13, 2008, (H.B. 06-1343, amended by H.B. 07-1073 and S.B. 08-193). The amendment created the "Department Program" and is offered as an alternative to E-Verify, meaning that E-Verify is not mandated in Colorado. Public contractors must participate in either E-Verify or the Department Program. The state's Department of Labor and Employment is tasked with investigating complaints and can conduct on-site inspections and random audits of state agencies. It has the authority to request and review citizenship documentation of persons performing work on public contracts. Under the "Department Program" public contractors must consent to random audits to assess compliance with the law.

=== Florida ===
On January 4, 2011, Governor Rick Scott signed an executive order requiring agencies under his direction to use E-Verify. It was superseded on May 27, 2011, with a similar E-Verify order that brought the policy more in line with standard E-Verify practices by requiring verification of new employees rather than both new and existing employees. Specifically, all agencies under the direction of the governor have been directed to verify the employment eligibility of all new employees through E-Verify. Agencies not under the direction of the governor are "encouraged" to follow the same guidelines. All agencies under the direction of the governor must expressly require contractors to use E-Verify for all new employees hired by the contractor during the contract term as a condition of all contracts for the provision of goods and services to the state in excess of nominal value. Additionally, subcontractors performing work pursuant to the contract must use E-Verify. Agencies not under the direction of the governor are encouraged to follow these guidelines as well.

Florida was the second state to join the E-Verify RIDE program, which allows employers to view State ID and driver's license photos during the verification process.

On June 30, 2020, Governor Ron DeSantis signed a bill requiring government employers and private companies that contract with the government to use E-Verify.

On May 10, 2023, Ron DeSantis signed Senate Bill 1718 that required all employers, both public and private with 25 or more employees, to use E-Verify. The law goes into effect on July 1, 2023.

=== Georgia ===
Georgia requires both public and private employers to use E-Verify during the hiring process. In 2006 the state passed the "Georgia Security and Immigration Compliance Act" (S.B. 529), which applied to public employers, contractors, and subcontractors and was followed by a number of amendments. In 2011, the state passed the "Illegal Immigration Reform and Enforcement Act of 2011" (H.B. 87), which extends required use of E-Verify to private employers.

As of July 1, 2007, all public employers in Georgia were required to use E-Verify for all new employees. With additional amendments, the law now requires all public employees to permanently post the employer's federally issued user identification number and date of authorization on the employer's website. If the public employer does not have a website, then the local government is directed to submit the relevant information to the Carl Vinson Institute of Government of the University of Georgia to be posted by the institute on the website created for local government audit and budget reporting.

An official at the state's Department of Labor told the Center for Immigration Studies that funding has not been made available for the auditing process rendering the law largely ineffective.

=== Idaho ===
On May 29, 2009, Gov. Butch Otter signed Executive Order 2009–10, mandating, among other things, that state agencies verify that new employees are eligible for employment under federal and state law. While the order does not specifically reference E-Verify, subsequent internal guidelines resulted in all state agencies using E-Verify to meet the order's requirements. The order came into effect on July 1, 2009.

Public contractors and subcontractors are required to declare to the contracting state agency that they have "substantiated that all employees providing services or involved in any way on projects funded directly by or assisted in whole or part by state funds or federal stimulus dollars" are legally authorized to work in the United States. According to an official at the state's Department of Human Resources, public contractors are encouraged, but not required to use E-Verify to meet this requirement.

On July 14, 2013, Idaho joined the E-verify RIDE program, which allows employers to view State ID and driver's license photos during the verification process.

=== Illinois ===
As a rule, E-Verify is not required in Illinois. Illinois is also the only state that has tried to block the use of E-Verify by private employers.

Section 12(a) of the Illinois Right to Privacy in the Workplace Act prohibited Illinois employers from using E-verify to verify the work authorization of their employees. The United States Department of Homeland Security sued to prevent the law from taking effect as scheduled on January 1, 2008. On March 12, 2009, agreeing with the federal government, the U.S. District Court for the Central District of Illinois ruled that Illinois' law is invalid under the Supremacy Clause to the U.S. Constitution because it conflicts with the federal Illegal Immigration Reform and Immigrant Responsibility Act (IIRIRA). The case was United States v. Illinois, (No. 07-3261, C.D. Ill., 2009).

Under the new law, which amends the Illinois Right to Privacy in the Workplace Act, Illinois employers are required to sign a sworn attestation either upon initial enrollment in E-Verify, or by January 31, 2010, if they are already enrolled in the program. The attestation form affirms that the employer has received the requisite E-Verify training materials from the U.S. Department of Homeland Security ("DHS"), and that all employees with access to the company's E-Verify account have completed mandatory online E-Verify tutorials. It further states that the employer has posted the required legal notices regarding its enrollment in E-Verify and certain non-discrimination procedures. The employer must retain the signed original attestation and proof of its employees' E-Verify training.

=== Indiana ===
On July 1, 2011, Indiana enacted S.B. 590. Among other things, the law requires state agencies and political subdivisions to use E-Verify to determine work authorization status of all employees hired after June 30, 2011. The requirement to use E-Verify also applies to public contractors. The law does not contain any enforcement provisions or any auditing process to determine employer compliance.

=== Louisiana ===
On August 15, 2011, two pieces of E-Verify legislation were approved in Louisiana. The first bill, H.B. 342, requires all state and local contractors who seek to do business with Louisiana to use E-Verify. The second bill, H.B. 646, encourages all private businesses to verify the legal status of their new hires by providing employers a safe harbor against sanctions if they use E-Verify or another method for determining worker eligibility.

=== Minnesota ===
On January 7, 2008, then-Governor Tim Pawlenty signed Executive Order 08-01, requiring use of E-Verify for the state's executive branch employees and for some public contracts. Gov. Mark Dayton allowed the order to lapse in April 2011. A new E-Verify provision requires use of E-Verify only for some public contracts. It requires state contracts for services in excess of $50,000 to require certification from vendors and subcontractors that they have implemented or are in the process of implementing the E-Verify program for all newly hired employees who will perform work under the contract. It exempts contracts entered into by the State Board of Investment.

=== Mississippi ===
The Mississippi Employment Protection Act requires all Mississippi employers to use E-Verify with new hires. Mississippi employers with 250 or more employees must comply with the law as of July 1, 2008. The law goes into effect for employers with 100 to 249 employees as of July 1, 2009. Employers with 30 to 99 employees must comply by July 1, 2010. The law is effective for employers with fewer than 30 employees on July 1, 2011. As of June 2011, a total of 4,336 employers representing more than 9,000 worksites in Mississippi were using E-Verify.

Enforcement of the law, and its effectiveness, remains a significant problem. An official at the Mississippi Attorney General's office explained to the Center for Immigration Studies that his office is tasked with investigating complaints that the public may file about potential violations of the law. However, when asked how often such complaints are filed, he responded, "Rarely." This is consistent with information from a two-day immigration hearing held at the state capital in 2010. Then, a different spokesperson for the Attorney General's office explained that the office had received no formal complaints. A state representative told the Center for Immigration Studies that because the state law grants authority over E-Verify regulation to multiple state agencies, no agency has taken the lead and enforcement has been nominal.

Mississippi was the first state to use USCIS's RIDE program as part of its E-Verify efforts; as of July 2017, ten states participated (Arizona, Florida, Idaho, Iowa, Maryland, Mississippi, Nebraska, North Dakota, Wisconsin and Wyoming). On June 13, 2011, in an effort to improve E-Verify's accuracy in Mississippi, Immigration and Customs Enforcement (ICE) launched the "Records and Information from DMVs for E-Verify" (RIDE) program in the state. The RIDE program compares driver's licenses or other government-issued ID cards against data held by the state's motor vehicle agency.

=== Missouri ===
On July 7, 2008, Missouri's E-Verify bill (H.R. 1549) was signed into law. It became effective on January 1, 2009. The law prohibits businesses from knowingly employing, hiring, or continuing to employ an illegal immigrant to perform work within the state of Missouri. The E-Verify portion of the law does not apply to all businesses, but those businesses that do use E-Verify are provided an affirmative defense that the business has not violated the provisions of the law that prohibit the employment of illegal immigrant. All public employers are required to "actively participate" in E-Verify.

=== Nebraska ===
On April 8, 2009, Nebraska's L.B. 403 was signed into law. The law requires use of E-Verify by state agencies (and political subdivisions) and by public contractors starting October 1, 2009. Every contract between a public employer and public contractor must contain a provision requiring the public contractor to use E-Verify for new employees physically performing services within Nebraska. The requirement does not apply to public contracts made prior to the operative date of this act. According to state surveys, use of E-Verify appears to be low.

=== North Carolina ===
The North Carolina governor signed H.B. 36 into law on June 23, 2011. All counties and municipalities were required to begin using E-Verify by October 1, 2011. The law also requires private businesses to use E-Verify for new employees, but exempts any "seasonal temporary employee who is employed for 90 or fewer days during a 12-consecutive-month period". Employers with 500 or more employees must be using E-Verify by October 1, 2012; employers with 100 to 499 employees must be using E-Verify by January 1, 2013; and employers with 25 to 99 employees must be using E-Verify by July 1, 2013. The law does not include a random audit process for determining employer compliance.

=== Oklahoma ===
The "Oklahoma Taxpayer and Citizen Protection Act of 2007" (H.B. 1804) was signed into law on May 9, 2007. Among other things, the law requires public contractors and subcontractors to use E-Verify (or a third-party program with an equal or higher degree of reliability, should one appear). After July 1, 2008, public employers were prohibited from entering into contracts for the physical performance of services within Oklahoma unless the contractor (and any subcontractor) uses E-Verify to verify the work authorization of all new employees. If an independent contractor, contracting for the physical performance of services in Oklahoma, fails to provide to the contracting entity documentation to verify the independent contractor's employment authorization, the contracting entity is required to withhold state income tax at the top marginal income tax rate as provided under state law.

=== Pennsylvania ===
On July 5, 2012, Pennsylvania Governor Tom Corbett signed "Public Works Employment Verification Act" (S.B. 637). It requires some public works contractors and subcontractors to use E-Verify to determine employment eligibility of all new hires. In order to ensure compliance, employers are subject to complaint-based and random audits. The act takes effect January 1, 2013. Under the act, "public work" means "construction, reconstruction, demolition, alteration, and/or repair work other than maintenance work, done under contract and paid for in whole or in part out of the funds of a public body" where the estimated cost of the total project is in excess of $25,000 but does not include work performed under a "rehabilitation or manpower training program."

The legislation was approved by both houses of the state legislature and aims to ensure that all construction jobs funded by taxpayers employ only documented workers by checking employees' information against government records.

=== Rhode Island ===
In March 2008, Governor Carcieri issued an executive order requiring executive agencies to use E-Verify; and for all persons and businesses, including grantees, contractors and their subcontractors and vendors to use E-Verify.

On January 5, 2011, less than 24 hours after his swearing-in, Gov. Lincoln Chafee rescinded Executive Order 08-01, calling it "an agent of divisiveness, incivility, and distrust among the state's citizens." In defending his move, Gov. Chafee incorrectly claimed on at least two occasions that Rhode Island was one of only six states with an E-Verify mandate.

=== South Carolina ===
The "South Carolina Illegal Immigration Reform Act" (H. 4400) was signed into law on June 4, 2008, and amended on June 27, 2011, (S. 20). The law requires all employers to use E-Verify. The original version of the law gave employers the option of confirming the eligibility of new employees through either E-Verify or by checking the validity of driver's licenses and other identification cards. The 2011 amendment made E-Verify the exclusive method for confirming employment eligibility. South Carolina is said to have one of the nation's most effective E-Verify laws in that the state uses an audit process to ensure businesses are in compliance with the law.

South Carolina conducted approximately 6,000 audits of businesses under the 2008 version of the law. During the first year – July 1, 2009, through June 30, 2010, when the law applied to businesses with 100 or more employees (a total of 2,300 employers) — South Carolina conducted approximately 1,900 audits. The second year, when the law applied to every employer, the state conducted audits of approximately 4,200 businesses.

Every public employer must register and participate in "federal work authorization program to verify the employment authorization of all new employees." See SC Code Section 8-14-20(A). Public employer must also require public contractors and subcontractors to agree to use e-verify or "to employ only workers who" possess or qualify to obtain a SC drivers license or identification card. See SC Code Section 8-14-20(B). The latter requirement applies as follows: "(1) on and after 1 January 2009, with respect to contractors, subcontractors, or sub-subcontractors of five hundred or more employees; (2) on and after 1 July 2009, with respect to contractors, subcontractors, or sub-subcontractors of one hundred or more employees but less than five hundred employees; and (3) on and after 1 January 2010, with respect to all other contractors, subcontractors, or sub-subcontractors." See SC Code Section 8-14-20(D).

SC Code Section 41-8-20 requires that "(A) All private employers in South Carolina shall be imputed a South Carolina employment license, which permits a private employer to employ a person in this State. A private employer may not employ a person unless the private employer's South Carolina employment license and any other applicable licenses as defined in Section 41-8-10 are in effect and are not suspended or revoked. A private employer's employment license shall remain in effect provided the private employer complies with the provisions of this chapter. (B) All private employers who are required by federal law to complete and maintain federal employment eligibility verification forms or documents must register and participate in the E-Verify federal work authorization program, or its successor, to verify the work authorization of every new employee within three business days after employing a new employee. A private employer who does not comply with the requirements of this subsection violates the private employer's licenses. (C) The South Carolina Department of Employment and Workforce shall provide private employers with technical advice and electronic access to the E-Verify federal work authorization program's website for the sole purpose of registering and participating in the program. (D) Private employers shall employ provisionally a new employee until the new employee's work authorization has been verified pursuant to this section. A private employer shall submit a new employee's name and information for verification even if the new employee's employment is terminated less than three business days after becoming employed. If a new employee's work authorization is not verified by the federal work authorization program, a private employer must not employ, continue to employ, or reemploy the new employee. (E) To assist private employers in understanding the requirements of this chapter, the director shall send written notice of the requirements of this section to all South Carolina employers, and shall publish the information contained in the notice on its website. Nothing in this section shall create a legal requirement that any private employer receive actual notice of the requirements of this chapter through written notice from the director, nor create any legal defense for failure to receive notice. (F) If a private employer is a contractor, the private employer shall maintain the contact phone numbers of all subcontractors and sub-subcontractors performing services for the private employer. The private employer shall provide the contact phone numbers or a contact phone number, as applicable, to the director pursuant to an audit or investigation within seventy-two hours of the director's request. HISTORY: 2008 Act No. 280, Section 19, eff June 4, 2008; 2011 Act No. 69, Section 9, eff January 1, 2012."

=== Tennessee ===
The Tennessee Lawful Employment Act (HB 1378) was signed into law by Governor Bill Haslam in June 2011. Effective January 1, 2017, private employers with 50 or more employees under the same FEIN are required to use the federal E-Verify employment verification process. This applies to employees working in or outside the state of Tennessee. Private employers with fewer than 50 employees may choose to use E-Verify for newly hired employees or request and maintain documents under the TLEA’s list of authorized identity and employment eligibility documents. The TLEA covers "non-employees" as well, while not employed directly, are paid directly by the employer for labor or services. Companies in Tennessee are required to request and maintain copies of certain identity and work authorization documents for non-employees, unless an exception applies (i.e. workers are employed by a separate company). Effective January 1, 2023, the Tennessee Lawful Employment Act was amended to reduce the minimum number of employees from 50 to 35. Under the new amendment, private employers with less than 35 employees may still choose to enroll in E-Verify or request and maintain documents under the TLEA's list of authorized identity and employment eligibility documents.

=== Texas ===
In December 2014, Governor Rick Perry issued Executive Order RP 80, which requires all state agencies to verify employment eligibility of all current and future employees through the E-Verify system. It also requires that state contractors use E-Verify for all persons employed to perform duties within Texas, and for sub-contractors as well.

=== Utah ===
The "Private Employer Verification Act" (S.B. 251) was signed into law on March 31, 2010. It requires all private employers who employ more than 15 or more employees as of July 1, 2010, to use a "status verification system" to verify the employment eligibility of new employees, though it does not mandate use of E-Verify. As an alternative to E-Verify, businesses can use any other federal program the state deems equivalent to E-Verify, including "the Social Security Number Verification Service or similar online verification process implemented by the United States Social Security Administration." (Note: However, the E-Verify is considered to be more reliable than the mere verification through a Social Security Administration database that the social security number, name of employee, and date of birth all match.) The law exempts employers of aliens on H-2A (temporary agricultural) and H-2B (temporary, non-agricultural) visas. An official at the Social Security Administration told the Center for Immigration Studies that the program is not sufficient for determining immigration status.

=== Virginia ===
On April 11, 2010, Virginia's H.B. 737 was signed into law. In early 2011, Gov. Robert McDonnell announced that he would push up the deadline by 18 months to June 1, 2011. The state's E-Verify policy requires both state agencies and businesses contracting with Virginia to use E-Verify, the result of two pieces of legislation. On March 25, 2011, an E-Verify bill aimed at public contractors was signed into law: H.B. 1859. Effective December 1, 2013, employers with more than an average of 50 employees for the previous 12 months entering into a work or service contract in excess of $50,000 with any state agency must register and participate in E-Verify. Failure to comply with the law results in the employer being debarred from contracting with any state agency for a period up to one year. Such debarment ends upon the employer's registration and participation in E-Verify.

== Criticism ==
As of May 2023, the U.S. government reports that E-Verify has been used in 48,042,413 cases, resulting in 738,507 mismatches. Only 0.011% of all cases were mismatches that were contested but not eventually confirmed. Pro-immigration critics cite 52,280 initial mismatches in the first 34,853,666 cases as of 2017 as an unacceptably high rate (0.15%). Since then, fewer than 5,000 additional erroneous mismatches were identified among 13 million more cases, an error rate of 0.04%.

In 2012, "the overall accuracy of E-Verify for employment-authorized workers, as measured by the FNC (Final Nonconfirmations) accuracy rate, was approximately 94 percent.". However, the margin of error, currently around 8%, is decreasing, as many of the errors came from changing last names after marriage or not informing the government of changes in citizenship status. As of 2018, 98.88% of E-Verify applicants were approved to work.

Chris Calabrese of the American Civil Liberties Union opposes E-Verify, citing concerns that it could expand into an onerous national ID system: "Employers are not police officers, except in this one context where we suddenly want them to be law enforcement agents who are going to police their workforce." Federal law already requires employers to collect identification showing an employee is eligible to work, and to file an I-9 Employment Eligibility Verification form.

The American Farm Bureau Federation opposes E-Verify and stated in July 2011 that it "could have a significant, negative impact on U.S. farm production, not only threatening the livelihoods of many farmers and ranchers in labor-intensive agriculture but jeopardizing as well the health of the rural economy, where agriculture plays an important role."

Reason magazine reported in May 2023 of the disapproval of E-Verify by some Republican Congressmen such as Thomas Massie. Massie opposes E-Verify on the grounds that he believes that the bill could be used as a form of invasion of privacy against all American citizens as opposed to its supposed use to mainly target immigrants, akin to a "Patriot Act 2.0." Massie was quoted saying over a tweet, "National E-verify bill contains vague references to two pilot programs of non-photographic technology you must use to prove your identity to DHS in order to get a job. What is it? Fingerprints? DNA? Retina? Why not just say it in the bill? Is E-Verify actually Patriot Act 2.0?"

In August 2025, the U.S. Department of Homeland Security said that it is "reckless" for an employer to rely on E-Verify to determine whether a person is legally allowed to work in the U.S.

== See also ==
- Systematic Alien Verification for Entitlements
- Immigration to the United States
