= Class (Rosenfeld novel) =

Book by Lucinda Rosenfeld

- First edition
- Author: Lucinda Rosenfeld
- Publisher: Little, Brown
- Publication date: 2017

Class is a 2017 novel by American author Lucinda Rosenfeld. It is set in the New York City borough of Brooklyn.

== Critical reception ==
The novel was included on the list published by the Philadelphia Inquirer of the best books of 2017.
