= Political positions of Rudy Giuliani =

Remarks and positions of politician Rudy Giuliani

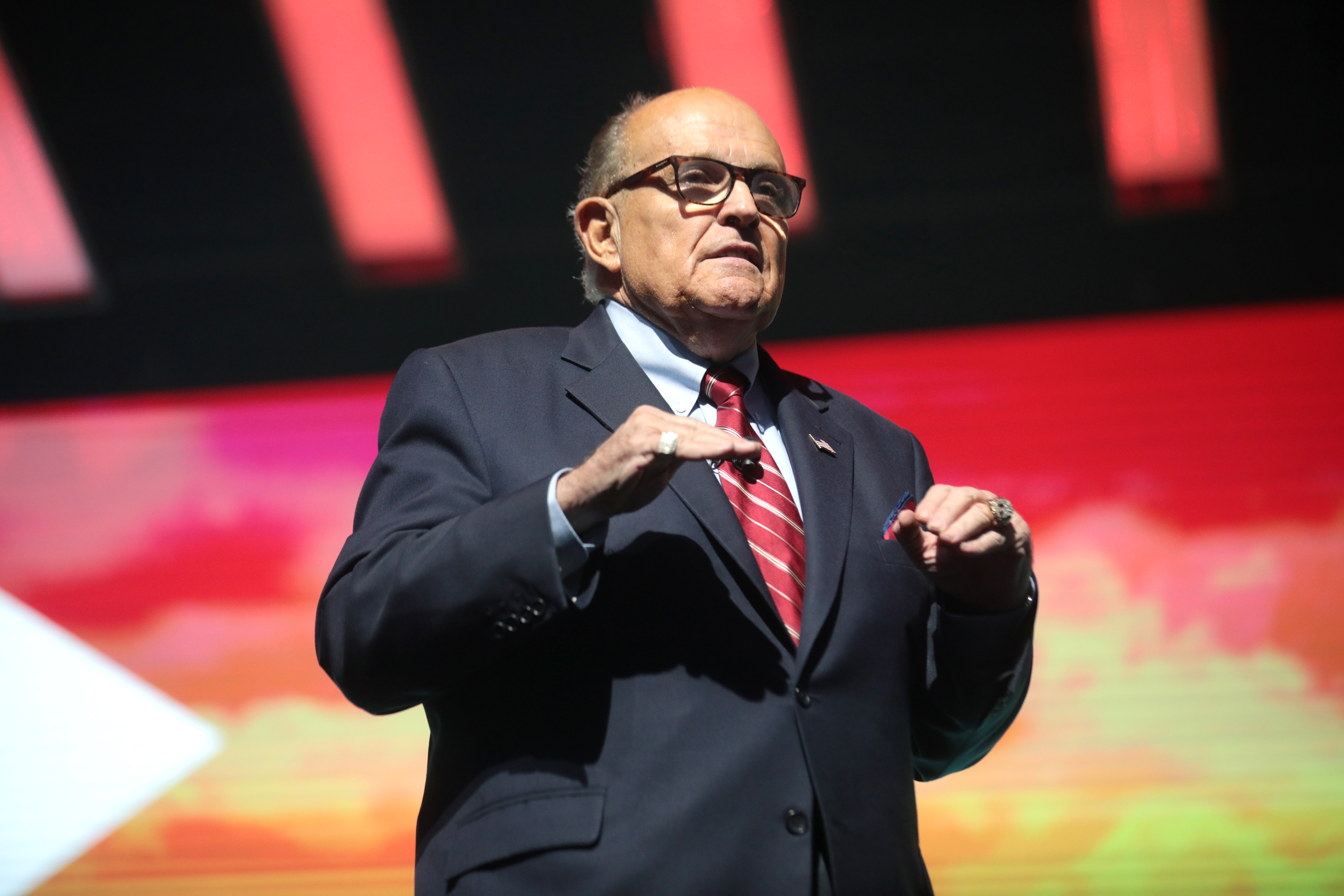
Giuliani speaking at the 2019 Student Action Summit in West Palm Beach, Florida

Below are remarks and positions of Rudy Giuliani, former candidate for the Republican nomination for President of the United States. Mayor Giuliani has described himself as a moderate Republican.

An August 2006 poll from Rasmussen Reports showed that the American public perceives Giuliani overall to be a moderate. Specifically, of those Americans polled, 36% classified him as a moderate, 29% as a conservative, and 15% as a liberal, with the remaining 20% being unsure. On The Issues, a non-partisan organization that records politicians' stances, considers Giuliani to be a "Libertarian Conservative."

Giuliani was originally a Democrat, and supported both John F. Kennedy and George McGovern in their presidential bids. He switched to the Republican Party in 1980 after a five-year stint as an independent.

Conservative political pundit George Will wrote that at the end of Giuliani's time as mayor he had run the most conservative government in America in the last 50 or 60 years.

== Economic policy ==
=== Taxation ===
Giuliani has said that he cut taxes 23 times as mayor of New York City. However, the city's Independent Budget Office has pointed out that seven of these tax cuts were state initiatives, and that Giuliani had actually opposed the largest cut which was due to come with the expiration of a 12½-percent surcharge on the city's personal income tax. Giuliani supported President Bush's tax cuts.

In 1994, he endorsed Democratic incumbent Governor Mario Cuomo over Republican challenger George Pataki due to Pataki's proposals to cut the commuter tax. Giuliani also objected to Pataki's plan to cut income taxes by 25%. The commuter tax was a 0.45% tax paid by those who lived outside NYC but who commuted to jobs within it. Giuliani was strictly against cutting this tax, calling it "relatively modest and completely justified."

Giuliani has not signed a pledge by Americans for Tax Reform (signed by every Republican presidential nominee since 1988) to not raise taxes while in office.

In 1996, Giuliani criticized a proposal by presidential candidate Steve Forbes for a national flat tax, saying its elimination of deductions for state and local income taxes would unfairly punish high-tax states such as New York and added that the flat tax "would really be a disaster."

By 2007, Giuliani was more amenable to a flat tax, but still claimed difficulties in adopting one. In an interview, he said: "If we were doing income tax for the first time. In other words, if we were starting off new back at the beginning of the last century, then probably we should go with a – we probably should've gone with a flat tax, maybe two levels of tax, but really simple. Our economy has kind of grown up now on depreciation and deductions and industries have grown up around that and so I don't know exactly how much you can simplify it, but you sure have to make a stab at it." Later that week, in accepting Forbes' endorsement of his own presidential candidacy, Giuliani said that "a flat tax would make a lot of sense".

During the May 3, 2007, Republican Presidential debate when asked what tax would he like to cut, Giuliani responded:

We have to adjust the AMT. That has to be reduced. We have to get rid of the death tax, which is going to go to zero in 2010, which is going to create an incentive – I can't imagine what kind of an incentive it's going to create. It's going to go to zero in 2010. And then in 2011, it's going to go to 55 percent. And we have to make sure that the tax cuts that went into effect, that that level remains. Otherwise, we're going to have one of the biggest tax increases in history in 2011. And I would look to try to regularize the rates and look for some marginal reduction, even beyond what we're doing right now.

With regard to Social Security, Giuliani has expressed his opposition to a tax increase but has declined to rule it out.

=== Health care ===
In 2000 Giuliani initiated what the New York Post called "a massive program" to get city employees to expand the number of low-income, uninsured children and adults into public health entitlement programs such as Medicaid, Child Health Plus and Family Health Plan. Promoting enrollment in his HealthStat program, Giuliani said at the time that the program could be "a model for the rest of this country for how to get people covered on the available health programs."

On February 26, 2007, Giuliani said that he was against any notion of universal health care in America, which would mean a "socialization" of American medicine. "That would be a terrible, terrible mistake. [Solutions] have to be free market solutions. They have to be a competitive system." Giuliani did say that it is an appropriate role for the government to "find ways" to expand access to health insurance.

On July 29, 2007, Giuliani announced his five key health care advisors: Daniel P. Kessler, Scott W. Atlas, David G. Gratzer, Sally C. Pipes, and Donald W. Moran.

On July 31, 2007, Giuliani unveiled his health care plan which proposed a tax deduction (not a tax credit) of up to $15,000 for families and up to $7,500 for individuals who purchase private individual health insurance policies.

Giuliani wrote an August 3, 2007 article for The Boston Globe on his official position on health care. In it he stated that taxes should not be raised to provide more health care but instead lowered for "individual empowerment". He talked about the creation of a tax-free Health Savings Account that would allow individuals and small businesses to stock up on health insurance and in effect lower rates.

"America is best when we solve our problems from our strengths, not our weaknesses. Healthcare reform must be based on increased choice, affordability, portability, and individual empowerment." (Giuliani)

In October 2007, he supported President Bush's veto of the augmented State Children's Health Insurance Program. Giuliani's support of the S-CHIP veto elicited criticism from his past supporters on health issues: Sandy Trujillo, deputy director of the Children's Defense Fund said, "I'm quite shocked because Giuliani was a champion of the Children's Health Insurance Program. He's re-writing his own history."

=== Government spending ===
==== Stadiums ====
Giuliani was a supporter of public financing for sports stadiums and arenas as mayor of New York, including $194 million in the budget for sports arenas for 2001. Days before leaving office in December 2001, he announced "tentative agreements" for both the New York Yankees and New York Mets to build a $1 billion stadium. Of $1.6 billion sought for the stadiums, city and state expenditure would pick up half the tab for construction, $800 million, along with $390 million on extra transportation. The plan also called for forgiving $80,000 that the Mets owed the city in cable revenues and giving both teams an additional $25 million in planning money. The plan also said that the teams would be allowed to keep all parking revenues, which state officials had already said they wanted to keep to compensate the state for building new garages for the teams. The teams would keep 96% of ticket revenues and 100% of all other revenues, not pay sales tax or property tax on the stadiums, and would get low-cost electricity from New York state.

During his eight years as mayor, Giuliani was a constant advocate of publicly funded stadiums. Giuliani had already been instrumental in the construction of taxpayer-funded minor league baseball facilities KeySpan Park for the Mets' minor league Brooklyn Cyclones and Richmond County Bank Ballpark for the Staten Island Yankees. The dual $1 billion plans had also been put forth unsuccessfully by Giuliani in 1996. Giuliani faced questions about how to finance these stadiums, while the city struggled to balance the budget. Recently built stadiums in Baltimore and Cleveland had cost one-third to one-fourth the $1 billion set aside for the proposed New York stadiums; the $1 billion stadiums were to be the most expensive in American history. His 1998 plan to relocate the Yankees to the west side of Manhattan had been met with strong opposition; at that time, $3 million in city money was given to the Yankees for site planning. Six city officials were sent on a city trip to explore stadiums in Baltimore, Denver and other cities.

== Foreign policy ==
In September 2007, the influential journal Foreign Affairs published a major exposition of Giuliani's views on foreign policy.

=== Iran ===
Giuliani believes that the leaders of Iran have objectives that are similar to those of al-Qaeda. In a New York Times interview he said, "[al-Qaeda's] movement has already displayed more aggressive tendencies by coming here and killing us," and asserted that Iran has "a similar objective in their anger at the modern world".

In his Foreign Affairs article, Giuliani stated that he regards the Islamic Republic of Iran as a nation which "has been determined to attack the international system throughout its entire existence" and has "supported terrorism and murder". He accused the Iranian government of "hiding behind the principle of sovereignty to stave off the consequences of its actions". Consequently, he feels that talks with Iran should only be approached from a position of strength. In his view:

"The theocrats ruling Iran need to understand that we can wield the stick as well as the carrot, by undermining popular support for their regime, damaging the Iranian economy, weakening Iran's military, and, should all else fail, destroying its nuclear infrastructure."

During the May 3, 2007, Republican Presidential debate, Giuliani said:

He [Ahmadinejad] has to understand it's not an option; he cannot have nuclear weapons.

In the following June 5, 2007 debate, in answer to a hypothetical question about whether the use of U.S. tactical nuclear weapons should be considered to keep Iran from gaining its own nuclear weapons, Giuliani said that "I think it could be done with conventional weapons, but you can't rule out anything and you shouldn't take any option off the table."

In September 2007, Giuliani stated that the United States and allies would do everything necessary to prevent Iran from going nuclear stating the "absolute assurance that we will – if they get to the point where they are going to become a nuclear power – we will prevent them or we'll set them back five or 10 years. And that is not said as a threat. That should be said as a promise."

=== War in Afghanistan ===
Giuliani is a supporter of the War in Afghanistan considering that the war was a response to the September 11 attacks and opposes any time table for U.S. troop withdrawal from Afghanistan.

=== Iraq War ===
Giuliani was a supporter of the Iraq War, later in 2007 Giuliani was described by Newsweek magazine in January 2007 as "one of the most consistent cheerleaders for the president's handling of the war in Iraq." Later that year he also supported Bush's surge in the number of U.S. troops in Iraq.

=== Domestic surveillance ===
Giuliani has supported Bush's tactic of using domestic surveillance. He stated that "... we have to remain a country that has the Patriot Act, a country that has electronic surveillance to use to find out about these plots that may be being planned."

=== Israel ===
Giuliani has been considered one of the most Pro-Israel figures in American politics. A project created by Haaretz, rated Giuliani as the best candidate for Israel. Giuliani urged NATO to admit Israel, as well as several other nations to help combat terrorism.

=== Waterboarding and interrogation methods ===
Giuliani has supported "waterboarding" in a situation where "we know that there's going to be another attack and these people (terrorists) know about it." He also has stated that defining sleep deprivation as torture is "silly." In regards to interrogating terrorists to prevent attack, Giuliani said that he "would tell the people who had to do the interrogation to use every method they could think of. It shouldn't be torture, but every method they can think of."

=== United Nations ===
In an October 1, 2001 speech before the United Nations in New York, Mayor Giuliani said that in order for the United Nations to remain relevant, it had to unequivocally oppose terrorism, and now: "The United Nations must hold accountable any country that supports or condones terrorism. Otherwise, you will fail in your primary mission as peacekeeper. It must ostracize any nation that supports terrorism. It must isolate any nation that remains neutral in the fight against terrorism."

== Global warming ==
Giuliani believes that "human beings are contributing to" global warming. In a December 2007 interview with CBS News anchor Katie Couric, he suggested that part of the solution to potential anthropogenic forcing of global warming – whilst still maintaining energy security – is an increased reliance on coal-burning power plants, combined with the development and deployment of technologies such as "clean coal" and carbon dioxide geosequestration which could help to make coal less environmentally intensive, and also on nuclear power:

I think the best answer to it is energy independence. We've got more coal reserves in the U.S. than they have oil reserves in Saudi Arabia. If we find a way to deal with it and use it so it doesn't hurt the environment, we're going to find ourselves not contributing to global warming ... I think we have to take another look at nuclear power. // We haven't had a licensed nuclear power plant in 30 years. It has to be done carefully. But we haven't lost a life to nuclear power yet.

Giuliani did not address the fact that coal-generated electricity produces more carbon dioxide than other fossil fuels, and was not asked what specific measures could be taken to reduce the environmental impacts of coal. His Texas-based law firm, Bracewell & Giuliani, is a major lobbyist on behalf of coal-fired power plants and the fossil fuel industry.

== Social policy ==
Giuliani has a history of taking positions and making statements that are liberal in aspects of social policy, particularly as relating to abortion, gay and lesbian rights, gun control, illegal immigration and school prayer. During the 2008 presidential campaign he has sought to present a more conservative image vis-a-vis abortion, gun rights and illegal immigration. He remains hawkish on the war on drugs, and opposes the medicinal use of marijuana.

=== Abortion ===
Giuliani expressed pro-choice positions during his campaigns for mayor of New York City, (1989 and 1993), a seat in the United States Senate (2000) and in his 2008 presidential run. However, in 2022, he announced his opposition to Roe v. Wade and supported overturning the decision.

==== Statements on abortion ====
- 1989: Giuliani said, "There must be public funding for abortion for poor women. We cannot deny any woman the right to make her own decision about abortion because she lacks resources."

He had also stated that he disagreed with President [George H.W.] Bush's veto of public funding for abortions.

That year his campaign issued the following statement:

As mayor, Rudy Giuliani will uphold a woman's right of choice to have an abortion. Giuliani will fund all city programs which provide abortions to insure that no woman is deprived of her right due to an inability to pay. He will oppose reductions in state funding. He will oppose making abortion illegal. Although Giuliani is personally opposed to abortion, his personal views will not interfere with his responsibilities as mayor.

- 1993: He addressed a letter to a pro-choice group, National Abortion Rights Action League, saying, New York City "has an obligation to protect the constitutional right of women to choose abortion."
- 1997: During his reelection bid, he scored 100% on his questionnaire response to the local National Abortion Rights Action League chapter.
- 2000: During his competition with Hillary Clinton for a New York State seat in the United States Senate, he said that he supported then president Bill Clinton's veto of a law that banned intact dilation and extraction: "I would vote to preserve the option for women."

One of Giuliani's "12 Commitments", the twelve core issues of his 2008 campaign, addresses abortion:

Rudy Giuliani supports reasonable restrictions on abortion such as parental notification with a judicial bypass and a ban on partial birth abortion—except when the life of the mother is at stake. He's proud that adoptions increased 66% while abortions decreased over 16% in New York City when he was mayor. But Rudy understands that this is a deeply personal moral dilemma, and people of good conscience can disagree respectfully.

In a February 2007 interview with Sean Hannity, Giuliani said, "I hate [abortion] ... However, I believe in a woman's right to choose." Regarding Roe v. Wade, Giuliani says that the case has been on the books for some time and is a precedent, but as to whether to overrule it or limit it: "That's up to the court to decide."

These statements are consistent with his six contributions to Planned Parenthood in the 1990s. The payments, totaling $900, were made in 1993, 1994, 1998 and 1999. Planned Parenthood is one of the top abortion advocates and abortion providers in the United States.

Giuliani said in May 2007 that he would not make abortion a "litmus test" for Supreme Court judges as president. In June 2007, he declined to say whether Roe v. Wade should be overturned:

Should it be overturned? I don't answer that because I wouldn't want a judge to have to answer that. I don't consider it a litmus test. I think a conservative strict constructionist judge could come to either conclusion.

==== Late-term and "partial birth" abortion ====
As mayor, Giuliani stated that he was against banning late-term abortions, and that he didn't see his position on that changing. He told The Albany Times Union that he would not support a ban on late-term abortions. He also stated that Bill Clinton made the right decision when he vetoed legislation in 1997 banning intact dilation and extraction, often referred to as "partial birth abortion". Nonetheless, he praised a 2007 Supreme Court decision upholding a 2003 ban on the procedure, saying that this was because the 2003 law had included "more scientific language protecting the life of the mother." However, Media Matters disputed Giuliani's contention that more scientific language had been inserted into the 2003 bill.

==== Public funding for abortions ====
In 1989 and again in April 2007, Giuliani stated that he is in favor of publicly funded abortions. However, during the May 3, 2007, Republican Presidential Debate, he said that he was against federal funding. When asked why he supports the use of public funds for abortion, he said:

I don't. I support the Hyde Amendment. I hate abortion. I wish people didn't have abortions. I believe that the Hyde Amendment should remain the law. States should make their decision. Some states decide to do it. Most states decide not to do it. And I think that's the appropriate way to have this decided. I supported it in New York, but I think, in other places, people can come to a different decision.

=== Stem cell research ===
Giuliani supports the federal funding of embryonic stem cell research. During the May 3, 2007, Republican presidential debate, Giuliani explained his view:

As long as we're not creating life in order to destroy it, as long as we're not having human cloning, and we limit it to that, and there is plenty of opportunity to then use federal funds in those situations where you have limitations. So I would support [embryonic stem cell research] with those limitations.

=== Death penalty ===
Giuliani only favors capital punishment for murder in certain circumstances. One such example is that he has advocated the death penalty for terrorists following September 11 and for individuals convicted of killing a police officer in the line of duty.

=== Education ===
Giuliani expressed frustration with the New York City Board of Education. He said in April 1999 that he would like to "blow up" the [then] Board of Education.

The next day, the Board of Education chancellor, Rudy Crew responded with an open letter to the press, deeming Giuliani's comments "destructive" and "reckless."

When the mayor declares that the whole school system should be blown up, he tells 1.1 million children and thousands of parents, teachers and administrators that they are wasting their time.

==== Education vouchers ====
In May 1999, Mayor Giuliani advocated in favor of education vouchers, proposing to allocate several million dollars to allow poor children attending poor-performing public schools to attend private schools. In February 2007 reaffirmed his support for "school choice". However, he said his goal was not to end the American public school system. "I would not destroy it. I would revive it, reform it, and change it."

==== School prayer ====
In the 1998 case of a New York City public-school teacher who led her class in prayer, Mayor Giuliani condemned her actions and said that "if in fact she was using her position in order to teach her religion, then that would be a dismissible offense." Giuliani later said that the teacher should have received a warning rather than lose her job.

However, in 1999 Giuliani sent out national fundraising letters in which he portrayed himself as in favor of school prayer, the posting in schools of the Ten Commandments, and in general support for a greater role for faith in the public sphere. On August 15, 2007 Giuliani told an Iowa audience that government has gone too far in removing God from schools and that he supports prayers in school ceremonies. In 2000 the U.S. Supreme Court ruled against prayer before football games. Likewise a federal court in Iowa ruled against the singing of the Lord's Prayer at commencement ceremonies.

He also supports school prayer in regards to praying for victims of 9/11.

==== Teaching of evolution ====
Regarding the scientific theory of evolution, in a July 2006 public appearance in Arkansas, Giuliani said that "Darwin's theories are a very accepted part of science ... I am a Christian, and I can accommodate that to my beliefs."

=== Gun control/gun rights ===
As mayor of New York, Giuliani was a proponent of gun control, but, while running for President, has made statements supporting the right to carry concealed weapons.

During his time in the United States Department of Justice in the early 1980s, Giuliani said that a mandatory waiting period before purchasing a handgun was "sensible and moderate".

As Mayor of New York, Giuliani became a nationally visible figure in favor of national gun control measures, beginning with an appearance on Meet the Press in late 1993. He was in favor of the 1993 Brady Handgun Violence Prevention Act and the 1994 Federal Assault Weapons Ban.

Giuliani and then-president Bill Clinton exchanged correspondence in 1994 regarding Giuliani's support for the assault weapons ban. Clinton wrote to Giuliani in a May 6, 1994 letter: "Thank you very much for your efforts on behalf of H.R. 4296, the assault weapons ban." Clinton continued:

With your support and encouragement, the U.S. House of Representatives took a critical step toward getting assault weapons off the streets, out of neighborhoods, and out of the hands of criminals.

Clinton further said that he was "grateful" for Giuliani's "dedicated" support of the legislation.

On May 31, 1994 Giuliani replied, "Thank you for your autographed photo and kind note." He added, "Please know that you have my continued support for this crucial legislation." An October 13 letter thanked Clinton for a signing pen and said, "I look forward to continuing to work with you to reduce crime. ... "

He appeared on the Charlie Rose Show in 1995 and compared the National Rifle Association with "extremists." He said that the anti-gun control positions of many Republicans are "terrible for states and cities. They're terrible for America." After pointing to NYPD gun seizures and reductions of homicides and shootings in particular. He added that can New York City can "only so far, unless the federal government passes a law that keeps the 90 percent of guns from coming into New York from outside New York, helps us get control over that."

In February 1997 a gunman opened fire from atop the Empire State Building hitting seven people, killing one of these persons. Giuliani blamed lax gun laws for the shooting: "It should be as difficult to get a gun in Florida as it is in New York City." In 1997, while the Assault Weapons Ban was in effect, he called for a stricter federal ban on assault weapons and for handgun registration on the federal level. He also endorsed President Bill Clinton's proposals for more stringent federal gun-licensing requirements, "I applaud the President's [Clinton's] proposals, and I will support them any way I can." In the same speech he said, "... we may be able to find some sort of meaning in this tragedy [the Empire State Building shooting] by using it as a catalyst to revive national gun control efforts."

Beginning in 1997, he regularly criticized states in the Southern United States for having permissive laws on gun sales, that fed an illegal movement of guns into New York City; he said that 60 percent of guns found in New York came from Florida, Georgia, Virginia, and the Carolinas. He endorsed amendments to city laws requiring gun owners to use trigger locks and prohibiting guns within a thousand feet of schools.

In a newspaper article, published, March 21, 2000, Giuliani was quoted advocating a mandatory written test for gun owners: "I do not think the government should cut off the right to bear arms. My position for many years has been that just as a motorist must have a license, a gun owner should be required to have one as well. Anyone wanting to own a gun should have to pass a written exam that shows that they know how to use a gun, that they're intelligent enough and responsible enough to handle a gun."

On June 20, 2000, the City of New York filed a lawsuit against gun manufacturers and distributors. Giuliani accused gun companies of "deliberately manufacturing many more firearms than can be bought for the legitimate purposes of hunting and law enforcement." Giuliani also said, "This lawsuit is meant to end the free pass that gun industry has enjoyed for a very, very long time. ... The more guns you take out of society, the more you are going to reduce murder." The lawsuit remains active. During his abortive run for the New York Senate seat in 2000, he advocated a uniform national standard for all gun owners and supported legislation that gave New York State the most restrictive gun laws in the nation.

According to Gun Owners of America (GOA), Rudy's position of "Disarming citizens because they live in a high crime area is taking away the most effective means of self-defense from the people who need it most. Creating mandatory victims is no way to fight a crime problem." GOA further expressed significant concerns that "If Giuliani's gun control agenda was really limited 'only' to big cities, that would be disturbing enough. But the record shows that the Mayor continually tried to export his gun control agenda to the rest of the nation."

In a February 2007 Sean Hannity interview, he said that "[The right to carry a handgun] is part of the Constitution. People have a right to bear arms," and that while tough gun-control laws were needed in New York City, "in another place, more rural, more suburban ... you have a different set of rules." He applauded the March 2007 Parker v. District of Columbia United States Court of Appeals for the District of Columbia Circuit decision that struck down D.C.'s highly restrictive Firearms Control Regulations Act of 1975. His campaign officials declined to say whether Giuliani would still support the federal assault weapons ban, the imposition of federal rules on the states, or his claims about Southern states feeding weapons into the North. Giuliani has also stated that decisions regarding concealed carry laws should be left to the states.

=== Illegal drugs ===
During Giuliani's mayoralty he oversaw major crackdowns on illegal drugs, especially marijuana. He also indicated that he will not continue to arrest, prosecute, and imprison patients who use marijuana.

=== Immigration ===
As prosecutor under the Reagan administration in the 1980s, Giuliani defended the administration's position to keep thousands of Haitian refugees in detention centers rather than granting them asylum after they fled the regime of Jean-Claude Duvalier.

Giuliani was a strong defender of illegal immigrants' rights as mayor, fighting for them to be allowed to use public services and attend public schools. But he has changed some of his position on the 2007 campaign trail.

As Mayor of New York City, Giuliani encouraged hardworking illegal immigrants to move to New York City. He said:

Some of the hardest-working and most productive people in this city are undocumented aliens. If you come here and you work hard and you happen to be in an undocumented status, you're one of the people who we want in this city. You're somebody that we want to protect, and we want you to get out from under what is often a life of being like a fugitive, which is really unfair.

He pressed for $12 million to start a city agency which would help immigrants gain citizenship. He defended the city's policy of not allowing police and hospital workers to ask about citizenship status.

In 1996, Giuliani said, "Indeed, the whole process of immigration is something the Republican Party should embrace." In the same year, at a public talk at the John F. Kennedy School of Government he said, "We're never, ever going to be able to totally control immigration in a country that is as large as ours." He went on to say, "If you were to totally control immigration into the United States, you might very well destroy the economy of the United States, because you'd have to inspect everything and everyone in every way possible."

Giuliani sued the federal government on October 11, 1996 for what he called unconstitutional provisions against immigrants. In announcing his lawsuit he said,

"I believe the anti-immigration movement in America is one of our most serious public problems." He added: "I am speaking out and filing this action because I believe that a threat to immigration can be a threat to the future of our country."

Giuliani said that the Immigration and Naturalization Service "do nothing with those names but terrorize people." His lawsuit against the new immigration law claimed that the new federal requirement to report illegal immigrants violated the Tenth Amendment. He said that the law, as well as the Welfare Reform Act, were "inherently unfair." He pursued this lawsuit to the U.S. Supreme Court, but he lost the case.

In 1996 Giuliani voiced his support for New York City's sanctuary city policy saying:

[it] protects undocumented immigrants in New York City from being reported to the INS while they are using city services that are critical for their health and safety, and for the health and safety of the entire city ... There are times when undocumented immigrants must have a substantial degree of protection.

In 1997, Giuliani signed a statement of principles which read, "The new laws recently passed by Congress and signed into law by the President unfairly target immigrants in the United States by severely limiting their access to many federal benefits which citizens are entitled to receive." and "Since legal immigrants work and pay taxes like American citizens, they should be entitled to temporary assistance when they fall into personal difficulty. Furthermore, the denial of federal assistance to legal immigrants in need is patently unfair and arguably unconstitutional and inhumane." In 1998, Giuliani argued for expanding Medicare, SSI and foodstamp benefits to legal immigrants and also, "Providing full Medicaid coverage to Prucol aliens with HIV/AIDS and other chronic illnesses"

In April 2006, Giuliani went on the record as favoring the US Senate's comprehensive immigration plan which includes a path to citizenship and a guest worker plan. He rejected the US House approach because he does not think House Resolution 4437 could be enforced.

In February 2007, in a meeting with California Republicans, Giuliani was quoted as saying "We need a [border] fence, and a highly technological one." Giuliani also reiterated his support for some sort of path to citizenship for certain illegal immigrants after a process to be determined, but added that at the end of the process the immigrants should "display the ability to read and write English" and must assimilate into American society. In 2000, Giuliani said, "I wish that we would actually make America more open to immigrants." He does not believe in deportation of illegal immigrants and advocates a "tamper-proof" national ID card and database for illegal immigrants.

On September 7, 2007, during a CNN interview, he said that illegal immigrants are not criminals.

On the topic of legal immigration, in June 2007 Giuliani rejected Tom Tancredo's calls for a temporary stop of legal immigration. Giuliani stated: "We should always be open to legal immigration." In September 2007, Giuliani affirmed that legal immigration should be increased.

In 2018, working as President Donald Trump's personal lawyer, Giuliani disagreed with the Trump administration's separation of children from their parents, and he publicly supported "a pathway to citizenship for most of the millions of undocumented immigrants already living in the United States." Giuliani said that a comprehensive immigration bill would solve the border crises, and noted his record of supporting a pathway to citizenship in the past.

=== Judicial philosophy ===
His philosophy initially appeared moderate, but became increasingly conservative during the early stages of his presidential campaign in 2008. In a July 2005 appearance on Hannity & Colmes, Giuliani stated that having justices appointed with similar views on abortion to his own was "not the critical factor." He further stated that "what's important ... is to have a very intelligent, very honest, very good lawyer on the court. And [John Roberts] fits that category, in the same way Justice Ginsburg fit that category. I mean, she was – she maybe came at it from a very different political background, very qualified lawyer, very smart person. Lots of Republicans supported her."

In 2006, on numerous occasions, he has stated thoughtful well educated judges whether liberal or conservative would be what he would appoint. He would not hold any political philosophy as a litmus test.

But in a February 2007 interview with Hannity, Giuliani said he would nominate Supreme Court justices who are "very similar, if not exactly the same as," John Roberts and Samuel Alito. In a February 2007 interview with Hugh Hewitt, Giuliani mentioned those two as well as Antonin Scalia, Anthony Kennedy, and Clarence Thomas as models, and said that former Solicitor General Theodore Olson would possibly be one of his primary advisers in selecting judges on lower federal courts as well as Supreme Court justices. He further stated that abortion would still not be a litmus test and such views would not even be asked of any prospective nominee.

On July 17, 2007, at a campaign rally in Iowa, Giuliani stated that he would appoint judges like Clarence Thomas and Antonin Scalia (not mentioning the very slightly less conservative Roberts, Alito, or Kennedy) for the Supreme Court but abortion would still not be a litmus test either way.

=== LGBT issues ===
During Giuliani's mayoralty of New York City, gay and lesbian residents asked for domestic partnership rights. Giuliani, in turn, pushed the city's Democratic-controlled City Council, which had avoided the issue for years, to pass legislation providing broad protection for same-sex partners. "Fulfilling a promise made to the Pride Agenda in October 1997, on July 7 Mayor Rudolph Giuliani signed into law historic legislation broadly extending recognition of domestic partners in New York City." In 1998, he codified local law by granting all city employees equal benefits for their domestic partners. For this reform, the Empire State Pride Agenda, an LGBT political advocacy group, hailed this law as establishing "a new national benchmark for domestic partner recognition."

During his aborted 2000 run for office in the U.S. Senate, Giuliani declared: "The institution of marriage should remain defined as a man and a woman."

In 2003, Giuliani discussed his support for civil unions, which he said were the same as domestic partnerships. Giuliani said:

Marriage should be a man and a woman ... I think that the domestic partnership legislation in NY has worked very, very well. I think that's a good way to deal with it, and I think that would be a good model for other states to have. Some places call them domestic partnerships, some states call it civil unions, and I think that would be the best way to deal with it.

In a 2004 interview with Bill O'Reilly on Fox News, Giuliani said, "I'm in favor of ... civil unions." On NBC's "Meet the Press", also in 2004, Giuliani stated that he would oppose the federal ban on gay marriage.

In an April 27, 2007 New York Sun story, Ryan Sager stated that Giuliani made a "departure from his previously stated position on civil unions" when his campaign wrote:

Mayor Giuliani believes marriage is between one man and one woman. Domestic partnerships are the appropriate way to ensure that people are treated fairly. In this specific case the law states same sex civil unions are the equivalent of marriage and recognizes same sex unions from outside states. This goes too far and Mayor Giuliani does not support it.

Michael Long, chairman of the Conservative Party of New York stated, "I just don't see Rudy Giuliani being able to sway conservatives within the Republican Party. The gay marriage issue draws a line down the middle of the street, and Rudy Giuliani is something of a champion of gay rights." Bipartisan political consultant Joseph Mercurio said, "You can't get much more to the left than Giuliani was on gay issues."

According to 365 Gay News, "Giuliani said that broad-brush themes, like limited government, ought to define the Republican Party – not hot-button social issues like abortion and gay rights."

Giuliani opposed the Don't ask, don't tell policy, but thought the repeal of it should wait until after the war on terror is over.

He also supports LGBT adoption and sexual orientation to be added to hate crimes legislation.

The Empire State Pride Agenda issued a report of Giuliani's record and statements on LGBT rights.

Giuliani was invited to the wedding of Howard Koeppel and Mark Hsiao – the gay couple he lived with following his separation from Donna Hanover while Mayor – in Connecticut on May 2, 2009 but did not attend.

In 2015, Giuliani came out in support of gay marriage, and signed an amicus brief calling for the Supreme Court to legalize gay marriage.

In June 2016, Giuliani officiated his first same-sex wedding.

== Philosophies ==
=== Ideology vs. Pragmatism ===
"I've supported four or five hundred candidates in my time, but I've not yet found one with whom I can agree completely. In fact, I don't even agree with myself on everything." "There's not a candidate with a clean skirt out there. Hell, I've been married myself three times." Giuliani quoted by Tom Balkwin

=== Freedom vs. Authority ===
"We look upon authority too often and focus over and over again, for 30 or 40 or 50 years, as if there is something wrong with authority. We see only the oppressive side of authority. Maybe it comes out of our history and our background. What we don't see is that freedom is not a concept in which people can do anything they want, be anything they can be. Freedom is about authority. Freedom is about the willingness of every single human being to cede to lawful authority a great deal of discretion about what you do. You have free speech so I can be heard." Giuliani in a March 1994 speech on crime at a forum in New York City sponsored by the New York Post as quoted by The New York Times

Giuliani has expressed that he believes the President has the authority to arrest U.S. citizens with no judicial review, but that "he would want to use this authority infrequently".

== See also ==
- Mayoralty of Rudy Giuliani
- Rudy Giuliani presidential campaign, 2008
