= Clazz =

Clazz may refer to:

- clazz, a deliberate misspelling of the reserved word class
- Clazz, a dormant component of Apache Commons
- Clazz, a musical style invented by Surendran Reddy
- Clazz (Classical Jazz), a 2011 album by Calvin Newborn
