= Class (Pacifico novel) =

2014 novel by Francesco Pacifico

- First edition
- Author: Francesco Pacifico
- Language: Italian
- Publisher: Mondadori
- Publication date: 2014
- Publication place: Italy

Class is a 2014 novel by author Francesco Pacifico. It is set in the New York City borough of Brooklyn in 2010 and concerns a group of Italian expatriates living in Williamsburg. The novel was originally written in Italian and translated into English by Pacifico and Mark Krotov.
