= Prucol =

Permanent Residence Under Color of Law (PRUCOL) is an immigration-related status used under some US federal and state laws for determining eligibility for some public benefits, an example being unemployment benefits (26 U.S.C. § 3304(a)(14)(A)). It allows for a broader group of non-citizens to qualify for benefits than just those with green cards. This status is used solely for benefit application purposes and is not recognized as an immigration status by the U.S. Citizenship and Immigration Services (USCIS). This category was created by the courts and is a public benefits eligibility category. For a person to be residing "under color of law," the USCIS must know of the person’s presence in the U.S., and must provide the person with written assurance that enforcement of deportation is not planned. A person residing under PRUCOL status cannot directly apply for U.S. citizenship or sponsor family members to obtain U.S. Citizenship. A person from any country, who resides in the United States without current legal immigration status including, but not limited to, citizenship, permanent residency, unexpired immigrant visa, is an undocumented person. They are ineligible for most federal public benefits.

== Legal status ==
Under what came to be known as the "PRUCOL" doctrine, even an alien who was unquestionably present in the United States contrary to law could be PRUCOL. This was expounded by the United States Court of Appeals for the Second Circuit in Holley v. Lavine, 553 F.2d 845 (2d Cir. 1977). In the statutes defining eligibility criteria for federal benefits, the U.S. Congress provided for payment of benefits, not only to lawful immigrants, but to aliens "permanently residing under color of law." Thus, if the USCIS is aware of the alien's unlawful presence, but was not actively pursuing his or her deportation, the alien is eligible for benefits. Under this doctrine aliens with no legal right to remain in the United States are nevertheless eligible for public assistance.

The Personal Responsibility and Work Opportunity Reconciliation Act of 1996 ("PRWORA") basically abolished the PRUCOL Doctrine for means tested federal assistance by creating a new statutory definition of "qualified alien." It is true that the expression "permanently residing under color of law" remains in many Federal, State and City statutes and regulations; but, with a few exceptions clearly specified by statute, an alien "who is not a qualified alien is not eligible for any Federal public benefit." Congress has also made aliens ineligible for many public benefits available under State and local law.

== Children benefits ==
Section 153 of the Federal Immigration Act of 1990 provides Special Immigrant Juvenile Status (SIJS) to undocumented children who (1) are under 21, (2) are unmarried, (3) have been abandoned, neglected or abused by at least one birth parent, (4) have been declared dependent on the juvenile court (often through a guardianship proceeding) or deemed eligible for long-term foster care, and (5) for whom the court has declared that it is not in the child’s best interest to be returned to his country of origin. A grant of SIJS does not automatically confer lawful permanent resident status; instead, it makes the child eligible to apply for adjustment of status to that of lawful permanent resident.

Sometimes the derogatory term "anchor baby" is wrongly used to describe a child under PRUCOL status. The confusion stems from the fact that, because children born in the U.S. of one or two undocumented parents are U.S. citizens; once they become adults they may petition for their parents to gain legal status. The person under PRUCOL status is the parent, not the baby.

If a sibling petitions for the family member who entered the US without a visa, a return to and wait in the country of origin is mandatory.

== Categories ==
In general persons attain PRUCOL status by reason of a court decision of “stay of deportation”. In many cases it is left to the individual city or state benefits agency to decide if a person has this status. For additional information on one Agency’s definition of PRUCOL see Office of the New York City Mayor, Public Health Insurance Options

== Florida Homestead Exemption – PRUCOL Application ==
Under Florida law, only U.S. citizens, permanent resident aliens, or a someone holding PRUCOL status is eligible for a Homestead Exemption. A person in the U.S. with asylum or parole refugee status is considered PRUCOL. A person in the US under a temporary visa is NOT eligible for Homestead, pursuant to Rule 12D-7.007(3), Florida Administrative Code. A person in the U.S. under "Temporary Protected Status" is also not eligible. This is true under Florida law no matter how long you have owned your home and lived/worked in Florida—and regardless of how many times you are legally able to renew your visa.

== See also ==
- Anchor baby
- Illegal immigration to the United States
