= Di-β-phenylisopropylamine =

Central nervous system stimulant

Clinical data
- Drug class: Central nervous system stimulant; Serotonin 5-HT_{1A} receptor agonist; norepinephrine reuptake inhibitor; serotonin reuptake inhibitor; adrenergic agonist; prodrug
- ATC code: none

Pharmacokinetic data
- Metabolites: amphetamine

Identifiers
- CAS Number: 10509-86-1
- PubChem CID: 99869
- ChemSpider: 90234
- UNII: HNZ7L49KE6
- CompTox Dashboard (EPA): DTXSID00909322

Chemical and physical data
- Formula: C_{18}H_{23}N
- Molar mass: 253.389 g·mol^{−1}
- 3D model (JSmol): Interactive image
- SMILES: CC(CC1=CC=CC=C1)NC(C)CC2=CC=CC=C2
- InChI: InChI=1S/C18H23N/c1-15(13-17-9-5-3-6-10-17)19-16(2)14-18-11-7-4-8-12-18/h3-12,15-16,19H,13-14H2,1-2H3; Key:XIZFJFZATSHCAL-UHFFFAOYSA-N

di-β-phenylisopropylamine also known by the abbreviations DPIA or DPEA, or N,N-Di-β-phenylisopropylamine, and also under the code name Iem-1365, it is a central nervous system stimulant but, above all, a serotonergic agent that also exhibits adrenergic activity; it has been shown to cause central nervous system effects and toxicity similar to those of amphetamine.

DPIA is a secondary amine; structurally, the molecule can be described as comprising a single central amine, to which two isopropyl chains with benzene rings at their ends are attached symmetrically on either side.

== Pharmacology ==
=== Pharmacodynamics ===
DPIA is a norepinephrine transporter inhibitor with an IC₅₀ value of 3.1 µM, as well as a dopamine transporter inhibitor with a potency approximately 13 times weaker than that of amphetamine, but 7 times more potent than amphetamine in inhibiting the serotonin transporter, although, unlike amphetamine, DPIA does not exhibit monoamine-releasing activity. It exhibits moderate affinity for 5-HT_{1A} serotonin receptors (K_{i} = 3.5 µM) and for alpha-1A-adrenoreceptors (K_{i} = 0.12 µM), and binds to alpha-2A-adrenoreceptors and TAAR1.

In experiments on rodents, DPIA produced the same central effects and toxicity as amphetamine, but was less potent. Interestingly, unlike amphetamine, DPIA caused a reduction in heart rate and blood pressure (exhibiting cardiodepressant properties).

=== Pharmacokinetics ===
It is thought that the main metabolic pathway for DPIA is its conversion to amphetamine.
