= Jeffrey Webb (football executive) =

Football executive

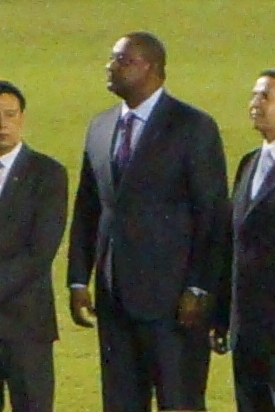
- Webb in 2015

CONCACAF president
- In office 23 May 2012 – 27 May 2015
- Preceded by: Alfredo Hawit
- Succeeded by: Alfredo Hawit

Personal details
- Born: September 24, 1964 (age 62) George Town, Cayman Islands
- Spouse: Kendra Gamble-Webb (m. 2013)
- Children: 1
- Education: Hillsborough Community College

Jeffrey D. Webb (born 24 September 1964) is the former president of CONCACAF and Cayman Islands Football Association (CIFA), and former vice president of FIFA. Webb was arrested for corruption charges on 27 May 2015 by Swiss police at the request of the U.S. Department of Justice on charges of racketeering, wire fraud, and money laundering conspiracy. He pleaded guilty in November 2015. In May 2015, he was banned by FIFA Ethics Committee.

== Career ==
Webb was educated at King High School and Hillsborough Community College, Tampa, Florida, in the United States.

His career in football spans almost three decades. He was appointed as President of the Cayman Islands Football Association in 1991.

Webb was a Business Development Manager at Western Union agent belonging to Fidelity Bank (Cayman) Limited, a subsidiary of Fidelity Bank & Trust International Limited, which is involved in retail banking, investment banking, corporate finance and asset management. Outside of banking, Webb co-owns a franchise of Burrell's bakery chain "Captain's Bakery" in the Cayman Islands.

=== Football ===
In 1994, he was co-opted as a member of the Caribbean Football Union Executive Committee, and member of FIFA’s Protocol Committee in 1995. Prior to his appointment to CIFA, Webb served as President of the local football club Strikers FC.

Within FIFA’s governing body, in 2002 Webb became Deputy Chairman of the FIFA Internal Audit Committee and subsequently Chairman in 2011. He is a former member of FIFA’s Transparency and Compliance Committee and, most recently, was appointed as member of FIFA’s Strategic, Finance, Organizing World Cup and Emergency Committees.

Webb also took part of FIFA’s delegations to the World Cup including France (1998), U.S. Women’s World Cup (1999), Korea/Japan (2002), Germany (2006), and South Africa (2010).

During Webb's time as CIFA President, it was reported that British players were being offered up to £70k to represent Cayman Islands at international football. It was wrongly thought that anyone with a British passport was eligible for the Cayman Islands national team. In March 2000, FIFA intervened and prevented several English players playing for the Cayman Islands.

=== CONCACAF ===
Webb was unanimously elected to lead the Confederation of North, Central America and the Caribbean Football Association (CONCACAF) on May 23, 2012, in Budapest, Hungary. He became the fourth President in the Confederation’s history, and the youngest leader of any regional association within FIFA to reach this position.

As President of CONCACAF, Webb also became FIFA Vice President and an official member of the governing body’s Executive Committee. Moreover, in March 2013 Webb was appointed by FIFA President Joseph Blatter as Chairman of the FIFA anti-discrimination task force, which was to oversee all matters related to discrimination within global football.

At the time of his appointment, in 2012, Webb was President of the Cayman Islands Football Association (CIFA).

Webb appointed a new Miami-based General Secretary, Enrique Sanz de Santamaría, enabling the CONCACAF head office to relocate to Miami.

== Corruption ==
In September 2014 Webb was one of several FIFA officials to call for the publication of the Garcia Report into allegations of corruption surrounding Russia and Qatar's bids for the 2018 and 2022 FIFA World Cups.

On 27 May 2015, Webb was arrested for corruption charges. The indictment, which named fourteen other individuals related to FIFA, included racketeering, wire fraud and money laundering conspiracy. In addition to senior football officials, the indictment also named sports-marketing executives from the United States and South America who are accused of paying more than $150 million in bribes and kickbacks in exchange for media deals associated with major football tournaments. Other football officials charged are Eduardo Li, Eugenio Figueredo, Jack Warner, Julio Rocha Lopez, Costas Takkas, Rafael Esquivel and Nicolás Leoz. Charges were also made against the sports-marketing executives Alejandro Burzaco, Aaron Davidson, Hugo Jinkis and Mariano Jinkis. Authorities also charged José Margulies as an intermediary who facilitated illegal payments. In November 2015, Webb pled guilty to racketeering, wire-fraud, and money laundering charges and further agreed to forfeit more than US$6.7 million.

Following his suspension, he was replaced by Alfredo Hawit at CONCACAF and Bruce Blake at CIFA.
