= El Presidente (TV series) =

Chilean drama television series

El Presidente (stylized as EL PRE$IDENTE) is a Chilean drama television series created by Armando Bó. It is based on the 2015 FIFA corruption case and is focused in the former president of ANFP Sergio Jadue, played by Colombian actor Andrés Parra. The first 8-episode season was released on June 5, 2020, on the streaming service Amazon Prime Video. An English dub of the series was released on November 6, 2020.

The second 8-episode season, marketed with the subtitle Jogo da Corrupção (The Corruption Game in English), was released on November 4, 2022.

== Plot ==
Season 1's story revolves around Sergio Jadue and his rise from president of Unión La Calera to president of the Asociación Nacional de Fútbol Profesional (ANFP). He becomes close to Julio Grondona, president of the Argentine Football Association at the time, and starts gaining power among the executives of CONMEBOL before being approached by an FBI Agent to assist in her investigation of money laundering and corruption towards these CONMEBOL executives.

Season 2's story revolves around João Havelange and how he turned FIFA from a simple sports organization into an international powerhouse. He usurps power from the Europeans and holds on to it for almost three decades.

== Production ==
Filming occurred in Talagante, Peñaflor, La Calera, La Pintana, Santiago de Chile, Luque, Buenos Aires and New York, among other locations.

== Cast ==
=== Season 1 ===
Actor	Role	Notes
Andrés Parra	Sergio Jadue	ANFP President.
Karla Souza	Lisa Harris, alias «Rosario»	FBI Agent, who uses Jadue to conduct her investigation on the FIFA Gate
Paulina Gaitán	María Inés «Nené» Facuse	Sergio Jadue's wife
Ana Reeves	Fátima Eltit	Sergio Jadue's Grandmother
Luis Margani	Julio Grondona	President of the Asociación del Fútbol Argentino.
Alberto Ajaka	Jashir Alabi	Sergio Jadue's right-hand man
Luis Gnecco	Luis Bedoya	President of the Federación Colombiana de Fútbol.
Daniel Muñoz	Jorge Segovia	President of SEK Group that controls Unión Española
Francisco Reyes	Cristián Varela	Director of Blanco y Negro S.A., representative of Colo-Colo
Gonzalo Robles	Rafael Esquivel	President of the Federación Venezolana de Fútbol
Sergio Hernández	Eugenio Figueredo	Vicepresident and FIFA Executive Member
Alejandro Trejo	Jose Maria Marin	President of Brazilian Football Confederation
Jean Pierre Noher	José Hawilla	Founder and President of Traffic Group, owner of the South American soccer TV rights
Federico Liss	Mariano Jinkis	Founder and board member of Full Play Group, company that purchased the TV rights from CONMEBOL in 2013
Cristóbal Tapia	Dave Summerfield	FBI Agent

=== Season 2 ===
Actor	Role	Notes
Andrés Parra	Sergio Jadue	ANFP President, Season 2's narrator
Albano Jerónimo	João Havelange	President of Confederação Brasileira de Desportos
Maria Fernanda Cândido	Anna Maria Havelange / Isabel	João Havelange's wife
Eduardo Moscovis	Castor de Andrade	Bicheiro, Havelange's ally
Bukassa Kabengele	Yidnekatchew Tessema	President of CAF
Guilherme Prates	Ricardo Teixeira	Havelange's son-in-law, Vitória's husband
Nelson Freitas	Humberto Castelo Branco / Emílio Médici / Ernesto Geisel	Presidents of Brazil
Leandro Firmino	Sivoca	Castor de Andrade's right-hand man
Anna Brewster	Faye Bossard	Assistant to the President of FIFA
Bruno Bebianno	Cédric Havelange	João's younger brother
Craig Stevenson	Stanley Rous	President of FIFA, serving from 1961 to 1974
Demétrio Nascimento Alves	Pelé	Brazilian footballer
Fabio Aste	Teófilo Salinas	President of Federación Peruana de Futbol
Juan Alari	Paco Lopez Gil	President of Real Federación Española de Fútbol
Philippe Jacq	Helmut Käser	General Secretary of FIFA
Polliana Aleixo	Vitória Havelange	João's daughter

=== Recurring cast ===
==== Season 1 ====
- Agustín Moya as Juan Ángel Napout, el President of CONMEBOL and vice president 1º of FIFA.
- Víctor Rojas as Luis Chiriboga, President of Federación Ecuatoriana de Fútbol.
- Jaime Omeñaca as Carlos Chávez Landívar, President of Federación Boliviana de Fútbol.
- Felipe Armas as Jaime Estévez, President of Club Deportivo Universidad Católica.
- Paulo Brunetti as Alejandro Burzaco, President of TyC (Torneos y Competencias).
- José Grünewald as El kiosquero in La Calera.
- Katyna Huberman as Olivia, lawyer and friend of "Nené"
- Blanca Lewin as Sofía Díaz, journalist of "El Andino"
- Adriano Castillo as waitress chief in Luque, Paraguay
- Millaray Lobos as Cecilia Domínguez, secretary of Sergio Jadue
- Antonia Giesen as Fanny, friend of Rosario
- Horacio Games as João Havelange, ex president of FIFA between 1974 and 1998
- Ignacia Uribe as Sara, cell phone thief
- Abián Vainstein as Joseph Blatter
- Heinz Krattiger as FIFA employee, righthand of Joseph Blatter
- Alejandro Bracho as Chuck Blazer, FIFA executive committee member
- Cristián García-Huidobro as José Yuraszeck, manager of Azul Azul, in charge of Universidad de Chile.
- Marcela Osorio as Neusa Marin, Luis Chiriboga's wife
- Tatiana Molina as Tania Hurtado
- Maricarmen Arrigorriaga as Martha Herrera
- Nicolás Poblete as journalist
- Heidrun Breier as Ruth, Swiss police
- Bastián Bodenhöfer as French detective
- Steevens Benjamin as security doorman
- Javier Bacchetta as Ciro Cesar Silva

==== Season 2 ====
- Lourinelson Vladmir as João Saldanha, Brazilian journalist and football manager
- Fabio Alberti as Augusto Raúl Juárez, Argentinian admiral
- Veruska Souza as Irene
- Marianna Armellini as Larissa, Isabel's lawyer friend and feminist
- Soren Hellerup as Adi Dassler, founder of Adidas
- Federico Salles as Horst Dassler, Adi Dassler's son
- Caroline Abras as Lena Dassler, Adi Dassler's daughter
- Isadora Ferrite as Dorinha, João and Isabel's maid
- Carlos Takeshi as Oé Kitana, President of Japan Football Association
- Hoji Fortuna as Jacques Ashanti
- Favio Posca as Jorge Rafael Videla
- Manuel Ossenkopf as Joseph Blatter
- Agustina Giovio as Barbara Käser, Helmut's daughter
- Joaquín Berthold as Armin Dassler, Horst and Lena's cousin and rival
- Ignacio Cawen as Johan Cruyff

== Episodes ==
=== Series overview ===
Season	Episodes	Originally released
1	8	June 5, 2020
2	8	November 4, 2022

=== Season 1 (2020) ===
No. overall	No. in season	Title	Directed by	Written by	Original release date
1	1	"Not your topo"	Armando Bó	Armando Bó	June 5, 2020
2	2	"Rosarito"	Armando Bó	Armando Bó	June 5, 2020
3	3	"Las pelotas"	Gabriel Díaz	Armando Bó	June 5, 2020
4	4	"En el palo"	Gabriel Díaz	Mariana Levy & Malena Vain	June 5, 2020
5	5	"Padre Nuestro"	Natalia Beristáin	Armando Bó	June 5, 2020
6	6	"Fifageit"	Natalia Beristáin	Armando Bó	June 5, 2020
7	7	"Mentira"	Armando Bó	Armando Bó	June 5, 2020
8	8	"Todo pasa"	Armando Bó	Armando Bó	June 5, 2020

=== Season 2 (2022) ===
No. overall	No. in season	Title	Directed by	Written by	Original release date
11	1	"Call me João"	Armando Bó	Unknown	November 4, 2022
12	2	"Africa, Here I Go"	Armando Bó	Unknown	November 4, 2022
13	3	"The Election"	Daniel Rezende	Unknown	November 4, 2022
14	4	"Welcome to Europe"	Daniel Rezende	Unknown	November 4, 2022
15	5	"God Save the Sheep"	Álvaro Brechner	Unknown	November 4, 2022
16	6	"Humans and Rights"	Álvaro Brechner	Unknown	November 4, 2022
17	7	"I Live for FIFA"	Daniela Thomas	Unknown	November 4, 2022
16	8	"What Corruption?"	Daniela Thomas	Unknown	November 4, 2022
