= José Maria Marin =

Brazilian politician and sports administrator (1932–2025)

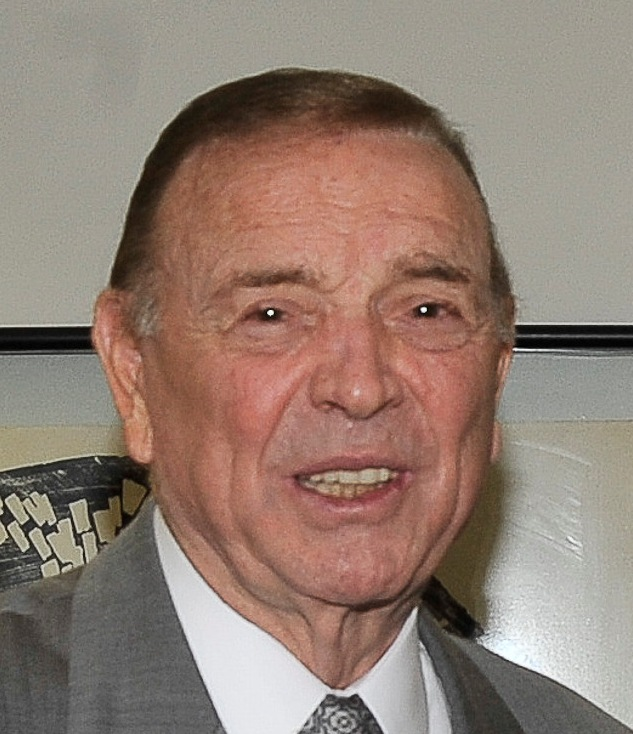

President of the Brazilian Football Confederation
- In office 12 March 2012 – 12 April 2015
- Preceded by: Ricardo Teixeira
- Succeeded by: Marco Polo Del Nero

Governor of São Paulo
- In office 14 May 1982 – 15 March 1983
- Vice Governor: None
- Preceded by: Paulo Maluf
- Succeeded by: Franco Montoro

Vice Governor of São Paulo
- In office 15 March 1979 – 14 May 1982
- Governor: Paulo Maluf
- Preceded by: Ferreira Filho
- Succeeded by: Orestes Quércia

State Deputy of São Paulo
- In office 15 March 1971 – 15 March 1979
- Constituency: At-large

Councillor of São Paulo
- In office 1 January 1964 – 21 December 1970
- Constituency: At-large

Personal details
- Born: 6 May 1932 São Paulo, Brazil
- Died: 20 July 2025 (aged 93) São Paulo, Brazil
- Party: PSD (2023–2025)
- Other political affiliations: PRP (1963–1965); ARENA (1965–1980); PDS (1980–1985); PFL (1985–2000); PSC (2000–2007); PTB (2007–2023)
- Profession: Lawyer

José Maria Marin (6 May 1932 – 20 July 2025) was a Brazilian politician and sports administrator who was the President of the Brazilian Football Confederation (Portuguese: Confederação Brasileira de Futebol, CBF) from March 2012 until April 2015. He had previously served as vice-governor and governor of São Paulo state and was a former football player.

Marin was arrested as part of the 2015 FIFA corruption case and was subsequently jailed for four years.

== Early life and football career ==
Marin was born in São Paulo on 6 May 1932. His father was from Galicia, Spain, and helped to popularise boxing in Brazil.

He was part of the São Paulo squad between 1950 and 1952 where as a striker he scored five goals in the 20 games he played.

== Political career ==
José Maria Marin was city councillor in 1960, state deputy in 1970, and from 1979 to 1982 he was vice-governor of São Paulo. He was governor of São Paulo from 14 May 1982 to 15 March 1983 as a replacement for Paulo Maluf. Marin joined the Brazilian Labor Party in 2007.

== Brazilian Football Confederation ==
José Maria Marin was president of the Federação Paulista de Futebol from 1982 to 1988. He was vice-president of the Brazilian Football Confederation, representing the Southeastern Region, from 2008 to 2012.

Due to health issues, Ricardo Teixeira withdrew from his position as president of the Brazilian Football Confederation, whereupon Marin was appointed caretaker president of the confederation on 8 March 2012. After Teixeira resigned on 12 March 2012, Marin was appointed the new president of the Brazilian Football Confederation and of the 2014 FIFA World Cup committee.

== Controversies ==
On 25 January 2012, when Marin was vice-president of CBF, during the medal ceremony of the Copa São Paulo de Futebol Júnior, won by Corinthians, at Estádio do Pacaembu, he surreptitiously put in his pocket one of the gold medals that he was supposed to hand over to Corinthians players, as a result of which, goalkeeper Matheus Vidotto was left without a medal. This act was broadcast live by Rede Bandeirantes. The incident caused an uproar and was much talked about in social networks. Two months later, when he became president of CBF, Marin called the episode "a real joke".

On 2 April 2013, the son of murdered Brazilian journalist Vladimir Herzog petitioned for Marin's removal from the CBF and FIFA because of the speeches Marin had delivered while a congressional representative in 1975 that praised Sérgio Fleury, who was head of the Department of Political and Social Order (Departamento de Ordem Politica e Social) during Brazil's military dictatorship, and for criticising Herzog in speeches. Fleury has been accused of involvement in torture. Herzog's 1975 death certificate was officially changed by court order from suicide to murder by torture in March 2013 after 37 years.

On 27 May 2015, Marin was arrested for corruption charges in connection with the 2015 FIFA corruption case. The indictment under which Marin was arrested names 14 people on charges including racketeering, wire fraud, and money laundering conspiracy. In addition to senior soccer officials, the indictment also named sports-marketing executives from the United States and South America who are accused of paying more than $150 million in bribes and kickbacks in exchange for media deals associated with major soccer tournaments. Other soccer officials charged are Eduardo Li, Jeffrey Webb, Eugenio Figueredo, Jack Warner, Julio Rocha, Costas Takkas, Rafael Esquivel and Nicolás Leoz. Marin was subsequently banned by the FIFA Ethics Committee.

In August 2018, Marin was sentenced to prison for four years. He was also fined $1.2 million and ordered to forfeit $3.34 million. On 30 March 2020, it was decided that Marin would be released early with the judge citing his: "advanced age, significantly deteriorating health, elevated risk of dire health consequences due to the current COVID-19 outbreak, status as a non-violent offender, and service of 80% of his original sentence".

== Death ==
Marin died on 20 July 2025, at the age of 93.

Political offices
Preceded by Ferreira Filho	Vice Governor of São Paulo; 1979–1982	Succeeded by Orestes Quércia
Preceded by Paulo Maluf	Governor of São Paulo; 1982–1983	Succeeded by André Franco Montoro
Sporting positions
Preceded by Ricardo Teixeira	President of the Brazilian Football Confederation; 2012–2015	Succeeded by Marco Polo Del Nero
Preceded by Danny Jordaan and Irvin Khoza	FIFA World Cup Chief Organiser; 2014–2015	Succeeded by Marco Polo Del Nero
