= Jinkis =

Jinkis is a surname. Notable people with the surname include:

- Hugo Jinkis (born 1945), Argentinian businessman
- Mariano Jinkis (born 1974), Argentinian businessman, son of Hugo
