= 2015 FIFA corruption case =

Cases of corruption by officials and associates connected with FIFA

- Native name: Affaire de corruption à la FIFA (in French)
- English name: FIFA corruption case
- Venue: Hotel Baur au Lac, Zurich, Switzerland
- Also known as: FIFA Gate
- Participants: 11 FIFA officials
- Outcome: Sepp Blatter resigned as FIFA president; Investigation launched into the 2022 FIFA World Cup
- Accused: (Bolivia) Carlos Chávez Landivar; (Uruguay) Eugenio Figueredo; (Argentina) Hugo Jinkis; (Argentina) Mariano Jinkis; (Paraguay) Nicolás Leoz; (Peru) Manuel Burga Seoane; (Brazil) José Maria Marin; (Paraguay) Juan Ángel Napout; (Nicaragua) Julio Rocha López; (Cayman Islands) Costas Takkas; (Brazil) Ricardo Teixeira; (Trinidad and Tobago) Jack Warner
- Verdict: People: (United States) Chuck Blazer (guilty plea); (Argentina) Alejandro Burzaco (guilty plea); (Venezuela) Rafael Esquivel (guilty plea); (Brazil) José Hawilla (guilty plea); (Honduras) Alfredo Hawit (guilty plea); (Brazil) José Margulies (guilty plea); (Trinidad and Tobago) Daryan Warner (guilty plea); (Chile) Sergio Jadue (guilty plea); (Cayman Islands) Jeffrey Webb (guilty plea); (Costa Rica) Eduardo Li (guilty plea); (United States) Aaron Davidson (guilty plea); Corporations: Traffic Sports International Inc. (guilty plea); Traffic Sports USA (guilty plea)

In 2015, United States federal prosecutors disclosed cases of corruption by officials and associates connected with the Fédération Internationale de Football Association (FIFA), the governing body of association football, futsal and beach soccer.

Near the end of May 2015, fourteen people were indicted in connection with an investigation by the United States Federal Bureau of Investigation (FBI) and the Internal Revenue Service Criminal Investigation (IRS-CI) division into wire fraud, racketeering, and money laundering. The United States attorney general simultaneously announced the unsealing of the indictments and the prior guilty pleas by four football executives and two corporations.

The investigation revolved around collusion between officials of continental football bodies CONMEBOL (South America) and CONCACAF (Caribbean, Central and North America), and sports marketing executives. The sports marketing executives were holders of media and marketing rights for high-profile international competitions including the FIFA World Cup qualifying tournaments in the Americas, the CONCACAF Gold Cup and the Copa América.

CONCACAF president Jeffrey Webb, also serving president of the Cayman Islands Football Association, was arrested in connection with the investigation, as was former CONMEBOL president Nicolás Leoz, while two sitting FIFA Executive Committee members were also arrested: Eduardo Li of the Costa Rican Football Federation and Eugenio Figueredo, formerly of the Uruguayan Football Association. The investigation lasted several years, with the first arrest, of former CONCACAF president Jack Warner's son Daryll, made in July 2013.

In total, seven then-current FIFA officials were arrested at the Hotel Baur au Lac in Zurich on 27 May. They were preparing to attend the 65th FIFA Congress, which was scheduled to include the election of the president of FIFA. They were expected to be extradited to the United States on suspicion of receiving US$150 million in bribes. There was also a simultaneous raid on the CONCACAF headquarters in Miami Beach, and later, two further men handed themselves in to police for arrest: Jack Warner and marketing executive Alejandro Burzaco. Two further arrests of FIFA officials at the hotel occurred in December 2015.

The arrests case triggered Australia, Colombia, Costa Rica, Germany and Switzerland to open or intensify separate criminal investigations into top FIFA officials for corruption.

== Allegations ==
The 2015 case was centred on the alleged use of bribery, fraud and money laundering to corrupt the issuing of media and marketing rights for FIFA games in the Americas, estimated at $150 million, including at least $110 million in bribes related to the Copa América Centenario to be hosted in 2016 in the United States. The indictment handed down by the U.S. District Court in Brooklyn, New York, alleges that bribery was used in an attempt to influence clothing sponsorship contracts, the selection process for the 2010 FIFA World Cup host, and the 2011 FIFA presidential election. Specifically, an unnamed sports equipment company – identified in multiple sources as Nike, Inc. – is alleged to have paid at least $40 million in bribes to become the sole provider of uniforms, footwear, accessories, and equipment to the Brazil national team.

In December 2010, federal law enforcement agents secured the undercover cooperation of American football executive and CONCACAF official Chuck Blazer. The FBI's New York office had begun its probe as a spin-off of an unrelated organised crime investigation, and in August 2011, IRS-CI's Los Angeles office began investigating Blazer's alleged failure to file personal income tax returns. In December 2011, IRS-CI became aware of what the FBI was up to from news reports and the two offices began a joint investigation of Blazer.

They were investigating Blazer's involvement in the bidding process for host countries for the FIFA World Cups from the early 1990s onwards. The United States is one of five countries that broadly exercise worldwide jurisdiction to tax the net income of its citizens from any source in the world. It also requires taxpayers to report and pay tax on illegal income, and exercises worldwide jurisdiction over all financial institutions with U.S.-based account holders. Blazer agreed to cooperate almost immediately after two agents approached him in New York and confronted him with proof of his tax crimes.

In December 2010, Prince William, Duke of Cambridge and British Prime Minister David Cameron attended a meeting with FIFA vice-president Chung Mong-joon in which a vote-trading deal for the right to host the 2018 World Cup was discussed.

In November 2013, Blazer pleaded guilty to 10 criminal charges including wire fraud conspiracy, money laundering, and offences involving income tax and banking. Blazer's guilty plea had aimed to stave off a more serious charge of racketeering, which carried a potential 20-year prison sentence. Blazer later made covert recordings of meetings with FIFA officials, reportedly using a concealed device during the 2012 Summer Olympics. The information against Blazer (the charging document used in lieu of an indictment for a plea bargain) was revealed on 27 May 2015, the same day that the arrests were made in Zurich.

In 2011, Phaedra Al-Majid, who was part of the successful 2022 Qatari World Cup Bid, came forward as a whistle-blower. She claimed that Qatar paid $1.5 million to African Football Confederation president Issa Hayatou, Ivory Coast FIFA member Jacques Anouma and Nigeria's suspended official Amos Adamu to vote for Qatar; all three denied the allegations. She later stated that she had fabricated her claims for media attention. Al-Majid co-operated with the Garcia Report.

In November 2014, she stated that she was coerced into withdrawing her allegations as she feared for her safety and due to her lack of legal representation. As of June 2015, she was in FBI protective custody, when she stated, "The FBI have everything... There are people who are annoyed with me [for speaking out], and what really irks them is that I'm a female, Muslim whistleblower... I just don't think Blatter actually intends to quit. Everything he does is very calculated. He'll try very hard to save himself, I'm sure of it."

In May 2011, The Sunday Times published claims from a whistle-blower that President of CAF Issa Hayatou had, along with fellow Executive Committee member Jacques Anouma, accepted $1.5 million bribes from Qatar to secure his support for their bid for the 2022 FIFA World Cup.

In 2013, former FIFA President João Havelange and the Brazilian Football Confederation President Ricardo Teixeira were both found to have taken bribes worth millions of dollars. FIFA executive committee member Manilal Fernando was sanctioned with a lifetime ban for bribery and corruption.

=== $10 million South African payment ===
In the wake of the corruption case, it was reported that in 2008 the general secretary of FIFA, Jérôme Valcke was alleged to have transferred $10 million that had been given to FIFA by Danny Jordaan, president of the South African Football Association, to accounts controlled by Jack Warner, then head of CONCACAF. The payment is a key piece of the American prosecutors' indictment that accuses Warner of taking a bribe in exchange for helping South Africa secure the right to host the 2010 FIFA World Cup.

The payment from the South African Football Association had been intended to support the development of football in the Caribbean. $1.6 million of the South African payment was used by Warner to pay personal loans and credit cards and a further $360,000 was withdrawn by people connected to Warner. The Trinidadian supermarket chain JTA Supermarkets also received $4,860,000 from the FIFA payment.

=== Laws used in charging ===
The Department of Justice has not charged anyone at FIFA with bribery. Prosecutors have instead alleged racketeering, wire fraud, and money laundering conspiracies under the Racketeer Influenced and Corrupt Organizations Act (RICO) Act, which was intended for use against the Mafia. In addition, officials have been charged with violations of the Travel Act. The relevant part of the law essentially says that it is illegal to engage in interstate or foreign travel, or use the mails or "any facility in interstate commerce" to promote, manage, establish or carry on an illegal activity. That activity can be illegal under either federal or state law.

Bribery is definitely included on the list of what is considered an illegal activity under the Travel Act. Any relevant transaction, even if it is only tangentially related to America, can be targeted. In one instance, a representative of First Caribbean International Bank in the Bahamas flew to New York to pick up a cheque for $250,000 (the alleged bribe) from the bribe recipient to transport it safely back to the defendant's bank account.

=== Swiss criminal inquiries ===
FIFA commissioned former United States Attorney Michael J. Garcia to investigate and report on the bidding processes behind the awarding of the 2018 FIFA World Cup to Russia and the 2022 FIFA World Cup to Qatar. In November 2014, FIFA made a copy of Garcia's report available to the Attorney General of Switzerland, who then stated that there were "grounds for suspicion that, in isolated cases, international transfers of assets with connections to Switzerland took place which merit examination by the criminal prosecution authorities".

Sepp Blatter had been president of FIFA since 1998 (until his removal in December 2015). The Guardian said that FIFA's actions would "... inevitably be viewed with cynicism given Blatter's track record of using the Swiss courts and FIFA's regulatory processes to kick problematic issues into the long grass and deflect attention onto individuals who have already left football".

In May 2015, on the same day as the arrests resulting from the FBI's investigation and in a separate action, the Swiss prosecuting authorities launched a criminal inquiry on "suspicion of criminal mismanagement and of money laundering" concerning the 2018 and 2022 bidding processes. The Swiss authorities seized "electronic data and documents" in a raid on FIFA's Zürich headquarters. The Swiss police also planned to question ten members of the FIFA Executive Committee who participated in the December 2010 votes that chose the hosts for the 2018 and 2022 world cups.

In September 2015, Switzerland began investigating a payment Blatter authorised in 2011 to the president of the Union of European Football Associations (UEFA) Michel Platini for work done between 1999 and 2002. They also launched an investigation of possible "criminal mismanagement" by Blatter in a 2005 TV rights deal he signed with Jack Warner. In March 2017, FIFA submitted 1300 pages of reports to the Swiss Attorney General's office. After investigation, in November 2021 Blatter and Platini were charged with fraud in relation to the 2 million Swiss franc payment made from FIFA funds to Platini in 2011.

=== Television rights ===
In September 2015, Swiss public television channel SRF published that Blatter would have sold the 2010 and 2014 FIFA World Cup rights in North America for US$600,000, a small fraction of their market value.

Torneos & Traffic (T&T) is a subsidiary of Fox International Channels since 2005 (with investments since 2002). It is the same company named in legal documents relating to allegations of corruption in the acquisition of media rights for South American football tournaments.

== Indicted individuals and corporations ==
A total of 18 individuals and two corporations have been indicted, including nine FIFA officials and five businessmen.

=== Initial indictments ===
==== Individuals ====
Name	Nationality	Position	Status	Ref.
Chuck Blazer	United States	Former General Secretary of CONCACAF	Guilty plea	
Alejandro Burzaco	Argentina	CEO of Torneos y Competencias	Guilty plea	
Aaron Davidson	United States	Chairman of the board of Governors of the North American Soccer League and President of Traffic Sports USA	Guilty plea	
Rafael Esquivel	Venezuela	President of the Venezuelan Football Federation and member of the CONMEBOL executive committee	Guilty plea	
Eugenio Figueredo	Uruguay; United States	FIFA vice president, former president of the Uruguayan Football Association, and former president of CONMEBOL	Arrested	
José Hawilla	Brazil	Owner and founder of Traffic Group	Guilty plea	
Alfredo Hawit	Honduras	President of CONCACAF; FIFA Vice-president	Guilty plea	
Sergio Jadue	Chile	Former President of Football Federation of Chile and member of the CONMEBOL executive committee	Guilty plea	
Hugo Jinkis	Argentina	President of Full Play Group	Surrendered	
Mariano Jinkis	Argentina	Vice-president of Full Play Group S.A.; son of Hugo Jinkis	Surrendered	
Nicolás Leoz	Paraguay; Colombia	Former President of CONMEBOL	Arrested (Died)	
Eduardo Li	Costa Rica	President of the Costa Rican Football Federation, member-elect of the FIFA executive committee, and member of the CONCACAF executive committee	Guilty Plea	
José Margulies	Brazil	Secretary-General of Traffic Sports Brazil	Guilty Plea	
José Maria Marin	Brazil	Former President of the Brazilian Football Confederation and former Governor of São Paulo	Convicted	
Juan Ángel Napout	Paraguay	President of CONMEBOL; FIFA Vice-president	Convicted	
Julio Rocha López	Nicaragua	President of the Nicaraguan Football Federation, FIFA development officer, and former president of the Central American Football Union	Guilty Plea	
Costas Takkas	Cayman Islands	Former General Secretary of the Cayman Islands Football Association and Attaché to the CONCACAF President	Guilty Plea	
Carlos Chávez Landivar	Bolivia	President of the Bolivian Football Federation and former treasurer of the CONMEBOL	Arrested (Died)	
Daryan Warner	Trinidad and Tobago; Grenada	Son of Jack Warner	Guilty plea	
Daryll Warner	Trinidad and Tobago; United States	Son of Jack Warner and former FIFA development officer	Guilty plea	
Jack Warner	Trinidad and Tobago	Former vice president of FIFA, former president of CONCACAF, and former minister of national security	Arrested	
Jeffrey Webb	Cayman Islands	President of CONCACAF, President of the Cayman Islands Football Association, and FIFA Vice President	Guilty plea	

==== Corporations ====
Name	Nationality	Description	Status	Ref.
Traffic Sports International	British Virgin Islands	Football events management company and subsidiary of Traffic Group	Guilty plea	
Traffic Sports USA	United States	Football events management company and subsidiary of Traffic Group	Guilty plea	
US Imagina LLC	United States	Media company and subsidiary of Spanish Mediapro group	Guilty plea	

=== Second indictment ===
The December indictment included the following 16 individuals:

Name	Nationality	Position	Status	Ref.
Ariel Alvarado	Panama	Former member of the FIFA Disciplinary Committee. Former CONCACAF Executive Committee member		
Manuel Burga	Peru	Former member of the FIFA Development Committee. Former Peruvian soccer federation president.	Arrested	
Rafael Callejas	Honduras	Former member of the FIFA Television and Marketing Committee. Former Honduran football federation president and former president of the Republic of Honduras.	Guilty Plea	
Carlos Chávez	Bolivia	Former CONMEBOL treasurer. Former Bolivian football federation president.	Arrested	
Luis Chiriboga	Ecuador	Former Ecuadorian football federation president and member of the CONMEBOL Executive Committee.	Arrested	
Eduardo Deluca	Argentina	Former CONMEBOL general secretary.		
Marco Polo Del Nero	Brazil	Former president of the Brazilian football federation.		
Alfredo Hawit	Honduras	Former FIFA vice president and executive committee member and CONCACAF president.	Guilty Plea	
Brayan Jiménez	Guatemala	Former Guatemalan football federation president and member of the FIFA Committee for Fair Play and Social Responsibility.	Guilty Plea	
José Luis Meiszner	Argentina	Former CONMEBOL general secretary.	Arrested	
Juan Ángel Napout	Paraguay	Former FIFA vice president, Executive Committee member and CONMEBOL president, Paraguayan football federation president.	Arrested	
Romer Osuna	Bolivia	Former member of the FIFA Audit and Compliance Committee. Former CONMEBOL treasurer.	Died	
Rafael Salguero	Guatemala	Former FIFA Executive Committee member and Guatemalan football federation president.	Guilty Plea	
Ricardo Teixeira	Brazil	Former Brazilian football federation president and FIFA Executive Committee member.		
Héctor Trujillo	Guatemala	Former Guatemalan football federation general secretary and judge on the Constitutional Court of Guatemala.	Guilty Plea	
Reynaldo Vasquez	El Salvador	Former Salvadoran football federation president.	Guilty Plea	
Roger Huguet	Spain	CEO of US Imagina LLC (Mediapro subsidiary)	Guilty Plea	
Fabio Tordin	Italy	Executive of US Imagina LLC and former CEO of Traffic Sports USA	Guilty Plea	
Gerard Romy	Spain	Co-founder and co-CEO of Mediapro	Fugitive	

== Timeline of events ==
=== Historical events leading to the arrests ===
In 2001, FIFA affiliate International Sports and Leisure went bankrupt in what were viewed in some circles as suspicious circumstances. In 2002 a FIFA whistleblower contacted British journalist Andrew Jennings relating to alleged corruption within FIFA itself.

Following investigations Swiss magistrate Thomas Hildbrand seized documents from FIFA offices in 2005 and in 2007 Jennings published a book – Foul – and broadcast the BBC Panorama documentary "The Beautiful Bung: Corruption and the World Cup". Panorama later aired the "Fifa and Co" documentary in 2007, which contained an allegation of soliciting a bribe against Jack Warner and a court judgement that Jérôme Valcke had lied in FIFA business dealings. These reports led the FBI to contact Jennings in 2009.

On 29 November 2010 the BBC broadcast FIFA's Dirty Secrets, a second documentary by Jennings. This was aired just days before the results of the 2018 and 2022 FIFA World Cup bids in Zurich, Switzerland. Following the bidding process, FIFA announced that Russia and Qatar had won the rights to stage the 2018 and 2022 World Cups respectively. The result immediately caused controversies, as Russia is accused of a high level of racism in football. After it was announced that Russia would host the 2018 FIFA World Cup, Dr Rafał Pankowski, a head of UEFA FARE Monitoring Centre, accused the Russian Football Union of downplaying racist chants in stadiums.

The annexation of Crimea by the Russian Federation in 2014 led to several British and American politicians calling on FIFA to overturn its decision of hosting the 2018 World Cup in Russia. Criticism from a number of media outlets, sporting experts, and human rights groups also highlighted problems such as Qatar's limited football history, the high expected cost, the local climate, and Qatar's human rights record. Since in summer temperature will reach more than 50 °C (122 °F) in Qatar, it was announced on 24 February 2015 that a winter World Cup would go ahead in favour of the traditional summertime event.

In 2011, former MI6 spy Christopher Steele began providing information and sources to the FBI, which helped advance the investigation.

In May 2011 a whistleblower later revealed to be Phaedra Almajid who was a member of the Qatari bid team for the 2022 World Cup, claimed that money was paid to FIFA's executive committee in order to buy votes. However, she retracted these claims in July 2011, later claiming that she had been coerced into making these retractions.

In May 2013, former CONCACAF executive Chuck Blazer was arrested (and later indicted) on bribery charges. Jack Warner and Blazer were suspended from FIFA at around the same time. Then on 17 October 2014 FIFA announced that the Garcia Report into alleged bribery during the 2018 and 2022 FIFA World Cup bids could not be released in full for legal reasons. Garcia later claimed that a summary of the report that was released misrepresents his findings.

=== Mediapro involvement ===
On December 14, 2014, Spanish UDEF agents and FBI officials searched Mediapro's Barcelona and Madrid offices at the request of US authorities as part of the emerging FIFA corruption investigation. In the initial May 27, 2015 indictments, Mediapro appeared anonymously as "Sports Marketing Company C." Following the December 3, 2015 superseding indictment that revealed guilty pleas by Roger Huguet and Fabio Tordin, Imagina Media immediately suspended and terminated Gerard Romy (co-CEO), Huguet, and Tordin in December 2015. On July 10, 2018, US Imagina LLC pleaded guilty to two counts of wire fraud conspiracy and was ordered to pay over $24 million in fines, forfeiture, and restitution. On March 18, 2020, Gerard Romy was indicted on 53 counts including racketeering conspiracy, wire fraud, and money laundering.

=== Arrests ===
On the morning of 27 May 2015, seven FIFA officials were arrested just before the start of the 65th FIFA Congress. Two days later Sepp Blatter comfortably defeated Prince Ali bin Hussein to remain as President of FIFA. David Gill threatened to resign his newly elected role as FIFA Vice-president and member of the FIFA Executive Committee. 41 arrests in total had been made with both organizations and individuals being arrested.

Within these arrests, 14 people have been convicted. Out of these 14, there are 12 individuals and 2 organisations. They were all charged with things like "racketeering, wire fraud, and money laundering conspiracies". The investigations continued with the chance of more arrests remaining likely, on which US Attorney General Loretta Lynch stated that the Department of Justice was aware that there are more corrupt officials and organizations, and expressed its commitment to catch all who were involved.

=== May 2015 ===
On 27 May 2015, during the FIFA annual meeting at the Baur au Lac hotel in Zurich, authorities charged 14 officials, including nine current or former FIFA executives, including FIFA vice-president Jeffrey Webb. All faced extradition to the United States. On the same day, the Swiss attorney general's office said that other FIFA executives were being questioned on suspicion of "criminal mismanagement" and money laundering.

=== June 2015 ===
On 2 June 2015 a letter was published, claiming that Jérôme Valcke was party to a potential bribe paid to former FIFA executive Jack Warner in relation to votes for the 2010 FIFA World Cup in South Africa. Despite his win just four days previously, Sepp Blatter announced his resignation as FIFA President.

The following day, South Africa sports minister Fikile Mbalula denied the $10 million payment to Warner was a bribe.

Later that day, the FBI unsealed the transcript of the allocution made by former FIFA member and head of CONCACAF, Chuck Blazer which he had made when he pleaded guilty in 2013 to various charges as part of an apparent plea bargain. In Blazer's partially-redacted allocution, he claimed that he "and others, while acting in our official capacities, agreed to participate in a scheme to defraud FIFA and CONCACAF of the right to honest services by taking undisclosed bribes" and that he had "agreed with others in or around 1992 to facilitate the acceptance of a bribe in conjunction with the selection of the host nation for the 1998 World Cup. I and others on the FIFA executive committee agreed to accept bribes in conjunction with the selection of South Africa as the host nation for the 2010 World Cup".

On 6 June, Phaedra Almajid, who had been placed under the protective custody of the FBI, claimed that FIFA would be forced to strip Qatar from hosting the 2022 World Cup.

On 9 June, Italian-Argentinian Alejandro Burzaco was arrested in Italy. The two remaining Argentinian businessmen indicted, Hugo Jinkis and Mariano Jinkis, surrendered to a court in Buenos Aires on 18 June.

=== September 2015 ===
On 17 September 2015, FIFA stated that Jérôme Valcke had been put on leave and released from his duties until further notice. The decision was made by the FIFA Emergency Committee after a series of allegations implicated Valcke of selling World Cup tickets for above face value.

On 25 September, criminal proceedings were started against Blatter by Swiss prosecutors on suspicion of criminal mismanagement and misappropriation. Blatter denied any wrongdoing.

=== October 2015 ===
On 8 October 2015, FIFA President Sepp Blatter, Secretary General Jerome Valcke and UEFA President Michel Platini were suspended for 80 days by FIFA's Ethics Committee. Blatter appealed the suspension but lost the appeal on 18 November 2015.

=== November 2015 ===
German police searched the headquarters of the German Football Association over allegations of illegal deals before the 2006 World Cup. The head of president of the German Football Association, Wolfgang Niersbach, resigned. Marco Polo del Nero of Brazil, president of the Brazilian football federation announced his resignation from FIFA Executive Committee on 26 November 2015.

=== December 2015 ===
On 3 December 2015, FIFA vice-presidents Alfredo Hawit and Juan Angel Napout were arrested on suspicion of bribery in the same Zurich hotel where seven FIFA officials had been arrested in May 2015. Hours later, the U.S. Department of Justice revealed an additional 16 indictments for criminal schemes; as well, former CONCACAF president Jeffrey Webb pleaded guilty to money laundering, wire fraud and racketeering.

On 21 December, the FIFA Ethics Committee banned both Sepp Blatter and Michel Platini for eight years from all football-related activity organised by FIFA after being found guilty of a £1.3 million ($2 million) "disloyal payment" made to Platini in 2011. Blatter said he would appeal the verdict.

=== January 2016 ===
On 9 January 2016, the FIFA Emergency Committee decided to dismiss Jérôme Valcke as FIFA Secretary General and to terminate his employment relationship.

=== February 2016 ===
On 26 February 2016, an extraordinary FIFA Congress was held and elected UEFA Secretary General Gianni Infantino as the new president of FIFA while also passing a major reform package.

== Response to indictments ==
=== FIFA ===
==== Blatter's "resignation" ====
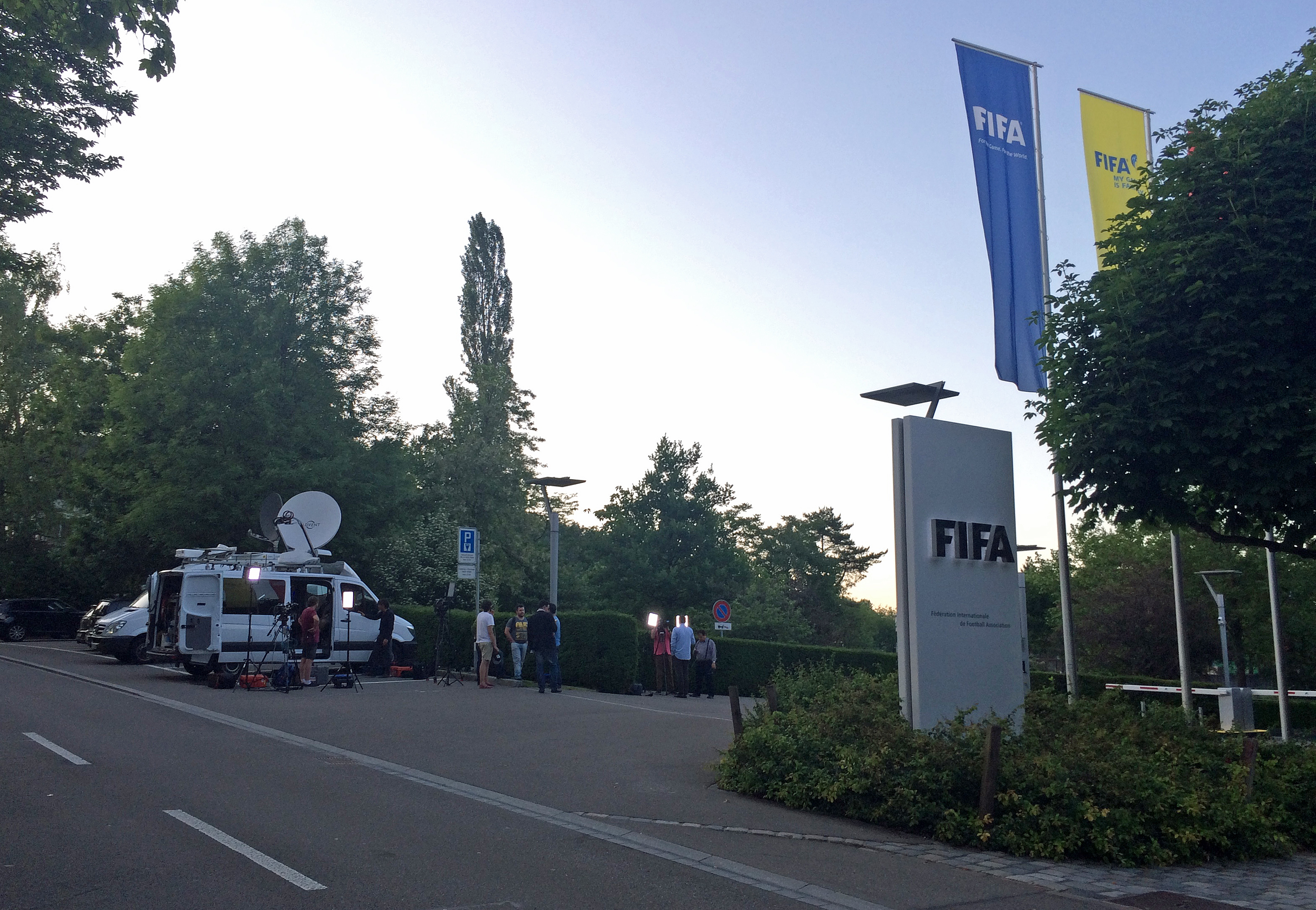
Media in front of FIFA headquarters after Blatter's resignation

On 29 May 2015, Sepp Blatter won re-election to the FIFA presidency at the 65th FIFA Congress in Zurich amid growing criticism over his position. Four days later, however, he announced that he would continue as president only until a new election would be conducted at a 2016 FIFA Extraordinary Congress on 26 February 2016. Blatter said that he would not be a candidate for election at that time. Blatter maintained "I did not resign, I put myself and my office in the hands of the FIFA congress."

Upon the decision of the FIFA Adjudicatory Chamber of the Independent Ethics Committee to provisionally ban Blatter, FIFA recognised Issa Hayatou as the interim president of FIFA in accordance with article 32 (6) of the FIFA Statutes.

==== Suspended World Cup bid ====
On 10 June 2015, FIFA announced that they would be delaying the 2026 FIFA World Cup bidding process, amidst allegations surrounding bribery in the 2018 and 2022 World Cup bidding processes. Secretary-general Valcke stated that "Due to the situation, I think it's nonsense to start any bidding process for the time being." Furthermore, FIFA announced the host selection for the 2026 World Cup would be postponed until 2020.

=== Convicted defendants ===
According to the US Department of Justice web site, the following defendants previously pleaded guilty under seal and agreed to forfeit more than $40 million.

- On 26 May 2015, Zorana Danis, the co-founder and owner of International Soccer Marketing Inc., a New Jersey–based sports marketing company, waived indictment and pleaded guilty to a two-count information charging her with wire fraud conspiracy and filing false tax returns. As part of her plea, Danis agreed to forfeit $2 million.
- On 9 November 2015, Fabio Tordin, the former CEO of Traffic Sports USA Inc. and currently an executive with Media World LLC, a Miami-based sports marketing company, waived indictment and pleaded guilty to a four-count information charging him with three counts of wire fraud conspiracy and one count of tax evasion. As part of his plea, Tordin agreed to forfeit more than $600,000.
- On 12 November 2015, Luis Bedoya, a member of the FIFA Executive Committee, a CONMEBOL vice president and the president of the Federación Colombiana de Fútbol, the Colombian soccer federation, waived indictment and pleaded guilty to a two-count information charging him with racketeering conspiracy and wire fraud conspiracy. As part of his plea, Bedoya agreed to forfeit all funds on deposit in his Swiss bank account, among other funds.
- On 16 November 2015, Alejandro Burzaco, the former general manager and chairman of the board of Torneos y Competencias S.A., an Argentinian sports marketing company, pleaded guilty to racketeering conspiracy, wire fraud conspiracy and money laundering conspiracy. As part of his plea, Burzaco agreed to forfeit more than $21.6 million.
- On 17 November 2015, Roger Huguet, the CEO of Media World and its parent company, waived indictment and pleaded guilty to a three-count information charging him with two counts of wire fraud conspiracy and one count of money laundering conspiracy. As part of his plea, Huguet agreed to forfeit more than $600,000.
- On 23 November 2015, Jeffrey Webb, a former FIFA vice president and executive committee member, CONCACAF president, Caribbean Football Union executive committee member and Cayman Islands Football Association president, pleaded guilty to racketeering conspiracy, three counts of wire fraud conspiracy and three counts of money laundering conspiracy. As part of his plea, Webb agreed to forfeit more than $6.7 million.
- On 23 November 2015, Sergio Jadue, a vice president of CONMEBOL and, until last month, the president of the Asociación Nacional de Fútbol Profesional de Chile, the Chilean soccer federation, waived indictment and pleaded guilty to a two-count information charging him with racketeering conspiracy and wire fraud conspiracy. As part of his plea, Jadue agreed to forfeit all funds on deposit in his U.S. bank account, among other funds.
- On 25 November 2015, José Margulies, the controlling principal of Valente Corp. and Somerton Ltd, who served as an intermediary who facilitated illicit payments between sports marketing executives and soccer officials, pleaded guilty to racketeering conspiracy, wire fraud conspiracy, and two counts of money laundering conspiracy. As part of his plea, Margulies agreed to forfeit more than $9.2 million.
- On 10 July 2018, US Imagina LLC, a Mediapro subsidiary, pleaded guilty to two counts of wire fraud conspiracy. The company was sentenced to pay $5,279,000 in criminal proceeds forfeited, $12,883,320 in criminal fines, and $6,655,000 in total restitution payments to affected soccer federations.

=== Governmental ===
- Australia – On 29 May 2015, the Australian Federal Police announced that it may investigate a $500,000 payment by Football Federation Australia (FFA) to Jack Warner, with the FFA stating that the payment was "mandatory" and part of their failed 2022 World Cup bid.
- Brazil – Senator and former Brazilian footballer Romário stated that "unfortunately, it wasn't our police that arrested them, but someone had to eventually arrest them one day". He has been an outspoken critic of the alleged corruption of FIFA.
- Colombia – The Office of the Attorney General of Colombia, through diplomatic cables, requested access to the investigation files in order to determine if any Colombian nationals are linked to the irregularities of FIFA, and also offered to aid the investigations if requested by United States prosecutors. In recent times, Colombia was selected by the FIFA to host the 2011 FIFA U-20 World Cup and the 2016 FIFA Futsal World Cup.
- Costa Rica – The Attorney General of Costa Rica opened a money laundering probe on Eduardo Li, stating that "even though most of the events took place outside of Costa Rica, it is our responsibility to follow up on that and find out if any crimes were committed here".
- Germany – Justice Minister Heiko Maas requested a full investigation on FIFA and stated that "it is clear that FIFA is not above the law either and that the accusations must be investigated. I think every football fan has a right to know that corruption in football and in international football has no room".
- Paraguay – The Foreign Ministry of Paraguay announced that they received an extradition request from the United States for Nicolás Leoz, and that they will forward the request to the Supreme Court of Justice for a further review. Also, the Senate approved on 11 June 2015, the repeal of a law granting immunity to the headquarters of CONMEBOL in order to gain access to the premises for investigation.
- Russia – At the end of May 2015, Russia's Ministry of Foreign Affairs condemned the arrest: "Without going into details about the charges that have been brought up, we point to the fact that this is another case of the illegal extraterritorial application of U.S. laws ... Once again, we urge Washington to stop trying to set itself up as a judge far outside its borders and to follow the generally accepted international legal procedures". Russia's president Vladimir Putin publicly said he saw the corruption investigations as an attempt by the U.S. to oust Sepp Blatter from his post as punishment for continuing to support Russia as host for the 2018 World Cup.
- Switzerland – Ueli Maurer, a member of the Swiss Federal Council, spoke at the opening of the FIFA Congress where he emphasised that Switzerland condemns any form of corruption. On 28 May, Maurer also said that FIFA is out of balance and in a need for action to restore its credibility. Calling for reform, he refused to scapegoat Blatter reminding some of his achievements for youth in football.
- United Kingdom – The Secretary of State for Culture, Media and Sport of the United Kingdom, John Whittingdale, stated that he fully supported The Football Association's position "that significant and wide-ranging reforms are urgently needed at the very top of FIFA, including a change in its leadership". Prime Minister David Cameron also backed calls for Blatter to quit as President of FIFA stating: "You cannot have accusations of corruption at this level and on this scale in this organisation and pretend that the person currently leading it is the right person to take it forward. That cannot be the case. Frankly, what we've seen is the ugly side of the beautiful game and he should go. And the sooner that happens the better – the faster that organisation can start to rebuild its credibility, which is going to be so important because so many people around the world want to see this game properly managed, properly looked after, so we can all enjoy the World Cups of the future."

=== Continental football organizations ===
- The AFC (Asia) stated that it is "against any form of corruption in football and fully supports any actions taken by the independent FIFA Ethics Committee where wrongdoing may have occurred, whether such actions affect Asian officials or otherwise." Moreover, it opposed postponing the FIFA Congress and reiterated its support for Blatter.
- CONCACAF (North America, Central America and Caribbean) stated that it "is deeply concerned by today's developments, in the arrest of several international football officials including those belonging to our Confederation. The Confederation will continue to cooperate with the authorities to its fullest capacity. At present, CONCACAF is not in a position to comment further on the specific allegations, which have been referred to the appropriate legal counsel through the pertinent channels. CONCACAF continues to operate in the ordinary course of business, hosting all of its upcoming tournaments in a successful and timely manner, including the 2015 CONCACAF Gold Cup."
- CONMEBOL (South America) – The South American Football Confederation issued a resolution to "repudiate all acts of corruption, and unreservedly support the investigations initiated toward FIFA, CONMEBOL, CONCACAF, and other organizations regarding alleged wrongdoing," and "will agree to collaborate openly and emphatically with such investigations."
- UEFA (Europe) stated: "[t]hese events show, once again, that corruption is deeply rooted in FIFA's culture. There is a need for the whole of FIFA to be 'rebooted' and for a real reform to be carried out." UEFA president Michel Platini explicitly demanded Blatter to step down before his re-election.

=== National football federations ===
- Costa Rica – Rodolfo Villalobos, the next in line for the presidency of the Costa Rican Football Federation, and with the backing of its other board members, announced that he would not vote for Blatter as a result of the ongoing revelations.
- England – David Gill, as the newly elected British FIFA Vice-president and FIFA Executive Committee board member, threatened to resign his role if Sepp Blatter was re-elected as FIFA President for a fifth term in protest at his leadership following the corruption scandal. Blatter was re-elected, and Gill immediately rejected his position in protest, saying "I simply do not see how there will be change for the good of world football while Mr Blatter remains in post." After Blatter resigned on 2 June 2015, Gill announced that he would "reconsider [his] position", since he had "yet to confirm formally [his] resignation", and followed this up by saying "I am more than willing to play my part in helping to bring about a positive future for FIFA and to work with the many people within the organisation who are only committed to developing and promoting the game around the world."
- Guinea-Bissau – Manuel Nascimento Lopes, the president of the Football Federation of Guinea-Bissau, said that "I'm a Christian and this is blasphemy" in response to people blaming Blatter for the actions of other people. Lopes also said that "It's a state conspiracy. People are always trying to knock Blatter. Africa will vote for Mr. Blatter and I will follow that. I agree at some point there has to be change but let Blatter finish his mandate and see what he does."
- Ireland – The Football Association of Ireland's chief executive John Delaney, speaking on national radio after Blatter's resignation, recalled: "In 2009, when Blatter insulted Ireland in the aftermath of the Thierry Henry handball incident I called him an embarrassment to FIFA and to himself. He called me over about that, across the table like I am talking to you, with one or two expletives. That was in a room. He said, 'No-one speaks to me like that', and I said, 'well I do' and that was that." In 2009, Delaney said of the handball incident, "It's not about money. This is about sporting integrity." In June 2015, Delaney confirmed that FIFA gave the FAI a "loan" of €5 million which was in effect a payment not to proceed with legal action over the handball decision and consequent elimination from the 2010 FIFA World Cup. The loan was written off in 2014.
- South Africa – Danny Jordaan, the head of the South African Football Association, admitted to paying $10 million to a football body led by Jack Warner in 2008, but denied that it was a bribe for hosting the 2010 FIFA World Cup.
- United States – The North American Soccer League Board of Governors suspended chairman Aaron Davidson and business relations with Traffic Sports. Carolina RailHawks, a team owned by Traffic Sports, was allowed to "continue to operate in the ordinary course of business".

=== FIFA sponsors ===
In October 2015, four major FIFA sponsors, Coca-Cola, McDonald's, Visa and Budweiser, called for Blatter to stand down immediately as FIFA president.

=== Corporate consequences ===
The FIFA corruption scandal had significant long-term impacts on Mediapro beyond the immediate legal penalties. The scandal contributed to the company's failed €814 million contract with French Ligue 1 in 2020, forcing Mediapro to pay €100 million in penalties and resulting in the shutdown of its Téléfoot channel. Parent company Imagina Media implemented enhanced compliance programs, terminated all implicated executives, and hired new management for US operations following the 2018 guilty plea. As of 2024, Gerard Romy remains wanted as a fugitive by US authorities.

=== Interpol ===
On 12 June 2015, an international law enforcement agency Interpol announced it was suspending a 20 million euro donation by FIFA to fund an anti-gambling and match-fixing program. Four million euros were spent in the first two years on prevention and education and another 1.5 million euros was set to be spent in the remaining eight years.

An Interpol spokesman said, "The agreement with FIFA includes a clause which states that 'the Funding Party declares notably that its activities are compatible with the principles, aims and activities of Interpol'. All external partners, whether public or private, must share the fundamental values and principles of the organisation, as well as the wider law enforcement community."

FIFA said it was disappointed by the decision.

The donation for the 10-year Integrity in Sport program was originally accepted in 2011 by former Interpol Secretary-General Ronald Noble.

== Recovery and redistribution of forfeited funds ==
In August 2021, the United States Department of Justice approved the return of more than US$201 million in forfeited assets to football organisations affected by the corruption schemes. The beneficiaries included FIFA, CONCACAF, CONMEBOL and several national football federations. An initial distribution of approximately $32.3 million was approved as part of the process. The funds had been recovered through criminal forfeiture proceedings arising from the investigation into bribery and other offences involving football officials and sports marketing executives.

On 30 June 2022, the Department of Justice announced a further distribution of approximately $92 million. FIFA, CONCACAF and CONMEBOL committed to directing the recovered money through the World Football Remission Fund, established under the FIFA Foundation. The fund was intended to support women's and girls' football, educational initiatives, safeguarding, youth programmes, community outreach and humanitarian projects. Its arrangements included independent auditing and oversight measures intended to ensure that the recovered assets were distributed appropriately.

== See also ==
- 2014 protests in Brazil: pointing and partially caused by perceived injustices around the 2014 FIFA World Cup
- 2015 Greek football scandal
- 2018 FIFA World Cup controversies
- ChangeFIFA
- International Sport and Leisure
- JTA Supermarkets
- United Passions
- El Presidente
