= Julio Rocha =

Julio Rocha may refer to:

- Julio Rocha López (1950–2018), Nicaraguan football administrator
- Júlio Rocha (born 1979), Brazilian actor
