= Mariano Jinkis =

Argentine businessman

- Born: 23 September 1974 (age 52); Argentina
- Parent: Hugo Jinkis

Mariano Jinkis (born 23 September 1974) is an Argentine businessman, the son of Hugo Jinkis, CEO and owner of Full Play Group, a football broadcasting rights company.

Interpol released a red notice (a form of "wanted" advertisement) concerning him, for his alleged participation in issues related with bribes. He and his father have appeared in front of the authorities and is sought by the United States on charges of conspiracy to commit the offenses of racketeering, wire fraud, and money laundering.

Jinkis and his father were allegedly involved in the 2015 FIFA corruption case.

In August 2015, Federal Judge Claudio Bonadio ordered that Hugo and Mariano Jinkis be released from prison on condition that they remain not more than 60 km from the court, and that neither can leave their home for more than 24 hours without notifying the judicial authorities.

Between 2010 and 2014 Jinkis Full Play Group paid more than 53 bribes totaling more than $14.02 million to Bedoya, Chiriboğa, Esquivel and Figueredo. They were used to secure marketing rights for the Copa America in 2015, 2016, 2019 and 2023. The transactions were concealed through bank accounts held by subsidiaries Cross Trading and Yorkfields. The Israeli Bank Hapoalim paid over $30 million as penalty for laundering more than $20 million bribes to soccer officials.

The trial has not been completed yet.
