= Alfredo Hawit =

Honduran lawyer and footballer (born 1951)

Professor Alfredo Hawit
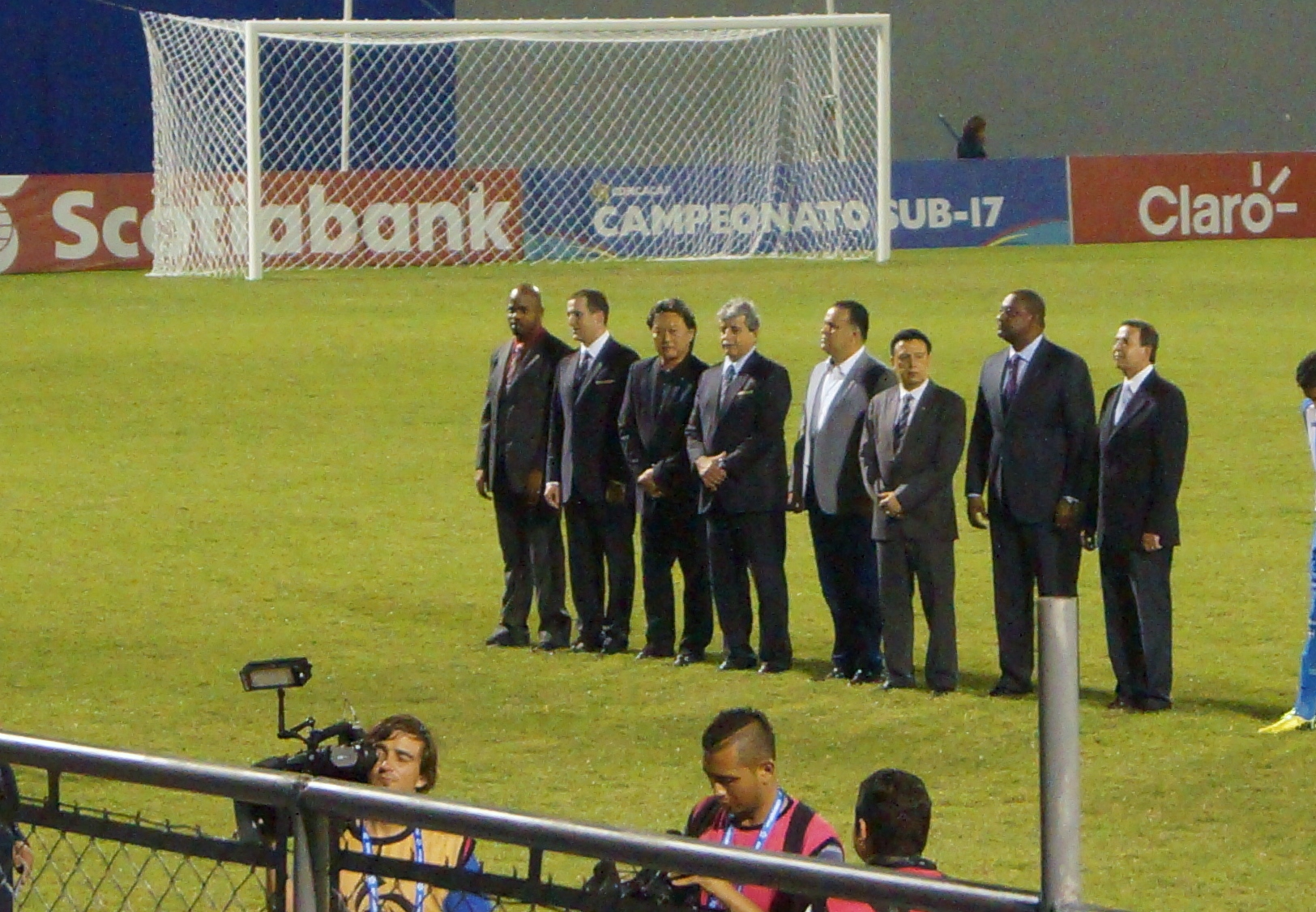

CONCACAF president
- In office 27 May 2015 – 12 May 2016
- Preceded by: Jeffrey Webb
- Succeeded by: Victor Montagliani
- In office 4 June 2011 – 22 May 2012
- Preceded by: Lisle Austin
- Succeeded by: Jeffrey Webb

Personal details
- Born: Alfredo Hawit Banegas; 8 October 1951 (age 75)
- Spouse: María del Carmen Asfura
- Education: Universidad Nacional Autónoma de Honduras
- Profession: Lawyer
Association football career
- Position: Midfielder
Senior career*
Years	Team	Apps	(Gls)
1967–1970	Progreso		(2)
1974–1976	Olimpia		(8)
1976–1977	Motagua		(1)
- * Club domestic league appearances and goals

Alfredo Hawit Banegas (born 8 October 1951) is a Honduran lawyer and former footballer. He is the head of the National Autonomous Federation of Football of Honduras and was made the interim head of CONCACAF on 4 June 2011.

== Club career ==
As a player, he played professional football for Honduran club sides Progreso, Club Deportivo Olimpia and F.C. Motagua. He scored 11 goals for them altogether. He is one of only few Honduran players who made his debut for a senior side, aged only 15.

== Football Federation Career ==
Hawit, having seen Jack Warner's reign as CONCACAF President last twenty one years, proposed that the CONCACAF president should be able to serve only one four year-term at a time and for the Caribbean Football Union, UNCAF and North American Football Union to nominate the president on a rotary basis. He was an interim president of CONCACAF.

After the arrest of Jeffrey Webb on 27 May 2015, Hawit was made president of CONCACAF. Hawit himself was then arrested on corruption charges on 3 Dec 2015 in the Baur au Lac hotel in Zürich. On 4 December 2015 he was banned for 90 days by the FIFA Ethics Committee. Hawit was found guilty of four conspiracy counts in the sweeping FIFA bribery scandal in April 2016.

In December 2016, the FIFA Ethics Committee banned Hawit for life from all football-related activities.

== Personal life ==
Hawit is one of six children of Alfredo Hawit and Emilia Banegas. He spend his childhood in El Progreso, Honduras. He is married to María del Carmen Asfura.
