= Danny Jordaan =

President of the South African Football Association

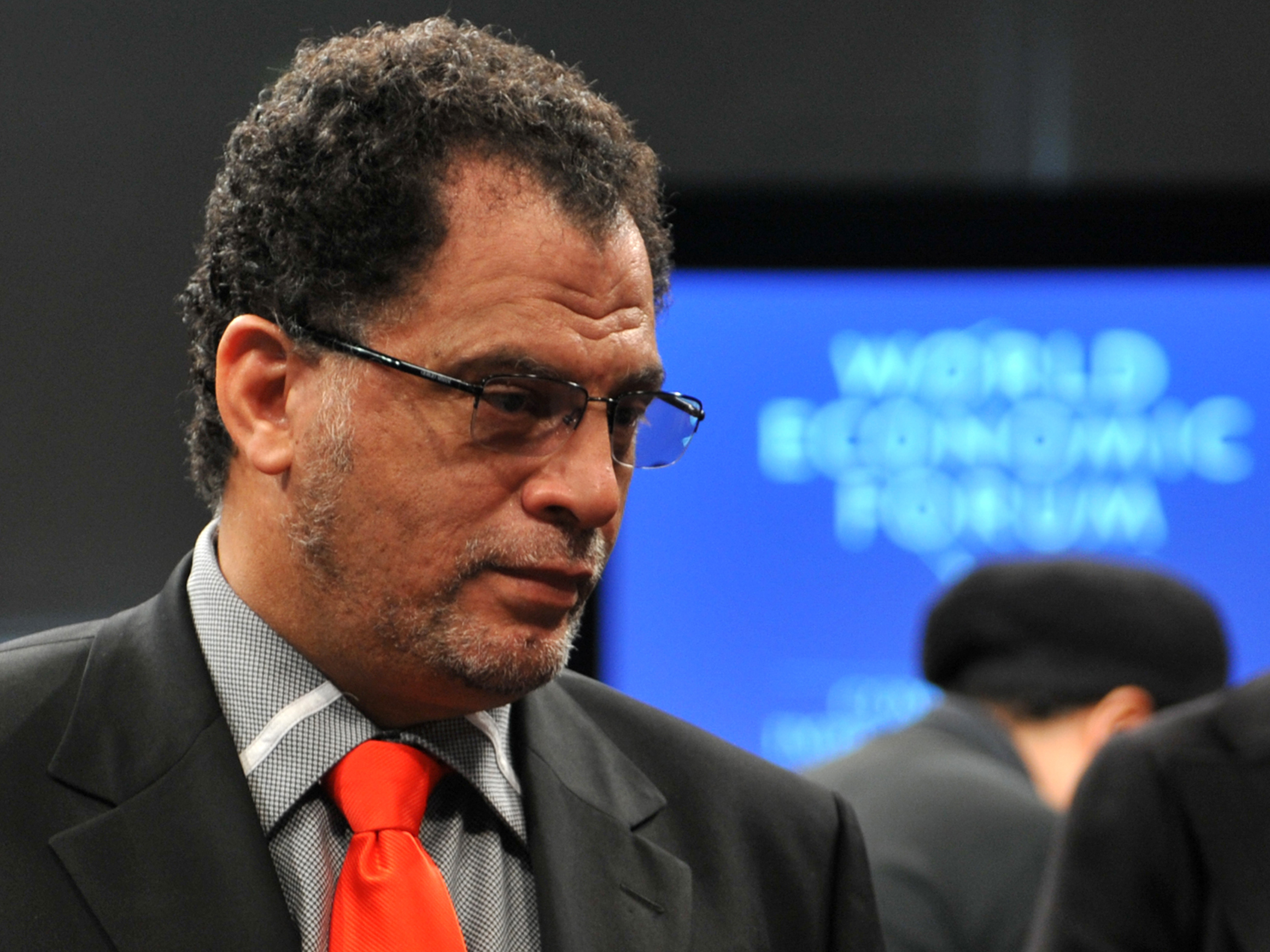
- Jordaan attending the 2009 World Economic Forum on Africa

Mayor of Nelson Mandela Bay
- In office 18 May 2015 – 18 August 2016
- Preceded by: Benson Fihla
- Succeeded by: Athol Trollip

Member of the Parliament of South Africa from Eastern Cape
- In office 1994–1997

Personal details
- Born: Daniel Alexander Jordaan; 3 September 1951 (age 74) Port Elizabeth, Cape Province, South Africa
- Party: African National Congress
- Occupation: Anti-apartheid activist, lawyer, lecturer, football administrator

Daniel Alexander "Danny" Jordaan (born 3 September 1951) is the president of the South African Football Association (SAFA). He is a former lecturer, politician and anti-apartheid activist. He led South Africa's successful 2010 FIFA World Cup bid, the first successful one for Africa, as well as the country's unsuccessful bid four years earlier for the 2006 FIFA World Cup, and was the chief executive officer of the 2010 FIFA World Cup South Africa. He is also the former Mayor of the Nelson Mandela Bay Metropolitan Municipality, having served from May 2015 until August 2016.

He has served FIFA in numerous capacities, including, as a General Co-ordinator for the Youth World Cup (now FIFA U-20 World Cup), 2001 FIFA Confederations Cup and the 2002 FIFA World Cup in Korea/Japan. He was also a match commissioner for the 2006 FIFA World Cup and a member of the 2006 FIFA World Cup Organising Committee. He served on the 2010 FIFA World Cup Organising Committee and 2009 FIFA Confederations Cup Organising Committee.

Jordaan is also a member of the International Marketing Council.

== Career ==
Danny Jordaan was born in Port Elizabeth to Maxine and Alexandre Jordaan. He became involved in anti-apartheid activities by joining the South African Students' Organisation (SASO) in the early 1970s, an organisation founded by Steve Biko in order to defend the rights of black students. Later, Jordaan also became a member of the United Democratic Front and the African National Congress (ANC).

Following his studies, Jordaan became a teacher in 1974. From 1970 to 1983 he was a provincial cricket and football player. In the latter sport, he achieved professional status for a brief period. His political and sport interests soon combined and he became an activist in various organizations fighting to break down racial barriers in sport.

From 1983 to 1992 he served as the president or vice-president of various football boards. In 1993, he was appointed as a director of the Cape Town Olympic Bid Company.

His political career also progressed; in 1990 he was elected as the chairperson of the ANC branch in Port Elizabeth North. After the first fully inclusive South African elections in 1994, he became a member of parliament for the ANC under the newly elected Nelson Mandela, a position he held until 1997.

In 1997, he was elected as the chief executive officer of SAFA. He subsequently headed South Africa's unsuccessful 2006 FIFA World Cup bid, narrowly losing to Germany but gaining great respect internationally for his work. As a consequence, he also led South Africa's 2010 FIFA World Cup bid, this time successfully.

Jordaan has served on the marketing and television board of FIFA since 1998.

On 28 September 2013, Jordaan was elected as the new president of South African Football Association (SAFA), succeeding Kirsten Nematandani. He was elected ahead of Mandla Mazibuko by 162 to 88 votes from 52 regions.

In light of the 2015 FIFA corruption case, Jordaan admitted to paying $10 Million to a football body led by Jack Warner in 2008, but denied that it was a bribe for hosting the 2010 FIFA World Cup.

On 13 November 2024, Jordaan was arrested on suspicion of embezzling R1.3 million ($72,372) of SAFA's funds to hire public relations and security firms for personal use.

== Education ==
Jordaan has a BA degree from the University of the Western Cape and an honours degree from the University of South Africa.

== Awards ==
He received a special presidential award from President Nelson Mandela in 1994 as well as the presidential sport achievement award from President Thabo Mbeki in 2001. He won South Africa's marketing person of the year award in 2000. In 2004, he was voted 44th in the Top 100 Great South Africans and newsmaker of the year. He received a mayoral award from the mayor of Los Angeles, California on 24 October 2004. That same year, he won the Confederation of African Football's "most impressive Achiever" alongside Molefi Oliphant and Irvin Khosa. He was awarded the Order of Ikhamanga in Gold in 2011 for ensuring that South Africa hosted a successful 2010 FIFA World Cup.

Jordaan has been given the freedom of the city of Maracaibo, Venezuela. He has also received numerous awards from other South African cities.

He has received four honorary doctorates from: Nelson Mandela Metropolitan University (D.Phil); the University of South Africa (D. Admin); his alma mater, the University of the Western Cape (D. Phil); and in May 2015 from the University of Fort Hare (D. Admin).

== Rape allegations ==
In November 2017, Jordaan issued a statement through his attorney to deny allegations by singer and former parliamentarian Jennifer Ferguson that he had raped her 24 years before. Ferguson first posted her allegations on Facebook in October, saying she had been inspired to do so by the #MeToo campaign. Ferguson later accused lawyer Norman Arendse of fishing for information that could be used to discredit her, on Jordaan's behalf. Arendse denied both claims. An allegation that Jordaan had failed to act against an employee who had been accused of rape had been made in the week following Ferguson's allegation by an anonymous source but the claim was refuted by SAFA. Until Jordaan's statement, some South African publications refused to name him, even as others did. In April 2018 Jordaan through his attorney called on the South African Police Service to expedite their investigation so that the truth could be revealed. He again denied the allegations. Some media questioned whether the rape allegations were part of a political plot to discredit Jordaan ahead of the highly contested SAFA elections that were due to take place in March 2018. Jordaan was widely expected to be unanimously reelected President of the body that administers football in the country.

Sporting positions
Preceded by Franz Beckenbauer	FIFA World Cup Chief Organizer; 2010-2010; With: Irvin Khoza	Succeeded by José Maria Marin
Preceded by	President of South African Football Association; 2013-	Incumbent
Political offices
Preceded by Benson Fihla	Mayor of Nelson Mandela Bay Metropolitan Municipality; 2015-2016	Succeeded by Athol Trollip
