= Lisle Austin =

Barbadian football official (1936–2021)

President of CONCACAF
- In office 30 May 2011 – 4 June 2011
- Preceded by: Jack Warner
- Succeeded by: Alfredo Hawit

Personal details
- Born: Lisle Austin; 26 April 1936 Barbados
- Died: 5 December 2021 (aged 85)

Lisle Austin (26 April 1936 – 5 December 2021) was the President of the Barbados Football Association. Austin was also the President of CONCACAF for a few days in 2011 before being suspended.

== Career ==
Austin was appointed temporary President of CONCACAF on 30 May 2011, in place of Jack Warner after Warner's suspension from football activities. On the day of his appointment, Austin attempted to remove Chuck Blazer from his position as General Secretary of CONCACAF. However, he was informed by a majority of the executive committee that he lacked any authority to do so.

In response, Austin suggested that Article 29 of CONCACAF's statutes, which states that the President is the "judicial and extrajudicial" representative of the Confederation, somehow provided him the authority to hire and fire the General Secretary. However, Article 28(c) of CONCACAF's statutes states that it is the Executive Committee's responsibility to "appoint the General Secretary."

Austin died on 5 December 2021, at the age of 85.

== Suspension and ban ==
A majority of the executive committee responded to Austin's assertion of authority by suspending him, stating that he was being "banned from all football activities within CONCACAF and at the national level ... for apparent infringement of the CONCACAF Statutes."

The removal of Austin and his predecessor Jack Warner caused a divide between some of the Caribbean Football Union nations and the North and Central American nations. Lisle took out an injunction in a Bahamian court where Judge Stephen Isaacs attempted to prohibit CONCACAF “from interfering with Lisle Austin in the discharge of his duties as acting president”.

In its official response to Austin's attempt to overrule the CONCACAF Executive by means of a civil injunction, FIFA's Disciplinary Committee banned Austin from any participation in football for one year, and until he withdrew his legal plea from the Bahamian court.

== See also ==
- 2015 FIFA corruption case
