= Jaime Baeza =

Chilean footballer

President of the ANFP
- In office 12 November 2015 – 4 January 2016
- Preceded by: Sergio Jadue
- Succeeded by: Arturo Salah

Personal details
- Born: 28 February 1962 (age 64) Santiago, Chile
- Education: University of Valparaíso (BA)
- Occupation: Footballer; Leader
- Profession: Business administrator
Association football career
- Position: Striker
Senior career*
| Years | Team | Apps | (Gls) |
| 1980−1985 | Everton | | |
| 1987 | Rangers | | |
| 1988−1989 | Huachipato | | |
| 1990 | Naval | | |
| 1991−1994 | Everton | | |
| 1993 | → Melipilla (loan) | | |
International career^{‡}
| 1984 | Chile U23 | 0 | (0) |
- * Club domestic league appearances and goals as of 11 December 2021 ‡ National team caps and goals as of 11 December 2021

Jaime Orlando Baeza Zet (born 28 February 1962) is a Chilean former footballer.

For two and half months, Baeza was caretaker president of the ANFP after Sergio Jadue's resignation.
