= Manuel Burga Seoane =

Lawyer and former soccer manager

President of the Peruvian Football Federation
- In office 2002–2014

Personal details
- Born: October 13, 1957 (age 68) Chiclayo, Peru
- Spouse: María Elena Acha Puertas

Manuel Burga Seoane (born October 13, 1957) is a Peruvian lawyer and former soccer manager. He was president of the Peruvian Football Federation (FPF) from 2002 until 2014.

== Early life and education ==
In 1987, Burga graduated as a lawyer and became a manager of the Metropolitan Soccer Region in 1990. In 1991, he was appointed interim president of the FPF, but resigned on February 7, 1992, just 35 days after his appointment.

== Career ==
On 4 October 2002, Burga was elected president of the FPF. In 2007 Manuel he was reelected as president of the FPF. On 17 December 2010, Burga was reelected as president of the FPF for a third period. In October 2014, Burga announced his candidacy for a fourth term, but he got disqualified because of growing criticism.

== Corruption allegations ==
On 21 August 2008, the National Police's Financial Investigation Department reported “indications and evidence” of irregular income. Renzo Reggiardo then opened an investigation against Burga, which was dropped at the request of prosecutor Jorge Sanz Quiroz.

In July 2015, a preliminary fiscal report of the Congressional Oversight Commission revealed that real estate and assets were signed over to family members of Burga and that he had no assets running through his name.

In December 2015, Burga has been arrested as part of an investigation into corruption at FIFA.

In 2020, prosecutor Angélica Ávila Cancho started the investigation against Burga's wife María Elena Acha Puertas for her role in alleged crime of money laundering.

On 4 April 2023, FIFA said Burga had been banned from all football-related activities for life for participating in bribery schemes.
