= Hugo Jinkis =

Argentine businessman

- Born: 9 May 1945 (age 81); Buenos Aires, Argentina
- Children: Mariano Jinkis

Hugo Jinkis (born 9 May 1945) is an Argentine businessman, the CEO and owner of Full Play Group, a football broadcasting rights company.

Interpol released a red notice (a form of "wanted" advertisement) concerning him, for his alleged participation in issues related with bribes. He has appeared in front of the authorities and is sought by the United States on charges of conspiracy to commit the offenses of racketeering, wire fraud, and money laundering.

Jinkis was allegedly involved, along with his son, Mariano Jinkis, in the 2015 FIFA corruption case.

In August 2015, Federal Judge Claudio Bonadio ordered that Hugo and Mariano Jinkis be released from prison on condition that they remain not more than 60 km from the court, and that neither can leave their home for more than 24 hours without notifying the judicial authorities.

The Full Play Group of Jinkis and his son Mariano had bank accounts in the names of Bayan Group, Cross Trading and Yorkfields. Between 2010 and 2014 Jinkins used these accounts to pay at least 53 bribes to FIFA leaders Bedoya, Chiriboğa, Esquivel and Figueredo. Following the bribes, totaling more than $14.02 million, Full Play acquired the Copa America marketing rights for 2015, 2016, 2019 and 2023. In 2020, one of the financial traders, Hapoalim Bank, an Israeli bank and its Swiss subsidiary, agreed to pay more than $30 million for its role in the laundering of more than $20 million in bribes to soccer officials.

Full Play Group’s criminal in New York was ongoing in November 2020.
