= Brayan Jiménez =

Guatemalan Dental Surgeon

Brayan Jiménez Hernández (June 8, 1954) is a Guatemalan dental surgeon, former president of the Guatemala football federation and former member of the FIFA Committee for Fair Play and Social Responsibility.

== FIFA's fraud case ==
Jiménez was among several officials who were indicted for bribery and corruption in the 2015 FIFA corruption case. Between 2009 and 2015 he violated six articles of FIFA's code of ethics. Specifically, he was asked by sports marketing companies to give him large amounts of money for the purpose of awarding television and sponsorship rights for World Cup qualifiers in Central America and for Guatemala's participation in international friendly matches. This resulted in a lifetime ban from all football-related activities at the national and international level.
