= Carlos Chávez (football administrator) =

Bolivian football administrator (1958–2018)

- Born: Carlos Alberto Chávez Landívar; 26 November 1958
- Died: 3 August 2018 (aged 59)

Carlos Alberto Chávez Landívar (26 November 1958 – 3 August 2018) was a Bolivian business executive who was the head of the Bolivian Football Federation, and former treasurer of CONMEBOL. He was arrested in July 2015, as part of the 2015 FIFA corruption case, and stands accused of "alleged corruption in the management of resources".

He is also accused of profiting from the disgrace of the death of a young Bolivian fan (Kevin Douglas Beltrán Espada).
