= José Hawilla =

Brazilian businessman

- Born: 11 July 1943; São José do Rio Preto, São Paulo, Brazil
- Died: 25 May 2018 (aged 74); São Paulo, Brazil
- Occupation: Businessman
- Criminal charges: Money laundering, racketeering, and wire fraud
- Criminal status: Guilty plea

José Hawilla (11 July 1943 – 25 May 2018) was a Brazilian businessman, the owner and founder of Traffic Group, a multinational sports marketing conglomerate.

== Biography ==
Hawilla was born in São José do Rio Preto to parents of Lebanese origin, in the state of São Paulo, and began his career as a sports journalist. In 1980, Hawilla founded the Traffic Group, Brazil's largest sports marketing company. He died in a São Paulo hospital on 25 May 2018 at the age of 74 of respiratory failure. He had been ill with pulmonary hypertension, fibrosis, emphysema and throat cancer.

== 2015 FIFA corruption case ==
Hawilla pleaded guilty on 12 December 2014 to "corruption charges including racketeering, wire fraud and money laundering", in connection with what has become the 2015 FIFA corruption case. Hawilla agreed to forfeit $151 million, of which $25 million was paid in December 2014.

== In popular culture ==
Argentine actor Jean Pierre Noher portrayed Hawilla in the 2020 Amazon Prime Video original series El Presidente.
