= Full Play Group =

- Industry: Media
- Founded: 1998; 27 years ago in Argentina
- Founder: Hugo Jinkis
- Headquarters: Uruguay
- Key people: Hugo Jinkis (CEO until 2015)
- Website: fullplaygroup.com

Full Play Group is an Argentinian sports media rights company.

Full Play holds the broadcasting rights for most South American teams and some of the CONCACAF teams.

Hugo Jinkis, the owner and former CEO, was arrested along with his son, Mariano Jinkis, on 27 May 2015 in connection with the 2015 FIFA corruption case.

All of the directors resigned in August 2015, and new directors were appointed.
