= Chuck Blazer =

American soccer administrator (1945–2017)

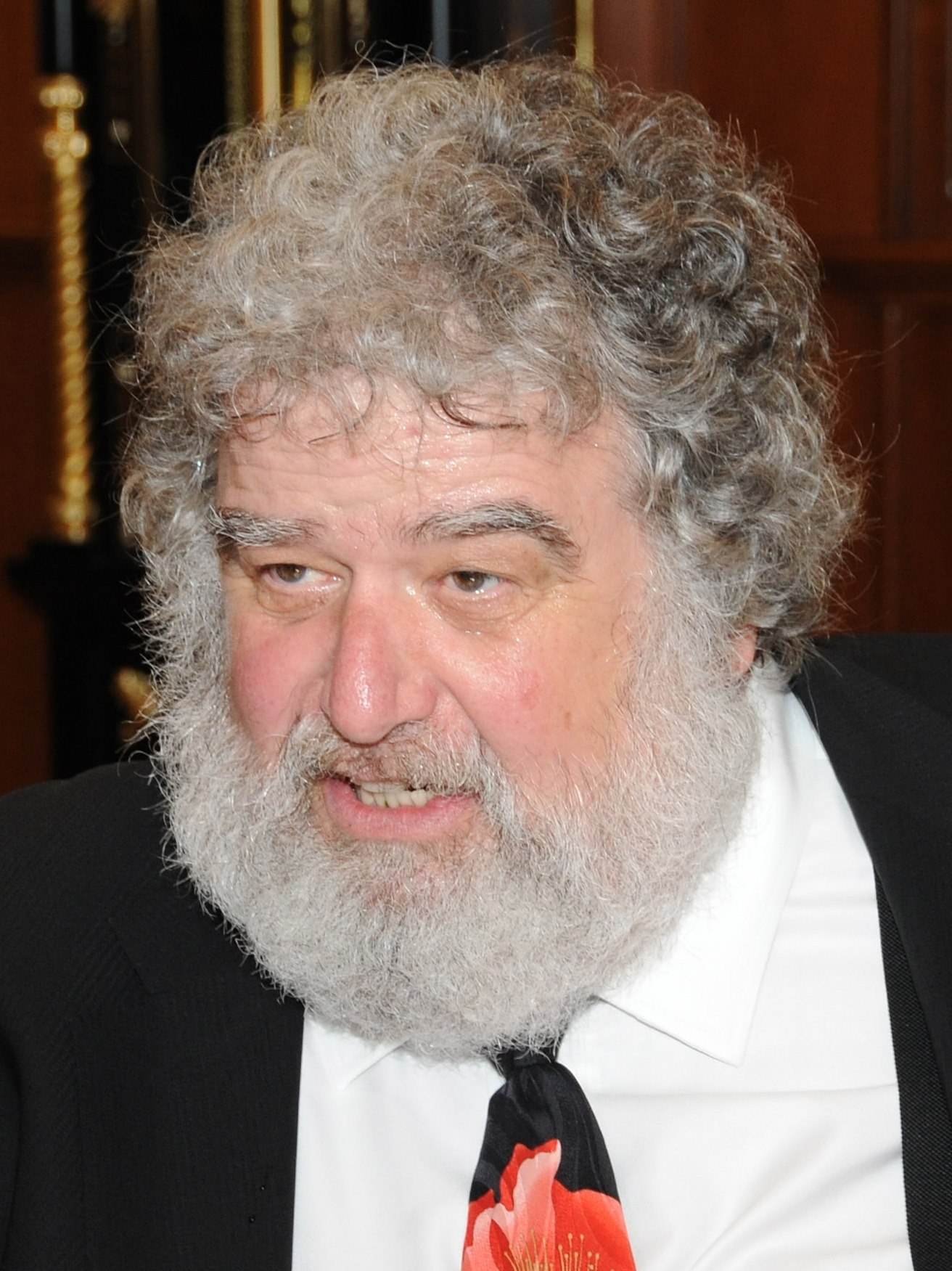
- Blazer in 2010
- Born: Charles Gordon Blazer; April 26, 1945; New York City, U.S.
- Died: July 12, 2017 (aged 72); New Jersey, U.S.
- Education: New York University
- Occupation: Soccer administrator
- Years active: 1990–2013
- Organizations: FIFA Executive Committee (1996–2013); CONCACAF General Secretary (1990–2011); U.S. Soccer Federation Executive Vice President
- Known for: Lead informant in the 2015 FIFA corruption case
- Criminal charges: Income tax evasion, money laundering, racketeering, and wire fraud
- Criminal penalty: $1.9 million restitution, lifetime ban from FIFA
- Criminal status: Guilty

Charles Gordon Blazer (April 26, 1945 – July 12, 2017) was an American soccer administrator, who held a number of high level positions before becoming a government informant on widespread corruption within organized soccer and subsequently being banned by FIFA in 2015. He was a FIFA Executive Committee member from 1996 to 2013, the CONCACAF general secretary from 1990 to 2011, and executive vice president of the U.S. Soccer Federation.

In 2013, Blazer admitted to conspiring with other FIFA executive committee members to accept bribes in conjunction with the failed bid of Morocco and the successful bid of South Africa to become World Cup hosts in 1998 and 2010, respectively. His admissions came during testimony given at a sealed sentencing proceeding in a New York federal court.

== Early life ==
Blazer grew up in a middle-class New York City Jewish family in the borough of Queens, where his father ran a stationery and newspaper shop. He attended Forest Hills High School and then took an accountancy degree at New York University. After graduating, he enrolled at NYU's Stern School of Business but did not complete his MBA. He then spent a number of years selling promotional and marketing items; a first success was supplying buttons for the Smiley craze in the 1970s. When his son started playing youth soccer in Westchester County, New York, in 1976, Blazer started coaching the team even though he had never played the game. He is remembered as a skillful and active administrator, more interested in organizing than coaching. He advanced in youth soccer administration up to the Eastern New York State Soccer Association.

== Career ==
In 1984, persuading Pelé to campaign for him, he was elected to the United States Soccer Federation as executive vice president in charge of international competition. In the next two years the U.S. men's soccer team played 19 matches, having played only two in the two years before Blazer's election. While with U.S. soccer, Blazer played a central role in the decision to make the successful bid for the 1994 World Cup. Also during this time, the U.S. women's soccer team was formed. Blazer's position gave him a seat on the board of CONCACAF, where he met Jack Warner. In 1986, after failing to win re-election, he co-founded the American Soccer League, running it from his home. Blazer was forced out by the owners, who felt they had been kept in the dark about finances, within two years. He became president of the Miami Sharks, taking control of the finances, but left precipitously after five months, in May 1989.

In 1989, Blazer convinced Jack Warner to run for CONCACAF president. Blazer managed Warner's successful campaign and was then appointed General Secretary. He was the General Secretary of CONCACAF from 1990 until 2011. He was a member of the FIFA Executive Committee from 1996 to April 2013, when Sunil Gulati was elected to replace him.

== Corruption allegations and conviction ==
In May 2011, in response to allegations of bribery made by national representatives attending a May 10 meeting of the Caribbean Football Union (CFU), Blazer initiated an investigation of AFC President Mohammed bin Hammam and FIFA Vice President Jack Warner. The investigation was conducted by John P. Collins, former United States federal prosecutor and FIFA Legal Committee member. Its submission led to FIFA's May 29, 2011, suspension of Warner and Bin Hammam from all soccer activities, pending the outcome of FIFA's own investigation and procedures. Acting CONCACAF president Lisle Austin attempted to fire Blazer five days later, but the action was blocked by the CONCACAF executive committee. On June 15, 2011, Blazer was questioned by the FIFA Ethics Committee.

On August 14, 2011, journalist Andrew Jennings reported in the British newspaper The Independent that the FBI was examining documentary evidence revealing confidential soccer payments to offshore accounts operated by Blazer. Blazer began working undercover for the FBI in December 2011.

On April 19, 2013, Blazer and Jack Warner were accused of massive fraud during their years as CONCACAF executives. A forensic audit by the organization's Integrity Committee determined that both men had functioned without a written contract from 1998 until their respective departures, and that Blazer had received US$15 million in commissions for his services during that timeframe. An anonymous government source expected that an ongoing FBI investigation into Blazer's finances would be expanded significantly and joined by the IRS. In May 2013, Blazer was suspended for 90 days.

On November 1, 2014, it was reported by the New York Daily News that Blazer had been a confidential informant for the FBI and the IRS, and recorded key meetings between executives for FIFA and for the 2012 Summer Olympics. Blazer had been compelled to inform for the FBI and IRS after they uncovered more than a decade of unpaid taxes on hidden, multimillion-dollar incomes. On May 27, 2015, several FIFA officials were arrested in Zurich, with Blazer having been a key cooperating witness in the investigation that led to the arrests. Blazer pleaded guilty to charges that included racketeering, wire fraud, income tax evasion, and money laundering. Blazer died before being sentenced, after sentencing was delayed by the decisions of his co-defendants to go to trial.

On June 3, 2015, the transcript of a closed sentencing proceeding in the U.S. District Court for the Eastern District of New York on November 25, 2013 was unsealed and made public. In his 2013 testimony, Blazer admitted to conspiring with other FIFA Executive Committee members to accept bribes in conjunction with the selection of 1998 and 2010 World Cup hosts. On July 9, 2015, Blazer was banned for life from all soccer-related activity by FIFA.

== Personal life ==
Blazer married Susan Aufox in 1965; they had one daughter and one son together and later divorced. He had two apartments on the 49th floor of Trump Tower – one for himself and one allegedly for his cats.

== Death ==
Blazer died on July 12, 2017, at a New Jersey hospital at the age of 72. At the time of his death, he had colorectal cancer, coronary artery disease and diabetes.
