= Eduardo Deluca =

Argentinian football administrator

Eduardo Deluca is an Argentinian association football administrator, the former secretary general of CONMEBOL, until he left on health grounds in 2011.

In December 2015, Deluca was one of sixteen further FIFA officials indicted for racketeering, wire fraud and money laundering. In 2019, Deluca was banned from any football activity for life.

In April 2016, Deluca was named in the Panama Papers.
