= José Margulies =

Brazilian businessman and criminal

José Lázaro Margulies (born 12 August 1939), is a Brazilian businessman who was convicted of organized crime, money laundering and fraud charges relating to the 2015 FIFA corruption case.

== Early life ==
José Margulies was born in Buenos Aires, Argentina and immigrated to Brazil at a young age, where he worked for more than twenty years managing sales and marketing rights related to sports competitions.

== FIFA's fraud case ==
In May 2015, Margulies was one of the FIFA executives accused by the FBI of various corruption offenses during the 2015 FIFA corruption case, which led to the arrest of executives by Swiss police at the Hotel Baur au Lac in Zürich.

On June 2, 2015, Interpol issued an arrest warrant against Margulies and other FIFA businessmen and executives involved in the FIFA's corruption case who had fled justice.

In November 2015, Margulies was convicted of organized crime, money laundering and fraud. He agreed to forfeit more than $9.2 million.

In April 2016, a U.S. Federal Court released Margulies's November 2015 testimony in which he pleaded guilty to corruption and agreed with the prosecution about fining and recovering millions of dollars. José Margulies acknowledged his role as an intermediary in transfers of bribe money to sports executives.

In January 2020, Margulies was sentenced by the Eastern District Court of New York to a two-year probationary period. Judge Pamela K. Chen stated that Margulies had committed a serious crime and that this had contributed to questioning the credibility of professional football, but considered it a mitigating circumstance to repent of his deed and to cooperate with the court.
