= Phaedra Al-Majid =

Qatari whistleblower

Phaedra Al-Majid (Arabic: فيدرا الماجد) is a Qatari whistleblower and former media officer of the Qatar 2022 FIFA World Cup bid.
