= Eduardo Li =

Costa Rican football administrator

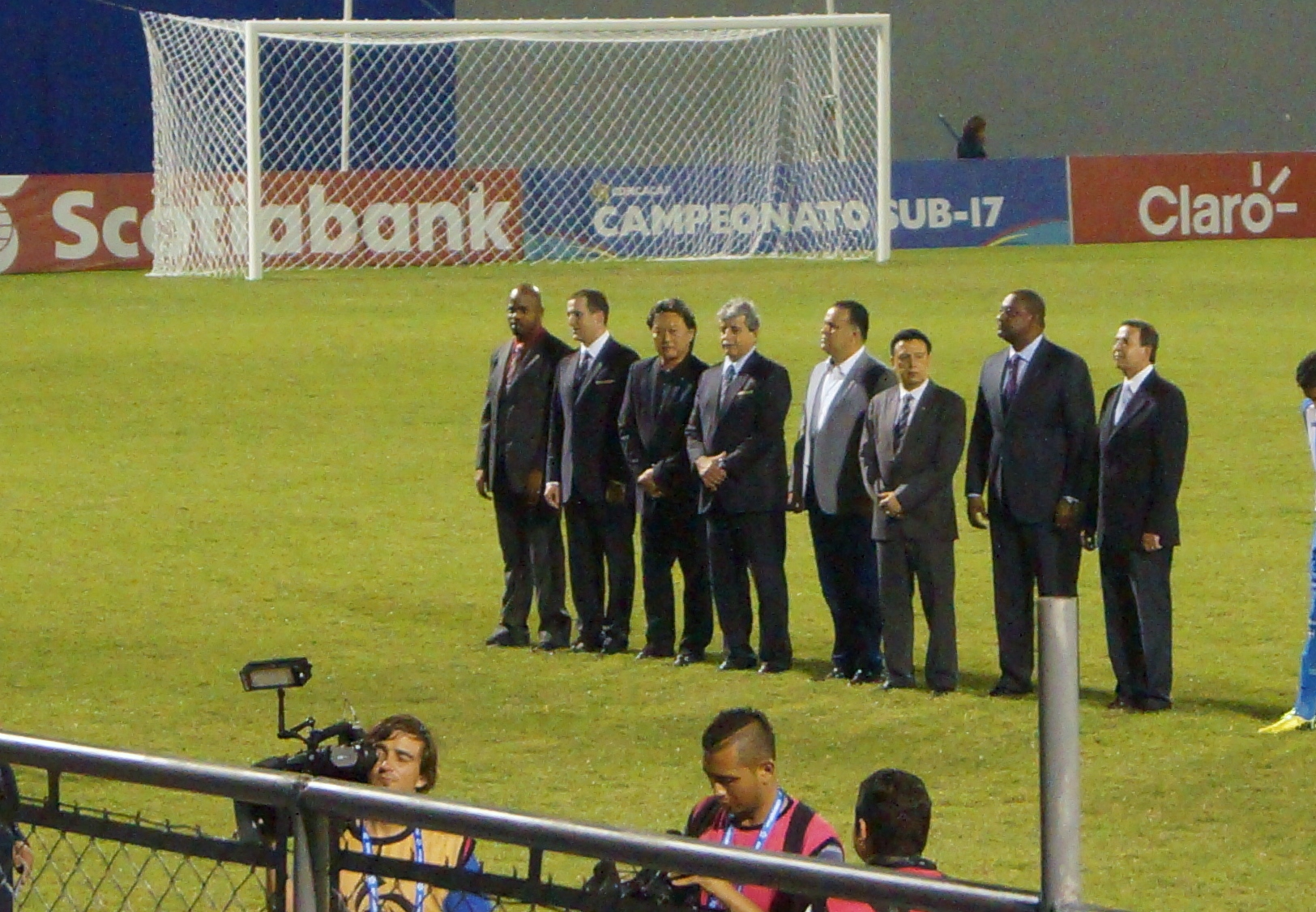
- Born: Eduardo Li Sánchez; 11 November 1958 (age 67); Puntarenas, Costa Rica

Eduardo Li Sánchez (Chinese: 爱德华多·李·桑切斯; pinyin: Àidéhuáduō·lǐ·sāngqièsī, born 11 November 1958) is a Costa Rican football administrator, FIFA executive committee member-elect, CONCACAF executive committee member, and former Costa Rican Football Federation (FEDEFUT) president. He co-founded Puntarenas F.C. with Adrián Castro Velásquez in June 2004. His paternal Chinese grandfather immigrated to Costa Rica in 1920.

Li is involved in the 2015 FIFA corruption case, and was arrested in May 2015 in Switzerland to face corruption charges in the US. Li was banned by FIFA Ethics Committee.

On 18 December 2015, he was extradited to the United States.

In October 2016 Li pleaded guilty to three charges in the Federal Courthouse in Brooklyn. He admitted to have accepted more than $500,000 in bribes from different companies for television rights to Costa Rican football games for the 2022 FIFA World Cup. Li was also charged with money laundering and wire fraud.

In 2017 the FIFA suspended him for life.
