= Alejandro Burzaco =

Argentine businessman

- Born: 30 June 1964; Buenos Aires, Argentina
- Education: St. George's College, Argentina
- Occupation: former CEO TyC
- Known for: FiFA Gate
- Children: 4

Alejandro Burzaco (born 1964) is an Argentine businessman, the former CEO of Torneos y Competencias (also known as TyC or Torneos), a sports marketing company.

A warrant was issued with regards arresting Burzaco in relation to the 2015 FIFA corruption case, where he is alleged in FBI documents to have paid $110M in bribes to allow TyC to hold on to regional football media rights. On 27 May 2015, Swiss police and assisting FBI agent missed his arrest, and when they called on his hotel bedroom as he was already at breakfast.

Burzaco fled Switzerland, and was subsequently sacked from his position by TyC on 3 June 2015. As he holds dual Italian citizenship, he fled there. With his whereabouts unknown to authorities, Interpol issued an alert requesting his arrest. Accompanied by his two lawyers, on 10 June 2015 Burzaco turned himself in to Italian police in the northern city of Bolzano.

Later Alejandro Burzaco became the U.S. government's star witness of the corruption case. In 2017 he told jurors he paid at least 30 people more than $160 million to secure broadcasting rights to South American tournaments and World Cup matches in 2026 and 2030.

He also said that Fox Sports, Grupo Televisa SAB, Media Pro, Globo, Full Play Argentina and Traffic Group had bribed FIFA for the soccer rights. Burzaco pleaded guilty and his firm forfeited more than $110 million convicted by a federal jury in Brooklyn, New York, in December 2017.

On 12 May 2023, Burzaco was sentenced to time served by U.S. District Judge Pamela Chen in Brooklyn federal court. No fine was imposed. The defendant previously forfeited about $21.7 million. Burzaco, 58, had pled guilty in 2015 to three counts of racketeering conspiracy, wire fraud conspiracy and money laundering conspiracy and agreed to cooperate with prosecutors. He admitted to paying bribes and kickbacks to officials at world soccer governing body FIFA and regional affiliates for marketing rights to tournaments including the World Cup and Copa America. Burzaco also said Qatar bribed FIFA officials to host the 2022 World Cup, which the Middle Eastern country denies. Burzaco also testified at this year's trial of Hernan Lopez and Carlos Martinez, two former 21st Century Fox executives accused of bribing soccer officials for broadcasting rights. Lopez and sports marketing company Full Play Group SA were convicted and Martinez was acquitted.
