= Costas Takkas =

Greek football administrator

- Born: Costas Michael Takkas; February 1957 (age 69); London, England
- Education: Holloway School
- Alma mater: Imperial College London
- Occupation: Attaché to the CONCACAF president
- Known for: Former Cayman Islands Football Association general secretary

Costas Michael Takkas (Greek: Κώστας Τάκκας, IPA: [ˈkostas ˈtakas]) is a football administrator, the attaché to the CONCACAF president, and the former CIFA general secretary.

== Corruption allegations ==
Takkas was arrested in May 2015 in Switzerland to face corruption charges in the United States. He was banned by FIFA Ethics Committee.

Takkas was sentenced to 15 months in prison by a US judge in 2017.

== Education ==
Takkas obtained his designation as a chartered accountant from the Institute of Chartered Accountants in England and Wales in 1982, having earned his undergraduate degree from Imperial College London in 1978.
