= Julio Rocha López =

Nicaraguan football administrator (1950–2018)

- Born: 12 October 1950; Diriamba, Carazo, Nicaragua
- Died: 13 January 2018 (aged 67); New York City, US
- Known for: former president of Central American Football Union (UNCAF) and Nicaraguan Football Federation (FENIFUT) former FIFA development officer

Julio Rocha López (Latin American Spanish: [ˈxuljo ˈrotʃa ˈlopes]; 12 October 1950 – 13 January 2018) was a Nicaraguan football administrator, FIFA development officer, Central American Football Union (UNCAF) president, and Nicaraguan Football Federation (FENIFUT) president. Rocha López was arrested in May 2015 in Switzerland to face corruption charges in the United States.

Rocha López was banned by the FIFA Ethics Committee.

In December 2016, he pleaded guilty in federal court in Brooklyn, US, to charges of racketeering conspiracy and wire fraud conspiracy.

Rocha López died from a terminal illness in the US, on 13 January 2018.
