= Jack Warner (football executive) =

Trinidadian and Tobagonian politician (born 1943)

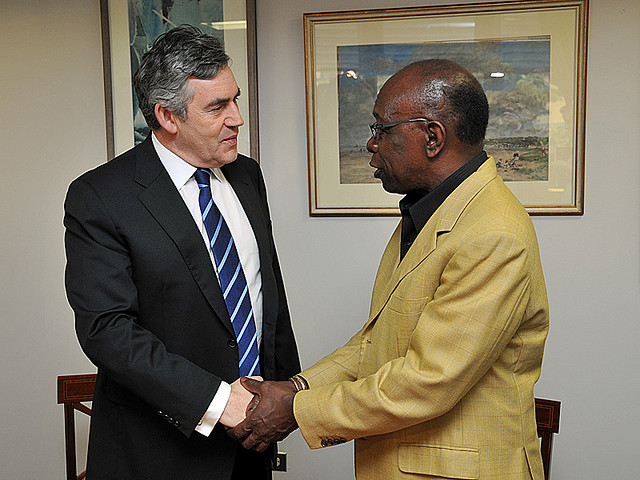
- Jack Warner (right) meets then British Prime Minister Gordon Brown in 2009

Minister of National Security of Trinidad and Tobago
- In office 28 May 2010 – 21 April 2013
- Prime Minister: Kamla Persad-Bissessar
- Preceded by: John Sandy
- Succeeded by: Emmanuel George

Member of Parliament for Chaguanas West
- In office 5 November 2007 – 7 September 2015
- Preceded by: Constituency established
- Succeeded by: Ganga Singh
- Majority: 18,352 (93%); 24 May 2010

President of CONCACAF
- In office 1990–2011
- Preceded by: Joaquín Soria Terrazas
- Succeeded by: Lisle Austin

General Secretary of the Central Football Association
- In office 1971–1973

Personal details
- Born: Austin Warner; 26 January 1943 (age 83) Rio Claro, Trinidad and Tobago, British West Indies
- Party: United National Congress (1989–2013, 2023–present)
- Other political affiliations: People's Partnership (2010–2013); Independent Liberal Party (2013–2023)
- Education: University of the West Indies (BA)

Jack Austin Warner (born Austin Warner; 26 January 1943) is a Trinidadian and Tobagonian politician, businessman, and former football executive. Warner was Vice President of FIFA and President of CONCACAF until his suspension and eventual resignation from these roles in 2011. He is also the former Minister of National Security of Trinidad and Tobago and was an elected member of the country's parliament from 2007 to 2015. He was also the owner of Joe Public F.C., a professional football club in Tunapuna, Trinidad and Tobago. Warner has been implicated in numerous corruption scandals and was banned for life from football related activities by FIFA in 2015. He currently faces extradition to the United States to face corruption charges.

Warner had been a member of the FIFA Executive Committee since 1983 and CONCACAF President since 1990. He was re-elected for a new term in 2011. Warner was implicated in numerous corruption allegations dating back to the 1980s. On 29 May 2011, Warner and Mohammed bin Hammam were provisionally suspended by the FIFA Ethics Committee pending the outcome of the investigation of corruption allegations against them. On 20 June 2011, FIFA announced Warner's resignation from all his positions in international football.

On 18 April 2013, The Confederation of North, Central American and Caribbean Association Football (CONCACAF) published its Integrity Committee report into Warner, concluding that he had committed fraud against CONCACAF and FIFA. In 2015, Warner (along with several other FIFA officials who were arrested in Zurich before the annual FIFA Congress) was charged in the United States with "wire fraud, racketeering, and money laundering." Warner is facing extradition to the United States for criminal prosecution. On 29 September 2015, the adjudicatory chamber of the Ethics Committee, chaired by Hans-Joachim Eckert, decided to ban him from taking part in any kind of football-related activity at national and international level for life.

== Early life ==
Warner was born in Rio Claro, south Trinidad, on 26 January 1943. He is one of three brothers and three sisters who were brought up almost single-handedly by their mother Stella. After gaining a scholarship from Trinidad Clay Products, he attended the College of St Philip and St James, which in 1958 became Presentation College, Chaguanas. Warner claimed that a mathematics teacher at St Philip and St James called him a "jackass" and he was teased by classmates who nicknamed him "Jack". After attending Teachers Training College, he then graduated with a BA degree from the University of the West Indies at St Augustine, and subsequently earned a Diploma in International Relations from the same institution.

In 1971, Warner became a teacher at North Eastern College, and was also at this time until 1973 a part-time sociology lecturer at UWI. From 1972 until 1993, he was a lecturer in history at the Polytechnic Institute.

== Football administrator ==
In 1966, Warner became General Secretary of the Central Football Association, and from 1971 to 1973 was General Secretary of the Central St. George Football Association.

Warner became the secretary of the Trinidad and Tobago Football Federation (TTFF) in 1973. In 1990, he was elected President of the Caribbean Football Union, resigning his post at TTFF but was immediately appointed a special advisor, a position that he still holds.

In 1983, Warner became a CONCACAF Vice-President and also joined the FIFA Executive Committee. Warner was elected CONCACAF President in 1990, unseating Joaquín Soria Terrazas who had held the seat for twenty years. Warner and the new CONCACAF General Secretary, Chuck Blazer, took over an organization with US$140,000 in annual revenue. Warner was appointed as a FIFA Vice-President in 1997. In 2010, Warner stated his intent to stand for re-election in 2011.

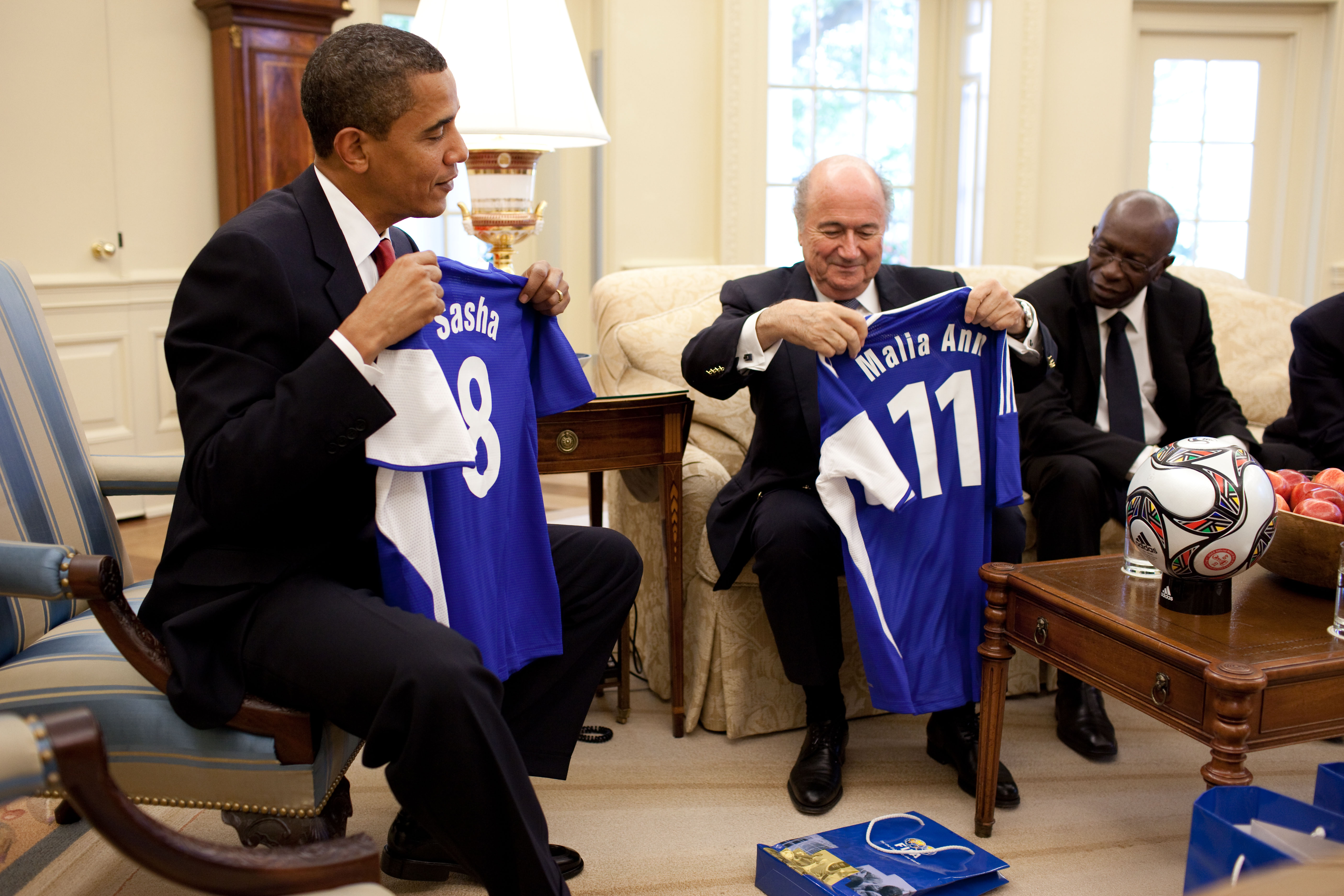
Warner with Sepp Blatter and Barack Obama

Jack Warner is the chairman of the Joe Public Football Club which he founded in 1996, in the aftermath of Trinidad and Tobago's failed World Cup qualifying campaign. Warner also helped to found Trinidad and Tobago's Professional Football League (PFL), then the first professional football league in the Caribbean, which has since been superseded by the TT Pro League.

In 1998, Warner purchased the Scarlet Ibis Hotel in St Augustine for TT$6 million, which he renovated and renamed the Emerald Apartments and Plaza. Run by Warner's son Daryl, the Emerald Apartments and Plaza sponsor local football competitions, including the 2010 Eastern Football Association Emerald Apartments & Plaza Cup. Warner also owns Kantac Plaza in Arouca, which was used as the base for Trinidad and Tobago's successful 2006 World Cup qualifying campaign. Warner had other real estate holdings in the twin island republic, including the offices used by TTFF and CONCACAF. CONCACAF pays Warner "nearly a third of a million dollars a year" rent. Warner also says he has business interests in Costa Rica and the United States. Warner states that his investments were funded from "the salary and allowances I received from FIFA".

=== Controversies ===
==== Trinidad and Tobago 2006 World Cup bonuses ====
Before the 2006 FIFA World Cup, Warner, as special advisor to TTFF, brokered a deal between the Federation and the players on Trinidad and Tobago's 2006 World Cup team to share the proceeds from their participation in the World Cup. After the tournament, the Federation declared revenue of TT$18.25 million, costs of TT$17.9 million and offered the players a split of TT$5,644.08 per player. The players rejected this figure, disputing the Federation's numbers. Warner criticized the players for refusing to accept the TTFF's unaudited statement, saying "What Trinidad is suffering from is from a situation whereby 16 or 18 players are holding a country and a federation to ransom because of bums. Shaka Hislop, the interim president of the Football Players Association of Trinidad and Tobago, responded with a letter to Warner writing "You have continually proven yourself heavily biased and opinionated in this matter." In 2010, Hislop added that "Jack Warner, though not on the TTFA officially, makes every single decision: how much bonus should be paid, who is the right coach."

The Trinidad and Tobago government revealed that the Federation received in excess of TT$173 million for their part in the tournament in Germany. TTFF proposed that the bonus dispute be heard before the UK Sports Dispute Resolution Panel, which the players agreed to. Arbitrator Ian Mill QC heard the case and ruled that Warner had "the authority of the TTFA to commit it to financial transactions" and that the players were entitled to 50 per cent of the FIFA World Cup participation money and the commercial revenues gained from Trinidad and Tobago's qualification, as well as half the net income from World Cup warm-up matches. The players' lawyer, Michael Townley, said, "At the moment, the players have not received a single cent" and alleged that the TTFF defaulted on its payment to the arbitration body.

==== England World Cup bid ====
Warner once again caused controversy in 2007 in an interview with the BBC about England's chances of holding the 2018 FIFA World Cup. He asserted that "England invented the sport but has never made any impact on world football" despite being one of only (then) seven nations to ever lift the world cup, "For Europe, England is an irritant", and that "Nobody in Europe likes England". Furthermore, Warner proposed that, if the World Cup were to be held in Europe, it should be held in Italy, Spain or France (countries that last hosted the competition in 1990, 1982 and 1998, respectively). He said that he would "battle to bring ... the tournament to his region."

However, on 14 February 2008, Warner retracted this stance. England's Football Association agreed to visit Trinidad and Tobago to play a friendly against the Trinidad and Tobago national football team on the condition that Warner apologize.

Warner argued that, "The time has come. The fact is they invented this sport [...] They last held the World Cup 42 years ago. That is almost two to three generations. There are guys in England who have never seen a World Cup on English soil." Warner maintained that the choice of England would not be popular among mainland Europe though.

During the bidding process to host the 2018 and 2022 FIFA World Cup's Warner continually supported the English bid, promising to vote in England's favour at the draw in December 2010. Warner approached the England bid team through David Beckham, offering to hold off on bringing out the vote for Russia in exchange for promises in relation to CONCACAF. Russia won the vote to hold the FIFA World Cup in 2018, with Warner widely reported to have voted for the Russian bid.

==== Dwight Yorke ====
In September 2008, after Sunderland player Dwight Yorke had withdrawn from the Trinidad and Tobago national football team, Warner attacked the club and the manager, Roy Keane. In a letter leaked to the press, Warner accused Keane of disrespecting "small countries" and having a "mean streak". Keane responded by denying the allegation, accusing Warner of being a "clown" and a "disgrace", and insisted that Yorke was retired from international football.

==== Mayagüez 2010 ====
Warner unilaterally withdrew CONCACAF's support of the football events at the Mayagüez 2010 games at the last moment stating that the tournament facilities allegedly do not meet the "minimum standards required to conduct an international tournament." He threatened to sanction countries that participated. Some of the possible sanctions were the teams accreditation by CONCACAF and ending economic helps.

=== Corruption allegations ===
Warner has been accused of corruption for repeatedly taking advantage of his position for financial gain.

==== Black market ticket sales ====
Via a private family company, Warner owned shares in Simpaul, a travel and holiday company. In a series of exposés during December 2005, the Trinidad and Tobago Express revealed that Simpaul was offering $30,000 packages to the 2006 FIFA World Cup in Germany, which effectively marked up match tickets at a high rate. FIFA's ethics committee criticised the ticket deals, concluding Warner had abused his position to obtain personal benefits and failed to declare his business interests. Warner agreed to sever all family links with Simpaul immediately. However, his son Daryan remained a director of Simpaul throughout World Cup 2006, while his personal assistant remained the company secretary of Simpaul.

FIFA started an investigation and asked their auditors Ernst & Young, to investigate. In a report submitted to FIFA in March 2006, E&Y estimated that Warner's family had made a profit of at least $1 million from reselling 2006 World Cup tickets, that Warner had directly ordered or sold on behalf of the TTFA. Minutes of FIFA's executive committee indicate that in consequence of being found guilty of breaking FIFA's Article 5, a fine of almost $1 million, equal to the expected profiteering, was imposed on the family. Despite numerous reminders from FIFA, only $250,000 has been paid. Andrew Jennings, the presenter of "FIFA's Dirty Secrets", an edition of BBC's Panorama, repeated the allegations in a November 2010 programme during the week Warner and his fellow FIFA Executive Committee members voted to decide the hosts for the 2018 and 2022 World Cups.

==== Request for personal payments ====
Scottish Football Association President John McBeth said Warner asked that monies owed to the TTFF be sent to Warner's personal account. According to McBeth, after Trinidad and Tobago visited Scotland for a friendly match at Easter Road, Edinburgh, on 30 May 2004, Warner asked that the cheque for the game be made out to him. McBeth told Warner, "we don't do that" and noted that Warner also approached other members of the Scottish FA following the game in an attempt to collect money due to the TTFF.

==== 2018 World Cup bid ====
On 10 May 2011, former chairman of the English Football Association, Lord Triesman, accused Warner and several others of asking for compensation in return for votes for England's 2018 World Cup bid. Warner reportedly asked for £2.5 million that would go toward building an education centre in Trinidad. Sir Dave Richards, the chairman of the Premier League, who was present at the meeting, confirmed that the intention of cash for votes was implied, although it was not explicitly stated. However, Warner described the allegations as "a piece of nonsense".

On 26 May 2011 the BBC published an email from Warner to the English FA requesting funds to purchase Haiti's World Cup television rights. The above article also quotes FIFA as denying that Haiti had ever been granted television rights for this competition. This email appears to substantiate a separate charge by Lord Triesman (formally heading the England 2018 World Cup bid) whereby Warner had requested funds from the English to (again) be sent into his personal account so that he could purchase the rights as a humanitarian gesture for the Haitian people. In return, the English bid team could expect his support during the bid process. The total sum that Warner had requested in this instance was in the region of $1.6 million.

==== FIFA World Cup television rights ====
In December 2011 Warner said he purchased the television rights for the 1998, 2002, 2006, 2010 and 2014 editions of the FIFA World Cup for Trinidad & Tobago, via a Mexican company. Warner said he purchased the rights for the 1998 FIFA World Cup for one dollar. Warner also said that he refused to endorse Sepp Blatter in the 2011 FIFA Presidential election despite being offered the rights to the 2018 and 2022 World Cup, again for a nominal fee. Warner further alleged that he was offered other "inducements" to develop football in the Caribbean. Warner says he used the revenue from selling on the rights to develop football in the Caribbean.

==== Haiti earthquake funds ====
In February 2012 the TTFF said that funds for Haiti donated following the 2010 earthquake were paid into a bank account controlled by Warner. FIFA subsequently froze funding to the TTFF until it received an explanation. FIFA is also withholding Warner's pension. Warner later suggested that the allegations were a conspiracy, saying that "I have nothing to answer to anybody. Who wants to make allegations, make allegations. Ask yourselves, as objective members of the media: 'Why now...?' And after you get why now, just join the dots and see."

==== Fraud, mismanagement allegations ====
On 19 April 2013, the CONCACAF Integrity Committee, headed by David Simmons, former Chief Justice of Barbados, alongside retired United States District Court Judge Ricardo Urbina and ex-PricewaterhouseCoopers partner and auditor Ernesto Hempe, issued a report accusing Warner and his former cohort Chuck Blazer of mismanagement and massive fraud. Warner is alleged to have concealed his ownership of the land on which CONCACAF's $25 million Joao Havelange Centre of Excellence was built, which made him the effective owner of the building. Warner's initial public reaction was defiant: "As far as I am aware it is baseless and malicious. I left CONCACAF and turned my back on football two years ago. Since then I have had no interest in any football-related matter."

==== Indicted for corruption in 2015 ====
In May 2015, Warner was indicted by the United States Department of Justice and an arrest warrant issued for him and other FIFA officials. Warner and the others were accused of "wire fraud, racketeering and money laundering".

Warner handed himself into Trinidad police in May and was bailed pending extradition to the United States. The following week, he said publicly that he had documents linking the outcome of the 2010 Trinidad and Tobago general election with FIFA finances and himself. Warner made the statements in a paid national television political broadcast, saying that his life was in danger, that he had given the documents to lawyers, and, "I will no longer keep secrets for them who actively seek to destroy the country."

After the US formally requested Warner's extradition in July 2015, he appealed against the procedure, represented by a strong legal team. After more than two years of deliberation, on 28 September 2017 High Court judge James Aboud ruled against the suit, allowing the extradition process to proceed, while granting Warner and his legal team 28 days to appeal the decision. On 2 November 2017 Warner's attorneys filed an appeal. On 2 March 2018, Justice of Appeal Mark Mohammed granted Warner an appeal of Aboud's ruling, to be heard in November 2018—effectively postponing any possible extradition until some time after the hearing.

In mid-June 2019 a three judge Appeal Court dismissed Warner's claim that the order against him contravened Trinidad and Tobago's Extradition Act. However, the Court granted him a 21-day stay before extradition can proceed, for a direct appeal to the Judicial Committee of the Privy Council.

In July of that year, a United States court entered a default judgement against Warner in a civil lawsuit filed by CONCACAF when Warner failed to appear, ordering Warner to repay US$79 million that he had fraudulently obtained from CONCACAF.

In April 2020, additional information was revealed in an unsealed indictment, alleging that Warner had "received $5 million in more than two dozen separate wire transfers to vote for Russia to host the 2018 soccer championship. The wire transfers were sent from 10 different shell companies in Cyprus, Anguilla and the British Virgin Islands and then cleared through correspondent U.S. bank accounts."

A constitutional challenge to his extradition began 29 May 2025. On 23 September 2025, the high court in Trinidad rejected Warner's extradition.

== Political career ==
In October 2007, Warner was elected United National Congress Alliance chairman and co-leader, to lead the party into Trinidad and Tobago's 2007 General Election. They won 15 of 41 seats, and Warner was elected as the Member of Parliament for Chaguanas West. Patrick Manning's PNM government, which had comfortably won the 2007 election, called an election less than three years into its mandate. Warner's UNC party formed a coalition with four other parties and won 24 May 2010 elections by a landslide margin of 29 of 41 seats in parliament. Warner was re-elected in Chaguanas West with the highest national vote total. He has described the previous Trinidadian administration as the "most corrupt ever" and has pledged to enforce hanging as a method of execution. Warner has said, "It is inconceivable to have 295 on death row awaiting the hangman...when no one is trying to apply the law."

After the 2010 election, Warner was appointed the Works and Transport Minister in Prime Minister Kamla Persad-Bissessar's government. Opposition leader Keith Rowley wrote to the Integrity Commission questioning Warner's ability to be a FIFA Vice President, while also the Trinidad and Tobago Works and Transport Minister. Government counsel concluded that Warner was not breaking any laws, Attorney General Anand Ramlogan said that Warner did not receive a salary from FIFA, Trinidad benefited from Warner's appointment, and his two positions were unlikely to conflict.

Although Warner was allowed to withdraw from football-related activities by FIFA with a presumption of innocence in the CFU scandal of 2011, a videotape played during FIFA's disciplinary process was consequently made public. Prime Minister Kamla Persad-Bissessar referred the videotape to the Attorney General of Trinidad and Tobago without endorsing or condemning Warner. Warner resigned as Minister of National Security on 21 April 2013 and was replaced by Emmanuel George. Warner resigned as Chairman of the United National Congress on 22 April 2013, and resigned as Member of Parliament for Chaguanas West four days later, triggering a by-election in his constituency. Warner subsequently formed a new political party, the Independent Liberal Party (ILP), and won the by-election for Chaguanas West on 29 July.

Warner contested Trinidad and Tobago's 2015 General Election held on 7 September 2015 in the Chaguanas East seat. Warner received 771 votes (4.30%) and failed to win the seat in the election.

After a long-running political feud, Surujrattan Rambachan sued Warner for defamation. In July 2016, Warner agreed to pay TT$375,000 as final settlement.

In July 2020, Warner announced his candidacy as a Member of Parliament for the Lopinot/Bon Air West seat in the 2020 Trinidad and Tobago general election. He did not win the seat.

In July 2023, Warner announced ahead of the 2023 Trinidadian local elections that he would be dissolving the Independent Liberal Party (ILP) to have the party be integrated with the United National Congress (UNC).
