= Rafael Esquivel =

Venezuelan former football administrator

- Born: Rafael Esquivel Melo; 1946 or 1947 (age 78–79)
- Occupations: former president of the Venezuelan Football Federation former member of CONMEBOL executive committee

Rafael Esquivel Melo (born 1946/1947) is a Venezuelan former football administrator. He was a member of CONMEBOL executive committee and president of the Venezuelan Football Federation (FVF).

== Career and arrest ==
Esquivel was president of the Venezuelan Football Federation from 1988 to 2015.

Esquivel was arrested in May 2015 in Switzerland to face corruption charges in the United States. He was banned by FIFA Ethics Committee for life.

In March 2016, Esquivel was extradited to the US and pleaded not guilty in Brooklyn Federal Court. He was released from jail on a US$7 million bond.

== In popular media ==
Chilean actor Gonzalo Robles portrayed Esquivel in the 2020 Amazon Prime Video original series El Presidente.
