= Luis Bedoya =

Colombian former football administrator

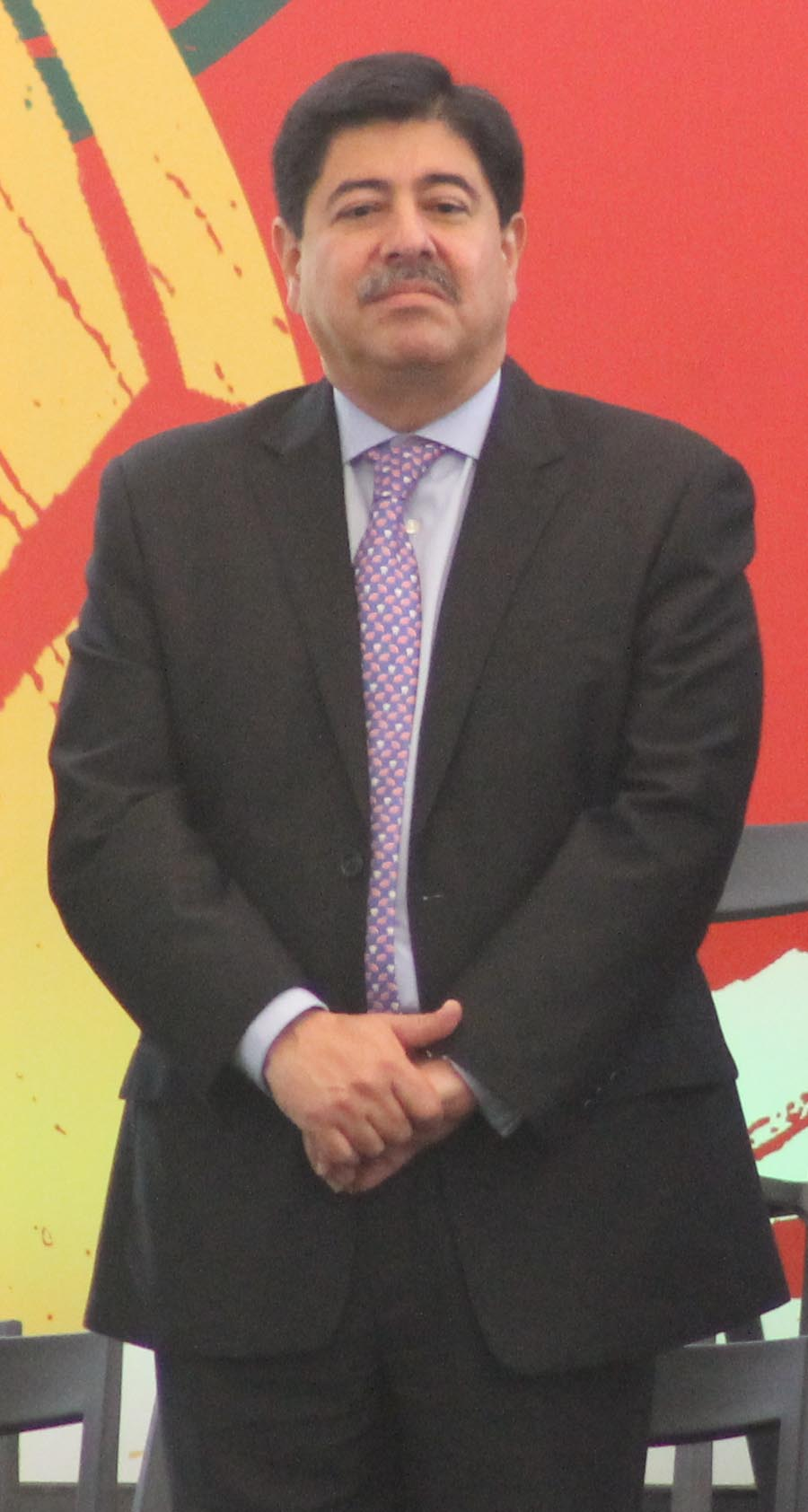
- Luis Bedoya in 2014.
- Born: Luis Erberto Bedoya Giraldo; 1959 (age 66–67)
- Occupation: former member of the FIFA Council

Luis Erberto Bedoya Giraldo (born 1959) is a Colombian former football administrator. He is a former member of the FIFA Council. In May 2016, Bedoya was banned for life by the FIFA Ethics Committee for racketeering and wire fraud.
