= CorpComms =

UK trade magazine

CorpComms Magazine
- Type: Monthly magazine
- Format: Trade magazine
- Owner(s): Hardy Media
- Editor: Helen Dunne (2006–2025)
- Founded: 2005
- Ceased publication: 2025
- ISSN: 1749-1193
- Website: www.corpcommsmagazine.co.uk

CorpComms was a monthly trade magazine targeted at the in-house communicator. Published in London, it was distributed throughout the UK and internationally. It ceased publication in 2025.

The magazine offered advice and articles on a range of topical subjects, such as social media, digital media, internal communications, sponsorship and corporate social responsibility.

The magazine ran regular features including interviews with leading in-house communicators, experts offering their 'top ten tips' on a variety of topics, and a series of personal views written by in-house communicators and an analysis of developments in the world of media.

CorpComms also published a weekly newsletter and hosted a website of the same name.

== History ==
CorpComms was launched in June 2005 as a bi-monthly publication by Cross Border Group. The launch editor was Jana Sanchez, who left when the magazine moved to a monthly publication cycle, to establish financial PR agency City Savvy. Helen Dunne became editor in January 2006. In its first year, CorpComms was shortlisted in the Best Launch category at the Independent Publisher Awards. CorpComms was the subject of a management buyout by long standing editor Helen Dunne in July 2008, by her company, Hardy Media.

== Contributors and reporters ==
Notable regular contributors to CorpComms include:

- Rosie Murray-West
- Caroline Poynton
- Simon Goodley
- Clare Harrison
- Mark Leftly
- Andrew Cave

== CorpComms 100 Club ==
The CorpComms 100 Club was established in October 2007. It is an organisation which recognises the top performing corporate communicators in the UK

Previous member have included:

- Adrian Bevington
- Guy Black
- Simon Lewis
- Guto Harri
- Leyan Phillips

== Events ==
The CorpComms awards programme was launched in 2006 and celebrated excellence in corporate communications. Categories included, amongst others, awards for Best corporate publication; Best annual report; Best employee communications; Best crisis management; Best CSR strategy and overall grand prix winner. Despite the demise of the magazine, its eponymous awards programme has continued.

In September 2010 CorpComms magazine launched the inaugural Digi Awards.The awards were launched in order to acknowledge how digital and social media are changing the way that organizations communicate with their various stakeholder communities. The Digi Awards programme ran for eight years, with the last Digi Awards ceremony taking place in 2017.

== Editor ==
Helen Dunne has worked in journalism for more than 20 years. An economics graduate, Helen started her career on International Financing Review, the weekly bible for the capital markets. She joined The Daily Telegraph in 1993, where she spent ten years, latterly as associate City editor. Helen then spent two years as deputy City editor of The Mail on Sunday, where she was shortlisted for Business Journalist of the Year, before embarking on a freelance career. She has written for many publications, including The Business, The Observer, The Sunday Telegraph and The Sun.

Dunne has also written three novels, including Trixie Trader about a fictional City trader, based on a column in the Daily Telegraph.
