= Nugraha =

Nugraha is an Indonesian name. Notable people with the name include:

- Nugraha Besoes (1941–2023), Indonesian politician
- Ayushita Widyartoeti Nugraha (born 1989), Indonesian singer and actress
- Indra Adi Nugraha (born 1993), Indonesian footballer
- Krishna Adi Nugraha (born 1996), Indonesian badminton player
- Ryu Nugraha (born 2000), Japanese footballer
