= Andy Anson =

British businessman

Andrew Edward Anson OBE (born 1964 or 1965) is a British businessman primarily known for his work in the sports and media industries. He is the CEO of Sportscape Group – an e-commerce business which runs online, off-price retail specialists SportPursuit and Private Sport Shop. Prior to joining, Anson was the CEO of the British Olympic Association, where he spent six years.

== Early life ==
The son of a bank manager, Anson was born at the Boundary Park Hospital in Oldham, Lancashire, and grew up in nearby Rochdale. He began playing football at a young age and, despite being a fan of Manchester United, played for Manchester City's schoolboys team after being spotted in a game for the Oulder Hill School team. He did not pursue football as a professional career and earned a place at Exeter College, Oxford, where he attained a second-class degree in mathematics, sharing a tutorial with child genius Ruth Lawrence at one stage. He continued to play football at university, however, and eventually earned his Blue.

== Career ==
After leaving Oxford, Anson returned to the north-west of England to work for Andersen Consulting, where he represented various clients, including North West Water. However, in the early 1990s, he left Andersen to enrol on a Master of Business Administration (MBA) course at INSEAD in Fontainebleau. To cope with the costs of attending INSEAD, Anson returned to consulting at the end of the course, working for the Kalchas Group. However, he was soon headhunted by The Walt Disney Company, and he moved to Los Angeles for three-and-a-half years, working for Disney's consumer products division. In this capacity, he was responsible for the licensing of all clothes and toys for the company. During Anson's time in the consumer products division, the company generated $7 billion in revenue, and he was promoted to the position of chief financial officer.

At the end of his time with Disney, Anson returned to the UK, where he took a position as Channel 4's Head of Strategic Planning. He later became the managing director of Channel 4 Interactive. While at Channel 4, Anson was heavily involved in the launch of its sister channel, E4. In 2002, Anson left Channel 4 to work at the London office of management consulting firm, OC&C Strategy Consultants, becoming a partner in the company, responsible for Media and Entertainment.

Anson was appointed Officer of the Order of the British Empire (OBE) in the 2022 New Year Honours for services to sport, particularly during COVID-19.

=== Manchester United ===
In 2003, Anson was approached by his childhood football club, Manchester United, to become their new Commercial Director in the wake of David Gill's promotion to chief executive, after Peter Kenyon departed to Chelsea. The appointment was confirmed in December 2003, and Anson started work in February 2004. While at Manchester United, he was responsible for signing the club's then-record shirt sponsorship deal with AIG.

=== Association of Tennis Professionals ===
In March 2007, Anson became the new chief executive of the Association of Tennis Professionals in Europe (ATP Europe), replacing the outgoing Horst Klosterkemper. He remained in the role for two and a half years. He also served as chairman of the ATP Finals at The O2 Arena in London and co-CEO of the ATP Champions Tour, a tournament for former professional players.

=== England 2018 ===
In 2008, Anson was named as the chief executive of England 2018 Ltd, the company behind The Football Association's bid to host the 2018 FIFA World Cup. He began work in his new position on 1 January 2009 and remained in the position until the company dissolved in 2011 following the unsuccessful bid results. The England 2018 bid received recognition as the best all round technical bid However, England lost out to Russia in a process beset by corruption, leading to Anson criticising FIFA president Sepp Blatter for influencing the members of the committee that voted on the World Cup hosts against the English bid.

=== Fanatics International (formerly Kitbag) ===
After a short break, in the summer of 2011, Anson was appointed chief executive of sports retailer Kitbag. In February 2016, following the successful turnaround of Kitbag, Anson oversaw the sale of the business to US market leader Fanatics. He remained with the business for 12 months ensuring the successful transition.

=== Teneo ===
On 1 March 2017, Anson was appointed global president of Teneo Sports, the sports arm of New York-based international C-suite advisory firm and investment banking platform Teneo.

=== Goals Soccer Centres plc ===
April 2018 saw Andy appointed as CEO of Goals Soccer Centres plc

=== Lancashire County Cricket Club ===
Anson was appointed chair of Lancashire County Cricket Club in 2020 after the death of David Hodgkiss from COVID. Anson's appointment was ratified at the 2021 AGM. In 2024, Anson was re-elected to the Board for a further three-year term, but at a board meeting held on 7th July 2025 announced his intention to resign following that summer's England v India test at Old Trafford.

=== British Olympic Association ===
Anson was appointed CEO of the British Olympic Association at a Board meeting in May 2019, before starting his role in November 2019. He had previously served as a non-executive director of the National Olympic Committee between 2011-2019. Anson announced his intention to step down as CEO in July 2025, to take up a new role with private equity business bd-capital. He left the British Olympic Association in October 2025.

=== Sportscape Group ===
Anson joined Sportscape Group as CEO in November 2025. Sportscape Group is a European sports e-commerce business co-owned by private equity companies Bridgepoint Group and bd-capital.

=== Non-executive directorships ===
Anson has also served as a non-executive director of Belfast-based UTV Media, the British Olympic Association and the Racecourse Media Group. He is currently a serving non-executive director of sports nutrition business Science in Sport, Hertha BSC and Red Star FC.
