= Belgium–Netherlands 2018 FIFA World Cup bid =

Football World Cup host nation bid

The official logo of the Belgium-Netherlands 2018 FIFA World Cup bid

Alain Courtois, a Belgian Member of Parliament, announced in October 2006 that a formal bid would be made on behalf of the three Benelux countries: Belgium, the Netherlands, and Luxembourg to host either the 2018 FIFA World Cup or 2022 version, but later decided to concentrate solely on the 2018 World Cup. In June 2007,’the three countries launched their campaign not as a joint bid in the manner of the Korea-Japan World Cup in 2002, but emphasizing it as a common political organization. Luxembourg would not host any matches or automatically qualify for the finals in a successful Benelux bid, but would host a FIFA congress.

== Schedule ==
Date	Notes
15 January 2009	Applications formally invited
2 February 2009	Closing date for registering intention to bid
16 March 2009	Deadline to submit completed bid registration forms
14 May 2010	Deadline for submission of full details of bid
9–12 August 2010	Inspection committee visits Belgium/Netherlands
2 December 2010	FIFA to appoint hosts for 2018 and 2022 World Cups

== Developments ==
Belgium and the Netherlands registered their intention to bid jointly in March 2009. A delegation led by the presidents of the Belgian and Dutch national football associations met FIFA president Sepp Blatter on 14 November 2007, officially announcing their interest in submitting a joint bid. On 19 March 2008 the delegation also met with UEFA President Michel Platini to convince him that it was a serious offer under one management. Afterwards they claimed to have impressed Platini, who supports the idea of getting the world cup to Europe.

FIFA tends to favour bids from single nations. In 2009, Blatter suggested that joint bids would be rejected if a suitable individual bid was available. Another factor that is against the Benelux bid is the lack of an 80,000 capacity stadium to host the final. However, the city council of Rotterdam gave permission in March 2009 for development of a new stadium with a capacity of around 80,000 seats to be completed in time for the possible World Cup in 2018.

Belgian prime minister Yves Leterme met the mayor of the city of Brussels Freddy Thielemans and NMBS/SNCB leader Jannie Haek to discuss plans for a new 60,000-seater stadium in Brussels, for which there are three possibilities: the first would be to renovate and expand the current King Baudouin Stadium, the second would be to build a new stadium on the Heysel, and the third would be to build one on the property of the SNCB in the municipality of Schaerbeek. As a whole, Leterme stated that Belgium should get 4 stadia with a capacity of 40,000 together with the new 60,000-seater stadium in Brussels. Euro 2000 was also jointly hosted by Belgium and the Netherlands. On 23 June former French football international Christian Karembeu was presented as official counselor for the joint bid.

=== 2018 World Cup European bids ===
After eventual withdrawals from both Australia, and the United States in bidding for the 2018 World Cup, and in practice with FIFA's current policy of the same continent unable to win both bids, the Belgium/Netherlands bid is effectively disqualified from eligibility for the 2022 edition.

== Candidate venues ==
In November 2009, the venues were presented. In Belgium, matches will be played in 7 venues: Antwerp, Bruges, Brussels, Charleroi, Genk, Ghent and Liège. In the Netherlands, only five cities would host matches: Amsterdam, Eindhoven, Enschede, Heerenveen and Rotterdam, but both Amsterdam and Rotterdam will provide two stadiums. Eindhoven will function as the 'capital city' of the World Cup.

(Belgium) Brussels	(Netherlands) Rotterdam		(Netherlands) Amsterdam	
Brussels Stadium	New Rotterdam Stadium	De Kuip (Stadium Feyenoord)	Amsterdam Arena	Olympic Stadium
Capacity: 80,000 (new stadium)	Capacity: 80,000 (new stadium)	Capacity: 44,779	Capacity: 65,000 (current capacity: 48,850)	Capacity: 44,000 (current capacity: 21,000) (23,000 temporary seats)
(Netherlands) Eindhoven	Belgium–Netherlands 2018 FIFA World Cup bid is located in Benelux			(Belgium) Liège
Philips Stadium	Belgium–Netherlands 2018 FIFA World Cup bid is located in Benelux			Stade Maurice Dufrasne
Capacity: 45,000 (current capacity: 34,765)	Belgium–Netherlands 2018 FIFA World Cup bid is located in Benelux			Capacity: 44,000 (current capacity: 27,670)
(Netherlands) Heerenveen	Belgium–Netherlands 2018 FIFA World Cup bid is located in Benelux			(Netherlands) Enschede
Abe Lenstra Stadium	Belgium–Netherlands 2018 FIFA World Cup bid is located in Benelux			De Grolsch Veste
Capacity: 44,000 (current capacity: 25,322)	Belgium–Netherlands 2018 FIFA World Cup bid is located in Benelux			Capacity: 44,000 (current capacity: 23,400)
(Belgium) Antwerp	(Belgium) Ghent	(Belgium) Bruges	(Belgium) Charleroi	(Belgium) Genk
Port of Antwerp Stadium	Artevelde Stadium	Chartreuse Stadium	Stade du Pays de Charleroi	Cristal Arena
Capacity: 40,579 (new stadium)	Capacity: 40,300 (new stadium)	Capacity: 40,000 (new stadium)	Capacity: 40,000 (new stadium)	Capacity: 40,000 (current capacity: 21,457)

== Official Bid Partners ==
- ING Group
- KLM Royal Dutch Airlines
- PwC
- Randstad NV
- Royal BAM Group

== See also ==
- Euro 2000 - An international football tournament co-hosted by Belgium and the Netherlands
