= Qatar 2022 FIFA World Cup bid =

Football World Cup host nation bid

- Bid logo

Tournament details
- Host country: Qatar
- Venues: 12 (in 7 host cities)

The Qatar 2022 FIFA World Cup bid was a successful bid by Qatar to host the 2022 FIFA World Cup. With a population of 2 million people, Qatar was the first Arab state to host the World Cup. Sheikh Mohammed bin Hamad bin Khalifa Al-Thani, son of Hamad bin Khalifa Al Thani the then Emir of Qatar, was the chairman of the bid committee. Qatar promoted their hosting of the tournament as representing the Arab World, and has drawn support from across the member states of the Arab League. They also positioned their bid as an opportunity to bridge the gap between the Arab World and the West.

In November 2010, Qatar hosted a friendly match between Brazil and Argentina.

Then-president of FIFA Sepp Blatter endorsed the idea of having a World Cup in the Arab World, saying in April 2010: "The Arabic world deserves a World Cup. They have 22 countries and have not had any opportunity to organize the tournament". Blatter also praised Qatar's progress: "When I was first in Qatar there were 400,000 people here and now there are 1.6 million. In terms of infrastructure, when you are able to organise the Asian Games (in 2006) with more than 30 events for men and women, then that is not in question". On 2 December 2010, it was announced that Qatar will host the 2022 FIFA World Cup.

== Climate ==
Working against the Qatar bid was the extreme temperature in the desert country. The World Cup always takes place during the European off-season in June and July. During this period the average daytime high in most of Qatar exceeds 40 °C (104 °F), the average daily low temperatures not dropping below 30 °C (86 °F). In response to this issue, Sheikh Mohammed bin Hamad bin Khalifa al-Thani, the 2022 Qatar bid chairman, has stated, "the event has to be organized in June or July. We will have to take the help of technology to counter the harsh weather. We have already set in motion the process. A stadium with controlled temperature is the answer to the problem. We have other plans up our sleeves as well".

== Schedule ==
13–17 September 2010	Inspection committee visits Qatar
2 December 2010	FIFA appoint Qatar as host for 2022 World Cup

== Proposed venues ==
The first five proposed stadiums for the World Cup were unveiled at the beginning of March 2010. The stadium will employ cooling technology capable of reducing temperatures within the stadium by up to 20°C (36°F), and the upper tiers of the stadium will be disassembled after the World Cup and donated to countries with less developed sports infrastructure. All five stadium projects have been designed by German architect Albert Speer & Partners.

The air conditioning in the stadiums for both the players and spectators would be solar powered, carbon neutral and provided by Arup of England.

The Al-Khor Stadium is planned for Al-Khor city, located 50 kilometres north of Doha. The stadium will have a total capacity of 45,330, with 19,830 of the seats forming part of a temporary modular upper tier. The Al-Wakrah stadium, to be located in Al-Wakrah city in southern Qatar, will have a total capacity of 45,120 seats. The stadium will also contain a temporary upper tier of 25,500 seats. The stadium will be surrounded by large solar panels and decorated with Islamic art. The Al-Wakrah and Al-Khor stadiums would have been built regardless of whether Qatar was awarded the World Cup, according to the bid committee. However, the temporary upper-tier sections would not have been added if Qatar had lost the right to host the tournament.

Al-Shamal	Al-Khor	Umm Slal	Al-Daayen	Location of the proposed cities in the Qatar 2022 FIFA World Cup bid.
Al-Shamal Stadium	Al-Khor Stadium	Umm Slal Stadium	Lusail Iconic Stadium	Location of the proposed cities in the Qatar 2022 FIFA World Cup bid.
Capacity: 45,120 (planned)	Capacity: 45,330 (planned)	Capacity: 45,120 (planned)	Capacity: 86,250 (planned)	Location of the proposed cities in the Qatar 2022 FIFA World Cup bid.
Al-Rayyan				Location of the proposed cities in the Qatar 2022 FIFA World Cup bid.
Al-Rayyan Stadium	Education City Stadium	Khalifa International Stadium	Al-Gharafa Stadium	Location of the proposed cities in the Qatar 2022 FIFA World Cup bid.
Capacity: 21,282 (plans to expand to 44,740)	Capacity: 45,350 (planned)	Capacity: 50,000 (plans to expand to 68,030)	Capacity: 21,282 (plans to expand to 44,740)	Location of the proposed cities in the Qatar 2022 FIFA World Cup bid.
Doha			Al-Wakrah	Location of the proposed cities in the Qatar 2022 FIFA World Cup bid.
Qatar University Stadium	Doha Port Stadium	Sports City Stadium	Al-Wakrah Stadium	Location of the proposed cities in the Qatar 2022 FIFA World Cup bid.
Capacity: 43,520 (planned)	Capacity: 44,950 (planned)	Capacity: 47,560 (planned)	Capacity: 45,120 (planned)	Location of the proposed cities in the Qatar 2022 FIFA World Cup bid.

== Controversy ==
=== Bribery ===
During May 2011, bribery on the part of two members of the FIFA Executive Committee were tabled by Lord Triesman of the English FA. These allegations were based on information from a whistleblower involved with the Qatari bid. FIFA has since opened an internal inquiry into the matter, and would consider a revote on the 2022 World Cup if the allegations were proven. Former FIFA president Sepp Blatter conceded in 2011 that there was widespread support to re-hold the 2022 vote won by Qatar.

In testimony to a UK parliamentary inquiry board in May 2011 Lord Triesman alleged that Trinidad and Tobago's Jack Warner demanded $4 million for an education center in his country and Paraguay's Nicolás Léoz asked for an honorary knighthood in exchange for their votes. Also, two Sunday Times reporters testified that they had been told that Jacques Anouma of the Ivory Coast and Issa Hayatou of Cameroon were each paid $1.5 million to support Qatar's bid for the tournament. All four have denied the allegations. Mohammed bin Hammam, who played a key role in securing the games for Qatar, withdrew as a candidate for president of FIFA in May 2011 after being accused of bribing 25 FIFA officials to vote for his candidacy. Both Bin Hammam and Warner were suspended by FIFA in wake of these allegations, with Warner reacting to his suspension by questioning Blatter's conduct and adding that FIFA secretary general Jerome Valcke had also told him that Qatar had bought the 2022 World Cup. Valcke subsequently issued a statement denying he had suggested it was bribery, saying instead that the country had "used its financial muscle to lobby for support".

Qatar officials denied any impropriety and insist that the corruption allegations are being driven by envy and mistrust by those who do not want the World Cup staged in Qatar. Qatar Airways CEO Akbar Al Baker gave an interview to German media in June 2014 stating that "The country is not getting the respect it deserves over its efforts to hold the World Cup and that the Qatari Emir strictly punishes and forbids instances of corruption and bribery with a zero-tolerance policy".

According to leaked documents seen by The Sunday Times, Qatari state-owned television channel Al Jazeera (now beIN Sport) secretly offered $400 million to FIFA, for broadcasting rights, just 21 days before FIFA announced that Qatar will hold the 2022 World Cup. The contract also documented a secret TV deal between FIFA and Qatar's state run media broadcast Al Jazeera that $100 million will also be paid into a designated FIFA account only if Qatar wins the World Cup ballot in 2010. An additional $480 million was also offered by the State of Qatar government, three years after the initial offer, which brings the amount to $880 million offered by Qatar to host the 2022 World Cup. The documents are now part of the bribery inquiry by Swiss Police. FIFA refused to comment on the inquiry and responded to The Sunday Times in an email, writing "allegations linked to the Fifa World Cup 2022 bid have already been extensively commented by Fifa, who in June 2017 published the Garcia report in full on Fifa.com. Furthermore, please note that Fifa lodged a criminal complaint with the Office of the Attorney General of Switzerland, which is still pending. Fifa is and will continue to cooperate with the authorities." A beIN spokesman said in a statement that the company would not "respond to unsubstantiated or wildly speculative allegations."

=== Human rights and the conditions of migrant workers ===
The use of migrant labour in Qatar's construction of the tournament's numerous new stadiums has been a major source of debate around the 2022 FIFA World Cup. Amnesty International, a human rights organization, judged Qatar for its treatment of migrant workers and argued in a 56-page report that Qatar fell short to look into, address, and prevent the death of these workers.

After all these years of Qatar being brought to light for its human rights records, what the public has been able to observe are the reforms the nation made to clear up its record and create room for structural improvement, as per a report by The Peninsula Qatar that claimed the nation raised awareness through seminars, lectures, and training workshops in the local community. A specialized department for the promotion and defence of human rights was established, and it carried out its inspection and service duties for the general dissemination of the significance of human rights reforms. These actions were taken in May 2023 when the MoI (Minister of interior) hosted a seminar on "Services of the Human Rights Department to the Public" that also covered the services offered to the general public by the department, including the procedures used to carry out human rights.

However the measures, which became enforceable on August 30, 2020, introduced a mandatory minimum wage of 1,000 Qatari riyal (roughly $275 USD) per month and made it easy for migrant workers to switch jobs before the end of their contracts without first requiring a No Objection Certificate (NOC) from their employer. Employers must give workers a living wage or provide allowances to cover these costs in addition to the raised minimum wage for everybody. All this was revealed in a report published by the Human rights watch. In their article, which was published in September 2020, experts from the OHCHR (Office of the High Commissioner for Human Rights) added, "We are very encouraged by the bold steps Qatar is taking to increase the protection of migrant workers' rights and ensure adequate living and working conditions for all."

The football associations of several countries qualified for the tournament have taken stands against these alleged human rights violations, and teams such as the Netherlands and Germany have made symbolic protest actions to show their disapproval.

Responding to the allegation that as many as 6,500 migrant workers may have died as the result of inhumane labour conditions, representatives from Qatar's labor ministry have stated that "no other country has come so far on labour reform in such a short amount of time, but we acknowledge that there is more work to be done". After a thorough investigation, the International Labour Organization, claimed the figures "misleading" and said they had been wrongly linked to World Cup sites without proper context in November 2022 via reported drafted by France24. The country did successfully reimbursed US$320 million to wage abuse victims through the Workers’ Support and Insurance Fund stated the ILO in November 2022.

Furthermore, according to a statement by ITUC (International Trade Union Confederation) General Secretary Sharan Burrow, who had previously been a harsh critic of Qatar's labour laws, workers can now obtain justice in the country. She praised "the amazing change of the labour legislation in Qatar."

=== Extreme climate ===
The World Cup is usually held in the northern hemisphere summer. During this season in Qatar, the temperature can get to 50 °C (122 °F). Qatar says that this will not be a problem for it hosting the World Cup. A section from Qatar 2022 Bid official site explains:

"Each of the five stadia will harness the power of the sun's rays to provide a cool environment for players and fans by converting solar energy into electricity that will then be used to cool both fans and players at the stadia. When games are not taking place, the solar installations at the stadia will export energy onto the power grid. During matches, the stadia will draw energy from the grid. This is the basis for the stadia's carbon neutrality. Along with the stadia, we plan to make the cooling technologies we’ve developed available to other countries in hot climates, so that they too can host major sporting events".

An example of this occurred during the 2018 World Cup qualifier with China under air conditioning, which happened on 8 October 2015.

Such cooling techniques will be able to reduce temperatures from 45 to 25 degrees Celsius (113 to 77 °F), which would be comfortable for players and spectators during matches, the bid also proposes these cooling technologies to be used in fan-zones, training pitches and walkways between Metro stations and stadia. But if anyone enters an area without this technology, they may still be exposed to extreme levels of heat.

Qatar declared their intention to change the dates of the World Cup to winter immediately upon being award the Cup because of all the controversy surrounding the topic.

=== Alcohol ===
Alcohol can currently be consumed legally in hotel bars and clubs by showing a passport for reporting and a special permit to attend the club. The question of whether alcohol was allowed to be consumed in additional areas and at the games themselves was asked, Hassan Abdullah al Thawed, chief executive of the Qatar 2022 World Cup bid, said the Muslim state would also permit alcohol consumption during the World Cup. Qatar's bid promised that beer would be permitted at stadia, but this promise was reneged just days before the first game. A few specific fan-zones were set up during the event, that would provide alcohol for sale. Also certain bars were developed for all the tourists coming to support their chosen teams in the World Cup.

== Official bid partners ==
- QNB Group
- Qatar Airways
- Blue Salon
- Lambie-Nairn
- Star group SAHIL shoe

== See also ==
- 2018 and 2022 FIFA World Cup bids
- FIFA World Cup
- 2018 FIFA World Cup
- 2022 FIFA World Cup
