= South Korea 2022 FIFA World Cup bid =

Football World Cup host nation bid

South Korea's 2022 World Cup bid logo

The Korea 2022 FIFA World Cup bid was the second official bid from the Korea Football Association (KFA) to host the World Cup. If this bid was successful, Korea would have been hosting their second World Cup Finals and it would have been their first solo hosting since they shared the 2002 FIFA World Cup with other co-host Japan. Despite recent tensions, Han Sung-joo, chairman of the bid committee hoped to involve North Korea if South Korea won hosting rights.

== Schedule ==
Date	Notes
15 January 2009	Applications formally invited
2 February 2009	Closing date for registering intention to bid
16 March 2009	Deadline to submit completed bid registration forms
14 May 2010	Deadline for submission of full details of bid
22–25 July 2010	Inspection committee visits Korea Republic
2 December 2010	FIFA appoints Russia as hosts for 2018 and Qatar for 2022 World Cup.

== Candidate venues ==
Seoul		Busan	Incheon	
Seoul World Cup Stadium (Note: Stadium used in 2002 FIFA World Cup)	Olympic Stadium	Busan Asiad Main Stadium	Incheon Munhak Stadium	Incheon Asiad Main Stadium
FC Seoul	Multiple uses	Busan IPark	Incheon Korail	New Stadium
Capacity: 66,806 (plans to expand to 83,000)	Capacity: 69,950	Capacity: 53,864 (plans to expand to 60,000)	Capacity: 49,084	Capacity: 30,000
Daegu	Daejeon	Gwangju	Ulsan	Suwon
Daegu Stadium	Daejeon World Cup Stadium	Gwangju World Cup Stadium	Ulsan Munsu Football Stadium	Suwon World Cup Stadium
Daegu FC	Daejeon Citizen	Gwangju FC	Ulsan Hyundai	Suwon Samsung Bluewings
Capacity: 66,422 (plans to expand to 81,422)	Capacity: 40,535	Capacity: 44,118 (plans to expand to 45,245)	Capacity: 44,102	Capacity: 43,959
Goyang	Jeonju	Cheonan	Seogwipo	
Goyang Stadium	Jeonju World Cup Stadium	Cheonan Stadium	Jeju World Cup Stadium	
Goyang Hi FC	Jeonbuk Hyundai Motors	Cheonan City FC	Jeju United	
Capacity: 41,311	Capacity: 42,477	Capacity: 26,000 (plans to expand to 45,000)	Capacity: 35,657 (plans to expand to 43,657)	

== Official Bid Partners ==
- Hana Bank
- Samsung
- Hyundai
- Korean Air
