= Ángel María Villar =

Spanish footballer (born 1950)

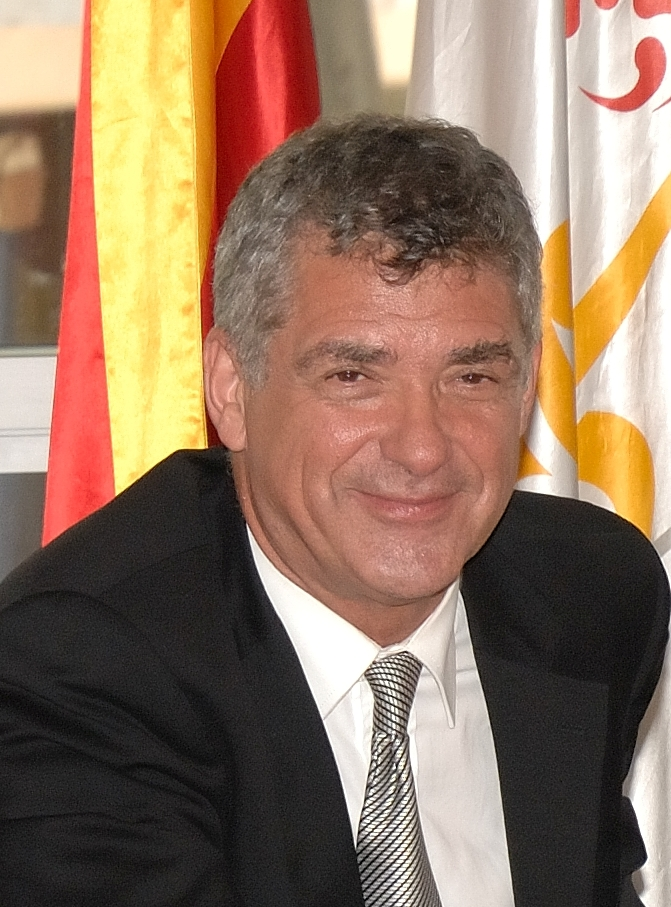
- Villar in 2009

Senior Vice President of FIFA
- In office 16 March 2017 – 27 July 2017
- President: Gianni Infantino
- Preceded by: Issa Hayatou
- Succeeded by: David Chung

First Vice President of UEFA
- In office 1992 – September 2017
- President: Lennart Johansson; Michel Platini; Aleksander Čeferin

Acting President of UEFA
- In office 9 October 2015 – 14 September 2016
- Preceded by: Michel Platini
- Succeeded by: Aleksander Čeferin

24th President of the Royal Spanish Football Federation
- In office 29 June 1988 – 27 July 2017
- Preceded by: José Luis Roca
- Succeeded by: Juan Luis Larrea (interim); Luis Rubiales

Personal details
- Born: Ángel María Villar Llona; 21 January 1950 (age 76) Bilbao, Spain
- Height: 1.79 m (5 ft 10 in)
- Occupation: Footballer (retired)
Association football career
- Position: Midfielder
Youth career
- 1961–1969: Athletic Bilbao
Senior career*
Years	Team	Apps	(Gls)
1969–1981	Athletic Bilbao	291	(8)
1969–1970	→ Galdakao (loan)	18	(1)
1970–1971	→ Getxo (loan)	23	(1)
Total		332	(10)
International career
1972	Spain amateur	1	(0)
1973–1979	Spain	22	(3)
1978–1980	Basque Country	4	(0)
- * Club domestic league appearances and goals

Ángel María Villar Llona (born 21 January 1950) is a Spanish former professional footballer who played as a midfielder.

After having represented Athletic Bilbao for one decade (appearing in more than 350 official matches and scoring 11 goals), he went on to serve as president of the Spanish Football Federation for almost 30 years.

Villar was a Spain international in the 1970s.

== Club career ==
Villar was born in Bilbao, Biscay, and emerged through the youth ranks of local Athletic Bilbao, going on to make his senior debut in amateur football on loan, after which he returned in 1971. He was an undisputed starter in nine of his ten seasons with the Basque side, helping them to two Copa del Rey finals and winning the 1973 edition.

In March 1974, during a 0–0 La Liga home draw against FC Barcelona, Villar elbowed opposing superstar Johan Cruyff, as the Dutch was subject to severe man-marking by several Athletic players. He eventually received a four-match ban for his actions, but the pair later reconciled, and Villar retired seven years later with 361 competitive appearances for his main club.

== International career ==
Villar played 22 times for Spain, scoring three goals. His debut came on 17 October 1973 in a 0–0 friendly with Turkey, in Istanbul.

On 9 December 1979, his last cap, Villar helped the nation to qualify for UEFA Euro 1980, scoring in a 3–1 win in Cyprus. He did not participate, however, in any major international tournament.

Villar also represented the unofficial Basque Country team.

== Post-retirement ==
In 1979, still as an active player, Villar majored in law, and would practice the activity during the following years, which he accumulated with several posts in the footballing hierarchies – he was one of the founders of the Association of Spanish Footballers in 1978.

Having already worked in the Royal Spanish Football Federation under president José Luis Roca, Villar was elected his successor in 1988. He was in charge as the national team won the 2010 FIFA World Cup as well as the 2008 and 2012 European Championships.

Villar also occupied several roles within UEFA and FIFA, being named the organizations' vice president, respectively in 1992 and 2002. Following Spain's controversial exit at the 2002 FIFA World Cup, he left his post at the latter, but was immediately named, amongst others, for the presidency of the Referees' Committee; also that year, he was named for that position at UEFA.

Villar led the unsuccessful Spain and Portugal 2018 World Cup bid. On 16 February 2012, he was elected for his seventh term at the helm of the Spanish Federation, remaining in office until 2016.

Following the suspension of Michel Platini in October 2015, Villar became UEFA's acting president. The following month, he was fined 25,000 Swiss francs and warned by the FIFA Ethics Committee for failing to cooperate with the investigation into the bidding process of the 2018 World Cup.

On 18 July 2017, Villar was arrested on suspicion of embezzling funds. Nine days later, he resigned from his post at both FIFA and UEFA.

== Personal life ==
Villar's niece, María Villar Galaz, was kidnapped and murdered in Toluca, Mexico in September 2016.

== Honours ==
Athletic Bilbao

- Copa del Rey: 1972–73; runner-up: 1976–77
- UEFA Cup runner-up: 1976–77
