= Indra Adi Nugraha =

Indonesian association footballer

Personal information
- Full name: Indra Adi Nugraha
- Date of birth: 8 October 1993 (age 33)
- Place of birth: Trenggalek, Indonesia
- Height: 1.78 m (5 ft 10 in)
- Position: Goalkeeper

Team information
- Current team: Bhayangkara
- Number: 38

Youth career
- 2012–2014: Persiga Trenggalek

Senior career*
Years	Team	Apps	(Gls)
2014–2017	Persiga Trenggalek	37	(0)
2018–	Bhayangkara	6	(0)
- * Club domestic league appearances and goals as of 18 February 2025

Indra Adi Nugraha (born 8 October 1993) is an Indonesian professional footballer who plays as a goalkeeper for Liga 2 club Bhayangkara.

== Club career ==
=== Bhayangkara FC ===
He was signed for Bhayangkara to play in Liga 1 in the 2018 season. Indra Nugraha made his league debut on 13 August 2018 in a match against PSIS Semarang at the Moch. Soebroto Stadium, Magelang.

== Career statistics ==
=== Club ===
As of 18 February 2025.

Club	Season	League		Cup		Continental		Other		Total	
Club	Season	Apps	Goals	Apps	Goals	Apps	Goals	Apps	Goals	Apps	Goals
Bhayangkara	2018	1	0	0	0	–		0	0	1	0
Bhayangkara	2019	1	0	0	0	–		0	0	1	0
Bhayangkara	2020	0	0	0	0	–		0	0	0	0
Bhayangkara	2021–22	1	0	0	0	–		1 (Note: Appearances in Menpora Cup.)	0	2	0
Bhayangkara	2022–23	2	0	0	0	–		0	0	2	0
Bhayangkara	2023–24	0	0	0	0	–		0	0	0	0
Bhayangkara	2024–25	1	0	0	0	–		0	0	1	0
Career total		6	0	0	0	0	0	1	0	7	0

== Honours ==
Bhayangkara

- Liga 2 runner-up: 2024–25
