= International Financing Review =

- Owner(s): Refinitiv
- Founded: 1974
- Headquarters: London
- ISSN: 0953-0223
- Website: Official website

The International Financing Review (IFR), also known as International Financing Review Magazine, is a London-based financial magazine and was established in 1974. It contains stories and data on international investment banking companies and international securities markets. Its ISSN number is ISSN 0953-0223.

IFR, previously affiliated with Thomson Financial Limited, is now owned by Refinitiv, and the parent company of the magazine is London Stock Exchange Group.
