= Russia 2018 FIFA World Cup bid =

Bid to host football world cup

Russia's 2018–2022 World Cup bid logo

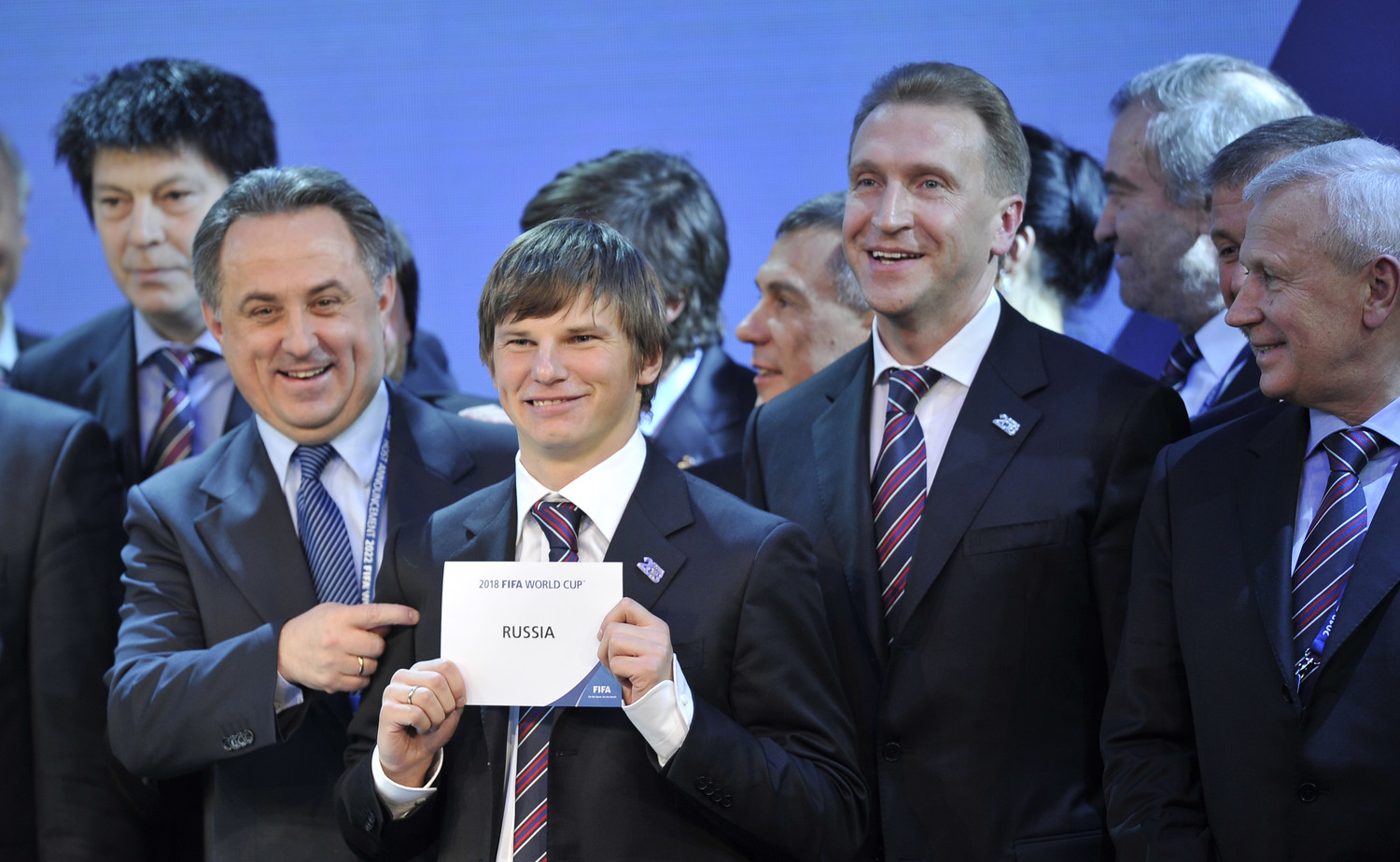
Russian bid personnel celebrate the awarding to Russia the 2018 World Cup.

Russia announced its intent to bid for the 2018 FIFA World Cup in early 2009, and submitted its request to FIFA in time. Russia's Prime Minister Vladimir Putin had taken a keen interest in the bid and had gone so far as ordering Vitaly Mutko, the Minister of Sports, to "prepare a bid for Russia to hold the 2018 World Cup". According to a report earlier submitted by Vitaly Mutko, who also served that time as President of the Russian Football Union (RFU), the country is ready to spend some $10 billion on the tournament. The bid committee also includes RFU CEO Alexey Sorokin and Alexander Djordjadze as the Director of Bid Planning and Operations. It was part of the wider delegation that presented the application, which also included Igor Shuvalov, Andrey Arshavin, Yelena Isinbayeva, Vyacheslav Koloskov, Nikita Simonyan, Sergei Fursenko, Alexey Smertin, Rinat Dasayev, Roman Abramovich, Anna Netrebko, Valery Gergiev, Natalia Vodianova, as well as the President of Tatarstan, Mintimer Shaimiev, the Head of the Republic of Mordovia, Nikolay Merkushkin, and the Governor of the Nizhny Novgorod Region, Valery Shantsev.

In October 2010, Russia formally pulled out of the race to host the 2022 FIFA World Cup. On December 2, 2010, Russia was chosen as the host country for the 2018 FIFA World Cup. Following the announcement, Prime Minister Vladimir Putin flew to Zurich to personally thank FIFA officials at FIFA headquarters after Russia's successful bid, while President Dmitry Medvedev, who played no visible role in securing the event, celebrated the decision on Twitter.

Fourteen cities are included in the current proposal, which divides them into 6 different clusters: one in the north, centered on St. Petersburg, a central cluster, centered on Moscow, a southern cluster, centered on Sochi, and the Volga River cluster. Only one city beyond the Ural Mountains is cited, Yekaterinburg. The other cities are: Kaliningrad in the north cluster, Rostov-on-Don and Krasnodar in the south cluster and Yaroslavl, Nizhny Novgorod, Kazan, Saransk, Samara and Volgograd in the Volga River cluster. The country does not currently have a stadium with 80,000 capacity, but the bid calls for the expansion of Luzhniki Stadium in Moscow, already a UEFA Elite stadium with a capacity of slightly over 78,000, to over 89,000 seats. Russia hopes to have five stadiums fit to host World Cup matches ready by 2013 — two in Moscow and one stadium each in St. Petersburg, Kazan and Sochi, which hosted the 2014 Winter Olympics.

In October 2011, Russia reduced the number of stadiums from 16 to 14. The construction of a proposed stadium in the Moscow region, Podolsk, was cancelled by the regional government, and Spartak Stadium competes with Dinamo Stadium, which was built on 27 November 2018.

== Schedule ==
Date	Notes
15 January 2009	Applications formally invited
2 February 2009	Closing date for registering intention to bid
16 March 2009	Deadline to submit completed bid registration forms
14 May 2010	Deadline for submission of full details of bid
16—19 August 2010	Inspection committee visits Russia
2 December 2010	FIFA appoint Russia as host for 2018 World Cup

== Venues ==
Proposed venues

Kaliningrad	St. Petersburg	Moscow		Ramenskoe
Proposed FIFA World Cup Stadium	Gazprom Arena	Luzhniki Stadium	Spartak Stadium	Proposed FIFA World Cup Stadium
Capacity: 45,015	Capacity: 69,501	Capacity: 81,318	Capacity: 46,990	Capacity: 44,250
Kazan	Nizhny Novgorod	Yaroslavl	Samara	Yekaterinburg
Rubin Stadium	Nizhny Novgorod Stadium	Proposed FIFA World Cup Stadium	Solidarnost Arena	Central Stadium (Yekaterinburg)
Capacity: 45,015	Capacity: 44,899	Capacity: 44,042	Capacity: 44,918	Capacity: 44,130
Volgograd	Saransk	Krasnodar	Rostov-on-Don	Sochi
Volgograd Arena	Mordovia Arena	Krasnodar Stadium	Rostov Arena	Fisht Olympic Stadium
Capacity: 45,015	Capacity: 45,015	Capacity: 50,015	Capacity: 43,702	Capacity: 47,659

== Official Bid Partners ==
- Art and Sport foundation
- IFD Kapital Group of Companies
- BDO Russia
- Russian Law Firm Yust
