= Issa Hayatou =

Cameroonian basketball player and football executive (1946–2024)

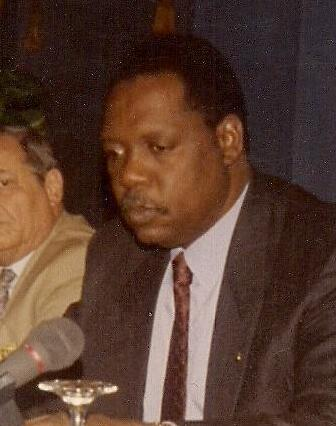

Acting President of FIFA
- In office 8 October 2015 – 26 February 2016
- Preceded by: Sepp Blatter
- Succeeded by: Gianni Infantino

Senior Vice-President of FIFA
- In office 3 July 1992 – 16 March 2017
- President: João Havelange; Sepp Blatter; Gianni Infantino
- Preceded by: General Mostafa
- Succeeded by: Ángel María Villar

5th President of CAF
- In office 10 March 1988 – 16 March 2017
- Preceded by: Abdel Halim Muhammad
- Succeeded by: Ahmad Ahmad

Honorary Member of International Olympic Committee
- In office 16 July 2001 (Hon. since 2017) – 8 August 2024
- Preceded by: List

Personal details
- Born: 9 August 1946 Garoua, French Cameroon
- Died: 8 August 2024 (aged 77) Neuilly-sur-Seine, France
- Occupation: Sportsman; Football administrator

Issa Hayatou (9 August 1946 – 8 August 2024) was a Cameroonian sports executive, athlete, and football administrator best known for serving as the president of the Confederation of African Football (CAF) between 1988 and 2017. He served as the acting FIFA president until 26 February 2016 as the previous president Sepp Blatter was banned from all football-related activities in 2015 as a part of that year's FIFA corruption investigation. In 2002, he ran for president of FIFA but was defeated by Blatter. He was also a member of the International Olympic Committee (IOC).

In November 2010 he was alleged by the BBC to have taken bribes in the 1990s regarding the awarding of World Cup television rights. The IOC announced it would investigate him. On 16 March 2017, he was defeated by Malagasy challenger Ahmad Ahmad, ending Hayatou's 29-year reign as the CAF President. On 24 May 2017, he was appointed President of the National Football Academy by the president of Cameroon, Paul Biya.

== Biography ==
=== Early life ===
Issa Hayatou was born in Garoua, in what was then French Cameroon, on 9 August 1946, the son of a local Sultan, and became a middle-distance runner and physical education teacher. Hayatou had a successful career as an athlete, becoming a member of the Cameroonian national squads in both Basketball and Athletics, and holding national record times in the 400- and 800-metre running.

=== Presidency of CAF ===
In 1974, aged just 28, he became Secretary General of the Cameroonian Football Federation, and Chair of the FA in 1986. As chair, he was chosen the same year to sit on the CAF Executive Committee. Following the retirement of Ethiopia's Ydnekatchew Tessema from the CAF presidency in August 1987, Hayatou was elected as the fifth president in the body's history. He lost his seventh re-election campaign to Ahmad Ahmad in March 2017.

President of CAF for almost three decades, Hayatou oversaw particularly successful FIFA World Cup appearances by Senegal, Nigeria, and Cameroon, and pushed for African places in the finals to increase from two to five, with the 2010 World Cup in South Africa seeing the hosts garner an automatic sixth spot for an African team. Hayatou presided over both the bid and the organising committee for the 2010 games, the first in Africa. The African Cup of Nations finals expanded from 8 to 16 teams, in a confederation of over 50 nations in six zones and five regional confederations. Club competitions have undergone a similar growth in both numbers and scale, with more clubs participating in the African Cup of Champions Clubs, the CAF Confederation Cup (begun in 2004 for national cup winners and high-placed league teams), the CAF Cup, and the CAF Super Cup. There has also been an expansion outside men's football, with the CAF overseeing youth, women's, futsal, and beach soccer competitions.

==== Relations with UEFA and FIFA ====
One of the major aims of Hayatou's presidency in the late 1990s was to provide incentives to African football clubs which would stem the flow of African players to Europe; an initiative which met with little success. Hayatou couched some criticism of the uneven flow of football 'resources' in colonial terms, saying that "rich countries import the raw material – talent – and often send their less valuable technicians", an implied criticism of foreign coaching staffs employed by most African national sides. A September 1997 initiative negotiated by Hayatou with UEFA saw the payment of fees to African governing bodies and clubs for African-born players working in Europe. This was followed by the Meridian Project signed in December 1997 with UEFA, which was to provide cash payments to African National Associations every other year, and created the UEFA–CAF Meridian Cup. The 1999 Goal Project created with FIFA gives 46 African FAs financial support worth one million dollars over four years. These negotiations, regardless of their impact on African club football, forged a close relationship between UEFA leaders and Hayatou, and led to UEFA's backing of Hayatou's nomination to replace Sepp Blatter as head of FIFA in 2002. Blatter, supported by the American and Asian confederations, defeated Hayatou by 139 votes to 56.

=== 2010 Togo suspension ===
Just days before the end of the 2010 African Cup in Angola, Hayatou found himself in the middle of a controversy after the CAF's suspension of the Togo national football team from the next two African Cup of Nations tournaments. Hayatou charged the Togolese government with interference in the Togolese Football Association's affairs when the team withdrew from the 2010 cup prior to its start. The Togolese team was attacked on 8 January 2010 while travelling to Angola by bus prior to the start of the Cup, leaving three dead and nine wounded among the Togo delegation. Togolese team captain Emmanuel Adebayor and manager Hubert Velud criticized Hayatou in particular for the CAF decision, calling on him to resign from the CAF presidency.

=== Corruption allegations ===
In November 2010 Andrew Jennings, the presenter of FIFA's Dirty Secrets, an edition of BBC's flagship current affairs programme Panorama alleged that Hayatou had taken bribes in the 1990s regarding the awarding of contracts for the sale of television rights to the football World Cup. Panorama claimed to have obtained a document from a company called ISL which showed that Hayatou was paid 100,000 French Francs by the company. ISL won the contract to distribute the television rights. Hayatou denied the allegations, saying that the money went not to him but to CAF. The IOC announced it would investigate Hayatou, due to his membership of the organisation.

In May 2011, The Sunday Times published claims from a whistle-blower that Hayatou had, along with fellow Executive Committee member Jacques Anouma, accepted $1.5 million in bribes from Qatar to secure his support for their bid for the 2022 FIFA World Cup.

=== Olympic committee confusion ===
On 21 September 2011, it was announced that FIFA had appointed Hayatou President of FIFA's Olympic committee and approved his role as chairman of the Goal Bureau. Hayatou had previously headed FIFA's Olympic committee from 1992 to 2006. At the time of his appointment, Hayatou was still under investigation for alleged bribery. It was later denied by FIFA that Hayatou had been appointed President of the Olympic committee; his apparent appointment was described as "a technical error".

=== Presidency of FIFA ===
Following the 2015 FIFA corruption case and subsequent removal of Blatter, Hayatou took charge of FIFA as acting president until 26 February 2016, when Gianni Infantino was elected to the position.

=== Death ===
Hayatou died at the American Hospital of Paris in Neuilly-sur-Seine, on 8 August 2024, a day before his 78th birthday.

== Personal life ==
Hayatou was married with four children. The Hayatou family are traditional holders of the sultanate (Lamidat, from the Sokoto Caliphate's traditional Fula title Lamine) of Garoua. Hayatou was son of the reigning sultan, and many relatives have acceded to powerful positions in Cameroonian society. Most notable was Issa's brother Sadou Hayatou, a former Prime Minister of Cameroon and longtime high official under Cameroon president Paul Biya, who was among those tapped to succeed him. The Hayatou family continue to wield much political influence in northern Cameroon.

== Awards ==
On 3 November 2007, Hayatou was awarded an honorary degree from Ladoke Akintola University of Technology in Ogbomosho, Oyo State, Nigeria.
