= Portugal–Spain 2018 FIFA World Cup bid =

Football World Cup host nation bid

Portugal and Spain bid logo for the 2018 or 2022 World Cup

Spain and Portugal 2018 initiated an official joint Iberian bid for the right to host the 2018 FIFA World Cup. The International Federation of Football Association (FIFA) invited its member associations to bid for either the 2018 or the 2022 final tournaments, or both. The Portuguese Football Federation (FPF) and the Royal Spanish Football Federation (RFEF) submitted together a bid for both editions, but with the focus on winning the privilege to host the 2018 finals. Due to the withdrawal of all non-European bids for the 2018 edition, the Spanish-Portuguese bid, and that of all other European bidding nations, were effectively considered ineligible for the 2022 campaign.

On December 2, 2010, after a vote of the FIFA Executive Committee at its headquarters in Zürich, the Iberian bid lost the 2018 hosting rights to Russia, in a two-round voting, collecting seven votes against Russian's thirteen in the final round.

== Schedule ==
Date	Notes
15 January 2009	Applications formally invited
2 February 2009	Closing date for registering intention to bid
16 March 2009	Deadline to submit completed bid registration forms
14 May 2010	Deadline for submission of full details of bid
30 August-2 September 2010	Inspection committee visits Portugal/Spain
2 December 2010	FIFA to appoint hosts for 2018 and 2022 World Cups

== Details ==
Eighteen venues across sixteen cities in Spain made the final bid package as potential host venues for the tournament. In Portugal, only the two most populous cities - Lisbon (2 venues) and Porto - earned a place in the final bid package. In all likelihood, based on the assumption that FIFA allows twelve venues for the tournament, nine venues would be allocated to Spain and the remaining three would go to Portugal.

== Potential venues ==
=== Submitted bid venues ===
The following are the 21 venues that were submitted to FIFA on 14 May 2010 as part of the FPF–RFEF's bid to host the 2018/2022 FIFA World Cup:

Barcelona, Spain	Madrid, Spain	Valencia, Spain	Madrid, Spain	Lisbon, Portugal	Sevilla, Spain
Camp Nou^{a}	Santiago Bernabéu^{a}	Nou Mestalla	Wanda Metropolitano	Estádio da Luz^{b}	La Cartuja
FC Barcelona, Spain	Real Madrid, Spain	Valencia CF (New Stadium)	Atlético Madrid, Spain	S.L. Benfica, Portugal	
Capacity: 100,000	Capacity: 80,354	Capacity: 75,000 (partially constructed)	Capacity: 73,000	Capacity: 65,647	Capacity: 57,580
Barcelona, Spain	Bilbao, Spain	Porto, Portugal	Lisbon, Portugal	Zaragoza, Spain	Badajoz, Spain
Lluís Companys	San Mamés Barria	Estádio do Dragão^{b}	Estádio José Alvalade^{b}	Nuevo Estadio de San José	Estadio Nuevo Vivero
	Athletic Bilbao (New Stadium)	F.C. Porto	Sporting CP	Real Zaragoza (New Stadium)	CD Badajoz
Capacity: 55,926	Capacity: 53,000	Capacity: 50,399	Capacity: 50,076	Capacity: 50,000 (proposed stadium : finish 2013)	Capacity: 15,198 (plans to expand to 48,000)
Santander, Spain	Málaga, Spain	A Coruña, Spain	San Sebastián, Spain	Valladolid, Spain	Vigo, Spain
El Sardinero	Nueva Rosaleda	Riazor^{a}	Anoeta	Nuevo José Zorrilla^{a}	Nuevo Balaídos^{a}
Real Racing Club	Málaga CF (New Stadium)	Deportivo de La Coruña	Real Sociedad	Real Valladolid	Celta de Vigo (New Stadium)
Capacity: 22,271 (plans to expand to 45,400)	Capacity: 45,000 (proposed stadium : finish 2016)	Capacity: 35,600 (plans to expand to 45,000)	Capacity: 32,076 (plans to expand to 43,650)	Capacity: 26,512 (plans to expand to 43,650)	Capacity: 42,381 (proposed stadium : finish 2017)
Murcia, Spain	Alicante, Spain	Gijón, Spain			
Nueva Condomina	José Rico Pérez	El Molinón ^{a}			
Real Murcia	Hércules CF	Sporting de Gijón			
Capacity: 31,179 (plans to expand to 41,000)	Capacity: 29,681 (plans to expand to 40,000)	Capacity: 25,885 (plans to expand to 40,000)			

^{a}: Stadium/site used in the 1982 FIFA World Cup.
^{b}: Stadium/site used in the UEFA Euro 2004.

=== Rejected bid venues ===
The following is a list of stadiums that were considered at one time as part of the FPF–RFEF's bid to host the 2018/2022 FIFA World Cup, but did not make the final cut:

Sevilla	Sevilla	Cornellà de Llobregat	Elche	Oviedo
Estadio Benito Villamarín	Ramón Sánchez Pizjuán	Cornellà-El Prat	Manuel Martínez Valero	Nuevo Carlos Tartiere
Real Betis	Sevilla FC	RCD Espanyol	Elche CF	Real Oviedo
Capacity: 52,745	Capacity: 45,500	Capacity: 40,500	Capacity: 36,017	Capacity: 30,500
Faro	Braga	Málaga	Villares de la Reina	Girona
Algarve	Municipal de Braga	La Rosaleda	Helmántico	Estadi Montilivi
S.C. Farense; Louletano D.C.	S.C. Braga	CD Málaga	UD Salamanca	Girona FC
Capacity: 30,305	Capacity: 30,154	Capacity: 30,044	Capacity: 17,341	Capacity: 10,500

== Aftermath ==
After losing the 2018 bid, Portugal and Spain went on to bid for the 2030 edition and was later unanimously awarded in a joint bid with Morocco giving Portugal to finally host it on their second attempt and giving Spain to host it for the second time, with centenary games to be held in the South American countries of Argentina, Paraguay and Uruguay.
