= Nugraha Besoes =

Indonesian politician (1941–2023)

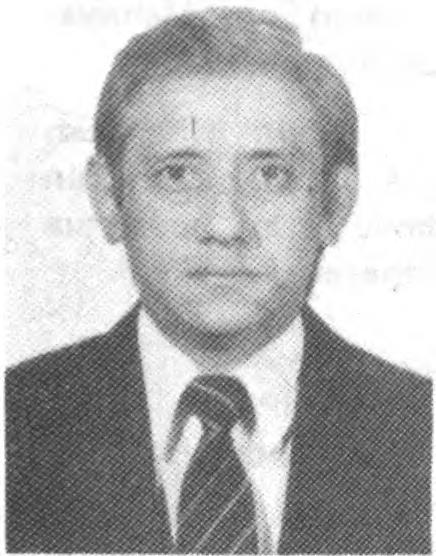
- Besoes in 1987

Secretary General of the Football Association of Indonesia
- In office 2003–2011
- Preceded by: Tri Goestoro
- Succeeded by: Tri Goestoro
- In office 1983–1999
- Preceded by: Bardosono
- Succeeded by: Tri Goestoro

Member of the People's Representative Council
- In office 1 October 1977 – 1 October 1992
- President: Suharto
- Constituency: West Java

Member of the Regional People's Representative Council of West Java
- In office 1967–1977

Personal details
- Born: 4 July 1941 Batavia, Dutch East Indies
- Died: 6 February 2023 (aged 81) Jakarta, Indonesia
- Party: Golkar
- Education: Padjadjaran University

Nugraha Besoes (4 July 1941 – 6 February 2023) was an Indonesian politician and football administrator. He was known as the "immortal secretary general" due to his longevity in holding the office of the secretary general of the Football Association of Indonesia, from 1983 until 1999 and from 2003 until 2011. He also served as a member of the People's Representative Council from 1977 until 1992.

== Early life and education ==
Besoes was born on 4 July 1941 in Jakarta. He completed his basic education at the Strada Primary School in 1953, Strada Junior High School in 1956, and Canisius High School in 1959. Besoes then continued his studies at the Padjadjaran University, where he studied business economics.

During his time in the university Besoes joined the university's student regiment and became its deputy commander from 1964 until 1966 and commander from 1966 until 1969. He was also involved in student movements and joined the Union of Jakarta Students in 1959 and the student senate of the university's economic faculty in 1962. In 1965, he became a member of the Padjajaran University's student senate and became a member of the senate's caretaker leadership in November 1965. The next year, Besoes was elected as the chairman of the student's senate. He held the position until 1969. Due to his involvement in activism and politics, it took him over a decade until he finally obtained his economics degree in 1981.

== Political career ==
Besoes began his political career in the midst of his study in the university. In 1967, he was appointed by the governor as a student representative in the West Java Regional People's Representative Council. He was elected to the council in 1971 and served for a second term. Besoes became the deputy leader of Golkar inside the council and was also elected as the chairman of the budgeting committee.

After serving for two terms in West Java's Regional People's Representative Council, Besoes was nominated by Golkar as a member of the national People's Representative Council in the 1977 election and successfully won a seat in the election. He became a member of Golkar's central executive council the next year and the secretary general of AMPI, Golkar's youth wing, in 1979. He was re-elected in 1982 and 1987.

During his first and second term, Besoes was a member of the budget committee. He became Golkar's parliamentary spokesperson during the discussion of the 1983 state budget. He was reassigned to the 6th commission, which handles industry, mining, labor, and investment, during his third term.

Following the fall of Suharto in 1998, Besoes was nominated as a candidate for the People's Representative Council in the 1999 Indonesian legislative election. He failed to receive enough votes and was not elected. Besoes attempted to run as a candidate for the Regional Representative Council (DPD) in the 2009 elections, but failed to pass the selection process. Besoes later became the campaign manager for former minister Ginandjar Kartasasmita, who was also running for DPD.

== Football administration career ==
Besoes started his involvement in football administration in the 1970s as the secretary of the Persib Bandung football club. After a brief tenure, Besoes was invited to join the Football Association of Indonesia (PSSI) by Maulwi Saelan, the association's chairman. He then became the association's head of development.

He was elected as the secretary general (Note: The post of secretary general during Besoes's term had two different names in Indonesian: sekretaris umum from 1983 until 1999 and sekretaris jenderal from 2003 until 2011. Both translate to secretary general in English.) of the Football Association of Indonesia in 1983 with Kardono as the association's president. Besoes retained his post of general secretary after Kardono was replaced by Azwar Anas in 1991. A football scandal that involved the Indonesia national football team occurred a year before the end of his term and both Besoes and Azwar resigned from their positions. Besoes became secretary general again in 2003 under the leadership of Nurdin Halid.

A year after the start of his term as secretary general under Halid, Besoes temporarily took over the chairmanship from Halid after Halid was arrested on corruption charges. Besoes then attempted to appoint another temporary officeholder in order to prevent an extraordinary election from being held. Besoes's attempt was criticized by various football observers, but nevertheless he made the appointment. The composition between an acting chairman and Besoes was retained until Halid was re-elected as chairman in 2007.

The election of Halid, who at that time had been twice convicted, sparked controversy amongst PSSI members, and some of them forced him to resign. Besoes, who was sent to negotiate with ASEAN Football Federation and FIFA, initially managed to prevent Halid from being replaced. However, in late 2007 FIFA decided to revoke its recognition of Halid's reelection, prompting PSSI to amend its statute in accordance with FIFA's standard. PSSI's failure to amend its statute led FIFA to send a warning letter to Besoes about the amendment's deadline. Besoes was also pressed to remove Halid from his position as chairman by Minister of Sports and Youth Adhyaksa Dault and demonstrators, but Nugraha claimed that it was beyond his capacity. Eventually, after failing to meet FIFA's deadline several times, the statute was finally revised in compliance with FIFA standards, and further negotiations between Besoes and FIFA secured Halid's chairmanship.

Besoes's second term as Halid's secretary general was marred by bribery case inside PSSI's discipline committee, which led to the resignation of two of its members. He also sent a bid to FIFA for Indonesia to sponsor the 2018 and 2022 FIFA World Cup, but later cancelled and supported Australia's bid instead. In 2011, Besoes was sued by the manager of Persebaya Surabaya football club for lying about FIFA and AFC's instruction to cancel PSSI's congress. Besoes told FIFA and AFC delegates that the security situation during the congress was dire and claimed that riots occurred during the congress. Due to the incident, Besoes resigned from his position on 11 April 2011, and handed over his secretary-generalship to Joko Driyono.

== Personal life and death ==
Besoes was married to Maryamah Besoes and had a child. Maryamah was elected as a member of the People's Representative Council in 2004.

Besoes died at the National Brain Center Hospital in Jakarta on 6 February 2023, at the age of 81. He was buried on the same day.
