= Indonesia 2022 FIFA World Cup bid =

Football World Cup host nation bid

The Indonesia 2022 FIFA World Cup bid was the first official bid from the Football Association of Indonesia (PSSI) to host the FIFA World Cup. FIFA rejected the bid for lack of government support on 19 March 2010. Indonesia was one of four Asian countries bidding to bring the tournament to Asia for a second time, the 2002 tournament having been played in Japan and South Korea. Indonesia, under the name of the Dutch East Indies, had been the first Asian nation to compete in the World Cup, when they participated in the 1938 event, and they lost to Hungary in the first round.

Indonesia's 2018–2022 World Cup Bid logo.

== Bid committee ==
The chairman of the bid committee was Ginandjar Kartasasmita, the chairman of the Indonesian senate, and the vice chairman was Gita Wirjawan from Pertamina, a national oil and gas company. The committee also included: Syarief Bastaman, Joko Driyono, Hamka Kady, Fauzi Bowo, Hayono Isman, Nirwan Dermawan Bakrie, and Josef Refo.

The bid was launched at a time when there was pressure from Indonesian football fans to Nurdin Halid to step down from his position as the chairman of PSSI. The bid itself was used by Jusuf Kalla in his campaign to gain support for his presidential candidacy in 2009, though his effort was unsuccessful.

== Bid rejection ==
Indonesia was alone among the bidding nations in not having official government backing, although some support was offered in a 2009 interview by previous Youth and Sports Minister, Adhyaksa Dault. On 19 March 2010, FIFA announced that Indonesia's bid had been rejected, because required documents and guarantees had not been provided, as the government felt that the bid would not gain popular support in the country.

== Proposed venues ==
Jakarta		Surakarta	Semarang
Gelora Bung Karno	Jakarta BMW	Manahan	Jatidiri
Capacity: 77,193	Capacity: 75,000 (new stadium)	Capacity: 70,000 (upgraded)	Capacity: 60,000 (upgraded)
Samarinda	Palembang	Surabaya	Bogor
Palaran	Gelora Sriwijaya	Gelora Bung Tomo	Pakansari
Capacity: 67,075	Capacity: 55,000 (upgraded)	Capacity: 55,000	Capacity: 50,000 (upgraded)
Jayapura	Stadium locations in the Indonesia 2022 FIFA World Cup bid.		Denpasar
Mandala	Stadium locations in the Indonesia 2022 FIFA World Cup bid.		Ngurah Rai
Capacity: 50,000 (upgraded)	Stadium locations in the Indonesia 2022 FIFA World Cup bid.		Capacity: 45,000 (upgraded)
Banda Aceh	Stadium locations in the Indonesia 2022 FIFA World Cup bid.		Pekanbaru
Harapan Bangsa	Stadium locations in the Indonesia 2022 FIFA World Cup bid.		Riau Main
Capacity: 45,000	Stadium locations in the Indonesia 2022 FIFA World Cup bid.		Capacity: 43,923
Sleman	Balikpapan	Bandung	Kutai Kartanegara
Maguwoharjo	Batakan	Gelora Bandung Lautan Api	Aji Imbut
Capacity: 40,000 (upgraded)	Capacity: 40,000 (new stadium)	Capacity: 38,000	Capacity: 35,000
