= Rafael Salguero =

Guatemalan football administrator

- Born: Rafael Salguero Sandoval; 3 December 1946 (age 79)
- Known for: Former member of FIFA Executive Committee

Rafael Salguero Sandoval (born 3 December 1946) is a Guatemalan football administrator and a former member of the FIFA Executive Committee.

In 2016, Salguero pleaded guilty to multiple corruption charges after admitting he accepting a bribe in return for his vote for the 2018 World Cup. After spending three years under house arrest, he was eventually fined 100,000 CHF and banned from FIFA for 7 years.
