= Japan 2022 FIFA World Cup bid =

Bid by Japan to host football world cup

The Japan 2022 FIFA World Cup bid was the second official bid from the Japan Football Association (JFA) to host the FIFA World Cup. Had this bid been successful (the bid was won by Qatar), Japan would have been hosting their second World Cup Finals and it would have been their first solo hosting since they shared the 2002 FIFA World Cup with other co-host South Korea, becoming the sixth nation to host the tournament twice, after Italy, France, Mexico, Brazil and (West) Germany. On May 4, 2010, the Japanese Football Association Bid team decided to concentrate solely on winning the right to host the 2022 FIFA World Cup.

Japan's 2022 World Cup bid logo

== Schedule ==
Date	Notes
15 January 2009	Applications formally invited
2 February 2009	Closing date for registering intention to bid
16 March 2009	Deadline to submit completed bid registration forms
14 May 2010	Deadline for submission of full details of bid
19-22 July 2010	Inspection committee visits Japan
2 December 2010	FIFA appoints Russia host for 2018 and Qatar for 2022 World Cup.

== Candidate venues ==
12 stadiums are proposed.

Yokohama	Saitama	Fukuroi	Osaka	Toyota	Ōita
International Stadium Yokohama^{a}	Saitama Stadium 2002^{a}	Shizuoka 'ECOPA' Stadium^{a}	Nagai Stadium^{a} or Umeda Kita-yard Stadium	Toyota Stadium	Ōita Stadium^{a}
Capacity: 70,000	Capacity: 63,000	Capacity: 50,000	Capacity: Nagai: 47,000	Capacity: 45,000	Capacity: 43,000
Niigata	Kashima	Kobe	Sapporo	Tokyo	
Niigata Stadium^{a}	Kashima Soccer Stadium^{a}	Kobe Wing Stadium^{a}	Sapporo Dome^{a}	National Stadium	Ajinomoto Stadium
Capacity: 42,300	Capacity: 42,000	Capacity: 42,000	Capacity: 42,000	Capacity: 50,000	Capacity: 50,000

^{a}: Stadium/site used in 2002 FIFA World Cup

== 3D and holographic simulcasts ==
Japan pledged that if it had been granted the rights to host the 2022 World Cup games, it would develop technology enabling it to provide a live international telecast of the event in 3D, which would allow 400 stadiums in 208 countries to provide 360 million people with real-time 3D coverage of the games projected on giant screens, captured in 360 degrees by 200 HD cameras. Furthermore, Japan will broadcast the games in holographic format if the technology to do so is available by that time. Beyond allowing the world's spectators to view the games on flat screens projecting 3D imaging, holographic projection would project the games onto stadium fields, creating a greater illusion of actually being in the presence of the players. Microphones embedded below the playing surface would record all sounds, such as ball kicks, in order to add to the sense of realism.

Japan's bidding team has enlisted pioneering technology scientist Jun Murai of Keio University in their plans to host the games. The country demonstrated holographic display technology at the 2009 NAB Show using integral cameras (sometimes referred to as 8K) and wavefront reconstruction, and Murai has stated that Japan could develop the means for the necessary technologies to be realized by 2016. Murai and committee managing director Takato Maruyama have stated they are confident that the endeavor is feasible. The event would be co-organized with South Korea.

In addition to projection, "translation earpieces" would be available to allow fans of different nations to converse with each other. Devices would also be available which would allow people to instantly capture information about players by pointing at them.

== Power sources ==
The events would be powered in part by attendees, via equipment that would harvest energy created by their footsteps. It would also obtain energy from solar panels.

== Industry ramifications ==
If Japan had been awarded the 2022 World Cup, providing it with the initiative to realize the proposed technologies, it could drive private companies to develop them as well, in order to stay in competition in the industry, resulting in accelerated development of the medium. Maruyama expressed his belief that with the advent of such technologies, public viewings at stadiums would increase attendance there by several ten-fold.

== Official bid partners ==
- Adidas
- Asahi Shimbun
- Fuji Television
- Japan Airlines
- JTB Global Marketing & Travel
- Kinki Nippon Tourist
- Kirin Brewery Company
- Nikkei Inc.
- Nintendo
- Nippon Television
- Nishitetsu Travel
- Nisshin OilliO Group
- Pia Corp.
- Sankei Shimbun
- Sony
- SKY Perfect JSAT Corporation
- Tokyo Broadcasting System
- Toppan Printing
- TV Asahi
- TV Tokyo
- Uniqlo
