= Geoff Thompson (football executive) =

Chairman of the Football Association

Geoff Thompson OBE
- Born: 23 August 1945 (age 80); Sheffield, England
- Occupation: Football administrator

Geoffrey Thompson OBE (born 23 August 1945) is the former chairman of the Football Association, and a vice-president of both UEFA and FIFA. He has long been associated with football especially in South Yorkshire, having previously been general manager of Doncaster Rovers and held senior positions in the Sheffield & Hallamshire Football Association. He was elected chairman of the FA in 1999, a post he held until January 2008. He is a magistrate.

On 16 May 2010 he replaced Lord Triesman as the head of England's bid to host the 2018 World Cup, after Triesman stepped down due to allegations of him accusing fellow World Cup 2018 hopefuls Russia and Spain of using bribery in the 2010 World Cup in South Africa.
