= Adrian Bevington =

English football executive

- Born: c. 1971; Middlesbrough, England
- Occupation: Football executive
- Years active: 1987–present
- Employer: Aberdeen F.C.
- Known for: Club England Managing Director at the Football Association (2010–2015)
- Title: Chief Executive of Aberdeen F.C. (2026–present)

Adrian Bevington (born c. 1971) is a sports industry professional who was Club England Managing Director at the Football Association (the FA) from 2010 to 2015. In total Bevington spent 17 years with The FA (where he was also Group Communications Director). He is currently Chief Executive at Aberdeen Football Club. Additionally he has enjoyed two spells working with Middlesbrough FC and also worked closely with the Welsh FA, Nottingham Forest, Aston Villa and UEFA.

== Career ==
Bevington was born in Middlesbrough and started his career at ICI as a trainee on the company newspaper C&P News in 1987. A Middlesbrough fan, he also represented a successful Middlesbrough Schoolboys side as a teenager and joined the club's media team after ICI.

While he was at Middlesbrough, the club under Bryan Robson as player-manager and chairman Steve Gibson and CEO Keith Lamb were promoted to the Premier League, winning what is now the Championship in 1995, opened the Riverside Stadium, reached the club's first FA and League Cup Final's in 1997. With capacity crowds, the club signed numerous international stars such as Juninho, Fabrizio Ravanelli, Emerson, Paul Merson and Mark Schwarzer. Following a controversial relegation in May 1997, Bevington was instrumental in a creative season ticket campaign that ensured the Riverside Stadium was season ticket sell out for the 1997-98 campaign in the second tier.

At Middlesbrough FC he wrote several books on the club, one with fellow press officer Dave Allen, "From Doom to Boom: The Most Dramatic Decade in the Life of Middlesbrough FC" (Hardback, Mainstream Publishing 1996), about the dramatic rebirth of Middlesbrough F.C. following their financial woes in 1986.

He joined the FA's communications division in 1997, then being promoted to the role of Head of Media and Group Director of Communications when in his early 30s (the youngest in the organisation's history).

A key achievement during this period was driving interest in the England U21 team on the road around the country with record crowds on a consistent basis under Peter Taylor and Howard Wilkinson and much larger crowds and media coverage of the England development teams.

While at The English FA, Bevington was part of the Senior Executive Management Team for a decade and directly involved in the opening of Wembley Stadium and St George's Park. In his role as Club England Managing Director, he was responsible for the operational management of 24 England teams. He worked at five World Cups and three European Championships (men); Successfully negotiated England team tournament and commercial bonuses and represented The FA internationally at numerous events globally. 

As Club England Managing Director, working closely with FA Chairman David Bernstein, he introduced monthly management meetings that for the first time included all senior football personnel and key executive and board members to develop a more cohesive way of working.

During this period he played a key role in record breaking commercial deals such as Nike, worked closely with broadcasters and was executive lead for The FA's 150th anniversary in 2013. This included delivering an exciting series of fixtures at Wembley and taking a senior men's England team to South America for the first time since 1984. 

Bevington was a member of the UEFA media committee and also tournament director for the UEFA Women U17 tournament in 2013. He was also integral to the first England Women's game to be hosted at Wembley in 2013 (played in front a of a capped capacity crowd v Germany) and the organisation's lead person across the Team GB football operation for London 2012.

He was directly involved in the recruitment process of several coaches for the men's and women's senior team and directly responsible for appointing Gareth Southgate U21 Head Coach. During his tenure as Club England MD he was instrumental in the return of England to the Toulon tournament, also England's first UEFA tournament win (U17s) for a decade, while the England DNA was launched during this time.

Throughout his time with The English FA, Adrian Bevington was regarded as one of the most recognisable senior figures. Frequently fronting up for the organisation publicly - making and/or explaining policy decisions, or during times of major football news issues around the England men's team. 

After taking the decision to leave The FA after 17 years at the end of 2014, Bevington launched his own sports consultancy. Clients included: Football Association of Wales - Tournament Advisor for one year leading into the 2016 UEFA European Championships; Nottingham Forest FC - Advisor to owner and consultant CEO for one season, where it is understood he declined the offer to become permanent CEO; Aston Villa - Appointed to a new football board in an overarching Sporting Director role for a short period with David Bernstein and Lord Mervyn King prior to the club's sale under Randy Lerner; Working with Andrea Radrzzani as he purchased Leeds United and the Eisner family as they bought Portsmouth FC; Bevington also worked as consultant with Pitch International LLP; Dugout; UEFA; Middlesbrough FC; West Ham United; Watford and Charlton Athletic.

On 22 May 2018, it was announced by Middlesbrough that Bevington had joined the club as Head of Recruitment Operations - a broad senior management role that covered many of the responsibilities of Sporting/Executive Director. During this time Bevington worked directly with CEO Neil Bausor and Owner/Chairman Steve Gibson, leading on all football business at the club. It is understood he devised a new strategic approach for the football side of the club during this time. Bevington chose to leave the role in December 2019.

While Bevington was at Middlesbrough, there was a reduction in transfer expenditure, while transfer sales included those of Adama Traore (Wolves); Ben Gibson (Burnley); Patrick Bamford (Leeds); Fabio (Nantes); Darren Randolph (West Ham); Martin Braithwaite (CD Leganes); Aiden Flint (Cardiff). Other high profile players such as Stewart Downing (Blackburn); Grant Leadbitter (Sunderland) and John Obi Mikel also left the club. 

With Tony Pulis as Manager, Middlesbrough finished 7th in the EFL Championship, missing out on a play-off place by one point behind Derby County in a highly competitive division with Aston Villa, West Brom and Leeds also in the play-off's while, Sheffield United and Norwich were promoted automatically. Pulis left Middlesbrough that summer and the club appointed assistant coach and former player Jonathan Woodgate as Head Coach.

A greater focus was placed on developing and signing younger players on lower fees and salaries, particularly in the summer of 2019. Players signed on professional contracts during this period included Nathan Wood; Djed Spence; Billal Brahimi; Isiah Jones, while Anfernee Dijksteel joined the club from Charlton Athletic.

Bevington worked as an advisor across the football industry after leaving Middlesbrough FC. He has advised numerous companies on new business into football, worked with players, coaches and agents. Also involved in and around the mergers and acquisitions of clubs. Additionally, Bevington has regularly been a contributor to various UK and international broadcasters, such as Sky Sports; BBC and Talksport.

He also became a non-executive director of the North Riding FA, during a period of significant modernisation to the board structure and policies.

In September 2021, Bevington accepted an invitation to join the board at Hartlepool United as a Non-Executive Director. A volunteer board level position, where he was not employed by the club or involved on a day to day level, he stepped down after one year due to foreseeable future conflict of interests with other work.

In December 2022 he took up his current role as UK Managing Director of German owned international football agency Pro Profil. This has seen the agency develop a footprint with a particular focus on young emerging talent within the UK. Bevington has also been directly involved in the international transfers of players outside of the UK market in Europe and the Middle East. 

Bevington has also worked closely with The Football Transfer Forum event for a number of years, with a set-piece interview with senior figures from the game. He has been a regular contributor to the VSI Sporting Director and CEO programmes and UCFB. Bevington was also regular Sports Industry Award judge; frequently appeared in the PR Week Powerbook and continues to be a Sports Journalism Awards judge.

He received the North East Football Writers' Bob Cass award for services to North East Football in 2019. 

Some of the managers that Bevington has worked directly with include: Sven-Goran Eriksson, Fabio Capello, Gareth Southgate, Bryan Robson, Howard Wilkinson, Chris Coleman, Steve McClaren, Roy Hodgson, Peter Taylor, David Platt, Chris Ramsey, Hope Powell, Stuart Pearce and Tony Pulis. Also Sir Trevor Brooking, Les Reed, Dan Ashworth and John McDermott within The FA Technical Department and Osian Roberts at The FAW.
