= Peter Kenyon =

British businessman (born 1954)

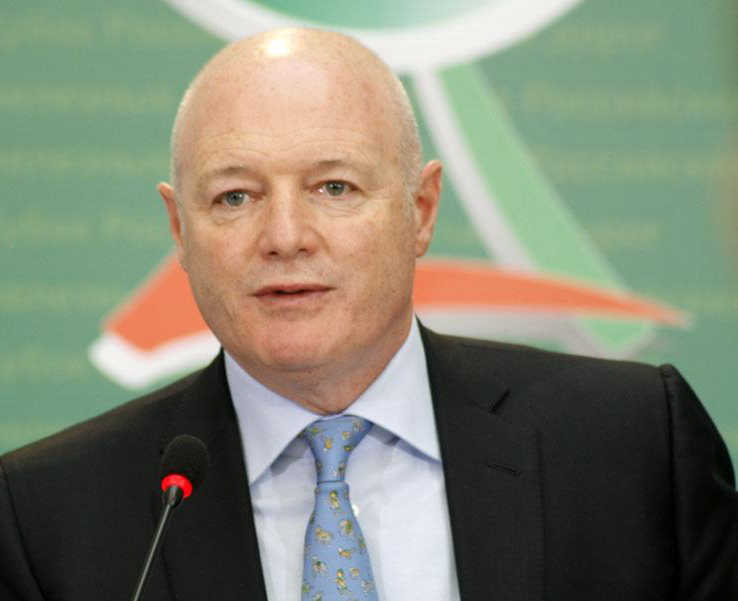
Peter Kenyon

Peter Kenyon (born 1954 in Stalybridge, Cheshire) is a British businessman who has served as the chief executive of English Premier League football clubs Manchester United and Chelsea, where he has been involved in contentious transfer dealings.

== Early life ==
Kenyon was educated in Tameside at West Hill School and King's School, Macclesfield.

== Career ==
Kenyon was a director and chief executive of sportswear firm Umbro.

=== Manchester United ===
In 1997, Kenyon took up the role of deputy chief executive at the club he supported as a boy, Manchester United, where he sat on the Board of Directors. He was promoted to chief executive in August 2000 following the departure of Martin Edwards. Kenyon was influential in persuading long-serving manager Alex Ferguson to remain at the club despite Ferguson's original intention to retire in 2002. One of the other notable aspects of Kenyon's time in charge was that the club dismissed their rigid wage structure and spent large sums of money on players such as Juan Sebastián Verón and Rio Ferdinand.

=== Chelsea ===
In 2003, Kenyon moved to Chelsea, which was seen as controversial as he had previously proclaimed himself as a lifelong Manchester United supporter.

At Chelsea, Kenyon was involved in high-profile incidents, including an attempt to persuade the manager of the England national team Sven-Göran Eriksson to become manager of Chelsea, and the tapping-up of former Arsenal and England left-back Ashley Cole.

On 16 September 2009, Chelsea announced that Kenyon would be leaving his chief executive role at Chelsea at the end of October.

=== Third-party ownership ===
On 22 September 2014, an investigation by The Guardian implicated Kenyon and Portuguese superagent Jorge Mendes in breaching FIFA regulations regarding third-party ownership and conflict of interest in player representation, buying player rights through companies based in Jersey and Ireland. The Guardian also published a detailed report showing Kenyon's ex-club Chelsea have invested in third party ownership via Mendes and Kenyon, a practice banned by the Premier League. Chelsea declined to comment on the accusations.
