= Jacques Anouma =

Ivorian football administrator

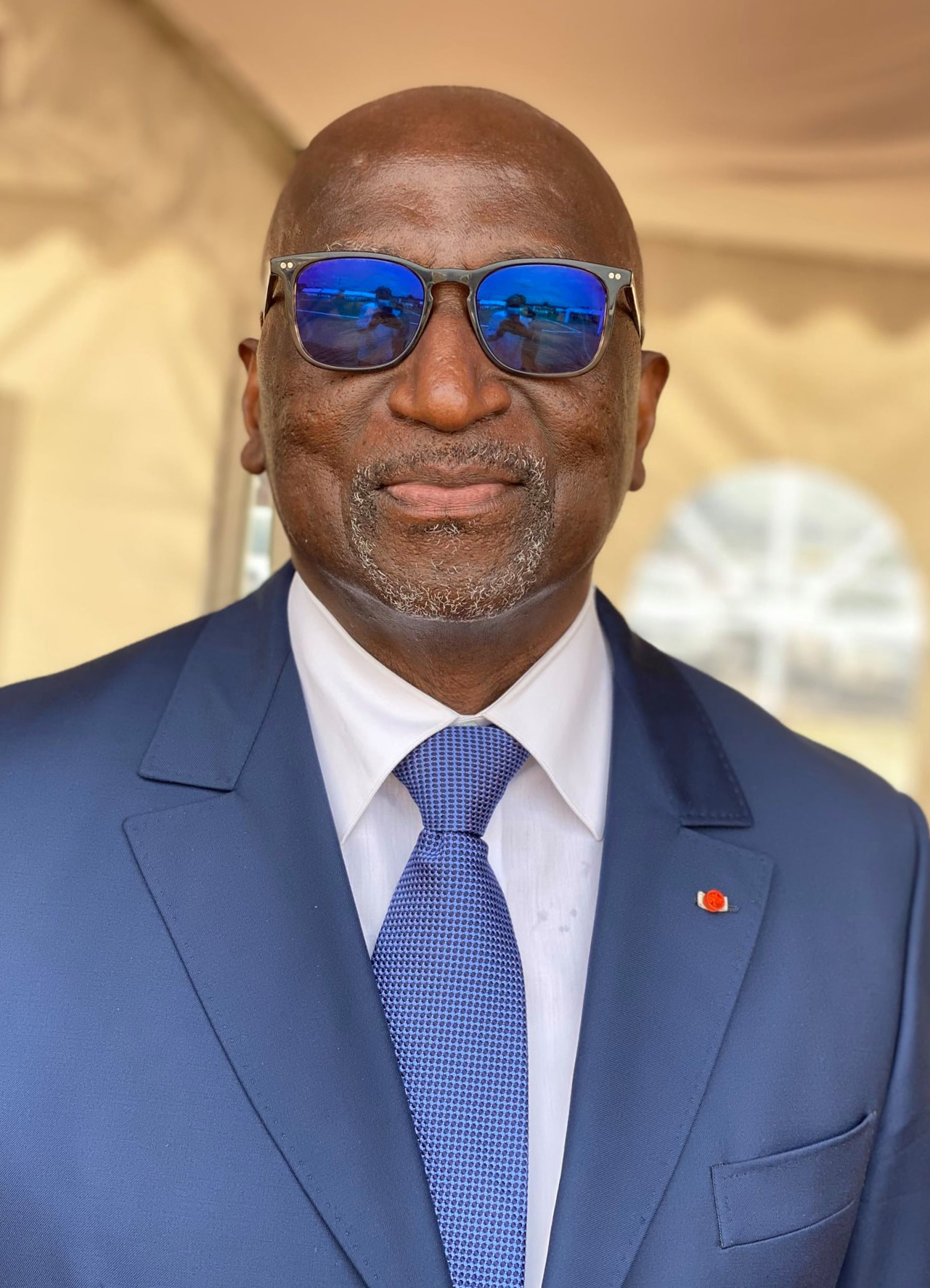
- Born: 11 December 1951 (age 74); Alépé, Côte d'Ivoire
- Known for: Former member of FIFA Executive Committee

Jacques Anouma (born 11 December 1951) is a football administrator and a former member of the FIFA Executive Committee.
