= Alain Courtois =

Belgian politician (born 1951)

Senator
- In office 28 June 2007 – June 2011

Personal details
- Born: 12 June 1951 (age 75) Schaerbeek
- Party: MR

Alain Courtois (French pronunciation: [alɛ̃ kuʁtwa]; born 12 June 1951) is a Belgian politician. Born in Schaerbeek, he is Secretary General of the Belgian Football Association (URBSFA). He has served as a replacement minister on several occasions.

He was the federally appointed Reformist Movement—Citizens' Movement for Change representative of the Brussels-Halle-Vilvoorde district from 26 June 2003 to 12 February 2004, replacing Daniel Ducarme, who became Minister-President of the Brussels-Capital Region and minister of Arts, Letters and Audio-visual of the French Community of Belgium. From 19 February 2004 to 28 June 2004 he served as a replacement for Jacques Simonet, who replaced Ducarme in the Minister-President post following a scandal. Since 1 July 2004 he has served as a replacement for Martine Payfa, who was elected to the Belgian Federal Parliament from the Brussels-Capital Region. He was elected as a member of the Belgian Senate in 2007.

Courtois is a supporter of football in Belgium, and is a frequent commentator on the RTL sports radio program "Vasyavoirdusport." He led the organizing committee of 2000 UEFA European Championship, which was held jointly in Belgium and the Netherlands. In 2006, he was named to lead the Benelux bid for the 2018 FIFA World Cup, known as Beltomundial. He also led Brussels' successful bid to host the Grand Départ of the 2019 Tour de France.
