= Infantino =

Infantino is an Italian surname of Sicilian origin. Notable people with the surname include:

- Antonio Infantino (born 1991), Italian sprinter
- Carmine Infantino (1925–2013), American comic book artist
- Gianni Infantino (born 1970), Swiss-Italian football administrator, president of FIFA from 2016
- Gino Infantino (born 2003), Argentine football player
- Lorenzo Infantino (1948–2025), Italian philosopher and economist
- Luigi Infantino (1921–1991), Italian operatic tenor
- Rafael Infantino (born 1984), Colombian cyclist
