= 69th FIFA Congress =

Meeting of FIFA's supreme legislative body

2019 FIFA presidential election
- 5 June 2019
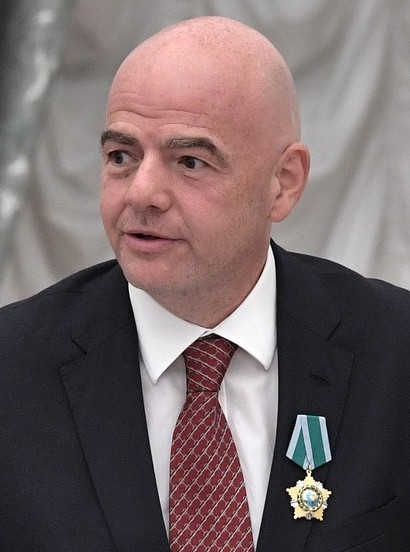
Candidate	Gianni Infantino
Popular vote	Acclamation
President before election
(Switzerland) / (Italy) Gianni Infantino
Elected president
(Switzerland) / (Italy) Gianni Infantino

The 69th FIFA Congress was held on 5 June 2019 at the Paris Expo Porte de Versailles in Paris, France. The main event was the 2019 FIFA presidential election, where Gianni Infantino was reelected unopposed by acclamation for a second term.

== Background ==
The FIFA Congress is the annual gathering of representatives from all FIFA member associations. It serves as the organization's supreme legislative body and is responsible for electing the FIFA President, approving budgets, and making changes to statutes.

== 2019 presidential election ==
On 13 June 2018, during the 68th FIFA Congress in Moscow, Gianni Infantino announced his intention to seek a second term. By the 5 February 2019 deadline, no other candidates had filed nominations, making him the sole contender for the presidency. He was therefore reelected by acclamation on 5 June 2019 during the 69th Congress in Paris.

=== Voting results ===
As Infantino was the only candidate, a vote was not conducted. Instead, he was confirmed for another term by a show of acclamation from the member associations present.
