= Layan Jouhari =

Saudi footballer (born 2001)

Personal information
- Full name: Layan Abdulmojeeb Jouhari
- Date of birth: 12 January 2001 (age 25)
- Place of birth: Saudi Arabia
- Positions: Defender; midfielder

Team information
- Current team: Al-Ittihad
- Number: 18

Senior career*
Years	Team	Apps	(Gls)
2021–2022	Jeddah Eagles		
2022–	Al-Ittihad		

International career
2022–	Saudi Arabia		
- * Club domestic league appearances and goals

Layan Abdulmojeeb Jouhari (Arabic: لَيَان عَبْد الْمُجِيب جَوْهَرِيّ; born 12 January 2001) is a Saudi footballer who plays as a defender and midfielder for Saudi Women's Premier League side Al-Ittihad. She has also played for the Saudi Arabia women's national football team since its first matches in 2022.

== Club career ==
Jouhari played with Jeddah Eagles in the SAFF Women's National Football Championship.

After Al-Ittihad acquired Jeddah Eagles in 2022, Jouhari played in the 2022–23 Saudi Women's Premier League.

In April 2023, Al-Ittihad renewed Jouhari's contract for two seasons and she played with them in the 2023–24 Saudi Women's Premier League.

By 2025, Jouhari was playing in midfield. In August that year, Al-Ittihad renewed her contract through 2026, along with Talah Al-Ghamdi's.

== International career ==
In February 2022, Layan Jouhari was named as part of the first-ever Saudi Arabia women's national football team for the two friendlies against Seychelles and Maldives.

National team coach Lluís Cortés named her as a participant in a 27-player camp running from 25 May to 12 June 2025 in Taif, ahead of the 2026 AFC Women's Asian Cup qualifiers in Cambodia.

== Personal life ==
Jouhari's uncle, Ghanayem Al-Harbi, played for Al-Ittihad for almost a decade during the 1960s and 1970s and went on to work as an assistant coach under Carlos Alberto Parreira with the Saudi Arabian national team when the Green Falcons won the AFC Asian Cup in 1988. Her father, Abdulmojeeb, also represented Al-Ittihad, but in different sports, playing both volleyball and table tennis for the Jeddah club.

Her sister Dina Jouhari plays football for NEOM SC in the Saudi Women's First Division League.

In 2023, she appeared in a FIFA+ documentary about Saudi women's football, Destined to Play.

Layan Jouhari was the voice of Saudi Arabia's bid for the 2034 FIFA World Cup in a promotional film released by the Saudi Arabian Football Federation.
