= Concerns and controversies at the 2014 Winter Olympics =

There were many concerns and controversies at the 2014 Winter Olympics in Sochi. There were disputes with Circassians, who demanded the events be cancelled or moved unless Russia apologized for the 19th century Circassian genocide, environmental and economic issues, lack of political stability and governance, and the safety and human rights of LGBT athletes and journalists, in light of Russia's "gay propaganda" laws, which sparked Olympic-focused protests. However, all of these events were overshadowed by the massive Russian state-sponsored doping program uncovered in the aftermath of the Games.

== Circassian genocide ==
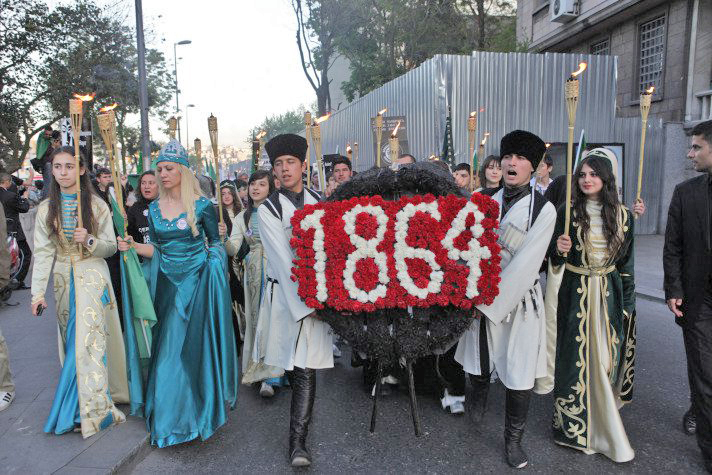
Circassians in Turkey commemorate the Circassian genocide in Taksim, Istanbul

Circassian organisations have spoken out against the Olympics, arguing that the Games will take place on land that had been inhabited by them since the beginning of recorded history by their ancestors until 1864, when the resolution of the Russo-Circassian War was stated to have caused the disappearance (variously by death or deportation) of around 800,000–1,500,000 Circassians. They demanded the Sochi 2014 Olympics be cancelled or moved unless Russia apologises for the Circassian genocide. Some Circassian groups have not expressed outright opposition to the Olympics but argue that symbols of Circassian history and culture should be included in the format, as Australia, the United States, and Canada did for their indigenous populations in 2000, 2002, and 2010 respectively.

The games are viewed to be particularly offensive because they include the date of the 150th anniversary of the Circassian genocide. It has thus been a rallying cry for Circassian nationalists.

In particular, there is much ire over the use of a hill called "Red Hill". In 1864, a group of Circassians tried to return home but were attacked and a battle ensued, ending in their massacre, and attaining the name "Red Hill" (for the blood spilled). There were skiing and snowboarding events planned to be held on this hill.

== Human rights ==
On 30 January 2014, nine Amnesty International European directors delivered a petition in Moscow to the offices of Russian President Vladimir Putin calling on him to repeal a series of laws restricting the right to freedom of speech, freedom of assembly and freedom of association in the run up to the 2014 Winter Olympics. The organization felt that the laws were no substitute for an effective justice system, and demanded the Russian authorities to release immediately and unconditionally all prisoners of conscience (POCs). The Russian parliament passed an amnesty bill that freed the imprisoned Pussy Riot singers, the foreign activists amongst Greenpeace's "Arctic 30" and the 2012 Bolotnaya Square protest.

Human Rights Watch has repeatedly presented the IOC detailed evidence of documented human rights abuses linked to Russia's preparations for the 2014 Winter Games since 2009. Human Rights Watch have documented exploitation of migrant workers in violation of Russian law; evictions of residents without fair compensation and in some cases, with no compensation at all. Many resettled residents lost a portion of their livelihoods; Threats, harassment, and lawsuits of activists and journalists critical of the Games, as well as Russia's discriminatory anti-LGBT propaganda law. Not before late 2013 the Russian government and IOC covered $8.34 million in wage arrears.

Both German president Joachim Gauck and European Commissioner for Justice, Fundamental Rights and Citizenship Viviane Reding publicly boycotted the Games over human rights abuses, with Reding specifically citing Russia's treatment of minorities.

On 21 January 2014 Russian authorities sentenced left activist Vladislav Ryazantsev to 15 days. Ryazantsev is one of the leaders of the Left Front movement. He has been arrested allegedly for swearing at a bus stop late one evening. Vladislav Ryazantsev and his fellow activists had planned to hold an action under the slogan of boycott of Sochi Olympics.

On 5 February 2014 Russian authorities sentenced environmental activist Igor Kharchenko to five days. Kharchenko is member of the Russian NGO Environmental Watch for North Caucasus (Ecologicheskaya Vakhta po Severnomu Kavkazu). He has been arrested and his car was vandalized. Sergei Nikitin, Amnesty International's Moscow Office Director said: "The Russian authorities must halt their harassment of civil society activists, protect the right to peaceful freedom of expression, and release the Sochi prisoners of conscience: Igor Kharchenko and his fellow environmentalist Yevgeny Vitishko, who is currently serving 15 days in administrative detention on trumped-up charges."

Evgeny Vitishko was arrested for 15 days in the Sochi area reportedly charged allegedly for swearing at a bus stop. Yevgeniy Vitishko and his fellow activists have been actively involved in protests regarding the deforestation and illegal construction and fencing in areas of protected forest around Sochi. AI is concerned about his unfair trial resulted in a court decision to send him to prison colony for three years.

=== Police arrests ===
Two members of the punk group Pussy Riot, Nadezhda Tolokonnikova and Maria Alekhina, and a group of activists and journalists were arrested by Russian police in Sochi when simply walking down the street. Pussy Riot members have urged politicians attending the Winter Olympics to criticise human rights abuses in Russia. According to Amnesty International people are being targeted for peacefully speaking their minds. Almost daily there are reports of arrests of activists in Sochi and the Olympic Games area including Semyon Simonov Memorial, David Hakim and journalists from Radio Free Europe and Novaya Gazeta. Amnesty demanded the International Olympic Committee to condemn the arrests.

=== LGBT rights ===
The rights of LGBT people in Russia were a concern leading up to the Games (where seven openly lesbian and bisexual athletes, all female, were scheduled to participate). Russia became the subject of international criticism following the signing of a federal law by Vladimir Putin in June 2013, which banned the distribution of "propaganda of non-traditional sexual relationships" among minors. Mass media classified the legislation as being "anti-gay", while LGBT rights activists considered the law to be too broad and vague, characterizing it as an effective ban on promoting LGBT rights and culture. Human Rights Campaign (HRC) president Chad Griffin argued that even kissing a same-sex partner or displaying LGBT symbols such as the rainbow flag could be illegal under the law. The legislation was also attributed to an increase in homophobic violence in Russia by anti-gay and Neo-Nazi groups. Critics also considered the law to be inconsistent with principle six of the Olympic Charter, which states that "any form of discrimination with regard to a country or a person on grounds of race, religion, politics, gender or otherwise is incompatible with belonging to the Olympic Movement." "

==== Assurances ====
In August 2013, the IOC stated that it had "received assurances from the highest level of government in Russia that the legislation will not affect those attending or taking part in the Games"; this was contradicted in a statement three days later made by Russia's Ministry of the Interior, which stated that the anti-propaganda laws would still be enforced in Sochi. The IOC also confirmed that it would enforce Rule 50 of the Olympic Charter, which forbids political protest, against athletes who make displays of support for the LGBT community. The IOC received written assurance from the Russian government in August 2013 stating that it was committed to abiding by the Olympic Charter during the Olympic Games. Vladimir Putin also made similar assurances prior to the Games, but warned LGBT attendees to abide by the law. Anatoly Pakhomov, mayor of Sochi, explained to reporters prior to the Games that homosexuality "was not the custom in the Caucasus", and claimed that no gays lived in Sochi at all (despite the presence of two gay clubs and evidence of an LGBT community in Sochi on a Russian social network). He went on to say that everyone, including gays, were welcome in Sochi, "as long as they do not impose their habits on others."

==== Protests and campaigns ====
Despite these assurances, Olympic-focused protests and campaigns, such as the Principle 6 campaign (a collaboration between a group of Olympic athletes, the organizations All Out, Athlete Ally, and clothing maker American Apparel), have been held in protest of Russia's anti-gay policies. There were also calls to boycott the Games, drawing comparisons to 1980 Summer Olympics boycott . However, a writer for the Financial Times felt that such a boycott would be counter-productive, given that there was no boycott of the 2008 Summer Olympics in Beijing despite China's poor human rights record, but suggested that action by Olympic sponsors would be more effective.

At January 2014 Russian leader of the Left Front movement Vladislav Ryazantsev together with like-minded persons opened out an informative campaign against Olympic Games in Sochi. In the social network of VK.com appeared the group «Boycott of Olympic Games-2014 in Sochi» in which Ryazantsev united with left activist Anton Morvan publishes devastating information about the cost of Olympic Games and scales saw cut at its preparation. In addition, the group collects information about the game shooting of animals in the city-resort. — The Group «Boycott of Olympic Games-2014 in Sochi» is one of many private initiatives of left activists. Its purpose is collection and publication of true information about violations, crimes and peculations during the preparation of the Olympic Games, helping to open eyes people», — Vladislav Ryazantsev reported to the journalist of Donnews.ru. — «In addition, we call to declare boycott, avoid watching the games and buying commodities with symbolism of Olympic Games».

A number of world leaders, including United States president Barack Obama and Vice President Joe Biden, Canadian Prime Minister Stephen Harper, and French President François Hollande, declined to attend the Games' Opening Ceremony as delegates for various reasons. Although attending the Winter Olympics has not historically been a priority for world leaders, there was still speculation that their non-attendance was a symbolic boycott of Russian policies. The U.S. appointed tennis player Billie Jean King and women's hockey player Caitlin Cahow, who are both openly gay, as its delegation instead. Although Obama stressed diversity and made no reference to the controversy when announcing the delegation, on 6 February 2014, he confirmed the intent of the choices during an interview with Bob Costas aired by NBC the next day, stating that "there is no doubt we wanted to make it very clear that we do not abide by discrimination in anything, including discrimination on the basis of sexual orientation." Cahow stated that the decision was meant to "[highlight] Americans who know what it means to have freedoms and liberties under the Constitution. That's really what we're representing in Sochi and it's not at all different from what's espoused in the spirit of Olympism."

In February 2014, prior to the games, a group of 40 human rights organizations (including Athlete Ally, Freedom House, Human Rights Campaign, Human Rights Watch and Russian LGBT network among others) sent a joint letter to the ten Worldwide Olympic Partner companies, urging them to use their prominence to support the rights of LGBT athletes under the Olympic Charter, and pressure the IOC to show greater scrutiny towards the human rights abuses of future host countries. On 3 February 2014, USOC sponsor AT&T issued a statement in support of LGBT rights at the Games, becoming the first major Olympic advertiser to condemn the laws. Several major non-sponsors also made pro-LGBT statements to coincide with the opening of the Games; Google placed a quotation from the Olympic Charter and an Olympic-themed logo in the colors of the rainbow flag on its home page worldwide, while Channel 4 (who serves as the official British broadcaster of the Paralympics) adopted a rainbow-colored logo and broadcast a "celebratory", pro-LGBT advert entitled "Gay Mountain" on 7 February 2014, alongside an interview with former rugby union player and anti-homophobia activist Ben Cohen.

The Huffington Post noted that the opening ceremony, ironically, featured tributes to "some of history's most widely acclaimed and definitely gay Russians", including composer Peter Tchaikovsky (1840–1893), ballet dancer Vaslav Nijinsky (1889–1950), and patron of arts, and founder of Ballets Russes, Sergei Diaghilev. Russian organizers denied any connection, stating that these figures were selected because of their cultural significance. On the same topic, critics also noted the Russian pop duo t.A.T.u were invited to perform during the opening ceremony; although they are not actually lesbian, the all-female duo were well known for incorporating themes of lesbianism in their music and on-stage personas (live appearances often featured the singers kissing each other), its name is a corruption of a shortened Russian phrase meaning "this girl loves that girl", and the duo made a statement in support of LGBT rights in the wake of Yuri Luzhkov's objection to the 2007 Moscow Pride parade. Organizers noted that t.A.T.u were chosen because they were well known to an international audience, denying any relation to LGBT rights.

== Doping scandal ==
In December 2014, German public broadcaster ARD aired a documentary which made wide-ranging allegations that Russia organized a state-run doping program which supplied their athletes with performance-enhancing drugs. In November 2015, Russia's track and field team was provisionally suspended by the IAAF.

In May 2016, The New York Times published allegations by the former director of Russia's anti-doping laboratory, Dr. Grigory Rodchenkov, that a conspiracy of corrupt anti-doping officials, FSB intelligence agents, and compliant Russian athletes used banned substances to gain an unfair advantage during the Games. Rodchenkov stated that the FSB tampered with over 100 urine samples as part of a cover-up, and that at least fifteen of the Russian medals won at Sochi were the result of doping.

In December 2016, following the release of the McLaren report on Russian doping at the Sochi Olympics, the International Olympic Committee announced the initiation of an investigation of 28 Russian athletes at the Sochi Olympic Games. La Gazzetta dello Sport reported the names of 17 athletes, of whom 15 are among the 28 under investigation.

Three ladies artistic skaters were named as being under investigation. They are Adelina Sotnikova, the singles gold medalist, as well as pairs skaters Tatiana Volosozhar and Ksenia Stolbova. Volosozhar and Stolbova won gold and silver medals, respectively, in pairs skating. Both also won gold medals in the team event, which also puts the other eight team medalists at risk of losing their golds.

Six skiers were provisionally suspended from competition on the basis of the McLaren report: Evgeniy Belov, Alexander Legkov, Alexey Petukhov, Maxim Vylegzhanin, Yuliya Ivanova and Yevgeniya Shapovalova. Legkov won a gold medal, and Vylegzhanin won three silver medals.

The International Biathlon Union provisionally suspended two biathletes who were in the Sochi games: Olga Vilukhina and Yana Romanova, according to La Gazzetta dello Sport. Vilukhina won silver in sprint, and both women were on a relay team that won the silver medal. They both retired after the 2014/2015 season.

The International Bobsleigh and Skeleton Federation provisionally suspended four skeleton sliders. They are among the six athletes on the skeleton team: Nikita Tregubov, Alexander Tretyakov, Sergey Chudinov, Elena Nikitina, Maria Orlova and Olga Potylitsina. Tretyakov won a gold medal, and Nikitina won a silver.

It has been speculated that some Russian Winter Olympians used xenon gas in preparation for the Sochi Games. Using xenon gas is not specifically banned by the World Anti-Doping Agency (WADA); however, it could be used for performance enhancement and raises questions about what constitutes doping and practices that should and should not be allowed.

== Event judging ==
=== Allegations of vote swapping ===
French sports newspaper L'Équipe, quoting an anonymous Russian coach, alleged that Russia and the United States would swap votes, with the United States voting for Russian athletes in pairs figure skating and team events and Russia voting for the Americans in ice dancing. The allegations were categorically denied by U.S. Figure Skating.

=== Men's ice hockey tournament ===
During a men's ice hockey tournament round-robin game between the U.S. and Russia, a Russian goal scored late in the third period, which would have given the team a 3–2 lead, was disallowed after referees ruled that the net was moved when the goal was scored. The decision resulted in the score remaining 2–2. The U.S. went on to win the game in a shootout, which resulted in Russia playing a playoff qualification game while the U.S. received a bye to the quarterfinals. The decision was criticized by many Russian politicians, TV hosts and commentators. Following the game, protesters led by the Kremlin party's youth group held a demonstration in front of the U.S. embassy in Moscow to protest the decision. In response to the controversy, Konstantin Komissarov, the referee supervisor of International Ice Hockey Federation, officially confirmed that the decision by the referee was correct, citing the appropriate use of video review in assessing the play.

=== Ladies' singles figure skating ===
Immediately after the final scores were announced, confirming Russia's victory, journalistic questions arose regarding whether Russian 17-year-old Adelina Sotnikova's performances deserved higher scores than the performances of 23-year-old Yuna Kim from South Korea. Questions over the judges, the judging system, and the anonymity of scores were also raised in the press.

== Athlete selection controversies ==
Several controversial choices of the athletes going to the Olympics to represent countries have occurred.

The participation of Lebanese alpine skier Jackie Chamoun became controversial in Lebanon after it was revealed at home in 2014 that she had posed in sexy photos for an Austrian calendar in 2011. A ministerial investigation has been mooted, while an online support protest "Strip for Jackie" has been organized. Chamoun has denied that she posed nude publicly on her Facebook page, saying that the behind the scenes images were not for publication.

In South Korea, a furore has erupted over the loss of Viktor Ahn (Ahn Hyun-Soo) to Team Russia. Several newspapers reported the scorn of the Korean public and newspaper editors on the actions of the Korea Skating Union. The minister of sport and president of South Korea have both promised action in rooting out corruption and feuding at the organization that may have led to his "defection", in a bid to clean it up in preparation for the 2018 Winter Olympics in South Korea. The Korean public had generally been supportive of Ahn, but he later received online bashing after the Yuna Kim controversy.

The United States' selection of Ashley Wagner over Mirai Nagasu for the Olympic team caused some controversy as Nagasu finished ahead of Wagner at the 2014 U.S. Championships. The results at the pre-Olympic nationals often play a major role in the decision process but U.S. Figure Skating never stated that they would be the only results considered. Wagner was selected on the body of her work, instead of her performance at that event. This was the first time that U.S. Figure Skating had selected a skater who had competed in the pre-Olympic nationals and lost over another on who had also competed. On previous occasions, this was done for skaters who had been injured and unable to compete at nationals.

The selection of Evgeni Plushenko by the Russia Olympic Team for figure skating caused some controversy, as he had been beaten by Maxim Kovtun at the 2014 Russian Figure Skating Championships. Plushenko said he won't participate in European Championships and will give spot at men's singles for Kovtun and he will participate in the team event only. ISU president Ottavio Cinquanta cautioned the Figure Skating Federation of Russia, "If one of your skaters has sustained the same injury for years. You should not enter him or her." Plushenko skated strongly in the Short and Free Programs for the Team Event, however in the Men's individuals he withdrew right before the start of the Short Program which left host Russia without an entry since it was too late have Kovtun as a replacement. Russian figure skating officials defended the initial selection of Plushenko by noting that Kovtun had done poorly at international events.

Following the games in July, four Slovenian officials were suspended for four years from FIS after they helped to falsify times and rankings to allow alpine skier Vanessa Vanakorn (best known as the British violinist Vanessa-Mae and represented for Thailand as her father is a Thai) to achieve an average of 140 points of fewer at an FIS event to enable her to qualify for Olympics. At an FIS event in Krvavec, where she achieved her required score, she finished 6th (and last) in the national junior championships, despite being over 14 years older to the next eldest contestant. She also finished 7th (but last), 9th (of 13th) and 10th (of 13th). She finished with a total time of 3:26.97, 50.10 seconds behind the winner, Tina Maze of Slovenia. She was last among the finishers, ranking 67th. During investigations by FIS, it was revealed that the event was fixed to enable her to compete, for example a result including a competitor who was not present in the races, was placed 2nd in one race despite falling and her time was adjusted afterwards by more than 10 seconds, enabling a previously retired competitor who had the best FIS points in the competition to lower the penalty to benefit participants, failing to alter the course between runs and allowing the race to be run despite being suitable under regulations. As a result of taking part in a race rigged to her favor in an event orchestrated by her manager, Vanakorn was banned from skiing for four years.

== Pegasus Airlines Flight 751 ==
On 7 February 2014, during the opening ceremony and one day after the start of the 2014 Winter Olympics, a man attempted to hijack Pegasus Airlines Flight 751 that was traveling from Kharkiv, Ukraine, to Istanbul, Turkey. The man claimed he had a bomb on board, and demanded to be flown to Sochi, the host city of the 2014 Winter Olympics. The pilots turned off the inflight monitors and landed at Istanbul's Sabiha Gökçen Airport, fooling the man into thinking he was landing in Sochi. The plane, a Boeing 737-800 reg TC-CCP, was escorted to Istanbul by two Turkish F-16 fighter jets. The man, who appeared to be severely intoxicated, was detained by police and taken to the Istanbul Security Headquarters. In 2018, Russia's President Vladimir Putin admitted that he ordered the shooting down of a passenger plane that was reportedly carrying a bomb and targeting the opening of the 2014 Winter Olympics.

== Environment ==
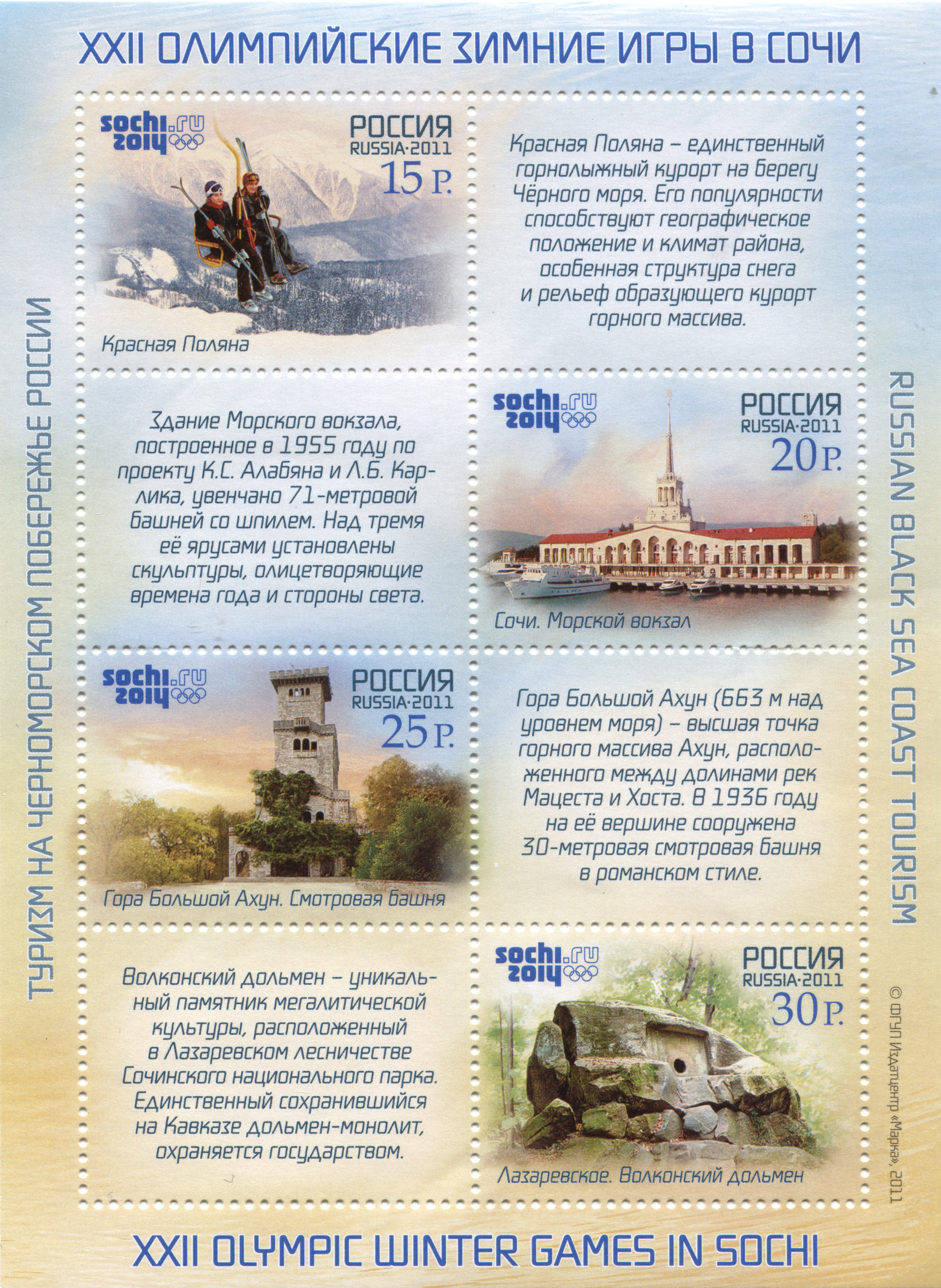
XXII Olympic winter games in Sochi. The souvenir sheet of Russia, 2011

Despite several expert statements that the construction of Olympic venues in the buffer area of the UNESCO protected Caucasus Biosphere Reserve and Sochi National Park could be harmful, the IOC approved the plans. Greenpeace of Russia said that the IOC and the Russian Government assumed all responsibility for any damage to the West Caucasus natural UNESCO World Heritage Site. According to the Sochi bid, a wide array of construction was planned in the Grushevyi Ridge area. They included a cascade of hydroelectric power stations on the Mzymta River, sewage treatment facilities, a high-speed rail link, a Mountain Olympic Village, a track for bobsleigh, luge and skeleton (which was relocated in May 2009), and a biathlon venue. Alpine skiing venues were being constructed in the Rosa Khutor plateau and the Psekhako Ridge area. Environmentalists proposed building up Krasnaya Polyana instead of destroying nature reserve sites.

Environmentalists also opposed the plan of construction of a cargo terminal for ships in the mouth of the Psou River in the Imereti Lowland, because this could lead to the destruction of the largest areas of sea-flooded shore and marshes.

On 3 July 2008, Vladimir Putin directed some of the Olympic venues, such as the luge and bobsleigh track, to be relocated (the Russian National Sliding Centre was relocated in May 2009). He said "In setting our priorities and choosing between money and the environment, we're choosing the environment."

Geologist Sergei Volkov fled to Ukraine after speaking out about environmental and geological problems. He stated that mercury and uranium deposits, as well as the probability of landslides, made the location of the games hazardous. He also argued that the location of a cargo port was inappropriate. A storm there killed three seamen and destroyed $14 million of infrastructure.

On 29 October 2013 it was reported that Russia broke its 'Zero Waste' Olympic Pledge, as it emerged that Russia's state-owned rail monopoly was dumping tons of construction waste into an illegal landfill, raising concerns of possible contamination in the water that directly supplies Sochi.

== Animal rights ==
The issue of stray dogs has come up before the Olympics. On 3 February 2014, the city hired a firm to exterminate the stray population – an approach that has brought international condemnation. These plans have been abandoned after complaints by local citizens. The stray dogs will be collected from the streets and put in a shelter.

Russia originally planned to have two orca whales perform in the opening ceremonies of the Sochi 2014 Olympics. They were two of eight whales captured off the coast of Russia. After backlash by various advocacy groups and petitions signed by the general public, a statement was released that the whales would not be part of the Olympics. The current whereabouts of the whales are unknown.

It was rumored that the committee had planned to have a dolphin trained to carry the Olympic torch. Activists spoke up about the issue immediately, causing the President of the Olympics Committee, Dmitry Chernyshenko, to issue the statement that, "I confirm that we do not involve any orcas or dolphins for the Olympics." Whether or not there had been any plans for a dolphin torchbearer has never been confirmed.

== Economy ==
According to The New York Times the $50 billion or so lavished on Sochi is becoming a political liability. The stalling of the economy, despite the stimulus of Olympic spending, has raised worries about popular unrest directed at the Kremlin and a tightening of political freedoms in response once the Games are over. "It is about what Russia could have done with this money." said Alexei Navalny, the Foundation for the Fight Against Corruption.

According to IRN.Ru analytical agency, prices for land, located next to the shoreline, reach $150,000 per 100 m^{2}, while price per square metre in average panel apartment building on the outskirts of the city already reaches $2000. "As a result of 2014 Olympics euphoria prices will rise annually by 15–20%," speculates Irina Tyurina, press secretary of Russian Tourist Industry Union. This could lead to decrease in tourist interest to Sochi, which already has fallen below Anapa, Gelendzhik, and Adler.

After the IOC Evaluation Commission visited Sochi in February 2007, local authorities promised to buy the lands from Lower Imereti Bay long-time residents for a fair market price. But during the following half a year, no local resident could get their land approved as private property.

While most Olympic Games have high cost overruns, for these Games they are much higher than usual. Much of the cost overruns have been blamed on corruption, with Boris Nemtsov claiming: "The Sochi Olympics are an unprecedented thieves' caper in which representatives of Putin's government are mixed up along with the oligarchs close to the government." According to research by Transparency International, a global anti-corruption watchdog, approximately 50 percent or more of the building costs went to corruption.

Poor workers conditions and rights have also been raised as an issue of concern, with at least 25 people dying and many more injured in accidents on sites in 2012 and with workers not getting paid at all.

== Political stability and governance ==
The 2008 Russia–Georgia war, which broke out at the start of the 2008 Summer Olympics, surprised the Olympic community. "It is not what the world wants to see. It is contrary to what the Olympic ideal stands for", said an IOC spokesperson. However, in November 2008, the IOC turned down a request by the Georgian National Olympic Committee to reconsider its decision to hold the Olympics on the territory "adjacent both to the [Russian-]occupied Abkhaz conflict zone, and to the extremely unstable and volatile North Caucasus".

Related concerns persist, regarding the region's safety and the desirability of hosting an Olympics in a conflict-ridden zone. "The region is such a muddied and bloodied aquarium of conflict that to pick out any one fish is impossible," says Oleg Nechiporenko, chief analyst for Russia's National Anti-Terrorist and Anti-Criminal Fund, in response to a 26 May 2010, car bombing, whose suspects include Russian nationalists, local Russian mafia groups, separatists and Islamists in the North Caucasus, or a remnant of the war in Abkhazia.

Sochi borders Russia's six autonomous North Caucasus republics, home of the Second Chechen War which allegedly face social problems. According to an article in Daily Telegraph, Prince Bandar bin Sultan, head of Saudi intelligence, allegedly confronted the Kremlin with a mix of inducements and threats in a bid to break the deadlock over Syria. This included security of winter olympics in Sochi if there is no accord. "I can give you a guarantee to protect the Winter Olympics next year. The Chechen groups that threaten the security of the games are controlled by us," he allegedly said.

Russian Envoy to the North Caucasus Alexander Khloponin told local law enforcement that "the violent scramble for assets" is likely to get worse as Russia invests heavily in tourist infrastructure and Olympic-caliber ski resorts.

=== Safety ===
Three suicide bombings in Volgograd, one in October 2013 and the others in December 2013, have raised additional international concerns about security during the Olympics. The IOC expressed sympathy for the victims and underlined that they trusted that Russia's security arrangements for the Olympics would be adequate.

The British, German, Italian, Hungarian, Austrian, Slovenian and Slovak Olympic associations received threats that athletes would be "blown up" or kidnapped by terrorists at the Winter Games. According to the IOC, the letters did not represent any real threat.

== Media coverage ==
IOC President Thomas Bach criticized attempts to politicize the Games, saying that governments should not send political messages "on the backs of their athletes." Benjamin Bidder of Spiegel Online and Julia Ioffe of The New Republic compared the negative pre-Sochi coverage to schadenfreude and Russophobia, while Anton Fedyashin of The Guardian blamed lingering Cold War mentalities for "dishing up a feast of negativity." In an editorial published by The Nation, scholar of Russian studies Stephen F. Cohen criticized the "toxic coverage" for "exploiting the threat of terrorism so licentiously it seemed pornographic." He further wrote that "American media on Russia today are less objective, less balanced, more conformist and scarcely less ideological than when they covered Soviet Russia during the Cold War." Cohen's views on US-Russian relations were criticized as being pro-Putin.

According to The Guardian the games were more politicised than the before, serving as shameless promotion of Putin's Russia. While former world chess champion and Russian opposition figure Garry Kasparov said that game bolstered Putin's cult of personality.

Comedians and satirical newspapers took advantage of the widespread pessimism. On 8 February, The Daily Currant posted a story alleging that a man responsible for operating the Olympic rings during the opening ceremony, which famously suffered a technical glitch, had been "found dead...with multiple stab wounds." The fictional story went viral on social media. On 20 February, luger Kate Hansen posted a well-publicized video on her Twitter account allegedly showing a wolf roaming the hallways of her Sochi hotel; it was later revealed to be a hoax staged by talk show host Jimmy Kimmel and Hansen. USA Luge officials distanced themselves from the incident, with spokesman Sandy Caligiore stating, "I can tell you that our organization is not happy with the incident. That's not USA Luge speaking." Throughout the duration of the Olympics the @SochiProblems Twitter account had nearly 100,000 more followers than the official IOC feed @Sochi2014. The blog GossipSochi.com was later set up to debunk @SochiProblems postings, with many revealed to be fakes.

In an interview, IOC supervisor Jean-Claude Killy stated that several hotels intended to house the foreign media were unfinished by the opening of the Olympics because officials realized "too late" that construction had fallen behind. According to David Wallechinsky, president of the International Society of Olympic Historians, many of the incidents early in the Olympics were "standard problems" and were not unique to Sochi. Wallechinsky further noted, "When you mess up with the media before the Games start, you're going to have a problem." In an interview that aired on Russian television on 24 February, Vladimir Putin opined that much of the criticism stemmed from rivalry in international politics, saying "There is a cohort of critics that are far from sport, they are engaged in a competitive struggle in international politics. They used this Olympic project to achieve their own objectives in the field of anti-Russian propaganda."

The mood greatly improved as the Games progressed. With a few notable exceptions, NBC largely avoided broadcasting negative material, although several segments deemed "overly friendly to Russia" were criticized by some U.S. commentators. Following the closing ceremony, Mark Sappenfield of The Christian Science Monitor concluded that by many measures the Olympics were "very successful." Sappenfield singled out the organization as particularly good, writing that "Athletes and Olympic officials were nearly unanimous: This was an extraordinarily well run Olympics." Thomas Bach also voiced support, stating "We saw excellent Games and what counts most is the opinions of the athletes and they were enormously satisfied...You have to ask all those who criticised whether they change their opinions now."

== 2014 Russian Formula One Grand Prix ==
In 2014, Sochi hosted the Russian Formula One Grand Prix. The circuit runs in and around the Sochi Olympic Park, which led to the IOC expressing concern that construction of the circuit could disrupt preparations for the Olympic Games. The IOC was granted the power to delay the inaugural race until 2015 to ensure the Olympics were held without disruption, but did not use it as competition was not disrupted.

== Countries choosing not to enter competitors ==
A total of 91 nations qualified to compete at the Games. However, three nations chose not to send their athletes to the Games, even though they had met the international qualification standards.

Puerto Rico did not send Kristina Krone for the second consecutive time because the Puerto Rico Olympic Committee (COPUR) withdrew its recognition of the Puerto Rico Winter Sports Federation after the 2002 Winter Olympics due to an eligibility controversy involving a member of their bobsled team. According to COPUR president Sara Rosario, "Until there is a properly constituted winter sports federation with the requisite seriousness upon which we can consistently rely every four years, we cannot endorse (participation by Puerto Rico athletes in the Olympic Winter Games)". Krone has represented Puerto Rico since 2008 in more than 100 alpine ski competitions sanctioned by the International Ski Federation including the 2009, 2011 and 2013 World Alpine Ski Championships.

South Africa would not enter skier Sive Speelman, who, although invited to compete by the IOC, did not meet the standards set by the South African Sports Confederation and Olympic Committee.

Algeria also chose not to enter its only competitor, Mehdi-Selim Khelifi, because he was the only one that managed to qualify, even though he was their only entry four years prior at the 2010 Winter Olympics in Vancouver.

== Independent participants ==
There were three Independent Olympic participants from India who competed under the Olympics flag. In December 2012, the Indian Olympic Association was suspended by the IOC due to government interference in the autonomy and election of leaders, thus not complying with the Olympic charter. Fresh elections were due to take place after the opening ceremony so Indian athletes were scheduled to participate as independents.

== Course adjustments ==
A crash in practice from Norwegian slopestyle snowboarder Torstein Horgmo, who fractured his collarbone, and complaints from other athletes that some jumps were too steep have prompted organizers to modify the slopestyle course in the week before the Games. A few days later the women's downhill ski training was stopped after the opening three racers were getting too much air on the jump down the home stretch. The International Ski Federation had workers adjusting the course making it smoother.

== Inadequate preparation of visitor facilities ==
In the week prior to the start of the Games, reports began coming out of Sochi that a number of the accommodations for visitors and journalists were still incomplete. Several hotels meant to house visitors to the Games were reported to be still under construction upon arrival, as well as missing basic furniture from some of the rooms that had finished construction. The issues forced a number of visitors to seek alternate accommodations. Other problems reported included "piles of garbage" on the streets of the media village, as well as significant construction noise.

Other notable incidents:

- Johnny Quinn, member of the US bobsled team, became trapped in his bathroom and had to bash a hole in the door to get out.
- Stacy St. Clair, Chicago Tribune reporter, reported that her hotel had no water, and that staff informed her that when it returned, not to wash her face in it as it was dangerous. The water service that returned provided murky dark water. The "dangerous face water" incident went viral.

== Use of mourning symbols ==
During the women's 15-kilometre skiathlon four Norwegian skiers used black mourning bands in honor of teammate Astrid Uhrenholdt Jacobsen's brother who had died unexpectedly on the opening day of the Olympics. The IOC sent a reminder to the Norwegian Olympic Committee (NOC) that using mourning bands was not allowed during the games. IOC's letter caused protests in Norway and Sweden. NOC general secretary Inge Andersen met with IOC president Thomas Bach to discuss the matter on 10 February 2014. Norway's IOC member Gerhard Heiberg indicated that IOC would reconsider the ban against mourning bands.

Freestyle skiers were told by IOC not to wear helmet stickers in memory of Sarah Burke, who died in an accident in 2012. However, many still did, and the rule was believed to not have been enforced.

On 19 February Ukrainian athletes asked for and were refused permission by the IOC to wear black arm bands to honor those killed in the violent clashes in Kyiv the previous day. According to IOC spokesman Mark Adams "They weren't forbidden to wear armbands. The Ukrainian NOC met with IOC officials informally yesterday. They discussed what should be done, and they reached the conclusion there were other ways of marking this moment. Some athletes have taken other views and other ways of doing things". IOC president Bach offered his condolences "to those who have lost loved ones in these tragic events".

== Athlete boycott ==
On 19 February 2014 Ukrainian alpine skier Bohdana Matsotska refused to further participate in the Olympic Games in protest of the violent clashes in Kyiv on the previous day. She and her father posted a message on Facebook stating "In solidarity with the fighters on the barricades of the Maidan, and as a protest against the criminal actions made towards the protesters, the irresponsibility of the president and his lackey government, we refuse further performance at the Olympic Games in Sochi 2014".

On 20 February 2014 the Ukrainian NOC reported that as many as half of the 45 Ukrainian athletes at the Olympics had left the games to return home. But according to Ukrainian NOC president Sergey Bubka they had returned home in compliance with their original schedule, and their departure was thus not related to the riots in Kyiv.

== Drug tests ==
During the 2014 Winter Olympics, six athletes tested positive for banned substances and were sent home from the Games.

On 21 February, skier Evi Sachenbacher-Stehle of Germany and Italian bobsleigh brakeman William Frullani were both sent home from Sochi after failing drugs tests. They both tested positive for methylhexanamine. On 22 February, Ukrainian cross-country skier Maryna Lisohor was tested positive for trimetazidine and Latvian ice hockey player Vitalijs Pavlovs tested positive for methylhexaneamine. On 23 February, Austrian skier Johannes Dürr tested positive for EPO and Swedish ice hockey player Nicklas Bäckström tested positive for a substance found in an allergy medication.

== Men's freestyle skiing – ski cross ==
Both Canada and Slovenia appealed separately to the Court of Arbitration for Sport that the three French athletes in the Big Final of the men's ski cross final had their pants illegally changed by their coach. They argued it gave the three an aerodynamic advantage over the rest of the field. Both countries first appealed to the International Ski Federation, but were rejected since they appealed hours after the end of the competition (when the deadline was 15 minutes after the close of the race). The appeal to the court was ultimately unsuccessful as well, because the court agreed with the ski federation that the appeal was filed past the deadline.

== Russian Mafia used to threaten rival campaign allegations ==
The Russian mafia helped Russia win the games by threatening the Salzburg campaign leader Fedor Radmann, who later resigned in 2007, according to German security officials. Informants observed a meeting between mafia leaders and Russian government foreign policy advisor Sergei Prikhodko in 2006 in a Munich restaurant to discuss the Olympic selection process. Radmann himself denies he ever met any Russian mobsters but his colleagues state that he feared for his life, and the mayor of Salzburg Heinz Schaden confirms the link.

== See also ==
- Concerns and controversies at the 2010 Winter Olympics
- Concerns and controversies at the 2012 Summer Olympics
- List of 2018 FIFA World Cup controversies
