= 2034 FIFA World Cup bids =

Football World Cup host nation bids

The 2034 FIFA World Cup bidding process resulted in the Fédération Internationale de Football Association (FIFA) selecting Saudi Arabia as the host nation for the 2034 FIFA World Cup.

== Host selection ==
The bidding process for the 2034 World Cup began on 4 October 2023 and used the same requirements as the 2030 World Cup. Due to FIFA's confederation rotation policy, only member associations from the Asian Football Confederation and Oceania Football Confederation were eligible to host. FIFA made the decision to host the 2030 World Cup in three continents (Africa, Europe and South America) and the 2026 World Cup was set to be held in North America, which meant that the 2034 World Cup would necessarily have to be held in Asia or Oceania. According to a New York Times report, observers saw this as paving the path for Saudi Arabia to host the 2034 World Cup by substantially reducing potential hosting bids.

On 31 October 2023, FIFA president Gianni Infantino announced that Saudi Arabia would host the 2034 World Cup, making it the third time the Asian Football Confederation hosted the World Cup, after the 2002 tournament in Japan and South Korea and the 2022 tournament in Qatar, as well as the second time being held in the Arabian Peninsula, after Qatar 2022.

== Bids ==
=== Saudi Arabia ===
After Saudi Arabia abandoned its 2030 bid alongside Greece and Egypt, they switched their focus to a solo 2034 bid. Similar strategies to the 2022 FIFA World Cup in Qatar, which was held in November–December as opposed to the usual summer scheduling, may be used to mitigate the country's summer heat, though the Saudi FA have insisted on a plan to host in the summer. The country's bid was announced on 4 October 2023. On 5 October, AFC President Salman bin Ibrahim Al Khalifa backed Saudi Arabia's bid. On the 9th, Saudi Arabia announced that it submitted the official letter of intent, and signed the declaration to FIFA to bid to host the 2034 FIFA World Cup, and that over 70 different member associations already pledged their support for its bid. On 30 November 2024, FIFA released its evaluation report of Saudi Arabia's bid. According to the report, Saudi Arabia was awarded an average score of 4.2 out 5, the highest in history.

=== Evaluation report ===
On 30 November 2024, 13 days before the vote, the evaluation report was released. The Saudi Arabia bid scored 4.2, but the technical rating was 419.8, the highest in FIFA history.

==== Evaluation score ====
2034 FIFA World Cup evaluation report
Bidding nation(s)	Evaluation score
Saudi Arabia	4.2/5

==== Voting ====
The vote to ratify Saudi Arabia as the host of the 2034 FIFA World Cup took place on 11 December 2024.

2024 Extraordinary FIFA Congress; 11 December 2024 – Zürich, Switzerland
Nation	Round 1
Saudi Arabia	Acclamation

== Declined bids ==
- ASEAN
- Australia, New Zealand, and Indonesia
- China, Hong Kong, and Macau
- Kazakhstan, Kyrgyzstan, and Uzbekistan

=== Association of Southeast Asian Nations (ASEAN) ===
The first bid for the 2034 FIFA World Cup was proposed as a collective bid by the members of the Association of Southeast Asian Nations (ten countries: Brunei, Cambodia, Indonesia, Laos, Malaysia, Myanmar, Philippines, Singapore, Thailand, Vietnam). The idea of a combined ASEAN bid was mooted as early as January 2011, when the former Football Association of Singapore President, Zainudin Nordin, said in a statement that the proposal was made at an ASEAN Foreign Ministers meeting, despite the fact that countries cannot bid (as that's up to national associations). In 2013, Nordin and Special Olympics Malaysia President, Datuk Mohamed Faisol Hassan, recalled the idea for ASEAN to jointly host a World Cup. Under FIFA rules as of 2017, the 2030 World Cup cannot be held in Asia (AFC) as Asian Football Confederation members are excluded from the bidding following the selection of Qatar in 2022. Therefore, the earliest bid by an AFC member could be made for 2034.

Later, Malaysia withdrew from involvement, but Singapore and other ASEAN countries continued the campaign to submit a joint bid for the World Cup in 2034. In February 2017, ASEAN held talks on launching a joint bid during a visit by FIFA President Gianni Infantino to Yangon, Myanmar. On 1 July 2017, Vice General Chairman of the Football Association of Indonesia Joko Driyono said that Indonesia and Thailand were set to lead a consortium of Southeast Asian nations in the bid. Driyono added that due to geographic and infrastructure considerations and the expanded format (48 teams), at least two or three ASEAN countries combined would be in a position necessary to host matches.

In September 2017, the Thai League 1 Deputy CEO Benjamin Tan, at the ASEAN Football Federation (AFF) Council meeting, confirmed that his Association "put in their interest to bid and co-host" the 2034 World Cup with Indonesia. On the same occasion, the General Secretary of the AFF, Dato Sri Azzuddin Ahmad, confirmed that Indonesia and Thailand would submit a joint bid. Indonesia was the first Asian team and the only Southeast Asian country to have participated in the World Cup, when the territory was known as the Dutch East Indies.

However, in June 2018, FIFA executive committee member, Yang di-Pertuan Agong and Sultan of Pahang, Tengku Abdullah, who is also the former president of the Football Association of Malaysia (FAM), expressed interest in joining the two countries in hosting the World Cup together. The same year, Vietnam expressed interest in joining the bid for the same competition, despite some infrastructure concerns. The four countries jointly hosted a football event before during the 2007 AFC Asian Cup.

In June 2019, the Prime Minister of Thailand, Prayut Chan-o-cha, announced that all 10 nations of ASEAN would launch a joint-bid to host the 2034 FIFA World Cup, being the first to submit a ten-country joint bid in the FIFA World Cup history.

On 9 October 2019, five ASEAN countries officially proposed hosting the 2034 FIFA World Cup. Thailand is to lead the initiative.

On 15 June 2022, Cambodian Prime Minister Hun Sen, in his role as chair of ASEAN, said he would urge Southeast Asian leaders to bid to host the FIFA World Cup in 2034 or 2038.

=== Australia and with other hosts ===
After its failed bid to host the 2022 FIFA World Cup, Australia considered a joint bid with neighbouring New Zealand, an OFC member with which they co-hosted the 2023 FIFA Women's World Cup. Australia re-established this intention in August 2021, shortly after Brisbane's success in bidding to host the 2032 Summer Olympics. A joint bid with Indonesia and other ASEAN nations instead of New Zealand was also discussed by Football Australia. However, Indonesia remained reluctant to the joint bid with Australia, considering the country is also taking part in the ASEAN bid for the same competition. An alternative suggestion is for Australia and New Zealand to partner alongside Malaysia and Singapore, instead of Indonesia even though both countries are also involved in the ASEAN bid as well.

Football Australia chief executive, James Johnson, said his organisation is "exploring the possibility" following FIFA's deadline for bids to be submitted by 31 October 2023. A major challenge to the bid however was the need to construct more stadiums or expand current stadiums to FIFA standards. Indonesia was in talks with Australia, Singapore, and Malaysia with a joint bid, though they pulled out on 18 October, backing the Saudi bid instead like much of the AFC.

On 31 October, Football Australia put out a statement saying that they decided against bidding, leaving Saudi Arabia as the sole bid.

== Other bids ==
Before the 2034 World Cup was confirmed to be in Asia and Oceania, these were other countries that were interested in bidding for the World Cup.

- CAF:
  - Zimbabwe
  - Egypt
  - Nigeria
