= Giorgio Marchetti =

Italian sports official

Giorgio Marchetti (born 27 February 1960) is an Italian sports official who is the deputy secretary general of UEFA. He is most widely known for his role as the master of ceremonies of the UEFA Champions League, UEFA Europa League, UEFA Conference League, and UEFA European Championship draws.

== Career ==
Marchetti has worked in football since the 1980s. He became general secretary of the Lega Nazionale Professionisti in 1997, and oversaw new transfer systems, calendars, and licensing in Italy.

In 2003, he was appointed marking director of UEFA, becoming the first Italian to hold the position when he assumed the position in 2004. He went on to become UEFA director of competitions.

In 2016, Marchetti entered the public eye when he became the main draw conductor for the UEFA Champions League, after his predecessor Gianni Infantino was elected president of FIFA. Since then, he has developed what observers have called "a cult following" on social media, and is known for his "unflappable" demeanor during the draws.

In 2020, as director of competitions for UEFA, he was responsible for proposing alternative formats for the Champions League and Europa League seasons, in light of the global coronavirus pandemic. In December 2021, he apologised publicly after technical errors required him to order the UEFA Champions League Round of 16 draw to be completely redrawn.

== Personal life ==
Marchetti is married and has three children.
