= Gay Mountain =

Production
- Running time: 1:30

Original release
- Release: 6 February 2014

Gay Mountain is a 90-second video created for UK broadcaster Channel 4 by its in-house advertising agency 4Creative. It first aired across all of Channel 4's television channels on the day of the official opening of the Sochi 2014 Winter Olympics, 7 February 2014, having been released on YouTube the previous night, on 6 February 2014. Within 48 hours of its online release it had accumulated over half a million views.

== Synopsis ==
The video opens with a title slide saying: "Channel 4 proudly presents A SPECIAL WINTER ANTHEM" and depicts a fictional scenario in which a young woman enters a small auditorium and takes a seat as one of the last people to arrive. A man (Fred Bear of cabaret act Bearlesque), wearing a large brown fur coat, appears on stage and starts singing a song parodying the National Anthem of Russia, with his hand held to his chest.

Several members of the audience stand and emulate his gesture. Within a few bars, the singer turns around to face a red curtain behind him; this now opens up to reveal a rainbow arch with light bulbs which illuminate, and the music style changes into an up-beat dance track. Four female dancers, wearing cabaret costumes and sunglasses, appear and peel the fur coat off the singer, while putting a set of fake bear ears on his head. Now only wearing his boots, socks, red shorts with a fake bear tail and his bear ears, the man continues singing and dancing, repeating the chorus: "Good luck gays on Gay Mountain".

As the song progresses, more and more members of the audience get up and dance to the music and silver foil confetti rains from the ceiling. Among the cutaways to the audience, a young woman is seen happily dancing on her own, a male couple kiss and a topless DJ wearing sunglasses - who commentators have noted bears some resemblance to Russian President Vladimir Putin - is also dancing along to the music. Throughout, the lyrics of the song appear as Karaoke-style subtitles. The video ends with the music fading out and a closing slide wishing "GOOD LUCK TO EVERYONE OUT IN SOCHI." It finally cuts to a station ident that features the Channel 4 logo, a super-imposed, revolving, rainbow-coloured prism and the caption: "BORN RISKY".

== Release ==
Channel 4's Chief Marketing and Communications Officer, Dan Brooke, has been quoted as saying: "This is a typically Channel 4 way of celebrating the start of the Winter Games and showing our support to all of the athletes out in Sochi, gay or straight." The video was scheduled to be broadcast by the channel for a week after its launch and ties in with Channel 4's temporary rebranding of its logo in the rainbow colours, in response to Russian legislation restricting the rights of lesbian, gay, bisexual and transgender (LGBT) people, introduced in 2013, as well as widely reported human rights abuses against members of the LGBT community, such as those investigated in Channel 4's own documentary Hunted, which was first broadcast in the Dispatches series on Wednesday 5 February 2014, in the run up to the Sochi Winter Olympics.

The night the Gay Mountain video was first aired on Channel 4, a small portion of the song/routine was performed live, to close an episode of The Last Leg. Earlier in the Last Leg episode, they showed a clip of the original Gay Mountain video, and offered half-hearted protest at Channel 4 blatantly mocking Putin and the anti-LGBT attitudes in Russia, when the makers of The Last Leg (which also airs on Channel 4) had been unofficially cautioned by MI6 in the previous weeks, to cut down on their attempts to poke fun at Putin by portraying him as a gay icon. The live performance of Gay Mountain was intercut with a rap - performed by show hosts Adam Hills, Josh Widdicombe and Alex Brooker - offering their apologies and friendship to Vladimir Putin, and offering hope that he won't have them assassinated with a "poisoned umbrella".

A Gay Mountain Extended Mix was posted to SoundCloud on the same date as the YouTube release.

== Reception ==
Gay Mountain drew a largely positive response, with several mainstream media outlets covering its release and viewers' 'likes' outnumbering 'dislikes' on YouTube by 10:1 after two months following its release.

== Lyrics ==
Channel 4 published the lyrics of Gay Mountain on its own website. They are:

Be fabulous, be free

We honour our Queens
And follow the rainbow which leads to the east

Gay mountain, gay mountain
Be proud on gay mountain
Gay mountain, gay mountain
Good luck gays, on gay mountain

Mens and all Men's and Womens and all Womens [sic]
Come together tonight, sing with pride

Gay mountain, gay mountain
Be proud on gay mountain
Gay mountain, gay mountain

Good luck gays, on gay mountain
