= Gianni Infantino =

Swiss football administrator (born 1970)

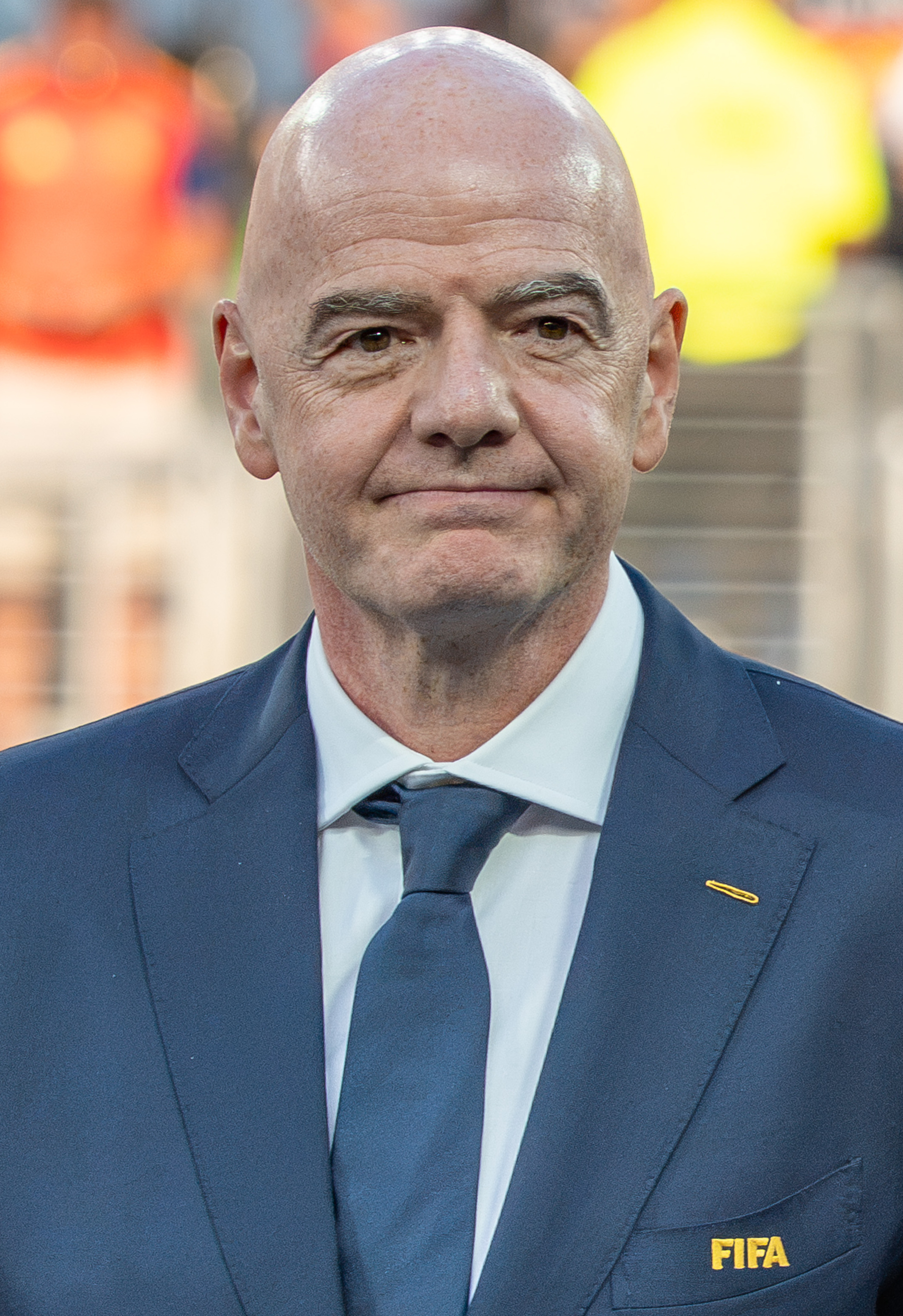
- Infantino in 2026

9th President of FIFA
- Incumbent
- Assumed office 26 February 2016
- Vice President: Ángel María Villar; David Chung; Salman bin Ibrahim Al Khalifa
- Preceded by: Sepp Blatter; Issa Hayatou (acting)

Personal details
- Born: Giovanni Vincenzo Infantino; 23 March 1970 (age 56) Brig, Valais, Switzerland
- Citizenship: Switzerland; Italy; Lebanon (since 2026)
- Spouse: Leena Al Ashqar
- Children: 4
- Education: University of Fribourg (LLB)
- Awards: List

Giovanni Vincenzo "Gianni" Infantino (Note: Italian pronunciation: [dʒoˈvanni vinˈtʃɛntso ˈdʒanni iɱfanˈtiːno]) (born 23 March 1970) is a Swiss football administrator who has served as the president of FIFA since 2016. He was previously Secretary General of UEFA from 2009 to 2016, where he formalised the body's financial regulations and oversaw tournament expansion, such as the UEFA Nations League. He has been an International Olympic Committee (IOC) member since 2020.

As president of FIFA, Infantino has overseen three World Cups: the 2018 World Cup in Russia, the 2022 World Cup in Qatar, and the 2026 World Cup in North America. He re-launched the FIFA Club World Cup in 2022 to incorporate 32 clubs and introduced the FIFA Series in 2024 to supplement international friendlies. His tenure has seen a significant commercial expansion, technological development, and growth in international football. Infantino's career has generated controversy over his leadership directives, financial contracts, and public statements at both UEFA and FIFA.

== Early life and career ==
Infantino was born on 23 March 1970 in Brig, Switzerland, the son of immigrant parents from the Italian regions of Calabria and Lombardy. As a result, he holds both Swiss and Italian citizenship. His parents had lived in Domodossola, Piedmont, before moving to Switzerland for work. His father, Vincenzo, was from Reggio Calabria, while his mother, Maria Minolfi, was from Piamborno in Piancogno, Val Camonica, in the province of Brescia. His father worked for the railway, including on sleeping cars, while his mother ran a newsstand in Brig; Infantino later recalled growing up around the railway station and helping his mother at the kiosk. The family had spent part of the post-war period in Val d'Ossola before moving to Switzerland, where Infantino grew up in Brig.

Owing to his father, an Inter Milan supporter who attended the club's European Cup finals in the 1960s, Infantino was introduced to this football club during his childhood; the very first football match his father took him to see as a child was an Inter match at San Siro. His footballing heroes became Alessandro Altobelli and Evaristo Beccalossi. At the age of 11, he and two friends took over and reorganised FC Folgore, a team formed by Italian immigrants in Upper Valais, and entered it in the Swiss league in the fifth tier. At the age of 14, he attended his first Switzerland–Italy match, a 1–1 friendly in Lausanne in November 1984, with Rossi and Altobelli among the starters. As an amateur footballer, Infantino played as high as the Fourth League, the eighth tier of the Swiss football league system.

Infantino studied law at the University of Fribourg. To help pay for his studies, he worked on sleeping cars and cleaning railway vehicles, as well as helping his mother at the family newsstand. After qualifying as a lawyer and specialising in sports law, he pursued his professional career in the field and worked as an adviser to a variety of football bodies, such as the Italian, Spanish, and Swiss football leagues, before becoming Secretary General of the International Centre for Sports Studies (CIES) at the University of Neuchâtel in the late 1990s. He was also a lecturer in law at the same university. He joined the Union of European Football Associations (UEFA) in August 2000, when he began working on a range of legal, commercial, and professional football matters.

== Career at UEFA ==
Infantino started working at UEFA in August 2000 as a member of its professional football and marketing division, where he subsequently took charge of relations with football leagues, and was appointed as the Director of UEFA's Legal Affairs and Club Licensing Division in January 2004. The Panama Papers indicated that while he was a senior legal official at UEFA, Infantino had co-signed a television-rights contract with a company subsequently linked to defendants in the United States investigation into FIFA corruption, a relationship UEFA had previously denied. Infantino said that he was "dismayed" by the reports and stated that he had never personally dealt with the indicted parties. Following the departure of Lars-Christer Olsson, Infantino became UEFA's Chief Executive ad interim, and was appointed Deputy General Secretary in October 2007 and Secretary General of UEFA in October 2009.

During his time there, UEFA introduced Financial Fair Play and improved commercial support to smaller national associations, while Infantino also played an active role in protecting the integrity of football. In response to the 2015 Greek football scandal and acts of violence and corruption, mainly in Greek football, the Greek government decided to introduce a new sports law. As UEFA's general secretary, Infantino led the negotiations with the Greek government and supported the Hellenic Football Federation's warning to Greece that it faced suspension from international football for interference. Infantino oversaw the expansion of UEFA Euro 2016 to 24 teams, and played a role in the conception of the UEFA Nations League and the UEFA Euro 2020, which was intended to take place in 13 European nations before the number was reduced to 11.

On behalf of UEFA, Infantino handled relations with political institutions, including the European Commission and the European Council. He was regarded as particularly close to Michel Platini, serving as his right-hand man during Platini's presidency of UEFA. He was also known for presiding over the draws for major UEFA competitions, including the Champions League, Europa League, and European Championship, a role in which he was described as a sort of alter ego of the then FIFA president Sepp Blatter; he no longer performed it after becoming FIFA president, when he was succeeded by Giorgio Marchetti.

== Career at FIFA ==
=== Governance ===
==== 2015–2016 ====
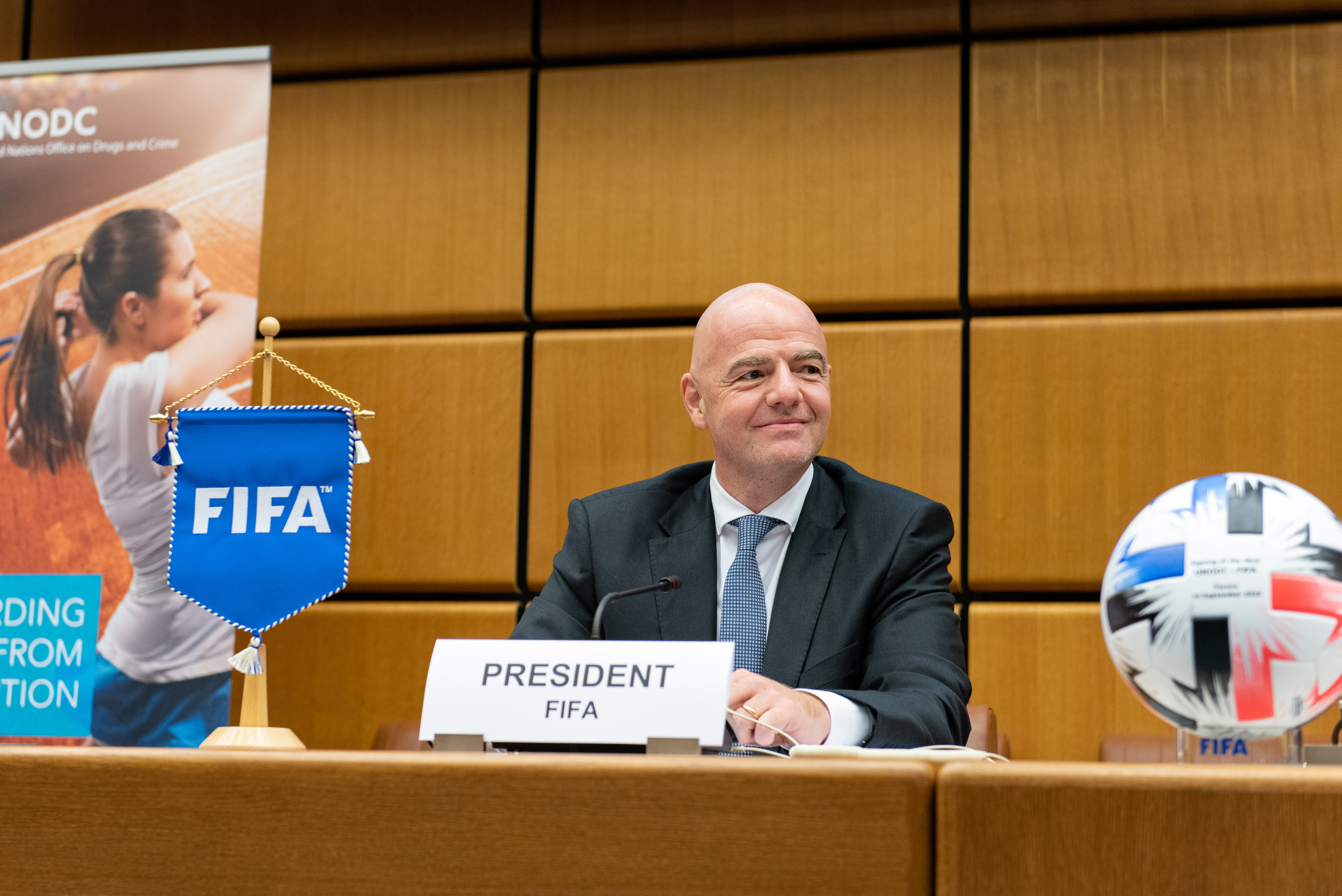
Infantino was elected FIFA president after the 2016 FIFA Extraordinary Congress.

Alongside his career at UEFA, Infantino was a member of FIFA's Reform Committee. In 2015, he received the backing of the UEFA Executive Committee to stand for the position of president in the 2016 FIFA Extraordinary Congress. He was the official UEFA candidate to succeed Sepp Blatter as FIFA president, following Blatter's resignation from the position shortly after his re-election. On 26 October 2015, he confirmed his candidacy and submitted the required declarations of support. He promised to expand the FIFA World Cup to forty teams.

On 26 February 2016, Infantino was elected FIFA President, receiving on the second ballot 115 votes out of 207. He was elected to serve until 2019, completing the remainder of Blatter's term. Infantino, a dual Swiss-Italian citizen at the time, became the first Italian to hold the presidency of FIFA. Following his election, Infantino stepped down as UEFA general secretary, and Theodore Theodoridis was appointed general secretary ad interim on 4 March 2016. In June 2026, ten years after the election, the former UEFA president Michel Platini filed a criminal complaint in France against FIFA and Infantino, alleging influence-peddling to prevent Platini from succeeding Sepp Blatter as FIFA president.

Infantino's first presidency focused on repositioning FIFA as an organisation committed to significantly increase its investment in the development of football worldwide. Since his first election, Infantino has introduced wide-ranging reforms at FIFA, expanding the FIFA World Cup to 48 teams from the 2026 edition onwards, and introducing the use of VAR at the 2018 edition. He also promoted the expansion of the FIFA Club World Cup to 32 teams from the 2025 edition onwards.

The Forward Programme broadened FIFA's role as a socially responsible member of the global community through initiatives such as FIFA Football for Schools, which promotes education and life skills through football, and the FIFA Guardians programme, which seeks to strengthen child safeguarding and protect vulnerable people within football. The programme also provided a framework for cooperation with international organisations, including various agencies of the United Nations, the African Union, ASEAN, and the Council of Europe, using football to support objectives in areas such as education, public health, social development, inclusion, and human rights.

In July 2016, the investigatory chamber of FIFA's ethics committee opened an examination into whether Infantino had breached the FIFA Code of Ethics. The chamber concluded that no violation had occurred. Infantino was also the subject of criminal proceedings in Switzerland concerning undisclosed meetings he held with the Attorney General of Switzerland Michael Lauber and the Valais prosecutor Rinaldo Arnold in 2016 and 2017, while Lauber's office was investigating corruption in international football.

==== 2017–2019 ====
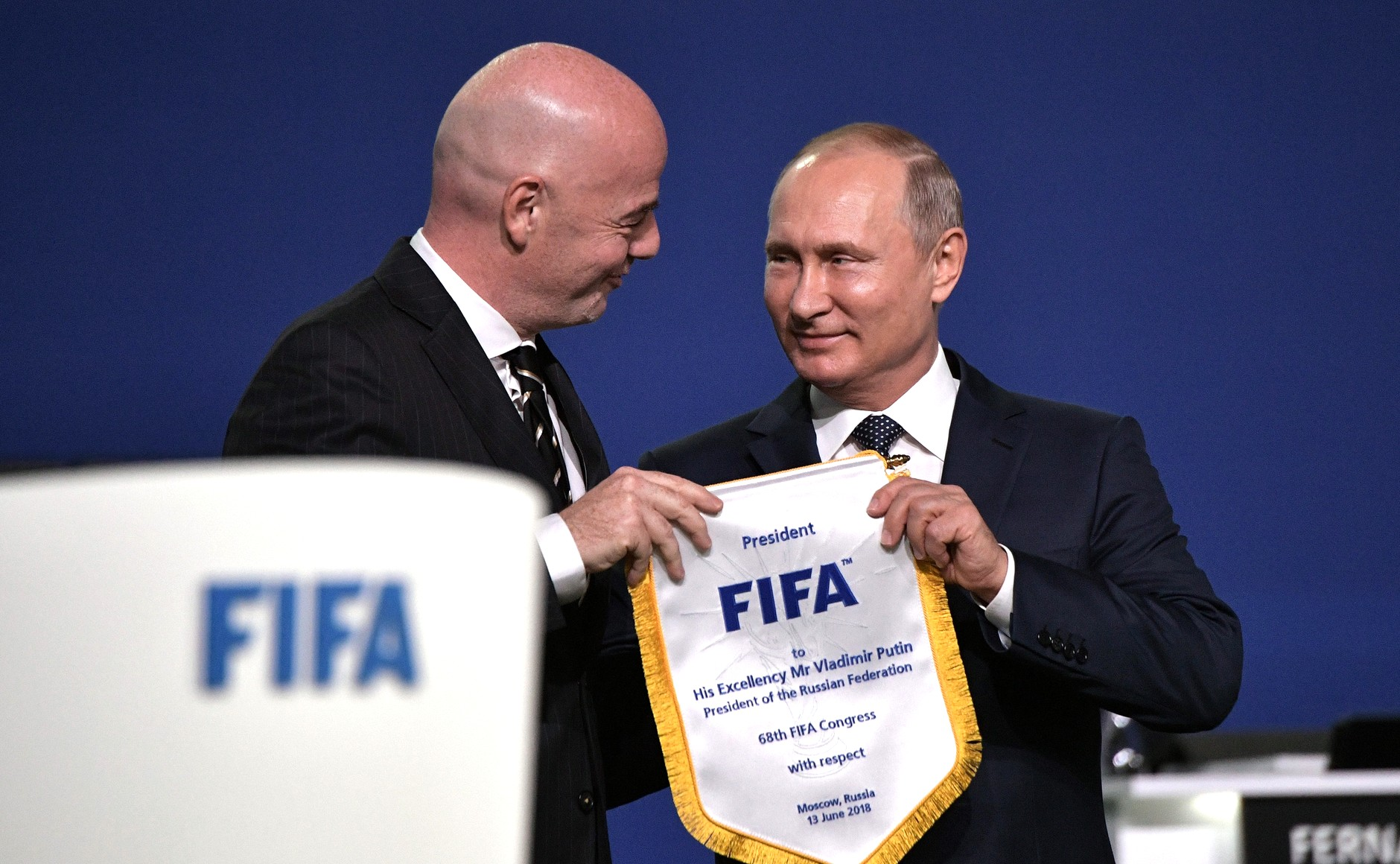
Infantino with Russian President Vladimir Putin at the 68th FIFA Congress, 13 June 2018

In March 2017, Infantino criticised the Trump travel ban on several Muslim-majority nations. He said, "When it comes to FIFA competitions, any team, including the supporters and officials of that team, who qualify for a World Cup need to have access to the country, otherwise there is no World Cup. That is obvious."

In May 2017, Infantino dismissed the independent chairmen of FIFA's Ethics Committee, Cornel Borbély and Hans-Joachim Eckert, while they were reportedly investigating his conduct. In November 2018, documents leaked to Der Spiegel revealed Infantino secretly intervened to rewrite FIFA's code of ethics, restricting preliminary investigations and instituting a 10-year statute of limitations on historical corruption. On 1 December 2018, in Buenos Aires, Infantino became the first FIFA president to be invited to a G20 summit.

Infantino was re-elected as FIFA President during the 69th FIFA Congress on 5 June 2019 as the only candidate, with the unanimous vote of all 211 member associations. During this term, he promoted reforms aimed at strengthening the social rights of women footballers. Minimum standards were introduced to support maternity, including mandatory maternity leave of at least 14 weeks, with at least two-thirds of the player's salary to be paid, and an obligation on clubs to reintegrate players into the squad and provide appropriate medical and physical support.

In July 2019, Infantino expanded the FIFA Women's World Cup from 24 to 32 teams, starting with the 2023 FIFA Women's World Cup, and doubling the tournament's prize money following the success of the 2015 and 2019 FIFA Women's World Cups, which after increasing from 16 to 24 teams set an attendance record for all non World Cup FIFA competitions. At the same time, Infantino faced severe backlash both at the 2019 Women's World Cup over unequal prize money that prompted stadium-wide chants of "Equal pay!", and later ahead of the 2023 tournament due to his remarks telling women to "pick the right battles" and "convince us men" to achieve equality.

After the 1979 Islamic Revolution, women were banned from stadiums when men's teams were playing. As FIFA president, Infantino repeatedly warned the Iranian Football Federation and the government of the Islamic Republic of Iran about Iranian women's rights. In September 2019, Infantino stated: "Our position is clear and firm. Women have to be allowed into football stadiums in Iran. Now is the moment to change things."

==== 2020–2024 ====
In 2020, Infantino joined the International Olympic Committee (IOC). He was elected with 63 in favour and 13 against, and this ended FIFA's five-year absence from the IOC. Infantino unsuccessfully lobbied for a biennial World Cup in 2021, but retreated in March 2022 after fierce opposition from UEFA and major domestic leagues over player welfare and financial concerns. Following the announcement of the European Super League, Infantino condemned the proposal during an address at the 2021 UEFA Congress. Referring to both the breakaway competition and the participating clubs' intention to remain in their domestic leagues, he stated: "If some elect to go their own way then they must live with the consequences of their choice, they are responsible for their choice. Concretely this means, either you are in, or you are out."

In 2022, Infantino expanded FIFA's Club World Cup from a seven-team annual event to a quadrennial, 32-team tournament with a $1 billion prize pool and a new trophy on which Infantino's name is engraved twice, describing him as the competition's "founding president". On 16 December 2022, the FIFA Council ruled Infantino's first three years in office did not count towards the 12-year term limit, legally allowing him to remain president until 2031. On 16 March 2023, Infantino was re-elected by acclamation for a further four-year term until 2027.

During his presidency, Infantino promoted reforms concerning the rights of women footballers. In 2020, FIFA's regulations introduced a minimum of 14 weeks of paid maternity leave and Infantino said the reforms were intended to give female players greater career stability and ensure that those taking maternity leave would not have to fear losing their place in the game. In 2024, FIFA further extended these protections to coaches and introduced provisions covering adoption, family leave, and menstrual health. FIFPRO subsequently noted that the implementation of FIFA's maternity protections remained inconsistent among clubs, while launching its own guidance on pregnancy and return to play in 2024.

Conversely, a 2024 human rights report by FairSquare criticised Infantino for operating a "system of patronage" that reversed 2016 anti-corruption governance reforms, specifically by expanding the number of standing committees from nine to 35.

==== 2025–present ====
During a FIFA Council meeting on 5 March 2025, Infantino stated that the FIFA Women's World Cup would be expanded to 48 teams. Infantino emphasised that the expansion would help more FIFA members develop their women's programmes as a result of tournament participation. During the European Football Clubs general assembly on 9 October 2025, Infantino reportedly told the delegates to "keep an open mind" about scheduling the FIFA World Cup, which has traditionally been held during the European summer from June to August, in winter months, stating that limiting the tournament's scheduling would prevent the globalisation of football as the current scheduling is too hot to play in some countries.

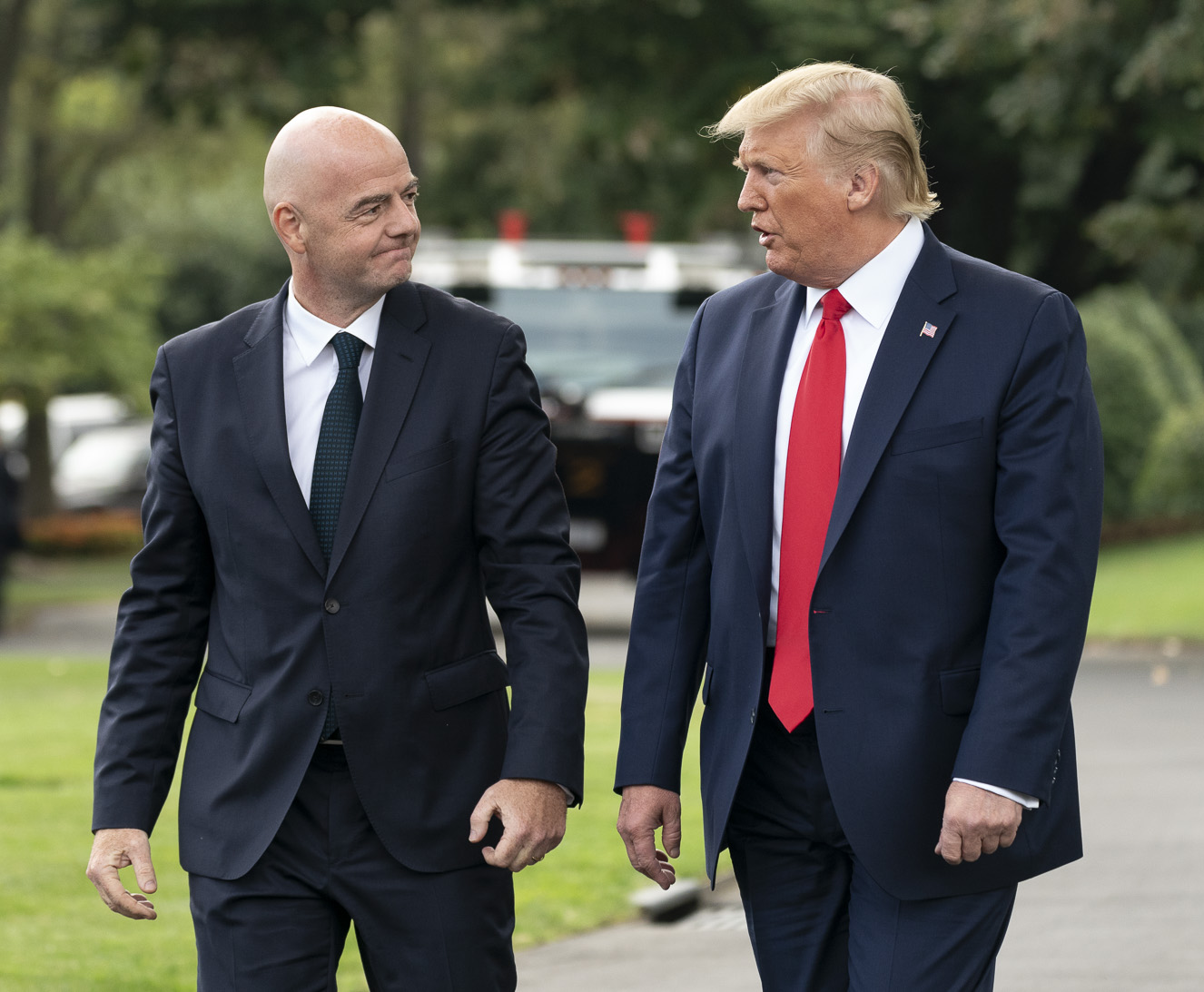
Infantino with US President Donald Trump in 2019

In November 2025, Infantino introduced the FIFA Peace Prize, with US President Donald Trump receiving the inaugural award in Washington, D.C., in December 2025. The award and its recipient drew criticism, given that Trump expressed dismay at not being awarded that year's Nobel Peace Prize. Later in July 2026, reports stated that Trump was considering Infantino as his preferred candidate for the position of United Nations Secretary-General.

Under Infantino, FIFA's revenues have more than doubled; for the 2027–2030 cycle, the organisation is projected to generate $14 billion, of which $2.7 billion, or about 20%, is to be redistributed to national associations through the FIFA Forward development programme. The number of FIFA committees has grown from seven to thirty-five under Infantino. From 2016 to 2026, Infantino quadrupled grants to member associations.

In July 2026, Infantino proposed plans to sell a minority stake of FIFA Forward Enterprise (FFE), a proposed event management company – frequently labelled as "stake in the World Cup" – to private investors, causing a fracture within the football world. The Times reported that Infantino could become FFE's commissioner after his FIFA presidency ends in 2031, with compensation potentially comparable to the reported annual salary of NFL commissioner Roger Goodell, estimated at around $64 million. Infantino's proposal was ultimately discontinued after opposition and boycott threats from multiple football associations. The proposed FFE prompted an emergency governance meeting in Morocco over Infantino's leadership of FIFA and his planned 2027 re-election bid. Infantino later travelled to Colombia and the Dominican Republic to shore up support for his re-election campaign, drawing criticism from some CONCACAF members over his Caribbean meetings.

In August 2026, amid the governance crisis over the FFE and threats of funding cuts to member associations, the Italian Football Federation (FIGC) officially announced it would withdraw its support for Infantino's 2027 re-election campaign. Conversely, several former players, including FIFA Legends members and former Argentina and Inter Milan players, such as Esteban Cambiasso, Fabio Cannavaro, Marco Materazzi, Javier Pastore, Christian Vieri, and Javier Zanetti, signed a joint letter publicly endorsing Infantino, praising his decade-long efforts in increasing player representation within FIFA's decision-making committees.

On 27 August, UEFA declared a loss of confidence in Infantino, demanding his resignation and a change in leadership; the governing body also announced it was preparing to bring criminal claims against Infantino in Switzerland, accusing him of "criminal mismanagement" over the failed FFE plan, while filing a discovery request in a US District Court to access FIFA documents deemed "probative". On 3 September, in response to the controversies and scandals, FIFA accused UEFA of conducting a "smear campaign" against the organisation and its leadership in connection with the FFE dispute. On 6 September, FIFA confirmed that Infantino would seek re-election for a fourth term in March 2027, following his announcement in April that he would stand for the 2027–2031 term, with a FIFA spokesperson saying that "nothing has changed".

=== Tournaments ===
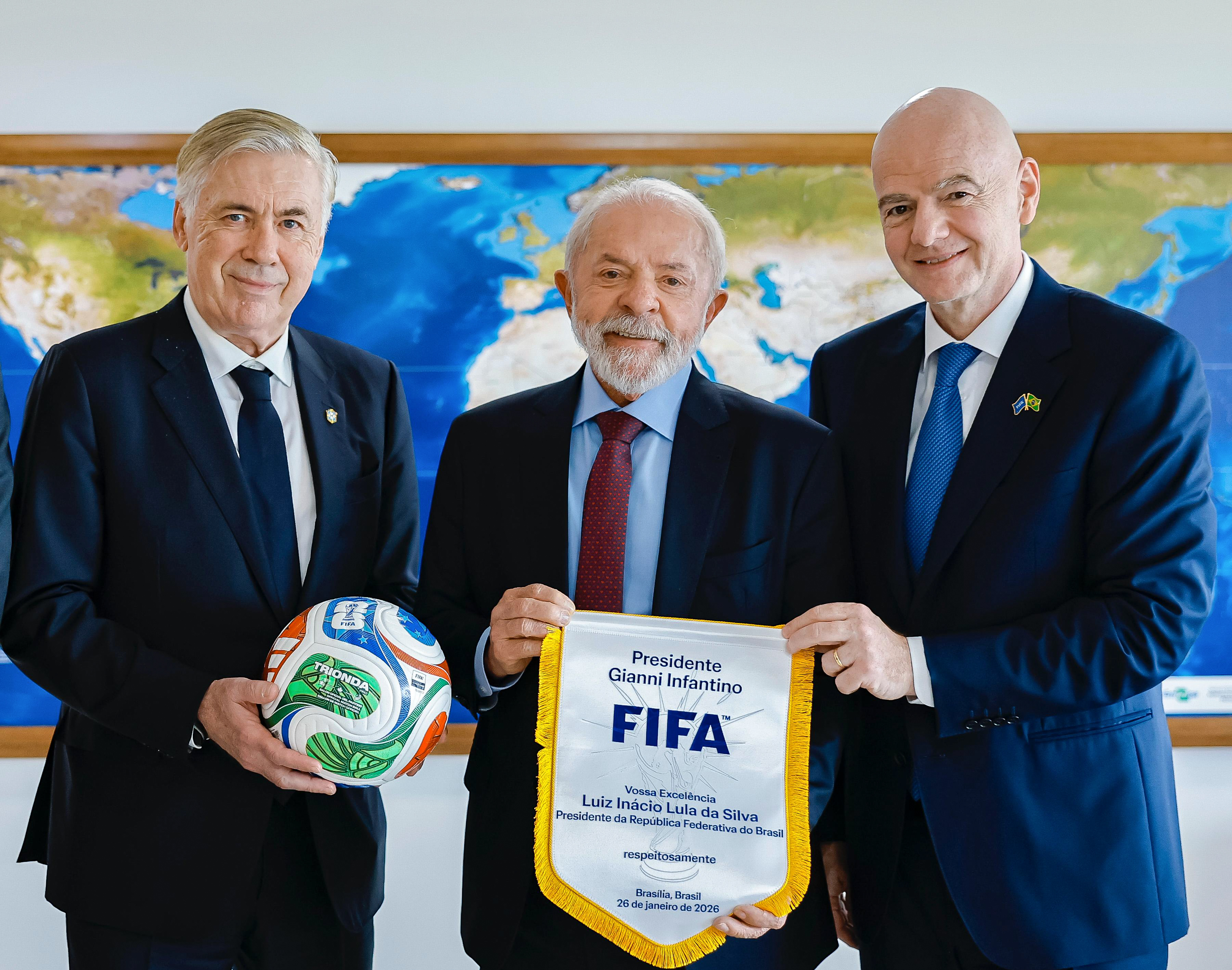
Infantino with Brazilian President Luiz Inácio Lula da Silva and football manager Carlo Ancelotti in 2026

Infantino described the 2018 FIFA World Cup as the "best World Cup ever", despite the controversial host selection of Russia. When questioned about abuses suffered by migrant workers involved in preparations for the 2022 FIFA World Cup in Qatar, Infantino said that migrant workers were given work and pay and were proud to contribute to constructing the stadiums. Infantino also charged Western countries with "hypocrisy" for criticising Qatar on moral grounds in relation to issues regarding human rights related to migrant workers, LGBTQ individuals, and women. In an hour-long monologue, he told reporters: "What we Europeans have been doing for the last 3,000 years, we should be apologising for the next 3,000 years before starting to give moral lessons."

Before the 2022 World Cup, Infantino defended Qatar's human rights record in a heavily criticised speech, stating "Today I feel Qatari... Today I feel gay... Today I feel a migrant worker." Simultaneously, FIFA threatened yellow cards against European captains wearing the pro-LGBTQ+ "OneLove" armband, which was defended by Infantino. Infantino has faced criticism for his extensive use of a private jet provided by Qatar during the tournament, emitting an estimated 300–500 metric tons (300–490 long tons; 330–550 short tons) of carbon dioxide.

In July 2026, it was reported that US President Donald Trump had controversially called Infantino and asked FIFA to review the red card issued to United States forward Folarin Balogun during the match between United States and Bosnia and Herzegovina. FIFA subsequently suspended Balogun's automatic one-match ban but Infantino denied there was political interference, stating the disciplinary committee was fully independent. That month, La Liga president Javier Tebas publicly called for Infantino's resignation, accusing him of "destroying the football industry" through the continual expansion of international tournaments at the expense of domestic leagues.

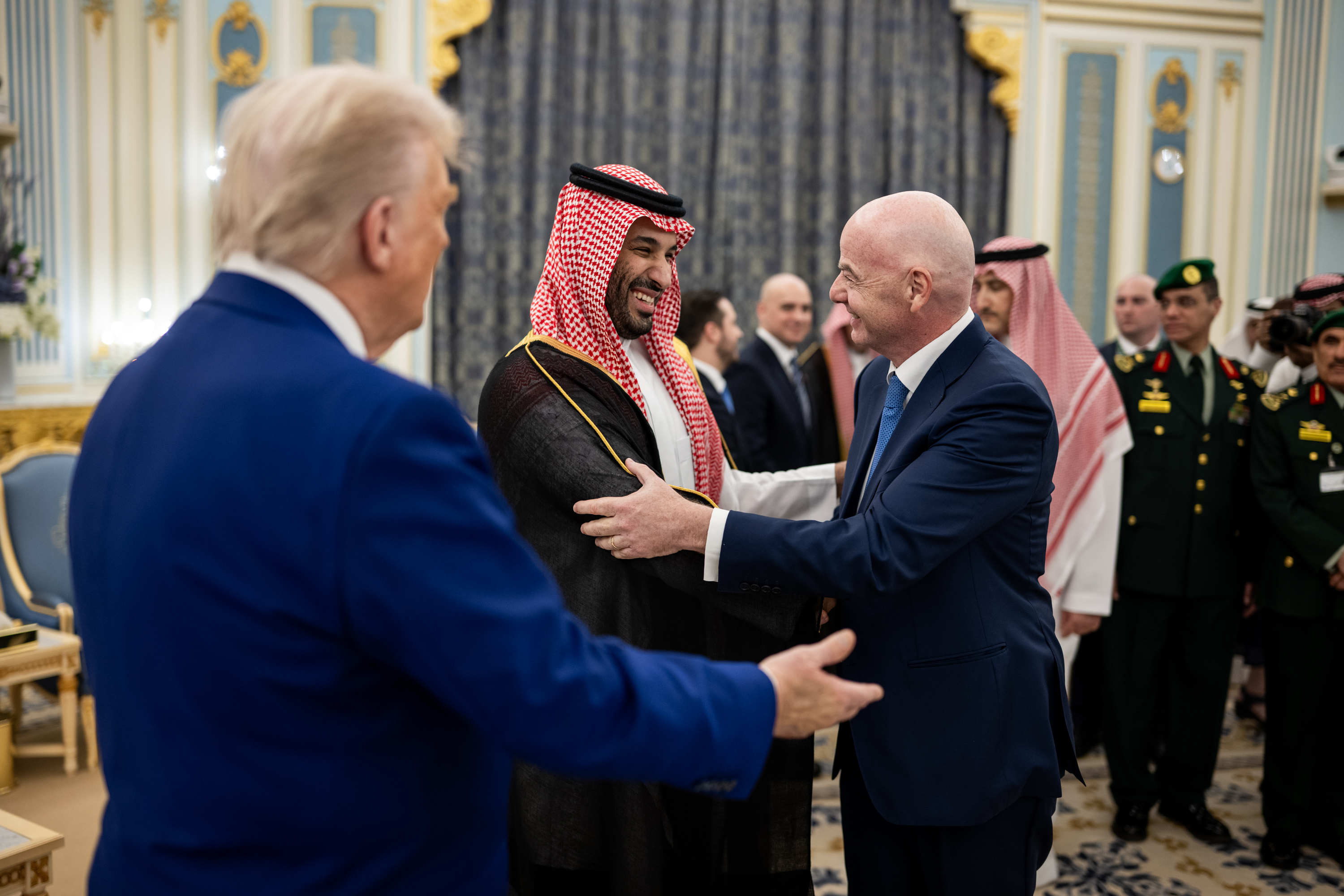
Infantino with Saudi ruler Mohammed bin Salman and Donald Trump, 2025

Infantino had unexpectedly sped up the bid process for the 2030 FIFA World Cup to effectively ensure that the two bids for 2030 and 2034 would effectively be single bids for Spain, Portugal, Morocco and Saudi Arabia. Infantino supported expanding this World Cup to 64 teams, arguing that smaller nations should have more opportunities to participate.

In line with a long-standing relationship with the Saudi regime, Infantino announced that Saudi Arabia would host the 2034 FIFA World Cup. He had urged the AFC to fully support and unite around the Saudi bid, discouraging other AFC members from submitting their own bids. The process was criticised by human-rights organisations and figures within football, and commentators noted that it coincided with Saudi-linked financing of Infantino's expanded Club World Cup.

== Management style ==
According to The New Yorker, former colleagues have described Infantino as maintaining tight personal control over FIFA; one former council member said "he decides everything by himself". Infantino's Instagram account, with 4.2 million followers and a restricted comments section, functions as FIFA's principal public-messaging channel. He has described FIFA as "the official happiness provider to humanity". In a 887-word statement in 2026, Infantino criticised sports journalism in world football calling critics of his FIFA tenure "hypocritical" and counter-productive.

As a lifelong supporter of Inter, Infantino is often seen celebrating the club's milestones, such as the 2026 scudetto. His public alignment with Inter and subsequent comments have drawn criticism regarding his neutrality as the FIFA president. In a controversial March 2018 interview prior to the Derby della Madonnina with AC Milan, he stated that Inter's history is "a beautiful one that has moved millions of people" and that it is "a slightly crazy team that makes us suffer", and added that it is "perhaps also thanks to being an Inter fan that I went on to become the FIFA president". In April 2022, Infantino sparked controversy and faced backlash from Juventus supporters after jokingly celebrating a Juventus defeat and an Inter victory, stating it was the "ideal day" because "Fiorentina won and Juventus lost", before adding that "Inter also won, so I am happy too".

Infantino's management style has been characterised by an increasingly centralised approach to FIFA's governance and by an emphasis on expanding the organisation's competitions, revenues, and political influence. Infantino was initially elected as a reformist figure and introduced a number of measures that appeared to make FIFA more transparent and democratic; however, these reforms were subsequently accompanied by the re-emergence of patronage networks and a growing concentration of power in the presidency. This shift was symbolised by his decision to retain the 2018 and 2022 World Cups controversially awarded under his predecessor, Sepp Blatter, and by his choice to appear alongside Vladimir Putin and Mohammed bin Salman at the opening match of the 2018 tournament rather than with the respective football federation presidents.

Commentators have described Infantino's presidency as involving a substantial expansion of FIFA's political and institutional influence, an expansion that has also been reflected in the scale and global reach of FIFA's competitions and in Infantino's increasingly prominent public and political role. In 2026, sociologist Pippo Russo characterised FIFA under Infantino as increasingly intertwined with international geopolitics, while noting the expansion of the organisation's competitions and commercial reach. Historian Nicola Sbetti similarly argued that Infantino's strategy has centred on expanding and multiplying FIFA competitions while consolidating his control over the organisation and its distribution of resources.

A July 2026 analysis published by The Athletic, the sports section of The New York Times, argued that Infantino had emerged from the 2026 World Cup with his position strengthened, noting that officials from a range of confederations and football organisations saw little prospect of an organised challenge to his presidency. His close relationship with political leaders, particularly US President Donald Trump, has become an increasingly prominent feature of his public role. By August 2026, there were reported signs of growing internal opposition to Infantino after FIFA vice-president Sandor Csányi withdrew his support and a petition calling for Infantino's resignation was launched.

== Personal life ==
Infantino is married to Leena Al Ashqar from Lebanon through whom he holds Lebanese citizenship. On 25 November 2025, as the non-Lebanese husband cannot acquire Lebanese citizenship by marriage to a Lebanese woman, Infantino was symbolically granted citizenship for "his role in developing the game and his continued support for Lebanese football", officially becoming a citizen of Lebanon on 16 February 2026. Infantino and his Lebanese-born wife have four daughters: Shania Serena, Alessia, Dhalia Nora, and Sabrina. He speaks French, German, and Italian as mother tongues, and also speaks English, Portuguese, Spanish, and has limited proficiency in Arabic. Since October 2021, he has spent time in Doha, Qatar, where he rents a house and where two of his children attend school. He moved his official residency to Zug, Switzerland, in June 2022.

== Honours and awards ==
=== Honours ===
- Bolivia: Grand Cross of the Order of the Condor of the Andes (2016).
- Colombia: Officer of the Order of Boyacá (2022).
- Congo: Commander of the Congolese Order of Merit (2019).
- Indonesia: First Class of the Order of the Star of Service (2023).
- Italy: Gold Collar for Sporting Merit (2017).
- Kosovo: Presidential Medal of Merit (2025).
- Mongolia: Friendship Medal (2026).
- Niger: Commander of the Order of Merit of Niger (2017).
- Russia: Medal of the Order of Friendship (2018).
- Uzbekistan: Medal of the Order of Do'stlik (2025).

=== Distinctions ===
- Asian Football Confederation: Diamond of Asia (2023).
- Bolivian Football Federation: Grand Gold Medal of Merit (2025).
- CONMEBOL: South American Football Order of Merit (2024).
- Italian National Olympic Committee: Gold Collar for Sports Merit (2017).
- National Olympic Committee of the Kyrgyz Republic: Gold Order (2023).

Sporting positions
Preceded by Lars-Christer Olsson	UEFA Chief Executive; 2007	Succeeded by David Taylor
Preceded by David Taylor	UEFA General Secretary; 2009–2016	Succeeded by Theodore Theodoridis (ad interim)
Preceded by Issa Hayatou (acting)	FIFA President; 2016–present	Succeeded by Incumbent
