= List of 2018 FIFA World Cup controversies =

Controversies surrounding the 2018 FIFA World Cup in Russia

As with the 2014 Winter Olympics, the choice of Russia as host of the 2018 FIFA World Cup was challenged. Controversial issues included the level of racism in Russian football and the discrimination against LGBT people in wider Russian society. The Russo-Ukrainian war also caused calls for the tournament to be moved, particularly following the annexation of Crimea and support of separatists in the war in Donbas. The then FIFA President Sepp Blatter declined requests for the tournament to be moved.

The 2015 allegations and criminal investigations of corruption, including a Swiss inquiry into the bidding process for the 2018 World Cup, intensified the public discussion of the appropriateness of Russia as the World Cup venue. In late May 2015, Russia's president Vladimir Putin said that he viewed the corruption investigations as an attempt by the U.S. to oust Sepp Blatter from his post as punishment for his support of Russia as host for the 2018 World Cup.

== Allegations of corruption ==
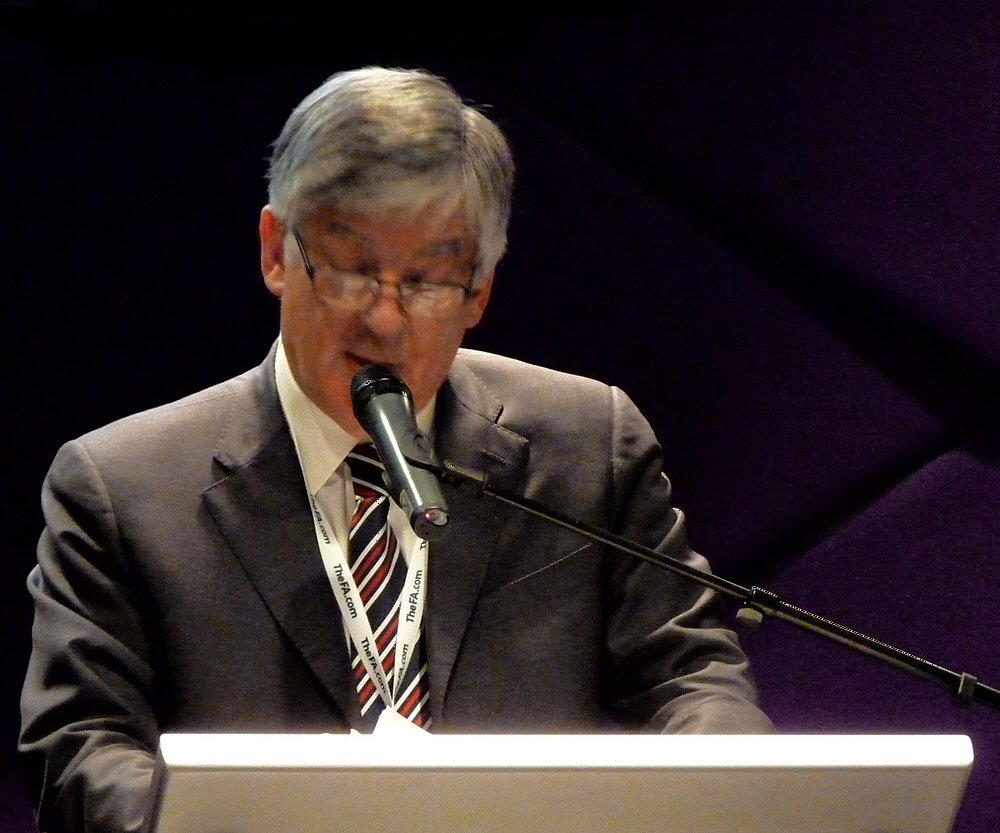
In 2014, England's Football Association chairman David Bernstein called for all UEFA nations to boycott the 2018 and 2022 World Cups due to allegations of corruption in the bidding processes

The English FA, which competed against Russia to host the tournament, was not satisfied by the 42 page summary released by FIFA, in November 2014, of the 350 page Garcia Report, which cleared both Russia and Qatar of corruption in the bidding processes for the 2018 and 2022 World Cups. FA Chairman Greg Dyke called for a re-investigation of the claims, while his predecessor David Bernstein called on all UEFA nations to boycott the two tournaments.

Reinhard Rauball, President of the Deutsche Fußball Liga (DFL), called on UEFA to secede from FIFA unless the corruption investigation was released in full.

Anatoly Vorobyov said "We have enough disciplinary measures which are laid out in our regulations. On the other hand, perhaps they need to be used more strictly".

In an interview published on 7 June 2015, Domenico Scala, the head of FIFA's Audit And Compliance Committee, stated that "should there be evidence that the awards to Qatar and Russia came only because of bought votes, then the awards could be cancelled".

== Russo-Ukrainian war ==
=== Crimea ===
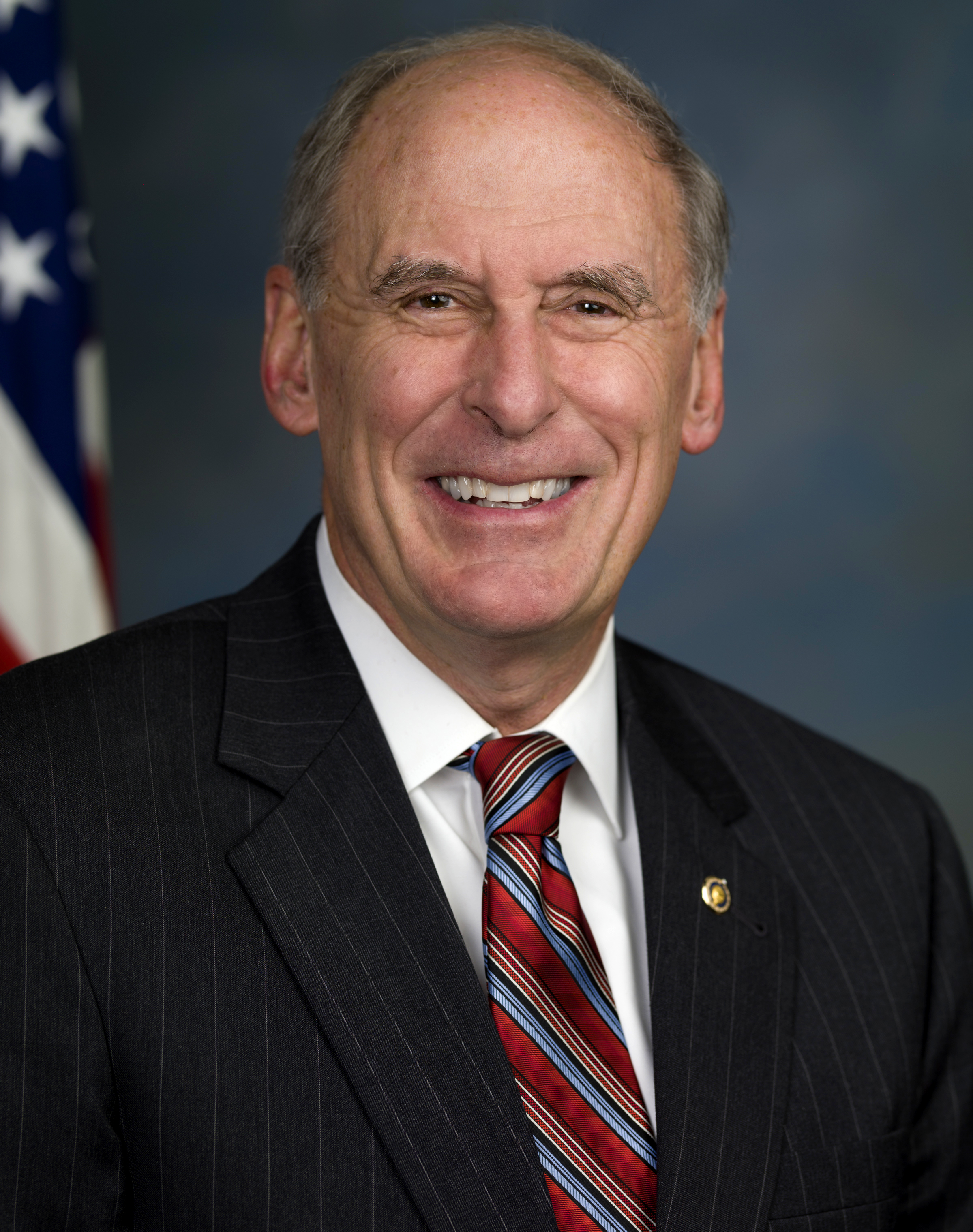
U.S. Senator Dan Coats wrote to Sepp Blatter requesting that Russia be barred from the 2018 World Cup due to its annexation of Crimea

The annexation of Crimea by the Russian Federation in 2014 led to several British and American politicians calling on FIFA to overturn its decision of hosting the 2018 World Cup in Russia — British Shadow Secretary of State for Health Andy Burnham said that football's governing body should reconsider, while two American Republican senators, Dan Coats and Mark Kirk, wrote a joint letter to FIFA president Sepp Blatter saying Russia should not only be prevented from hosting a World Cup but also be banned from participating in it, bringing up the precedent of Yugoslavia being banned from Euro '92 and the 1994 World Cup as course of action to be followed in this case and proclaiming equivalence between Russia hosting the Cup with the appeasement of the Nazis and Adolf Hitler in the 1930s before World War II. In March 2014 Blatter declined their request and responded by saying: "The World Cup has been given and voted to Russia and we are going forward with our work".

=== Deployment of troops in Eastern Ukraine ===
Following several reports of direct military involvement of Russian troops in Eastern Ukraine, European diplomats revealed on 29 August 2014 that British Prime Minister David Cameron was working for Russia to be stripped of its hosting of the World Cup, as part of an extended sanctions package. Some days later it was revealed that this was on the list of proposals for extended EU sanctions against Russia. However, no immediate action was taken due to the fact that the proposal was made nearly four years before the tournament.

==== Malaysia Airlines Flight 17 ====
In July 2014, after Malaysia Airlines Flight 17 was shot down, Western leaders blamed Russia and there were again calls for the tournament to be moved. Michael Fuchs, a parliamentarian in the German government, stated his belief that moving the tournament would have more impact than sanctions on Russia. The German FA (DFB) did not comment on the issue, although its Dutch counterpart (KNVB), representing the country with the most victims in the disaster, declared that such discussion should wait until the investigation of the accident.

Nick Clegg, the then–Deputy Prime Minister of the United Kingdom, also stated his belief that due to the crash Russia should be stripped of the World Cup. The Prime Minister, David Cameron, did not share this idea, but appreciated the concern. Sepp Blatter said that the tournament should be a "force for good".

== Events after Russia winning to host the World Cup ==
=== Racism ===
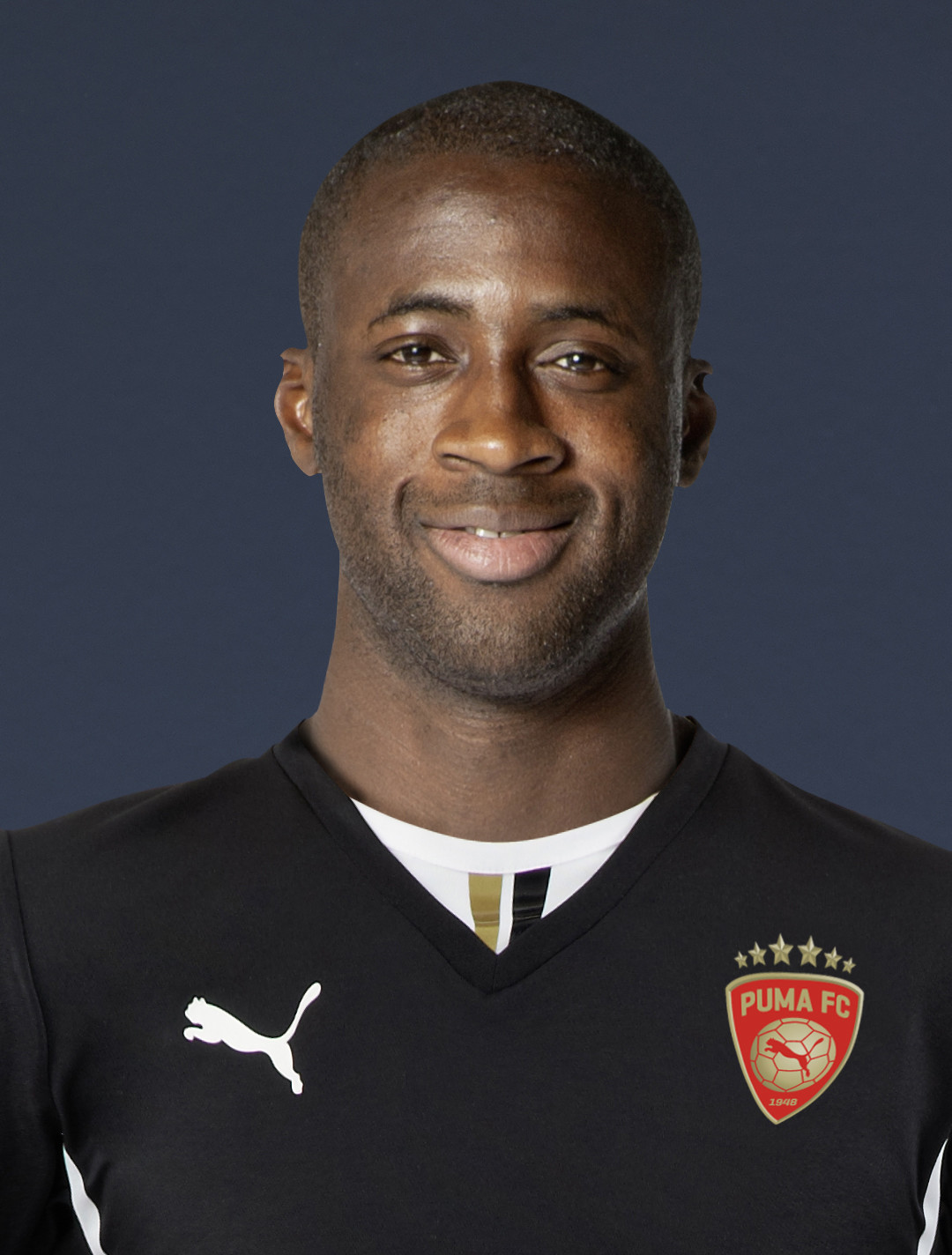
Yaya Touré said in 2013 that black footballers could boycott the tournament if actions were not taken against racism in Russian football

After it was announced that Russia would host the 2018 World Cup, Dr Rafał Pankowski, a head of UEFA FARE Monitoring Centre, accused the Russian Football Union of downplaying racist chants in stadiums. In October 2013, after allegedly being racially abused by fans of the Russian club CSKA Moscow, Ivorian footballer Yaya Touré stated that black players might boycott the 2018 World Cup unless Russia tackles racism in football.

On 13 July 2014, when the next World Cup was handed to Russia, Russian President Vladimir Putin said: "President Blatter puts a lot of personal effort into addressing social issues, and we hope that the preparations for the World Cup in Russia will also contribute to tasks, such as fighting drugs, racism and other challenges we face today".

In March 2015, Anatoly Vorobyov, the general secretary of the Russian Football Union, said that "not everything is going smoothly" in the campaign to eliminate the "virus" of racism from Russian football before the tournament. Later that month, Vyacheslav Koloskov, a member of the Russian bid team and former Vice President of FIFA, said that too much is made of racism in Russia, and that monkey chanting is not racist.

=== LGBT activism ===
In response to discrimination against LGBT people in the country, a number of petitions circulated calling for FIFA to strip Russia of hosting rights. Thousands signed these petitions, including United States senators Mark Kirk and Dan Coats and gay rights activists Greg Louganis, Stephen Fry and George Takei.

On 14 June 2018 UK-based activist Peter Tatchell was detained in Moscow by local police while staging a protest against the treatment of LGBT individuals in Russia.

=== Ban on negative news reporting ===
Russia's interior ministry ordered police not to provide negative news to the media during the World Cup and instead report only of solved crime cases to project a more positive image of the country. Russian police was instructed not to publish information about conducted raids or results of investigations into the crimes such as robberies and murders.

== UK response, reception and the British media ==
UK news media had repeatedly warned English football fans travelling to Russia of potential hooligan violence, anti-British hostility and racist intimidation. English fans who have travelled have said they received a warm welcome after arriving in Russia. The Independent reported that "Most of the English fans blamed the low attendance for a 2-1 win on what they described as alarmist press stories." Also Polish media reported on the friendly reception of Polish fans in Moscow and fears of repeated violence between Polish and Russian fans in Warsaw 2012 have not been met.

=== England's failed attempt to stage the 2018 World Cup ===
The Daily Telegraph reported in June 2017 that the former Prime Minister David Cameron and Prince William, Duke of Cambridge "were at a meeting during which a vote-swapping deal between England and South Korea was discussed, according to an official report ... At one point officials discussed the possibility of arranging a meeting with the Queen for one FIFA representative whose vote could have helped England."

=== Skripal poisoning and aftermath ===
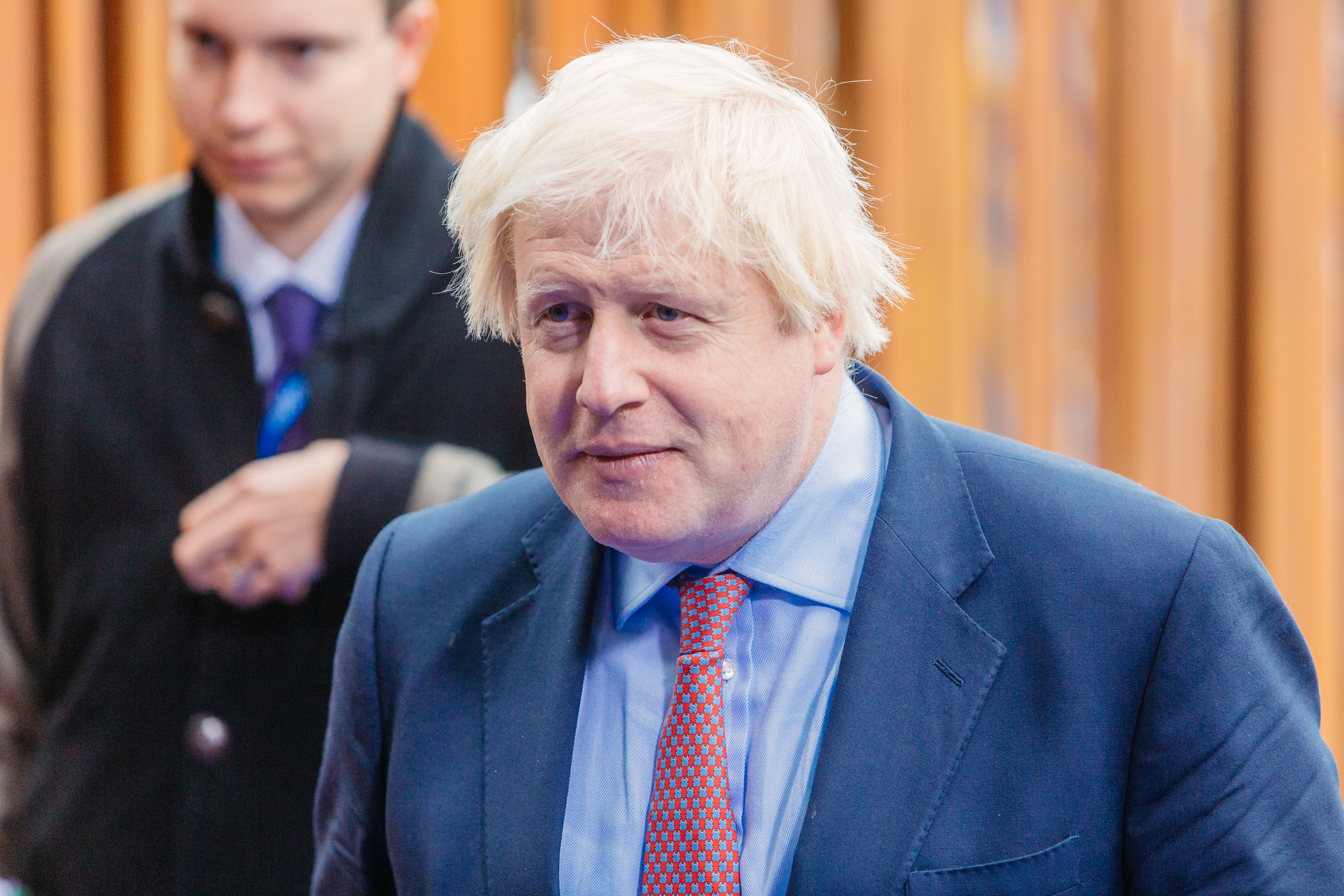
British Foreign Secretary Boris Johnson

On 14 March 2018, following the poisoning of former spy Sergei Skripal and his daughter in Salisbury in the United Kingdom, the British government announced that all official visits to the World Cup were suspended. No ministers or members of the Royal Family will attend matches or other ceremonies. The participation of the England team would not be affected. On 21 March, British Foreign Secretary Boris Johnson accused the Russian government of planning to use its hosting of the World Cup for propaganda, comparing it to Nazi Germany's use of the 1936 Olympics in Berlin for such purposes. Contrarily, however, he added that it would be unfair to ban the British football teams from competing. Russia denied the accusations and denounced Johnson's statements as "unacceptable and totally irresponsible" and "poisoned with venom of hate, unprofessionalism and boorishness".

== United States sanctions against Iran ==
American company Nike stopped supplying Iran's FIFA World Cup squad members with football boots just days before their opening match in the World Cup due to the new United States sanctions against Iran. Iran team's head coach Carlos Queiroz criticized the decision.

== Use of Cossacks against protesters ==
"The new Cossacks are part of a broader movement of armed Russian nationalism," said Nikolay Mitrokhin, a senior research fellow at the University of Eastern Finland. "Most of them fought in the Donbas, and many of them took part in the occupation of Crimea. It would appear that the Kremlin is now thinking about using them in Moscow in the same way."

Don Cossacks, the volunteer paramilitary soldiers from Southern Russia who fought in Donbas during the Ukrainian conflict, were redeployed this time by the Kremlin to counter protesters and will be used to counter protesters of the World Cup.

"The new Cossacks were figures of fun, with their strange paraphernalia and dubious claims of historical lineage. But in Vladimir Putin's third term, as the Kremlin looked to create a nationalist, conservative ideology, they became influential. They began to receive significant state funding and political support."

== During the World Cup ==
=== Mexican homophobic chanting ===
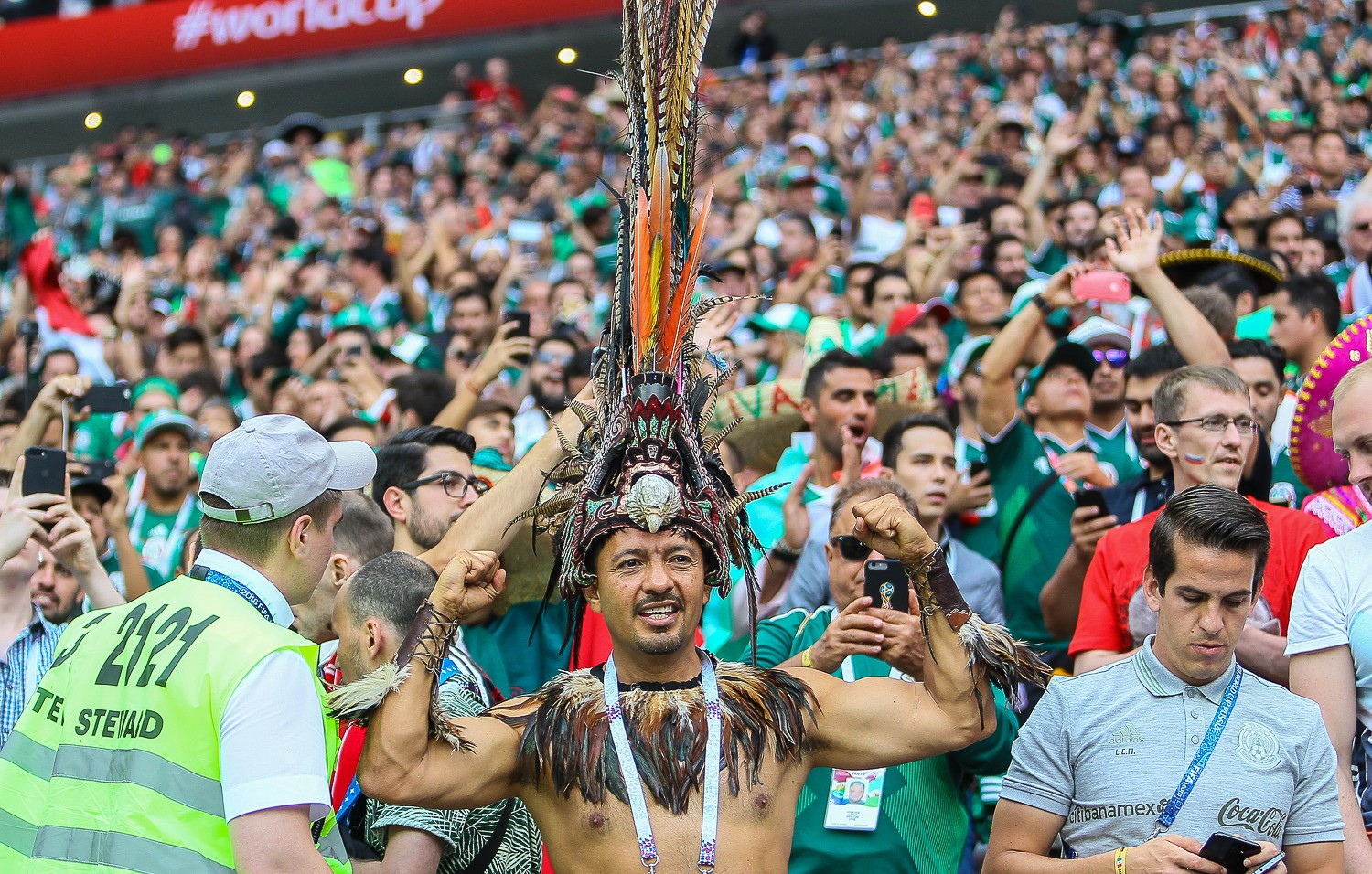
Mexico's fans at 2018 FIFA World Cup in Russia

During the Germany versus Mexico group stage match, Mexican fans chanted "puto" at German goalkeeper Manuel Neuer; "puto" is a homophobic slang for a male sex worker that Mexicans and other Latin American countries have frequently used to taunt opposing teams. The origins of the insults against Neuer have been attributed to an incorrect Spanish translation of his statement "it would be good if a professional football player came out because it would help others to do the same".

The FIFA disciplinary committee fined the Mexican Football Federation 10,000 Swiss francs ($10,400) for the homophobic chants. The Mexican Football Federation was earlier sanctioned 12 times including 10 fines for anti-gay slurs during its World Cup qualifying campaign. Mexico striker Javier Hernández posted on Instagram, "To all Mexican fans in the stadiums, don't shout 'pu--'. Let's not risk another sanction."

=== Swiss celebrations against Serbia ===
In Switzerland's 2–1 win over Serbia, Swiss goalscorers Xherdan Shaqiri and Granit Xhaka both celebrated their goals with the double-headed eagle gesture with their hands. The gesture can be interpreted as a symbol of Albanian nationalism and sometimes as symbol of the Greater Albania irredentist concept, and both Shaqiri and Xhaka are of Kosovar Albanian heritage. Kosovo, the former Serbian province that unilaterally declared independence in 2008, is a partially recognized country claimed by Serbia. Both Kosovar President Hashim Thaçi and Albanian Prime Minister Edi Rama shared their support for the celebration on social media, while it was called "a disgrace" by several Serbian newspapers. FIFA subsequently opened an investigation into the incident on 23 June. While some Serbian supporters booed the players, their general anger after the match was more directed at some debatable referee decisions rather than the goal celebrations.

During the match some Serbian fans wore shirts with pictures of war criminal Ratko Mladić, while some fans reportedly chanted anti-Albanian slogans.

On 26 June 2018 Shaqiri and Xhaka were each fined 10,000 Swiss francs by FIFA for the celebrations, although a crowd funding start-up in Albania had already raised enough money to cover the fines. Reactions to the fines imposed were mixed, some Albanian and Kosovar fans said the fine would discourage players celebrating their identity, while some Serbian fans thought that the players in question should have been banned from playing.

=== Croatian celebrations against Russia ===
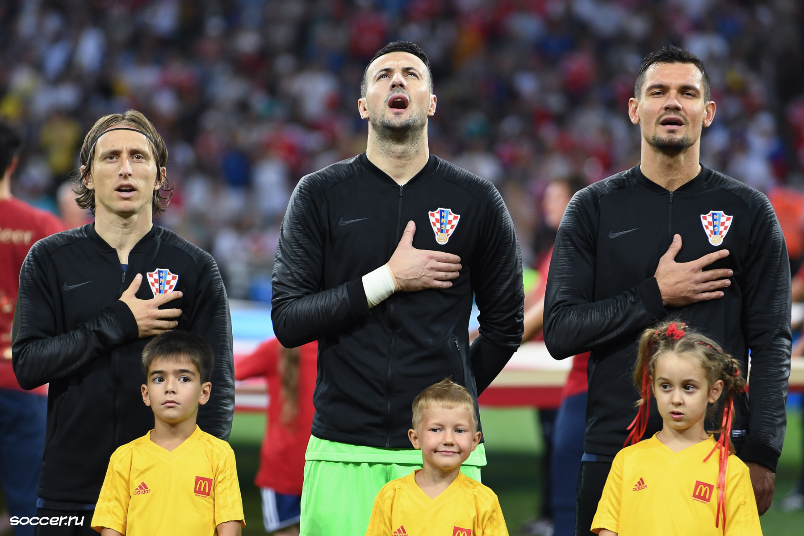
Dejan Lovren (right) and his teammates line-up for Croatia before the game with Russia, 7 July 2018

Croatian goalscorer Domagoj Vida and Croatian team's coaching staff assistant Ognjen Vukojević celebrated Croatia's World Cup victory over Russia by shouting "Glory to Ukraine!", a slogan adopted by Ukrainian nationalists. FIFA's disciplinary code prohibits political, nationalist and racist slogans in any form. Vida, celebrating the victory with former Croatian international and current assistant coach, Ivica Olić, was also recorded saying "Belgrade is on fire!" in Croatian. However, Serbian media reported "Belgrade" refers to the name of a pub in Kyiv that Vida had frequented, not the capital of Serbia, and that the phrase was used to encourage the pub to have a party. Aleksandar Holiga, editor of Croatian website Telesport, has largely downplayed the incident saying "I don't think Vida understood the full meaning and context of what he was saying. Both of them were just doing it because they are close to Dynamo Kiev. It's something that fans would chant" and that "politically, Croatia doesn't have a perfect relationship with Russia, but then who does in the rest of Europe?" BBC reported that "Ukrainians accused FIFA of siding with Russia and flooded the football body's Facebook page with declarations of "Glory to Ukraine"." After victory over England on July 11 in an interview to Russia 24 Vida said, speaking Russian, that "he was mistaken" and "apologized to Russian people". Domagoj Vida received an official warning by FIFA and Ognjen Vukojević has been fined 15,000 Swiss francs and expelled from Croatian team's coaching staff by the Croatian Football Federation.

=== Group H fair play controversy ===
Japan and Senegal finished Group H with the same number of points, the same goal difference, the same number of goals scored and a 2–2 draw as their head-to-head record. Japan beat Senegal into second place based on their fair play record, as they had fewer yellow cards (four against six).

The last two matches were played simultaneously. When Colombia scored against Senegal to go 1–0 ahead in the 74th minute, Japan went into second ahead of Senegal on the fair play rule. During their last game against Poland, the Japanese team were made aware of their advantageous position with ten minutes left and decided to play a very conservative game. They passed to one another and kept the ball in their own box, seeking to avoid any bookings. They did not attempt to score, despite being one goal behind. Poland, for their part were happy to let them do this as they were already winning but had no chance of advancing into the next round. Some fans at the match booed the players.

After the match the Japanese manager, Akira Nishino, said in an interview "I am not too happy about this, but I forced my players to do what I said. It's the World Cup, and sometimes these things can't be avoided."

However, there was widespread criticism from football figures throughout the world. Comparisons were made to the 1982 'Disgrace of Gijón'. Japanese social media users also criticised their own team. However, others defended the Japanese team and FIFA said it had no plans to drop the fair play rule, despite calls for it to do so.

=== VAR controversies ===
FIFA officially approved the use of a video assistant referee (VAR) for the 2018 FIFA World Cup during the FIFA Council meeting on 16 March 2018 in Bogotá. This tournament became the first competition to use VAR in full (at all matches and in all venues).

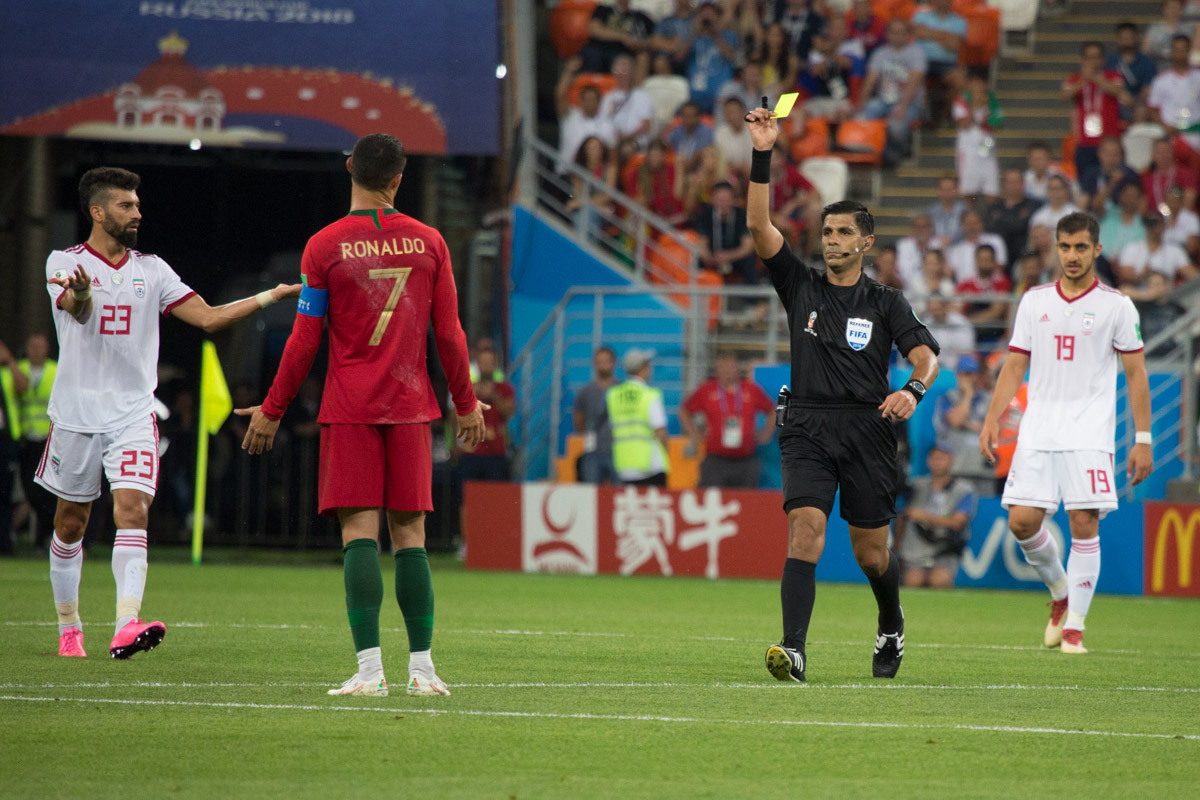
Cristiano Ronaldo (Portugal) being shown a yellow card after a challenge with Iranian player that was reviewed by referee Enrique Cáceres as a potential red card incident

After the introduction of VAR in the 2018 World Cup, FIFA deemed it a success. Nevertheless, the use (or lack of use) of VAR has been criticised. Independent assessments note that while most decisions were made correctly as a result of VAR, some were wrong despite VAR review and some decisions which were called incorrectly were not even reviewed. The Guardian concludes that VAR has been most effective for factual decisions such as offsides and mistaken identities, while subjective decisions such as penalties or the disciplining of players have fared much worse. Lack of clarity and consistency are two main areas of weakness.

A problem in consistency at the World Cup 2018 was for example the different rulings in similar game situations, which could be explained by unclear interpretation of VAR rules. For instance, in the game between Portugal and Iran in the group stage, Iran got a penalty kick after a handball by Cedric Soares, while in the game between Nigeria and Argentina, Nigeria did not get this chance after Marcos Rojo headed the ball onto his own arm, even after the referee checked the VAR.

Another line of criticism has been targeted at the effectiveness of the system in achieving its goal. In the opinion of Scott Stinson from the National Post, VAR, like any other replay system, fails to correct human error and instead only adds to the controversies because human judgment is still necessary. Lack of transparency is another contentious point, as teams have no way to know which incidents were reviewed by the VAR team. At a press conference held after the group stage, FIFA referees committee chairman Pierluigi Collina showed footage of the decision-making process accompanied with audio of the conversations between VAR officials and the referees. Asked if this audio could be made publicly available, as it is in rugby and cricket, Collina answered enthusiastically but cautioned that it might still be too early.

Others have pointed to the game-changing nature of VAR. Initial fears that using the system would lengthen the game considerably have not been confirmed, with every VAR review taking up an average of only 80 seconds. The dramatic increase in the number of penalties awarded at the 2018 World Cup has been attributed to VAR catching fouls which would otherwise have remained unpunished. Of the 169 goals scored in the tournament, 22 were from the spot (with 29 being awarded in total), beating the previous record of 17 set in the 1998 FIFA World Cup. Jonathan Liew of The Independent compares the situation to the introduction of the Decision Review System in cricket and notes the changes it had on that sport, and suggests that it might lead to changes of a similar nature in football.

Some have also pointed out that only red cards, goals, offsides and mistaken identities can be checked by VAR, while other judgements that might potentially lead to a goal cannot be checked. For example, in the 2018 FIFA World Cup final, Antoine Griezmann fell to the ground after a challenge by Marcelo Brozović. The referee awarded a free kick to France despite Croatia players protesting that Griezmann had dived. The free kick led to an own goal by Mario Mandžukić, accidentally diverting the ball into his own net. Later replays showed that Griezmann was already falling before Brozović made contact with him. Some users on social media called for the use of VAR, but VAR cannot check the incident due to the guidelines set for VAR.

Many football fans also accuse VAR of favouring "big teams". During a 2–2 draw between Spain and Morocco, a challenge from Gerard Piqué did not result in a red card for the Spanish defender, nor did the referee check VAR on multiple possible penalty calls. Fans also claim that the corner kick that led to Iago Aspas's late equaliser was played on the wrong side. There was an uproar on social media after the Group B games, with many fans claiming that Iran and Morocco have been "robbed". Moroccan midfielder Younès Belhanda criticized VAR for only helping "big teams" as well. Goalkeeper Munir Mohand Mohamedi said Morocco also felt that Cristiano Ronaldo's winning goal in the second fixture should not be allowed as Pepe appeared to foul a defender. As he left the pitch, Morocco winger Nordin Amrabat also appeared to say that the VAR system was "bullshit." Nigeria players were also furious at Rojo's "clear handball" not being called, despite the referee checking VAR. "I don't understand how that was not a penalty," Mikel said. "It was a clear handball. If you look at this game yesterday against Portugal, this was even worse. He [Rojo] had the ball and it hit his hand and it was open. Maybe the referee didn't want to give a second penalty," Mikel said. "For us, we've seen the replay, it was a clear handball. He looked at the VAR, the ball hit the hand. I asked him for explanation, did the ball hit the hand? He said `Yes.' Why is it not a penalty? He did not know."

During the World Cup final, Croatia winger Ivan Perišić's arm appeared to make contact with the ball. Some experts claimed that Perišić's arm deliberately moved towards the ball, as shown in slow-motion. However, some argue that it was a natural movement, and Perišić did not have enough time to react after Blaise Matuidi failed to head the ball. Some fans and experts argue that due to the fact that VAR is in slow-motion, it made Perišić's handball look bad.

=== Russian pension reform ===
On the opening day of the World Cup (14 June) the authorities of Russia announced the extremely unpopular pension reform presuming a substantial increase of the retirement age. Ordinary Russian citizens accused their government and president of trying to hide such information amid the euphoria of the tournament, i.e. to use the event as a cover. Alexei Navalny interpreted this reform as a “robbery of tens of millions of people”.

=== Sexism ===
Late in the tournament FIFA requested that television and photographic coverage of fans at matches should give less emphasis to attractive young women. One Russian fan shown several times in the telecast of the opening match turned out to be a glamour model. Getty Images apologised for publishing a gallery of "the hottest fans at the World Cup". There were reports of Russian women and female media personnel being harassed by male fans. A Brazilian reporter was commended for upbraiding a man who attempted to kiss her during a live broadcast. Patrice Evra was accused of patronising fellow player-turned-pundit Eni Aluko after applauding a point made by her during ITV's coverage.

==== Burger King social media campaign ====
Burger King issued an apology for an insensitive advertisement that was launched on the Russian social media outlet VK, promising a payment of $47,000 plus a lifetime supply of Whoppers, for any Russian woman if they were to become pregnant with a child fathered by a World Cup player. The ad claimed the women should get "the best football genes" and "ensure the success of the Russian team for generations to come", following the trend of playing on sexist stereotypes that are seen often in Russian ads.

=== Riots in France ===
Violence and riots erupted in Paris, Lyon, Marseille and Toulouse across the country after the French World Cup victory. Three French football supporters died while celebrating.

== See also ==
- Concerns and controversies at the 2014 Winter Olympics
