= Lorenzo Infantino =

Italian philosopher

Lorenzo Infantino (8 January 1948 – 18 January 2025) was an Italian philosopher and economist.

== Life and career ==
Infantino was born in Gioia Tauro on 8 January 1948. He was a professor of Philosophy of Social Sciences at LUISS Guido Carli University in Rome. He had a diverse academic background, having studied economics, sociology, Italian politics, and epistemology. A significant portion of his research has been conducted at the University of Oxford, particularly at Linacre College. In a review in the "Times Literary Supplement," Kenneth Minogue described him as a "scholar with an Anglo-Austrian orientation." Indeed, Infantino's intellectual pursuits align closely with the traditions forged by Friedrich A. von Hayek, who skillfully integrated insights from Mandeville, the Scottish moralists, and the Austrian School of Economics.

In 1983, Lorenzo Infantino received a grant from the Luigi Einaudi Foundation in Turin for his research on the Scottish historical school, with a particular focus on the writings of Adam Ferguson.

Infantino was actively involved in the dissemination of classical texts from the Austrian School. He oversaw the Italian editions of works by prominent authors such as Menger, Boehm-Bawerk, Mises, and Hayek, which have been published by Rubbettino in the "Biblioteca Austriaca" series. Additionally, his academic contributions include the publication of four key volumes:

1. "L'ordine senza piano" (1995), initially published in Italian and subsequently released in English by Routledge in London in 1998.
2. "Ignorance and Freedom" (1999), published in English in 2003.
3. "Individualism, Market, and History of Ideas" (2008).
4. "Power: The Political Dimension of Human Action" (2013), released in English in 2020 by Palgrave Macmillan.

Lorenzo Infantino's research centred on the unintended consequences of intentional human actions, emphasizing the critical role of conditions that influence social events. This approach draws heavily from the traditions of the Scottish moralists, Menger, and Hayek, highlighting human ignorance and fallibility as pivotal elements in understanding social phenomena. Infantino delves into the subject of power, distinguishing between infrasocial power arising from human interaction and public power represented by state intervention in society. Competition is viewed as a means to minimize infrasocial power, while the state should serve voluntary social cooperation.

Infantino also authored essays dedicated to important figures in liberal philosophy, including Benjamin Constant, Ludwig von Mises, Friedrich A. von Hayek, among others. In 2019, a collection of his writings titled "Seekers of Freedom" was published, and he received honours and recognition in various academic contexts.

Infantino died on 18 January 2025, at the age of 77.
