= Garcia Report =

Investigation produced by Michael J. Garcia

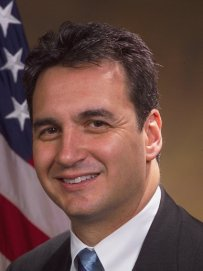
Former U.S. Attorney Michael J. Garcia led the investigation and supervised the report redaction.

The Garcia Report was an investigation produced by U.S. lawyer Michael J. Garcia into allegations of corruption in world football. On 17 July 2012, in the wake of announced anti-corruption reforms by Sepp Blatter, the president of the world association football governing body FIFA, the organization appointed Garcia as the chairman of the investigative chamber of FIFA Ethics Committee, while German judge Hans-Joachim Eckert was appointed as the chairman of the Ethics Committee's adjudication chamber.

In August 2012, Garcia declared his intention to investigate the bidding process and decision to respectively award the right to host the 2018 and 2022 World Cups to Russia and Qatar by the FIFA Executive Committee. Garcia delivered his subsequent 350-page report in September 2014, and Eckert then announced that it would not be made public for legal reasons. On 13 November 2014, Eckert released a 42-page summary of his findings after reviewing Garcia's report. The summary cleared both Russia and Qatar of any wrongdoing during the bidding for the 2018 and 2022 World Cups, leaving Russia and Qatar free to stage their respective World Cups.

FIFA issued a statement saying it welcomed "the fact that a degree of closure has been reached", while the Associated Press wrote that the Eckert summary was "denounced by critics as a whitewash". Hours after the Eckert summary was released, Garcia himself criticized it for being "materially incomplete" with "erroneous representations of the facts and conclusions", while declaring his intention to appeal to FIFA's Appeal Committee. On 16 December 2014, FIFA's Appeal Committee dismissed Garcia's appeal against the Eckert summary as "not admissible". FIFA also stated that Eckert's summary was "neither legally binding nor appealable." A day later, Garcia resigned, stating in his letter that he had lost confidence in the process and cited what he called a "lack of leadership" and lost confidence in the independence of Eckert from FIFA. In June 2015, Swiss authorities claimed the report was of "little value".

== Appointment of Garcia and Eckert ==
On 17 July 2012, in the wake of announced anti-corruption reforms by the President of the FIFA, Sepp Blatter, the organisation appointed former United States Attorney Michael J. Garcia as chairman of the investigative branch of its Ethics Committee, while German judge Hans-Joachim Eckert was appointed as Chairman of the Ethics Committee's adjudication chamber. The reformed Ethics Committee was also given the power to retrospectively investigate old cases. As Garcia and Eckert fulfilled FIFA's statute of them or their families not having a paid connection to soccer in the previous four years, The Guardian wrote that "Garcia and Eckert are regarded as key independent figures from outside the so-called 'football family' who can help restore FIFA's credibility after bribery and vote-buying scandals."

Upon their appointment, Garcia and Eckert were immediately tasked to investigate alleged illegal payments made by FIFA marketing company International Sports and Leisure (ISL) to former FIFA President João Havelange and former Executive Committee member Ricardo Teixeira, as well as to evaluate the behaviour of FIFA President Sepp Blatter in the affair. ISL had specialized in buying and selling broadcast rights to FIFA events such as World Cups on contracts worth millions of dollars. The case was closed on 30 April 2014 after an investigation by Garcia, with Eckert ruling that bribes had been paid by ISL between 1992 and 2000 to Havelange, Teixeira and Nicolas Leoz, then-President of CONMEBOL. As Havelange (honorary President of FIFA) and Leoz had already resigned from their posts earlier in April 2014, no "superfluous" further action was taken. In contrast, Blatter was exonerated of "criminal or ethical misconduct", but was also described as "clumsy" and it was questioned whether he "knew or should have known over the years before the bankruptcy of ISL that ISL had made bribes to other FIFA officials".

== Garcia investigation and remit ==
In August 2012, Garcia declared his intention to investigate the bidding process and decision to award the right to host the 2018 and 2022 FIFA World Cup to Russia and Qatar respectively by the FIFA Executive Committee.

The decision of host venues had previously taken place in December 2010. In May 2011, while before a British parliamentary inquiry, the former chairman of England's failed 2018 bid, David Triesman, accused FIFA executive committee members Jack Warner, Worawi Makudi, Nicolas Leoz and Ricardo Teixeira of requesting bribes from the English team in exchange for support. The parliamentary inquiry also received evidence from The Sunday Times that FIFA executive committee members Issa Hayatou and Jacques Anouma were reportedly bribed with $1.5m by the Qatar team. The whistleblower who spoke to The Sunday Times, Phaedra Al Majid, retracted her allegations in July 2011. In December 2011, The Daily Telegraph reported that the Federal Bureau of Investigation were investigating alleged hacking into email accounts for England and the United States' World Cup bids.

FIFA forbids bid teams to offer incentives to members of its executive committee and their relatives. Garcia subsequently expanded his investigation into the entire bidding process for the 2018 World Cup. Garcia's investigation allowed him to demand interviews with football officials, with those refusing subject to disciplinary action. Garcia was not able to interview Mohammed bin Hammam, the former FIFA vice-president, as Hammam is banned for life from football activity. Garcia's investigation remit extended solely to individuals who might have violated FIFA's code of ethics. Garcia was expected to name individuals who refused to speak to him in his report. Garcia has no ability to subpoena people to speak to him or to ask internet service providers for documents.

Garcia was assisted in his production of the report by Cornel Borbély, the deputy chairman of the investigatory chamber of the FIFA ethics committee. Borbély produced the section of the report that investigated Russia, as Garcia was sanctioned from entering the country, and the United States, to prevent a potential conflict of interest as Garcia is American. Russia was the only bidding country which Garcia failed to travel to in the course of his investigations.

== Blocked publication by Eckert ==
Garcia delivered his 350-page report in September 2014, and it was subsequently announced by Hans-Joachim Eckert, the head of the adjudicatory arm of FIFA's ethics committee, that it would not be made public for legal reasons. Eckert said that only his judgement on the report will be published, in the spring of 2015, and the report had only been seen by four people. Eckert later announced that his overview of the Garcia report with Garcia's main findings, summary, conclusions and recommendations will be published by the middle of November 2014. Eckert stated that his findings might be unpopular, saying "Many won't like what I am going to tell them" in reference to his forthcoming judgement on the report.

Eckert will only judge individuals, and will leave the decision on the hosting of the 2018 and 2022 world cups to FIFA. Garcia, along with some members of the FIFA Executive Committee, called for the Garcia report to be published in full, excepting names redacted to protect whistleblowers. Garcia has said of FIFA that its "... investigation and adjudication process operates in most parts unseen and unheard...That's a kind of system which might be appropriate for an intelligence agency but not for an ethics compliance process in an international sports institution that serves the public and is the subject of intense public scrutiny."

== Summary released and Garcia resignation ==
On 13 November 2014, Hans-Joachim Eckert released a 42-page summary of his findings after reviewing Michael Garcia's report; the summary cleared both Russia and Qatar of any wrongdoing during the bidding for the 2018 and 2022 World Cups, leaving Russia and Qatar free to stage their respective World Cups. The summary noted that Russia provided "only a limited amount of documents available for review", as the computers leased to the Russian team had been destroyed, and several email accounts were unable to be accessed.

The summary included more detailed criticisms of the bids from England and Australia, who had unsuccessful World Cup bids, finding "potentially problematic facts and circumstances" in their bids and stating that they had undermined the integrity of the bidding. England was described as behaving improperly when trying to win the support of then-CONCACAF head Jack Warner. Australia was criticized for the links between its bid and its funding of football development in African countries, and that two Australia consultants "violated the bidding and ethics rules". The bid teams for Japan and South Korea were also criticized for distributing "gifts" and giving the appearance of "a conflict or an offer of benefits" respectively.

The FIFA welcomed "the fact that a degree of closure has been reached", while the Associated Press wrote that the Eckert summary "was denounced by critics as a whitewash". Hours after the Eckert summary was released, Garcia himself criticized it for being "materially incomplete" with "erroneous representations of the facts and conclusions", while declaring his intention to appeal to the FIFA's Appeal Committee. There were several calls for the Garcia report to be released, including from FIFA Executive Committee members Jim Boyce, Jeffrey Webb and Sunil Gulati, as well as FIFA presidential candidate Jerome Champagne and English Premier League chief executive Richard Scudamore. Eckert stated he was surprised by Garcia's response and declined to release the full report, citing the "rights of confidentiality for continental law". Less than a week later, Eckert was quoted as saying that the investigation was only at "an interim stage" and that Garcia "can now continue investigating towards the final report".

On 15 November 2014, German Football League president Reinhard Rauball warned that UEFA may quit FIFA if Garcia's report is not published in full, citing that "If this doesn't happen and the crisis is not resolved in a credible manner, you have to entertain the question of whether you are still in good hands with FIFA". On 18 November 2014, acting on the recommendation of Eckert, the FIFA lodged a criminal complaint with the Swiss judiciary relating to the "possible misconduct of individual persons in connection with the awarding of the hosting rights of the 2018 and 2022 World Cup", specifically regarding "international transfers of assets with connections to Switzerland". On 16 December 2014, the FIFA's Appeal Committee dismissed Garcia's appeal against the Eckert summary as "not admissible". FIFA also stated that Eckert's summary was "neither legally binding nor appealable". A day later, Garcia resigned from his role as FIFA ethics investigator in protest of FIFA's conduct, citing a "lack of leadership" and lost confidence in the independence of Eckert from the FIFA.

== Pending release of the redacted Garcia Report ==
On 19 November 2014, following a presentation by Domenico Scala, head of FIFA's audit and compliance committee and one of only six people to have seen the report at that time, FIFA's executive committee unanimously agreed to publish a "legally appropriate version" of the Garcia report, with parts redacted to preserve witness confidentiality. However, the Garcia Report will only be published after five ongoing ethics investigations started by Garcia into the following individuals are concluded; for Ángel María Villar, Michel D'Hooghe, Worawi Makudi, Franz Beckenbauer and Harold Mayne-Nicholls. FIFA’s executive committee reaffirmed its decision not to revisit the votes for the 2018 and 2022 tournaments after Scala said that two independent legal experts he consulted supported that decision.

Walter De Gregorio, in a press conference on 27 May 2015, stated that the Garcia report has been in the hands of the Office of the Attorney General of Switzerland since 19 November 2014. As part of the criminal proceedings the report may or may not be released. One day after Bild newspaper announced it had received a copy and intended to publish it, the FIFA released the full report on 27 June 2017.
