= 2014 FIFA World Cup bids =

Football World Cup host nation bids

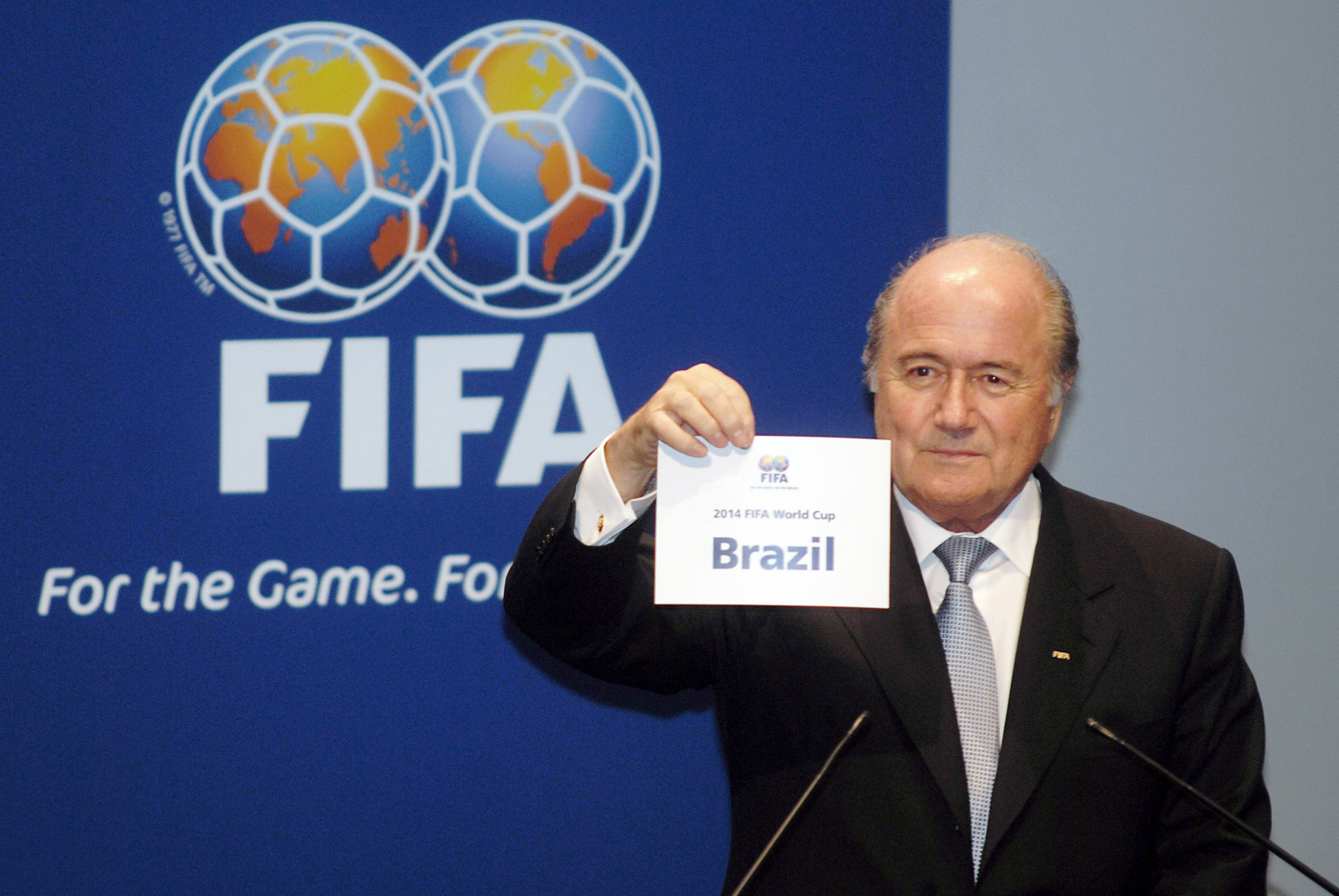
Sepp Blatter, president of FIFA, officially announcing Brazil as the host nation.

The process for determining the host nation of the 2014 FIFA World Cup concluded on 30 October 2007 with the confirmation of Brazil as the hosts.

== Background ==
On 7 March 2003, the world football body FIFA announced that the tournament would be held in South America for the first time since Argentina hosted the 1978 FIFA World Cup, in line with its policy of rotating the right to host the World Cup amongst different confederations. On 3 June 2003, CONMEBOL announced that Argentina, Brazil, and Colombia wanted to host the 2014 World Cup finals. By 17 March 2004, the CONMEBOL associations had voted unanimously to adopt Brazil as their sole candidate.

Brazil formally declared its candidacy in December 2006, and Colombia did so as well a few days later. The Argentina bid never materialized. On 11 April 2007, Colombia officially withdrew its bid, making Brazil the only official candidate to host the event in 2014.

== Official bid ==
=== Brazil ===
Brazil was the only official candidate after Colombia withdrew its bid on 11 April 2007. The Brazilian bid was officially launched on 13 December 2006 by Ricardo Teixeira, then president of the Brazilian Football Confederation, who signed the letter of candidacy in Tokyo in the presence of CONMEBOL president Nicolas Leoz and CONMEBOL general secretary Eduardo De Luca.

FIFA president Sepp Blatter stated on 4 July 2006 that the 2014 World Cup would probably be held in the country, though he acknowledged in earlier comments that the country did not have any stadiums ready for the Cup at the time. On 28 September, he met with the Brazilian President Lula, and was quoted as saying he wanted the country to prove its capabilities before making a decision. "But the ball is on Brazil's court now," he said. In September 2006, Brazil President Luiz Inácio Lula da Silva confirmed Blatter's opinion, declaring: "We don't have any stadium which is in a condition to host World Cup games. We’re going to have to build at least 12 new stadiums in this country."

On 31 July 2007, Brazil's bid became official, when the Brazilian Football Confederation president, Ricardo Teixeira, delivered personally to FIFA president, Sepp Blatter, a document containing Brazil's hosting stadiums and other required information concerning plans in improvements for general infrastructure and about finances.

Brazil's credentials included hosting the 1950 World Cup and has hosted the Copa América four times (1919, 1922, 1949, 1989, and later 2019 and 2021).

Brazil's controversial selection inspired Declan McKenna to write his protest song "Brazil" against FIFA in 2014 as he claimed they didn't realize Brazil was a "country filled with poverty affecting its citizens". McKenna also confirmed he wrote the song because "it's politics and what I negativity see in the news

== Withdrawn bids and other expressions of interest ==
=== Colombia ===
Colombia formally declared its candidacy on 18 December 2006, and withdrew it on 11 April 2007.

The president of Colombia, Álvaro Uribe, had initially announced on 15 July 2006 that Colombia would submit a bid. During his speech at the opening ceremony of the 2006 Central American and Caribbean Games, Uribe said: "By seeing how things were done to organise these Games, I think Colombia is capable of hosting a football World Cup. I'm sure we will achieve it and will do it very well." Vice President Francisco Santos Calderón was in charge of the project.

Colombia had previously been scheduled to host the 1986 FIFA World Cup, controversially withdrew and later hosted the 2011 FIFA U-20 World Cup. Colombia has hosted the Copa América once (2001). However, on 27 February 2007, FIFA president Sepp Blatter appeared to discard any Colombian chances of hosting the event, saying, "Colombia's bid is more of a public relations presentation of the country to say that we are alive not only in other headlines but also in football."

=== Australia ===
In June 2006, South Australian premier Mike Rann put forward a proposal for Australia to host the 2014 FIFA World Cup. He was backed by then Prime Minister John Howard, who said that Australia has proven it can host world sporting events. Football Federation Australia President, Frank Lowy who has also expressed considerable interest in the proposal and is amid negotiations to formally put forward Australia's hosting proposal. Australia hosted the OFC Nations Cup twice (1998, and 2004), and four way co hosted once (1996). Australia attempted to host the 2022 FIFA World Cup, but lost out to Qatar.

=== Jordan and Iraq joint bid ===
In October 2004, the football federations of Jordan and Iraq mulled a bid to host the World Cup. "The situation at the moment would make any bid ludicrous," Prince Faisal al-Hussein of Jordan was quoted as saying in his interview to The Times and The Guardian. "What will things be like in five years' time?. It could be a very prosperous nation. If the conditions are right, people will take it seriously."

=== United States ===
In June 2002, the United States Soccer Federation (USSF) announced it expressed interest to offer a bid for the 2014 FIFA World Cup. Robert Contiguglia was confident that the United States can put together a very strong bid. The United States hosted the 1994 FIFA World Cup, as well as the 1999 FIFA Women's World Cup and 2003 FIFA Women's World Cup. The United States also attempted to host the 2022 FIFA World Cup, but lost out to Qatar. It eventually won rights to the 2026 FIFA World Cup along with Mexico and Canada.
