= Dassin =

Dassin may refer to:

- Jules Dassin (1911–2008), American film director, producer, writer and actor
- Joe Dassin (1938–1980), American-born French singer-songwriter.
- Lev L. Dassin (born 1965) was the acting United States Attorney for the Southern District of New York.
