= FIFA's Dirty Secrets =

- Panorama episode
- Original air date: 29 November 2010
- Running time: 30 mins

Episode chronology
← Previous "British Schools, Islamic Rules"	Next → "Addicted to Games?"

"FIFA's Dirty Secrets" is an episode of the BBC documentary series Panorama which was broadcast on 29 November 2010.

== Overview ==
The half-hour programme saw investigative journalist Andrew Jennings look into allegations of corruption with FIFA, the world's governing body of association football. Within the programme, Jennings alleged that three members of FIFA's executive committee had received bribes by International Sports and Leisure, a marketing partner of FIFA. The three men – Nicolas Leoz, Issa Hayatou, and Ricardo Teixeira – were reportedly involved with a sports marketing firm responsible for broadcasting rights, from which they were alleged to have received payments. Jennings further alleged that a fourth official was involved in ticket reselling (ticket touting). Jennings claimed that both matters had not been adequately investigated by Sepp Blatter, the President of FIFA. It also made a series of claims about the bidding process for hosting the FIFA World Cup.

Hayatou, who is the vice-president of FIFA, denied all accusations of involvement in the scheme and claimed money was in fact paid to the Confederation of African Football (CAF). He threatened to sue the BBC for the making of the documentary.

The documentary was broadcast only three days before the result of the bidding process for the 2018 and 2022 FIFA World Cups were announced. Some commentators expressed concern that the timing of the broadcast might negatively impact England's chances of hosting the former tournament, with certain media figures and politicians accusing the BBC of being unpatriotic; however, the BBC defended these claims. Russia ultimately won the right to host the FIFA World Cup in 2018, with Qatar emerging victorious for the 2022 tournament. The question of whether the documentary was a crucial factor in England losing the contest was brought up after the result was announced.

The programme received 51 complaints from viewers.

== See also ==
- 2015 FIFA corruption case
