= FOUL! The secret world of FIFA =

2006 book

- Author: Andrew Jennings
- Publication date: 2006
- ISBN: 978-0007208708

FOUL! The secret world of Fifa: Bribes, Vote-rigging and Ticket Scandals is a 2006 book about corruption in FIFA written by investigative journalist Andrew Jennings.
