= International Sport and Leisure =

Swiss sports marketing company

- Industry: Sports marketing
- Founded: 1982; 43 years ago in Lucerne, Switzerland
- Founder: Horst Dassler
- Defunct: 2001
- Fate: Collapsed

International Sport and Leisure (ISL) was a Swiss sports marketing company that was closely bound to FIFA.

== History ==
ISL was established by former Adidas boss Horst Dassler, and was associated with FIFA, the International Olympic Committee and the International Association of Athletics Federations. It collapsed in 2001 with debts of £153 million.

In 2008, following a four-year investigation by prosecutors in the Swiss canton of Zug, six former ISL executives, including the former chairman Jean Marie Weber, were accused of a series of charges including fraud, embezzlement and the falsification of documents.

Court documents released in 2012 show that two FIFA executives, former president João Havelange and Ricardo Teixeira, received 41m CHF (£27m) worth of bribes from ISL between 1992 and 2000. Only 3m CHF of these were repaid.

In July 2012, the reformed FIFA Ethics Committee began investigating the illegal payments made by ISL, in addition to evaluating the behaviour of FIFA president Sepp Blatter in the affair. ISL had specialized in buying and selling broadcast rights to FIFA events such as World Cups on contracts worth millions of dollars. The case was closed on 30 April 2014 after an investigation by Garcia, with Hans-Joachim Eckert ruling that bribes had been paid by ISL between 1992 and 2000 to Havelange, Teixeira and Nicolas Leoz, then-president of CONMEBOL. As Havelange (honorary president of FIFA) and Leoz had already resigned from their posts earlier in April 2014, no "superfluous" further action was taken. In contrast, Blatter was exonerated of "criminal or ethical misconduct", but was also described as "clumsy" and it was questioned whether he "knew or should have known over the years before the bankruptcy of ISL that ISL had made bribes to other FIFA officials".

== See also ==
- 2015 FIFA corruption case
- Garcia Report
