= Amos Adamu =

Nigerian sports administrator (born 1952)

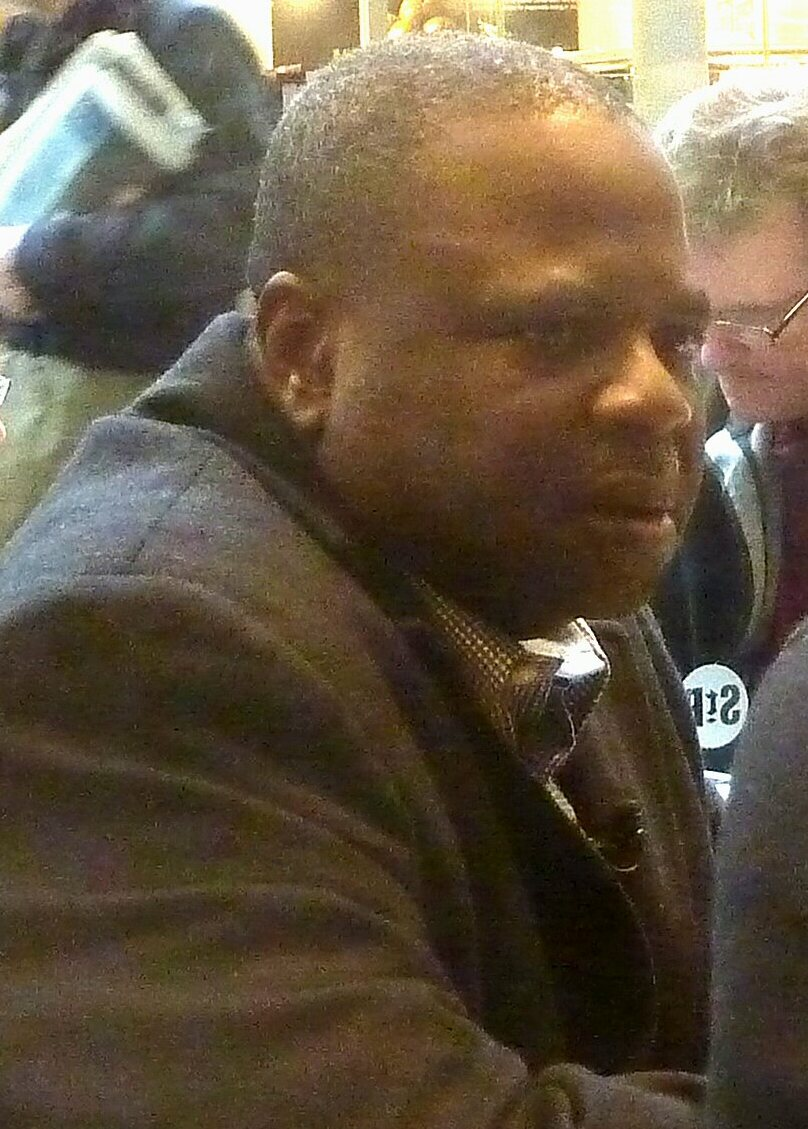
- Adamu being interviewed by BBC TV in 2010

Executive Committee member of FIFA
- In office 2006–2010

Personal details
- Born: 31 December 1952 (age 73) Ogbomosho, Oyo State, Nigeria

Amos Adamu (born 31 December 1952) is a Nigerian sports administrator. He was Director General of the Nigerian National Sports Commission for ten years before being redeployed in November 2008. Before his appointment as Director General, Adamu was the Director of Sports of the ministry for 10 years.

== Career ==
Adamu holds a doctorate degree in physical and health education. He was a university lecturer before joining the National Institute of Sports (NIS). He was appointed the Sole Administrator of the Nigeria Football Association in 1992. After success in this position, he was then posted to the Federal Ministry of Sports as Director of Sports Development. Adamu was involved in the administration and organization of the 1999 FIFA World Youth Championship in Nigeria and the Nations Cup in 2000.

In December 2000 Adamu was named President for the Organising Committee for the 8th All-Africa Games (COJA). The games were held in Abuja, October 2003, in the newly constructed Abuja Stadium. Adamu advised the government to sell this stadium immediately after the games in order to forestall the vandalisation typical of publicly owned buildings. Subsequently, there was controversy about the conduct of the games organizers.

In 2005, Adamu was picked as a member of the organizing committee for the first ever World Cup Finals in Africa to be hosted in South Africa in 2010. In 2006, Adamu led the transformation of the Sports Ministry to the National Sports Commission (NSC). Adamu became an Executive Committee member of FIFA and the Confederation of African Football. In April 2007, Adamu became the President of the West Africa Football Union.

In May 2008, the Permanent Secretary in the Ministry of Sports and Social Development in Bayelsa State told members of the Senate Committee on Sports that problems with sports in Nigeria included corruption and dominance by a "cabal" led by Adamu. In July 2008, Adamu announced that the Nigeria Sports Commission had initiated an inquiry into allegations of corruption in the local league.

== Redeployment and punished bribery ==
On 6 November 2008, President Umaru Yar'Adua ordered the removal of Adamu from the post of Director General of the National Sports Commission. Adamu, the Director General of the National Sports Commission was eventually redeployed to the Ministry of Special Duties after the removal of erstwhile Minister for Sports and Chairman National Sports Commission Abdulrahman Gimba, in a cabinet reshuffle. No reason was given. As of January 2009, Adamu was a member of FIFA's 24-man executive committee. He was scheduled to appear in a Nigerian court to press a claim for £2.3 million damages he had laid 15 months earlier against a newspaper that published allegations of corruption. In August 2009, Adamu stated that problems in Nigerian sports since his redeployment had vindicated him. On 17 October 2010, it was reported in the UK Sunday Times that he allegedly agreed to receive £500,000 in order to influence the voting procedure with his vote for the 2018 FIFA World Cup bid. He denied any wrongdoing. An investigation by FIFA banned him and Reynald Temarii from soccer administration. In November 2010 Adamu received a three-year ban and 10,000 Swiss franc fine from FIFA Ethics Committee after being found guilty of breaching bribery rules.

Dr Cornel Borbély, chairman of the investigatory chamber of the Ethics Committee of FIFA, conducted an investigation against Adamu in December 2016. Adamu was found guilty for violating articles 13 (General rules of conduct), 15 (Loyalty) and 19 (Conflicts of interest) of the FIFA Code of Ethics by receiving money in exchange for World Cup votes.

On 28 February 2017 the FIFA Ethics Committee banned Adamu for two years.
