= Andrew Jennings =

British investigative reporter (1943–2022)

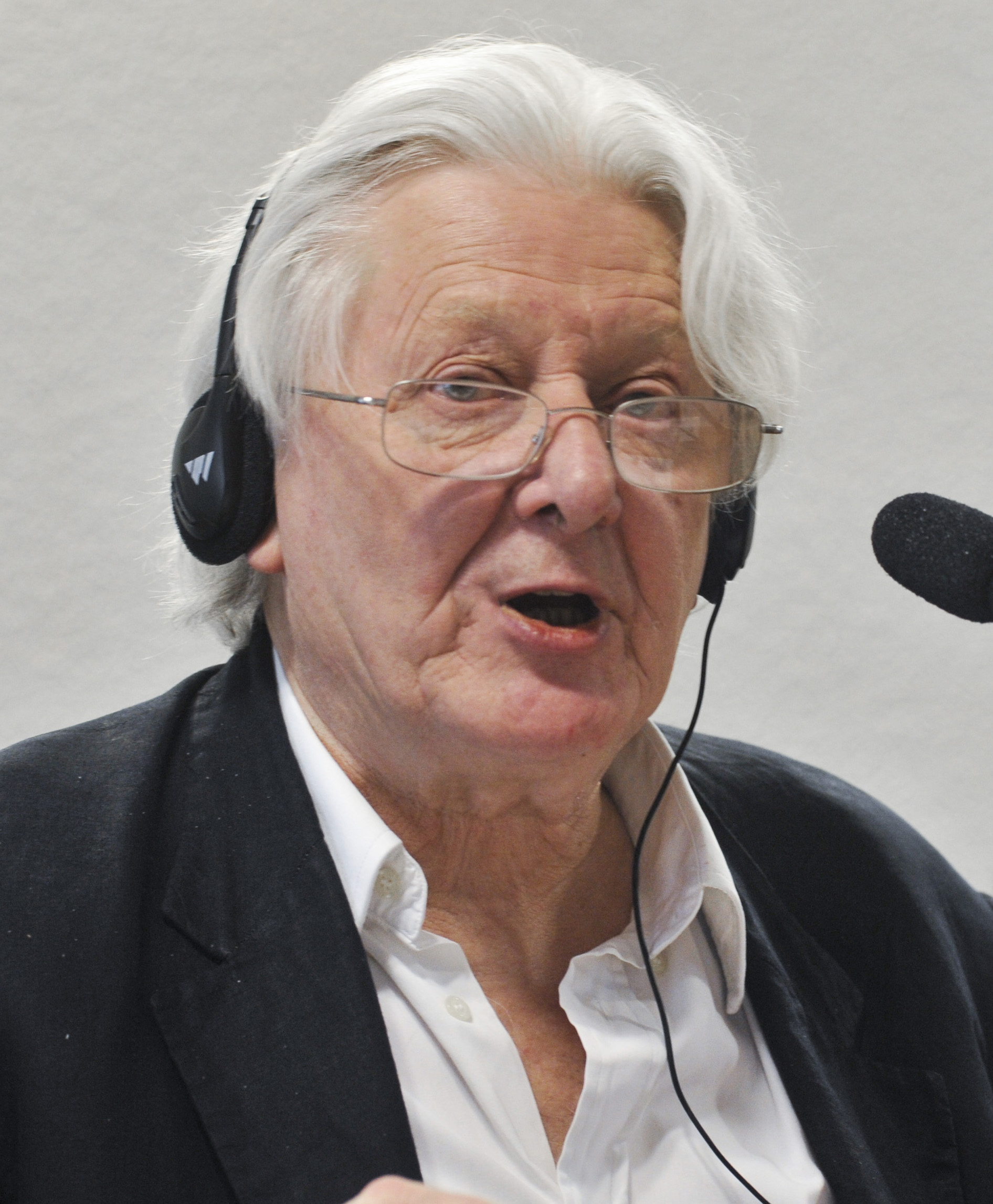
- Born: Edward Arthur Andrew Jennings; 3 September 1943; Kirkcaldy, Scotland
- Died: 8 January 2022 (aged 78); Carlisle, England
- Education: University of Hull
- Occupations: Journalist, author

Edward Arthur Andrew Jennings (3 September 1943 – 8 January 2022) was a British investigative reporter. He was best known for his work investigating and writing about corruption in the IOC and FIFA.

== Early life ==
Edward Arthur Andrew Jennings was born in Kirkcaldy, Scotland on 3 September 1943. His father worked as a school headmaster; his mother was a housewife. He was the grandson of a former Clapton Orient player. His family relocated to London when he was a child. Jennings attended the University of Hull, and first worked at the Burnley Evening Star.

== Career ==
Jennings became part of the Sunday Times' Insight team during the late 1960s. He went on to work as an investigative reporter on BBC Radio Four's Checkpoint, probing into cocaine trafficking and murders carried out by the Sicilian Mafia. In 1986 the BBC refused to broadcast his documentary concerning corruption in Scotland Yard. Jennings consequently resigned and transposed the material into his first book, Scotland Yard's Cocaine Connection. The documentary was aired by World in Action.

Jennings subsequently worked for Granada, filming several international investigations and small documentaries. His investigation of British participation in the Iran–Contra affair won the gold medal at the New York TV Festival in 1989. He entered Chechnya in 1993 with the first western TV crew ever to enter the country, to investigate Caucasus mafia activity. He worked with World in Action in 1997, with an investigation on British Olympic swimming coach Hamilton Bland. One year later, he presented a documentary on rail privatisation.

=== Panorama ===
Jennings's first appearance on Panorama, a current affairs documentary television programme, came in June 2006 (episode entitled "The Beautiful Bung: Corruption and the World Cup"): Jennings investigated several allegations of bribery within FIFA, including million-dollar bribes to secure marketing rights for the body's sports marketing company ISL along with vote-buying (to secure the position of FIFA president Sepp Blatter), bribery and graft attributed to CONCACAF president Jack Warner. It was followed up in October 2007 with an episode entitled "FIFA and Coe" exploring the relationship between former British Olympian Sebastian Coe and the FIFA Ethics Committee.

The most prominent programme was FIFA's Dirty Secrets (first aired on 29 November 2010), which was a 30-minute investigation of corruption allegations against some of the FIFA executive committee members who were to vote on the host for the 2018 FIFA World Cup. Jennings alleged that Ricardo Teixeira, President of Brazil's Football Federation (CBF) and of the 2014 World Cup Organising Committee, Nicolás Léoz of Paraguay, President of the South American Football Confederation (CONMEBOL), and Issa Hayatou from Cameroon, President of the Confederation of African Football (CAF) all accepted bribes from a television marketing firm. In December 2015, he presented a summary of the investigations into FIFA entitled Fifa, Sepp Blatter and Me for BBC's Panorama.

== Personal life ==
Jennings was married to Janeen Weir until her death in 1974. They had one daughter together and two children from Janeen's previous marriage. He was subsequently in a domestic partnership with Clare Sambrook until his death. They had two children together.

Jennings suffered a stroke in 2015 during a visit to New York. He died at Cumberland Infirmary in Carlisle, on 8 January 2022, aged 78, having suffered a ruptured aortic aneurysm.

== Books ==
- Scotland Yard's Cocaine Connection, 1989 ISBN 978-0-224-02521-8
- The Lords of the Rings: Power, Money and Drugs in the Modern Olympics, 1992 ISBN 978-0-671-71122-1
- The New Lords of the Rings, 1996 ISBN 978-0-671-85571-0
- The Great Olympic Swindle, 2000 ISBN 978-0-684-86677-2
- FOUL! The Secret World of FIFA: Bribes, Vote-Rigging and Ticket Scandals, 2006 ISBN 978-0-00-720869-2
- Omertà: Sepp Blatter's FIFA Organised Crime Family, 2014.
- The Dirty Game: Uncovering the Scandal at FIFA, 2015 ISBN 978-1-78089-542-0

== Awards ==
- The Play the Game Award (shared with Jens Weinreich), 2011. In recognition of his "tireless work documenting and bringing mismanagement and corruption in the world's leading sports organisations into public view.
- Royal Television Society Award for his Channel 4 News investigation on Olympic corruption, 2000.
- The first "Integrity in Journalism" award given by OATH, 1999.
- "Best International Documentary", New York TV Festival, 1992
