= Enrique Sanz de Santamaría =

American sports businessman

Enrique Sanz
- Born: Enrique Sanz de Santamaría; 1974 (age 51–52)
- Known for: former General Secretary of CONCACAF

Enrique Sanz de Santamaría (born 1974) is a Colombian-American sports executive. He was appointed as General Secretary of CONCACAF in July 2012.

== Education ==
Sanz de Santamaría has a B.S. degree in Marketing and Advertising from the University of Politécnico Grancolombiano and a master's degree in Sports Event Marketing and Management from New York University in 1999.

== Career ==
He has been closely related to the football world at a personal level since childhood and for the past 15 years at a professional level. Responsible for business development activities in different roles within the CONCACAF region at Traffic Sports USA, a leading soccer marketing company in Latin America, he consolidated and managed relationships with FIFA and CONCACAF representatives and Federations for over a decade.

During his time with Traffic Sports USA, he became part of the team who laid the foundation of NASL (North American Soccer League) in the U.S.

He worked in a team that founded various football clubs (Atlanta Silverbacks, Carolina RailHawks, and Fort Lauderdale Strikers) and was crucial in the development of players in the region.

Prior to his latest position, Sanz de Santamaría was the founder and CEO of Media Sports Marketing, a football marketing agency, and Vice President of Interforever Sports, a premier soccer marketing company in the CONCACAF region. Interforever had sold television rights to competitions such as the Caribbean Cup.

=== Corruption case ===
Enrique Sanz had been one of the protagonists of the largest football bribery case ever discovered in North America. Brazilian José Hawilla, owner and founder of Traffic Group, founded his North American subsidiary in 2003, headed by Aaron Davidson. Davidson hired Enrique Sanz as his deputy. His job was to pay huge bribes to top U.S. decision-makers, so they copied the company’s South American operating model in the U.S. The bribed officials then gave the marketing rights to major sporting events to them. When Enrique Sanz's role in the bribery cases was revealed in 2014 in connection with Hawilla's more than $100 million bribery case, he also began working closely with the FBI to commute his sentence and testify against Davidson, who was arrested on May 6, 2015, as a result.

In wake of the FIFA corruption scandal, the Executive Committee of CONCACAF has placed General Secretary Enrique Sanz on a leave of absence beginning May 28, 2015. He was dismissed from his position in August 2015. Sanz de Santamaria was banned by FIFA Ethics Committee.

== Personal life ==
He lives in Florida today. He is an investor and Chief Experience Officer at eWheels Polo.
