= Lionel Haven =

Bahamian footballer and football executive

Personal information
- Full name: Lionel E. Haven
- Date of birth: December 30, 1965 (age 60)
- Position: Defender

Senior career*
| Years | Team | Apps | (Gls) |
- United FC
- Cavalier

International career
| 1987–2000 | Bahamas | 6 | (0) |
- * Club domestic league appearances and goals

Lionel Haven (born 30 December 1965) is a former football executive and retired association football player from the Bahamas.

== International career ==
Haven played for the Bahamas in Pan-American Games Qualifiers in 1987 against Mexico and in all 4 FIFA World Cup qualification matches in 2000.

== Administration ==
After retiring as a player, Haven was long-time head coach of Cavalier FC and served as executive director and General Secretary of the Bahamas Football Association and also became a member of the executive committee of the Caribbean Football Union in 2001.

=== FIFA Ban ===
In April 2016, Haven was banned for five years by FIFA Ethics Committee from all football-related activities due to non-disclosure of information around payments at a CFU event. The verdict was a fine of $3,000. Haven's ban was due to an alleged cash for votes controversy. It happened at a hotel in Trinidad, where the Caribbean football executives were given $40,000 in envelopes ahead of the 2011 FIFA presidential election. He later denied any wrongdoing.

== Personal life ==
Haven graduated from the University of Charleston, West Virginia in 1989. He then worked as an accountant and is currently CEO at a land title research company.

His older brother Sam also played for the national team and was a president of the BFA. He died in August 2014. Two of his daughters played for the Bahamas Women U-17 team in 2012.
