= Somyot Poompanmoung =

Thai politician (born 1954)

Police General Somyot Poompanmoung สมยศ พุ่มพันธุ์ม่วง
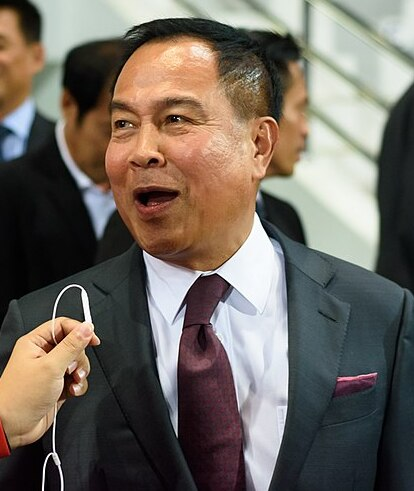

President of Football Association of Thailand
- In office 11 February 2016 – 8 February 2024
- Preceded by: Worawi Makudi
- Succeeded by: Nualphan Lamsam

Commissioner-General of the Royal Thai Police
- In office 1 October 2014 – 30 September 2015
- Preceded by: Adul Sangsingkeo
- Succeeded by: Chakthip Chaijinda

Personal details
- Born: 27 December 1954 (age 71) Ayutthaya, Thailand
- Party: Bhumjaithai Party
- Spouse: Potjaman Poompanmoung
- Education: Armed Forces Academies Preparatory School; Royal Thai Police Cadet Academy
- Profession: Politician; Policeman

Somyot Poompanmoung (Thai: สมยศ พุ่มพันธุ์ม่วง; RTGS: Somyot Phumphanmuang; born 27 December 1954) is a former commissioner-general of the Royal Thai Police and former president of the Football Association of Thailand.

== Career ==
The National Police Policy Committee, on 20 August 2014, promoted Somyot to be the tenth Commissioner-General of the Royal Thai Police, replacing Adul Sangsingkeo who was removed from the office by National Council for Peace and Order on 24 May 2014.

Somyot retired as the Commissioner-General of the Royal Thai Police from 1 October 2015.

== Member of National Legislative Council ==
Following the military coup of 22 May 2014, Somyot was appointed to the National Legislative Council (NLC). Members are required to reveal their assets and properties to determine if they are "unusually rich". Somyot and his wife's net worth was reported to be about 355 million baht (roughly US$11 million). One government critic said that this raised "...questions about how a lifelong career in the public service could have made him a millionaire."

== President of Football Association of Thailand ==
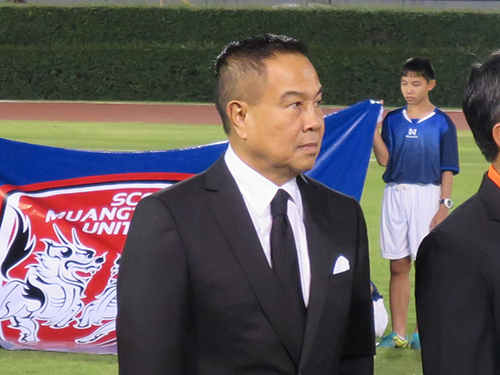
Somyot in 2017 after the game of 2017 Thailand Champions Cup

On 11 February 2016, Somyot was elected the new president of the Football Association of Thailand. On 3 June 2019, he was appointed as Asian Football Confederation Executive Committee Member to represent the ASEAN Football Federation.

On February 8, 2024, Somyot declared his departure from the presidency of the Football Association. Having served in the role since 2016, totaling 8 years, his tenure had reached the limit of two terms. Opting not to vie for reelection for a third term, Somyot made this decision upon learning that Thai politician and businesswoman Nualphan Lamsam would be contesting against him for the presidency of the Football Association.

== Victoria's Secret loan ==
In 2018, Somyot publicly declared that he had borrowed 300 million baht from the fugitive owner of the Victoria's Secret Massage parlour while serving as national police chief in 2014 and 2015. Somyot's admission came after the Department of Special Investigation (DSI) revealed that its Victoria's Secret investigation found that the money trail of the business's owner, Kampol Wirathepsuporn, led to the former police chief. When asked why he borrowed so much money from Mr Kampol, he answered that his police job was a sideline career and he needed the funds for his other businesses, including a stock trading firm. Somyot did not report the loans in his assets declaration submitted to the National Anti-Corruption Commission as required during his term in office.

== Wichian Klanprasert case ==
On 29 August 2024, Somyot was indicted along with seven others for their role in tampering with evidence related to the death of Wichian Klanprasert, particularly in the altering of the recorded speed of the Ferrari used by the suspect, Red Bull heir Vorayuth Yoovidhya.

== Awards ==
- The Most Exalted Order of the White Elephant
- The Most Noble Order of the Crown of Thailand
