= Susan Phillips Read =

American judge

Susan P. Read

Associate Judge of the New York Court of Appeals
- In office 2003 – August 24, 2015
- Appointed by: George Pataki
- Preceded by: Howard A. Levine
- Succeeded by: Michael J. Garcia

Presiding Judge of the New York Court of Claims
- In office 1999–2003
- Appointed by: George Pataki

Judge on the New York Court of Claims
- In office 1998–1999
- Appointed by: George Pataki

Deputy Counsel to Governor George Pataki
- In office 1995–1998

Personal details
- Born: June 27, 1947 (age 79) Gallipolis, Ohio, U.S.
- Education: Ohio Wesleyan University; University of Chicago Law School

Susan Phillips Read (born June 27, 1947) is a former judge on the New York State Court of Appeals, having been appointed by Republican Governor George Pataki in 2003 for a 14-year term. Her selection made the appointed high court the first in the United States to comprise a majority of women. She resigned from the bench effective August 24, 2015.

== Background ==
A native of Gallipolis, Ohio, Read is an alumna of Ohio Wesleyan University and the University of Chicago Law School, having received a Bachelor of Arts degree from the former in 1969 and a J.D. degree from the latter in 1972.

== Legal career ==
Upon graduation, she took a position as a legal intern on the U.S. Atomic Energy Commission. In 1974, she became assistant counsel for the State University of New York, continuing in that capacity until 1977.

In 1995, Read became Deputy Counsel to Governor Pataki. She was appointed by Pataki and confirmed to an unexpired term as a judge of the New York Court of Claims on April 30, 1998, and for a full term on June 2, 1999. In 1999, she was designated as Presiding Judge of the Court of Claims. Her selection for a 14-year term to New York State's Court of Appeals, also by Governor Pataki, was confirmed by the New York State Senate in 2003.

In June 2015, Read tendered her resignation from the Court of Appeals, effective on August 24, 2015.

In March 2016, it was announced that Read joined the law firm Greenberg Traurig as of counsel.

Legal offices
Preceded by Howard A. Levine	Associate Judge of the New York Court of Appeals; 2003–2015	Succeeded by Michael J. Garcia
