= Howard A. Levine =

American judge (born 1932)

The Honorable Howard A. Levine

Associate Judge of the New York Court of Appeals
- In office September 8, 1993 – December 31, 2002
- Appointed by: Mario Cuomo
- Succeeded by: Susan Phillips Read

Justice of the New York Supreme Court, Appellate Division, Third Department
- In office 1982 – September 1993

Justice of the New York Supreme Court
- In office 1981–1982

Judge of the Schenectady County Family Court
- In office 1971–1980

District Attorney of Schenectady County
- In office 1967–1970

Personal details
- Born: March 4, 1932 (age 94) Troy, New York, U.S.
- Spouse: Barbara Joan Segall
- Children: 3
- Education: Yale University (BA, LLB)
- Occupation: Lawyer, jurist

Howard Arnold Levine (born March 4, 1932) is an American lawyer and jurist who served as an associate judge of the New York Court of Appeals, the state's highest court, from 1993 to 2002. Earlier in his career, he was district attorney of Schenectady County, a judge of the Schenectady County Family Court, a justice of the New York Supreme Court, and an associate justice of the Appellate Division, Third Department.

== Early life and education ==
Levine was born in Troy, New York and grew up in Schenectady, New York. His parents were lawyers. He was educated at Nott Terrace High School. Later, he earned a B.A. from Yale University in 1953, and an LL.B. from Yale Law School in 1956.

== Legal career ==
After graduating from law school, Levine held a postgraduate research and teaching appointment before joining the New York City law firm of Hughes, Hubbard, Blair and Reed. He later returned to Schenectady and entered private practice. From 1961 to 1966, he served as an assistant district attorney in Schenectady County, and in 1966 he was elected district attorney, serving until 1970.

In 1970, Levine was elected to the Schenectady County Family Court, where he served from 1971 to 1980. During and after his Family Court service, he was active in juvenile justice and child welfare issues, serving on bodies including the New York State Temporary Commission on Child Welfare and the Temporary Commission on the Recodification of the Family Court Act. In 1981, he was elected a justice of the New York Supreme Court for the Fourth Judicial District, and in 1982 he was named an associate justice of the Appellate Division, Third Department. While serving on the Third Department, Levine authored more than 950 majority or dissenting opinions.

In 1993, Governor Mario Cuomo appointed Levine to the New York Court of Appeals, and he was sworn in on September 8 of that year. He served until mandatory retirement at the end of 2002 and was succeeded by Susan Phillips Read. Among his notable opinions on the Court of Appeals was Matter of David Griffin (1996), in which he wrote for the court that a prison policy requiring attendance at Alcoholics Anonymous and conditioning visitation benefits on attendance violated the Establishment Clause.

== Academic career ==
After retiring from the Court of Appeals, Levine became the first Justice Robert H. Jackson Distinguished Professor at Albany Law School and also served as a jurist-in-residence at Siena College. He later joined the Albany law firm Whiteman Osterman & Hanna as senior counsel.

== Recognition ==
In 1986, the New York State Bar Association created an award named after him, called the Howard A. Levine Award for Excellence in Juvenile Justice and Child Welfare.

Political offices
Preceded by Stewart F. Hancock Jr.	Judge of the New York Court of Appeals; 1993–2002	Succeeded by Susan Phillips Read
