= Nualphan Lamsam =

Thai politician and businesswoman

Nualphan Lamsam นวลพรรณ ล่ำซำ
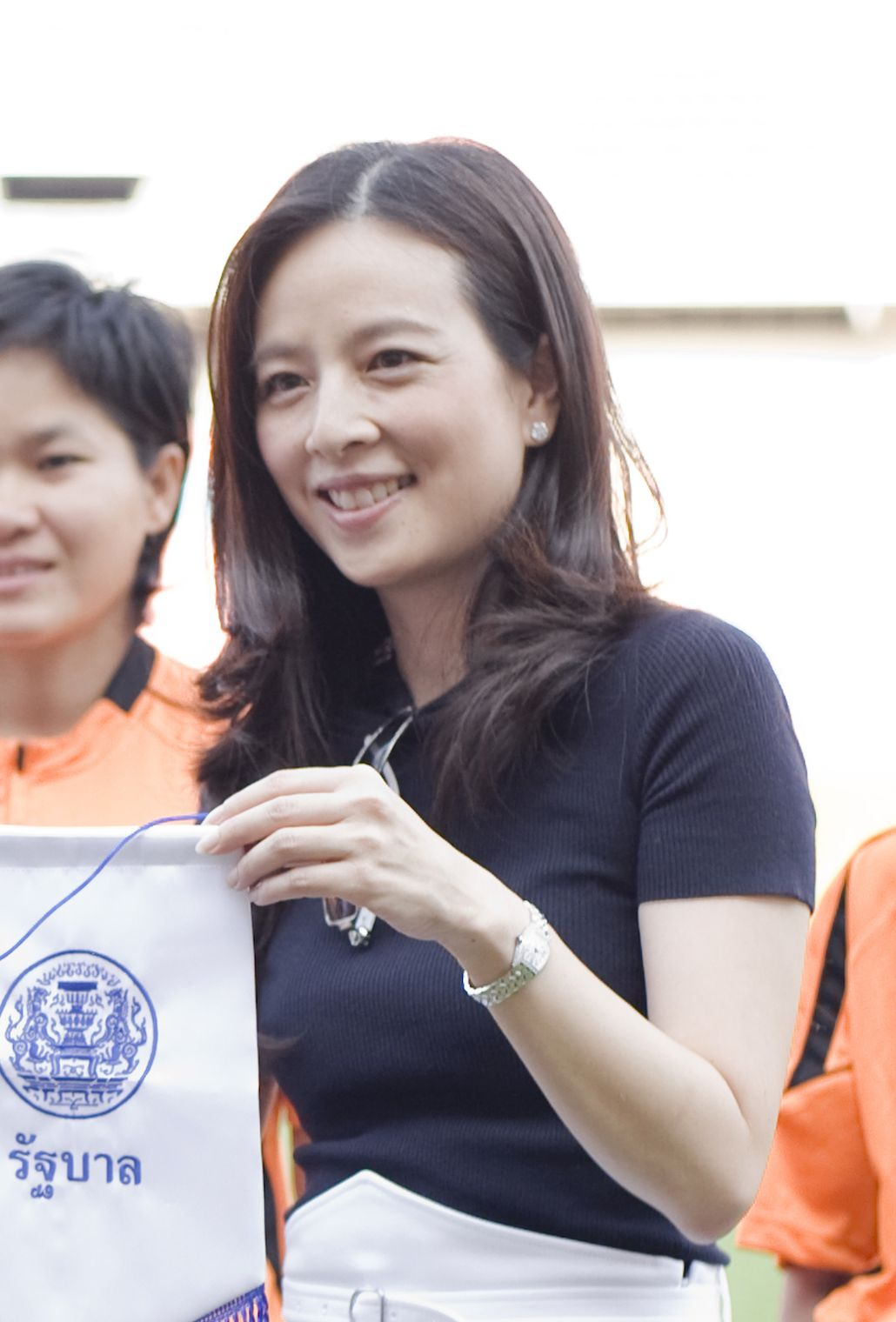
- Nualphan in 2010

President of Football Association of Thailand
- Incumbent
- Assumed office 8 February 2024
- Preceded by: Somyot Poompanmoung

Personal details
- Born: 21 March 1966 (age 60) Bangkok, Thailand
- Party: Democrat Party
- Spouse(s): Vachara Phanchet (div. 2005); Narat Sawettanan (m. 2014)
- Children: Nuanwan Phanchet
- Education: M.A. Boston University; B.Acc. Chulalongkorn University
- Profession: Politician; Businesswoman
- Nickname: Madame Pang

Nualphan Lamsam (Thai: นวลพรรณ ล่ำซำ; RTGS: Nuanphan Lamsam; Chinese: 伍倫盼; born 21 March 1966), nicknamed Madame Pang (Thai: มาดามแป้ง), is the president and chief executive officer of Muang Thai Insurance, and the current (and first female) president of the Football Association of Thailand. This also makes her the first female president in the Asian Football Confederation.

She is a member of the Democrat Party and was its assistant secretary-general from 2006 to 2016.

== Early life and education ==
Nualphan is the fifth generation descendant of the Lamsam family. She is the daughter of Photipong Lamsam, a politician of the Democrat Party and Yupa Lamsam, a major shareholder of Muang Thai Insurance public company limited, the company which she currently owns.

She has a sister, Wannaporn Phornprapa, the managing director of P Landscape Company, and a brother, Sara Lamsam, the president and CEO of Mueang Thai Life Insurance.

Nualphan graduated from Patumwan Demonstration School, Srinakharinwirot University, with a Bachelor of Marketing from the Faculty of Commerce and Accountancy at Chulalongkorn University, and with a Master of Management from Boston University.

== Career ==
In 2024 she was elected as the first female president of the Football Association of Thailand. This also made her the first female president in the Asian Football Confederation.

She is also the president and chief executive officer of Muang Thai Insurance.

== Marriage ==
Nualphan's first marriage was with Vachara Phanchet, Chairman of Sittipol Sales co. and German Auto co. They had one daughter, Nuanwan Phanchet, born in 1997. Nualphan and Vachara divorced in early 2005 and she later married Corrections Department director-general, Police Colonel Narat Sawettanan on 19 January 2014.
