= Jim Boyce (football administrator) =

Association Football administrator from Northern Ireland

Jim Boyce OBE
- Born: March 21, 1944 (age 82); Belfast, Northern Ireland

James Richard Wesley Boyce OBE (born 21 March 1944) is a former senior Vice-President of FIFA. He was the president of Northern Ireland's football organising body, the IFA, from 1995 to 2007.

Boyce is a lifelong supporter of Cliftonville F.C.; as a young lad of seven, he acted as a ballboy. He was club vice chairman from 1977 to 1988 and then chairman until 1998. He is currently Cliftonville's patron.

Boyce was one of a number of FIFA officials to call for the publication of the Garcia Report into allegations of corruption surrounding Russia and Qatar's bids for the 2018 and 2022 FIFA World Cups.

He described the failure not to build a national stadium at the former Maze Prison "a massive mistake".

Boyce played for Ballymena Cricket Club during the 1970s. He was team captain between 1974 and 1978.

He was seriously injured by a bomb planted by republicans in the early 1970s and was off work for a year not long after his marriage to Hazel.

A senior figure in insurance, he was appointed Officer of the Order of the British Empire (OBE) in the 2015 New Year Honours for services to football in Northern Ireland.
