= María Claudia Rojas =

Colombian jurist

- Born: Cali, Colombia
- Occupation: Jurist
- Title: Chairman of the Investigatory Chamber of the FIFA Ethics Committee
- Term: 2017-
- Predecessor: Cornel Borbély

María Claudia Rojas Lasso is a Colombian jurist who serves as chairman of the Investigative Chamber of the FIFA Ethics Committee since 11 May 2017. From January 2014 to March 2015, she was the judge of the country's highest administrative court as President of the Council of State of Colombia. She is a specialist in bioethics and an expert in analysis and conflict resolution and graduated in international tax law.

== Career ==
Rojas completed her law studies at the University of San Buenaventura (USB) in Cali in 1978 and specialized in conflict analysis and its resolution at the Nueva Granada Military University in 1996 and in international tax law at the Universidad Externado de Colombia in 2008.

Rojas has 25 years of professional experience in the judiciary in her country. As a lawyer, she gained extensive expertise as a litigator, was head of the legal department of the Instituto de Seguros Sociales (ISS) in Cali, head of the administration of the Corporación Autonoma Regional del Valle del Cauca and judicial director at Procomún. Rojas was head of the administration of the Regional Autonomous Society of the Valle del Cauca Department and was an assessor in the State Council in Bogotá for seven years until 2001 before she became its president. Rojas taught constitutional law at the USB in Cali and declared herself a "great defender of the environment". Her professional endeavors are aimed at restoring the confidence of the Colombian people in the country's judiciary.

== Other work ==
Rojas wrote several books, including "Protection against judicial decisions in the case law of the constitutional court" (La tutela contra providencias judiciales en la jurisprudencia de la Corte Constitucional), "Constitutional control in Colombia" (Control Constitucional en Colombia) and "Legal effects of transsexualism" (Implicaciones Jurídicas del Transexualismo ). She won first prize in a national competition organized by the Asociación Nacional de Instituciones Financieras (ANIF) with the thesis "The Review of the Constitution in Colombia" (Del control constitucional en Colombia).

On 11 May 2017, Rojas was elected as Chairman of the Investigative Chamber of the FIFA Ethics Committee at the FIFA Congress in Manama, Bahrain succeeding Cornel Borbély as Chief Investigator.
