= Cornel Borbély =

Swiss lawyer

- Born: 1978 (age 47–48); Dürnten
- Education: University of Zurich and University of Lucerne
- Occupation: Lawyer
- Years active: 2006–present
- Title: Chairman of the Investigatory Chamber of the FIFA Ethics Committee
- Term: 2014–2017
- Predecessor: Michael J. Garcia
- Successor: María Claudia Rojas

Cornel Borbély (born 1978) is a Swiss jurist. He is a lawyer in Zurich and was from 2014 until 2017 the second chairman of the investigatory chamber of the FIFA Ethics Committee.

== Life and education ==
Borbély was born in 1978 in Dürnten. After graduating from high school he worked for a major bank from 1997 to 2000 and studied jurisprudence at the same time at the University of Zurich. Borbély graduated in 2003 and received his doctorate in 2005, also from the University of Zurich. At the University of Lucerne, he received a degree in forensics in 2007 and a Masters in Economic Crime Investigation in 2011.

== Professional career ==
Borbély was approved as lawyer, in the Canton of Zurich in 2006 and in the same year became Law Clerk to the prosecutor of the Canton. In 2007, he was appointed to prosecutor in charge of general criminal matters. In 2008, Borbély moved to the department for economic crime and was group leader there as of 2011. After retiring in 2014, Borbély worked as an attorney at a law firm in Zurich. In 2015, he opened his own law firm for criminal and commercial law in Zurich.

== FIFA Ethics Committee ==
Borbély was appointed deputy chairman of the Investigatory Chamber of the FIFA Ethics Committee in May 2013. Together with Michael J. Garcia, the chairman of the investigation chamber, he examined the allegations of corruption in connection with the awarding of the Football World Cup 2018 and 2022 to Russia and Qatar. In order to avoid conflicts of interest for the US American Garcia, Borbély was given the main responsibility for the investigation of the 2018 FIFA World Cup in October 2013. The investigation report was submitted to the Judicial Chamber of the FIFA Ethics Committee in September 2014. After the resignation of Garcia as chairman of the investigation chamber, FIFA determined that Borbély was to be his successor. The FIFA Congress in May 2015 confirmed him as chairman. Together with Hans-Joachim Eckert, chairman of the adjudicatory chamber, Borbély had made a significant commitment to fight against a confidentiality clause in ongoing proceedings of the FIFA Ethics Committee and for more transparency and the right to information. In October 2015, the FIFA Executive Committee approved new rules for the disclosure of investigative information.

Borbély was responsible for the investigation of high FIFA officials, like Jerome Valcke, Jeffrey Webb, Franz Beckenbauer, Eugenio Figueredo, Nicolás Leoz, Ángel María Villar, Jack Warner, Chung Mong-joon, Wolfgang Niersbach and Theo Zwanziger. He was not responsible for the investigations against former FIFA President, Sepp Blatter, since Blatter is also Swiss. Borbély was represented in this case by Robert Torres from Guam. Because the investigations against Blatter also concerned UEFA President Michel Platini, responsibility for the investigation against Platini was transferred to Vanessa Allard from Trinidad and Tobago.

In May 2017, he was already invited to the relevant FIFA Congress in Bahrain and, without giving reasons or in contrary to statements by Secretary-General Fatma Samoura, was informed during the arrival flight that he would not be nominated for re-election. Borbély evaluated this as a dusting on the hundreds of other cases that were pilling up on his desk, and commented, "The Code of Ethics [of FIFA] is now a dead piece of paper." He was succeeded by the Colombian Maria Claudia Rojas.

== Sports Governance Unit ==
Together with Hans-Joachim Eckert, the former chairman of the Judicial Chamber of the FIFA Ethics Committee, and Marc Tenbücken, a communications expert, Borbély founded the Sports Governance Unit in November 2017, which advises sports associations, clubs and sponsors on good governance.

== Other activities ==
Borbély is deputy chief of military justice of the Swiss Air Force and lecturer in economic criminal law.

== Publications ==
- Die Kostentragung in Einstellungsverfügungen
- Der Grundsatz der geheimen Abstimmung
- Unternehmen im Fokus von Straftätern
- Datendiebstahl in einem KMU: Strafrechtliche Aspekte
