= Football Association of Thailand =

Governing body

AFC
- Coat of arms and commercial typeface
- Full name: The Football Association of Thailand under the Patronage of His Majesty the King
- Short name: FA Thailand (FAT)
- Founded: 1916; 110 years ago
- Headquarters: Bang Kapi, Bangkok
- FIFA affiliation: 1925
- AFC affiliation: 1954
- AFF affiliation: 1984
- President: Nualphan Lamsam
- General Secretary: Ekapol Polnavee
- Website: fathailand.org

The Football Association of Thailand under the Patronage of His Majesty the King (Thai: สมาคมกีฬาฟุตบอลแห่งประเทศไทย ในพระบรมราชูปถัมภ์), or FA Thailand (FAT; สมาคมกีฬาฟุตบอลแห่งประเทศไทย) for short, is the governing body of association football, futsal and beach soccer in Thailand. It was founded on 25 April 1916. The association joined FIFA on 23 June 1925 and the AFC in 1954.

== History ==
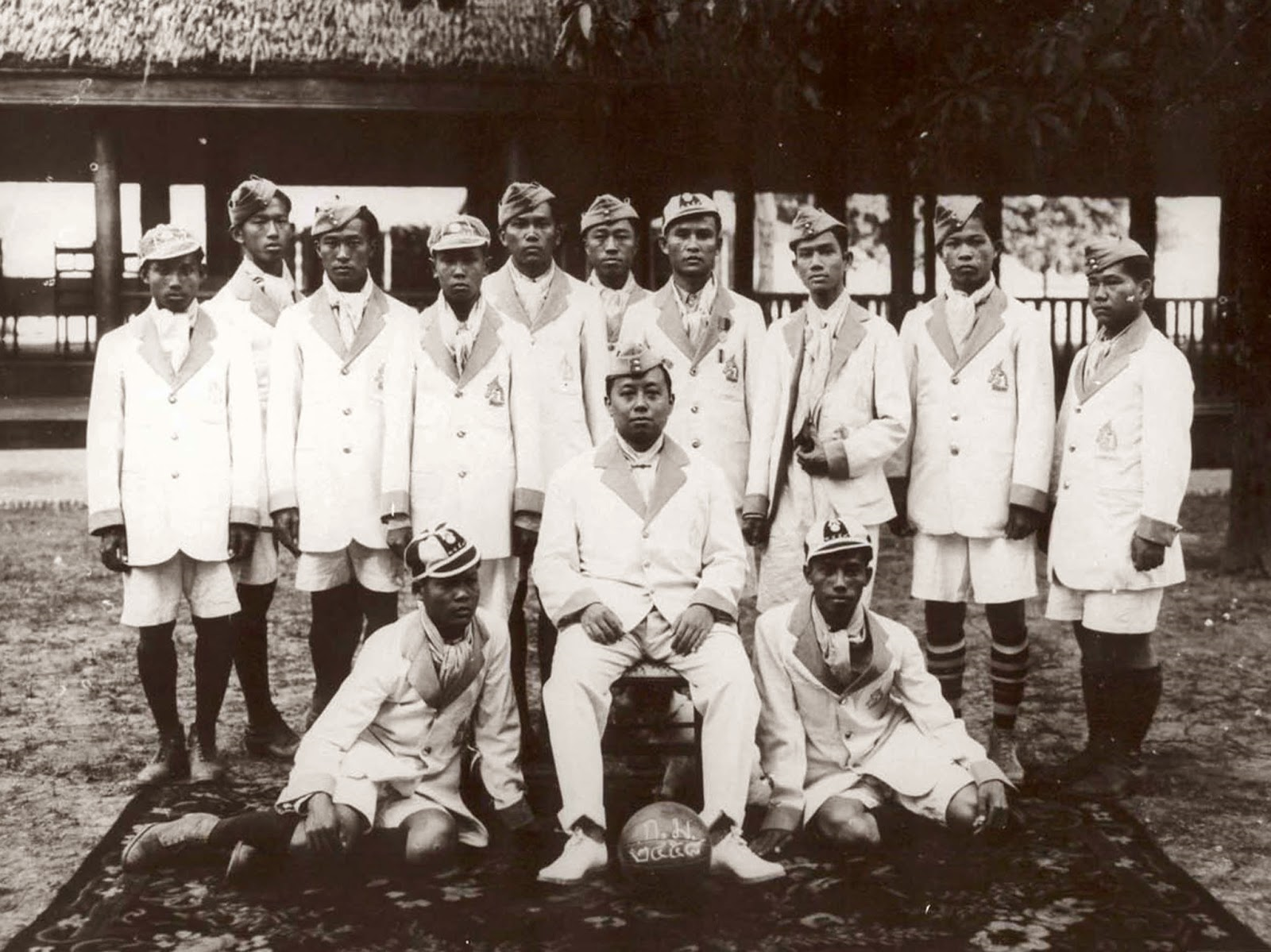
King Vajiravudh, the founder of the Football Association of Thailand

In 1916, King Vajiravudh founded "The Football Association of Thailand under Patronage of His Majesty the King" after that the association joined the FIFA in 1925 and AFC in 1954.

Thailand national football team joined Olympic Games first time in Australia in 1956.

The first football stadium, Supachalasai Stadium, was built in 1935. King's Cup, the first football cup was introduced in 1968. And then two years later, Queen's Cup, a national cup competition, started in 1970.

In 2024 Nualphan Lamsam was elected as the first female president of the Football Association of Thailand, which also made her the first female president in the Asian Football Confederation.

== Thai football competitions ==
=== Leagues and tournaments ===
League competitions in Thailand include :

- Thai League 1
- Thai League 2
- Thai League 3
- Thailand Semi-Pro League
- Thailand Amateur League

(See also: Thai football league system for the additional detail about league system.)

=== Cup competitions ===
- Thai FA Cup – an annual match of football clubs in Thailand.
- Thai League Cup – an annual match of football clubs in Thailand.
- Thailand Champions Cup – an annual match between the champions of Thai League 1 and the champions of Thai FA Cup or runners-up of the Thai League 1.
- King's Cup – an annual international football competition for national teams.
- Queen's Cup – an annual national football cup competition.

== List of FA Thailand Presidents ==
The following is a list of presidents of Football Association of Thailand (FA Thailand).

Presidency	President	Took office	Left office
1	Fuang Puengboon	1916	1919
2	Chatwarid Kasemsan	1919	1922
3	Anura Kanejohn	1922	1925
4	Fuen Puengboon	1925	1928
5	Chalern Chenakool	1928	1931
6	Tetsuthorn Kanjanasap	1931	1934
7	Samakhom Kittiyakorn	1934	1938
8	Jiam Jiarakool	1953	1955
9	Pachern Nimitbutr	1955	1956
10	Jampen Jarusatian	1960	1961
11	Torsak Yommanart	1961	1973
12	Anu Romyanont	1975	1976
13	Prachoom Rattanapian	1976	1977
	Anu Romyanont	1978	1988
14	Chalor Kerdthes	1988	1995
15	Vijit Ketkaew	1995	2007
16	Worawi Makudi	2007	2015
17	Somyot Poompanmoung	2016	2024
18	Nualphan Lamsam	2024	Incumbent

== Executive committee ==
Term of office: 2024–2028

Name	Position
Nualphan Lamsam	President
Wilak Lothong; Adisak Benjasiriwan; Charnwit Polcheewin; Annop Singtothong; Yuttana Yimgarund	Vice President
Kritsaya Phumongkolsuriya; Napassanan Pannipa; Samran Nualma; Lertsak Pattanachaikul; Piyapong Pue-on; Pornthep Mamanee; Anurut Nakasai; Pimchaya Sasomsub; Chaitad Chaijinda; Ravida Sosothikul; Kritsada Jinavijarana; Winai Thongsong; Adisak Phancharoenworakul	Committee

== See also ==
- Football in Thailand
- Football records in Thailand
- Thailand national football team
- Thailand women's national football team
- Thailand national futsal team
- Thailand women's national futsal team
- Thailand national beach soccer team
- Thai League 1
