= Lev L. Dassin =

American lawyer (born 1965)

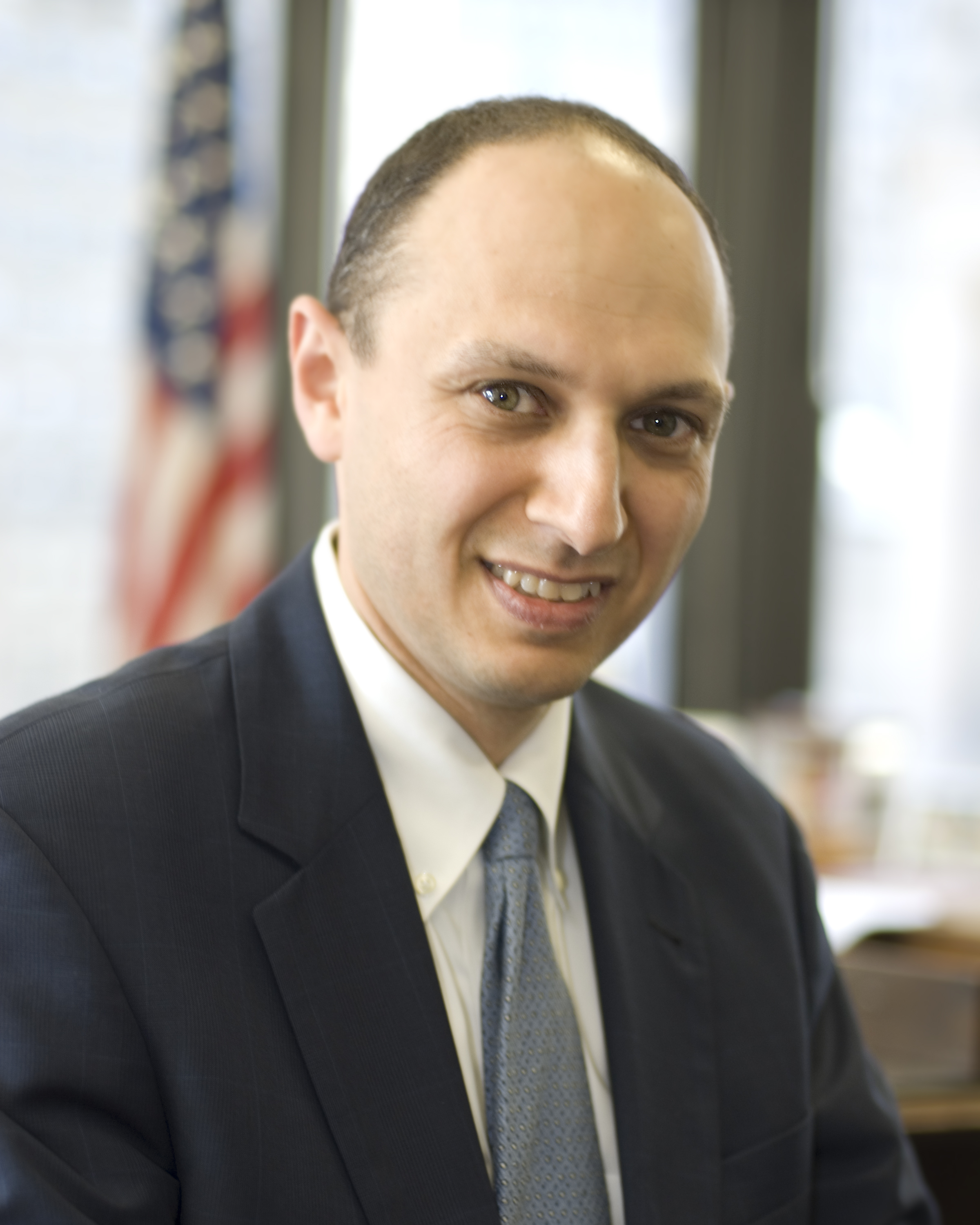

United States Attorney for the Southern District of New York Acting
- In office December 1, 2008 – August 13, 2009
- President: George W. Bush; Barack Obama
- Preceded by: Michael J. Garcia
- Succeeded by: Preet Bharara

Personal details
- Born: September 10, 1965 (age 61)
- Education: Cornell University (BA); New York University (JD)

Lev L. Dassin (born 10 September 1965) was the acting US Attorney for the Southern District of New York serving in the position from December 2008 until August 2009.

== Sources ==
- Cleary Gottlieb Steen and Hamilton bio
