= Worawi Makudi =

Thai football president (born 1951)

- วรวีร์ มะกูดี
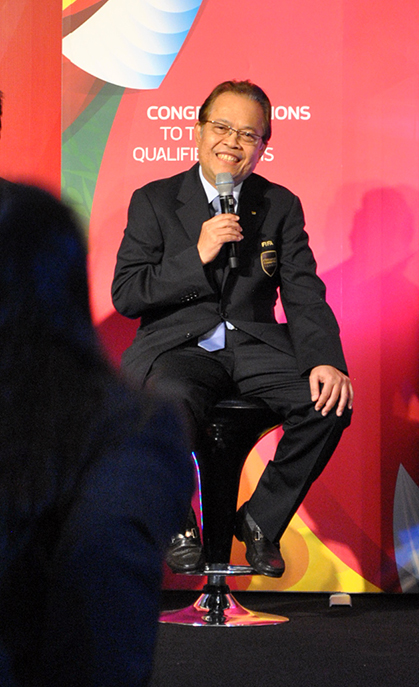
- Worawi Makudi in 2015

President of Football Association of Thailand
- In office 2007 – 12 October 2015
- Preceded by: Vijit Ketkaew
- Succeeded by: Somyot Poompanmoung

Personal details
- Born: 29 November 1951 (age 74) Bangkok, Thailand
- Party: Prachachat Party
- Other political affiliations: Pheu Thai Party (until 2018)
- Education: Kuwait University
- Profession: Politician

Worawi Makudi (Thai: วรวีร์ มะกูดี) (born 29 November 1951), also referred in the media as Bung Yee (Thai: บังยี, RTGS: Bang Yi) is a Thai former football official. He was a member of the FIFA Council from 1997 to 2015. He served as the Football Association of Thailand's General Secretary from 1996 to 2007, before being elected president in 2007.

== Early life and career ==
Makudi is a member of the Thai Muslim minority. He attended Amnuay Silpa School, where he became interested in football and was recruited into the school team. He studied at the Kuwait University, financed by the government of Kuwait, and was selected to join the university's football team.

Makudi served as the Football Association of Thailand Secretary-General from 1996 to 2007, before being elected president in 2007. He was a member of FIFA Executive Committee from 1997 to 2015.

In 2021, Makudi became chairman of Thai League club Nakhon Ratchasima.

== Corruption allegations ==
In May 2011, Lord Triesman gave evidence in the British Parliament that Makudi had demanded the TV rights to a friendly between England and the Thai national team in return for voting for England to host the 2018 FIFA World Cup. This led to an inquiry set up by the Football Association, where Triesman repeated the allegation of corruption by referring to his parliamentary evidence. Makudi then tried to sue Triesman for libel, claiming that the allegations were not true and that his reputation had been tarnished. However the case was dismissed on the grounds of abuse of process, which was confirmed by a higher court.

== Ban and overturn ==
In October 2015 Makudi was suspended by FIFA Ethics Committee from all football activities for 90 days. In February 2016 he was banned by FIFA Disciplinary Committee for three months after it was found that he had breached the previous ban. In October 2016 Makudi was banned by FIFA Ethics Committee for five years and fined 10,000 Swiss Francs for forgery and falsification.

Makudi successfully appealed the ban in 2018 and was overturned in 2019.
