= Colombian withdrawal from hosting the 1986 FIFA World Cup =

Provisional logo for the 1986 FIFA World Cup in Colombia

The 1986 FIFA World Cup was scheduled to take place in Colombia, between May 31 and June 29, 1986, after being selected as the venue in 1974. However, in November 1982 Colombia declined due to the impossibility of complying with the requirements that FIFA demanded to celebrate the event, marking an unprecedented and unrepeated event in the history of the World Cups.

The FIFA Executive Committee, after a meeting in Stockholm, Sweden on May 20, 1983, decided to replace Colombia with Mexico, who became the first country to hold a World Cup twice, after 1970.

== Background ==
In 1973, the Colombian Football Federation had submitted its candidacy to FIFA to organize the 1986 World Cup. The country received the commission of the governing body of world football/soccer that year, and the friendship between Alfonso Senior Quevedo (Colombian sports dirigent) and Sir Stanley Rous (president of FIFA) helped to achieve the venue.

On June 9, 1974, FIFA designated Colombia as the venue for the 1986 FIFA World Cup. However, with the passing of time, due to the few progress in the works of the stadia and the ever bigger requirements of FIFA Executive Committee, the possibility that the country could really host the event was diluted.

At the time the tournament was awarded to Colombia, the FIFA World Cup was contested by 16 teams, but FIFA decided to expand the finals to 24 teams from the 1982 edition on the eve of the 1978 FIFA World Cup, which practically ended the chances of the Colombian government to host the event.

In 1970, during the National Games (the Colombian multi-sport event), Alfonso Senior obtained the support of then President Carlos Lleras Restrepo to launch the candidacy for the World Cup.

In 1974, Colombian president Misael Pastrana Borrero congratulated Alfonso Senior for the designation of Colombia to celebrate the tournament:

Actually, I am highly satisfied. I believe that what I have stated so many times is fulfilled once again, and that is that when the country sets goals and commits itself, it achieves them. I want to congratulate Alfonso Senior and all those who put their dynamic action to achieve this purpose. And of course the country's recognition of the Committee, which so unanimously designated it for an event that unquestionably has a special significance within sporting events.

— Misael Pastrana

In the final of the 1982 FIFA World Cup in Spain, a banner read "Nos vemos en el Mundial Colombia 86" (See you at the World Cup Colombia 86). The back cover of the Colombian edition of the Panini sticker album of the same World Cup had the announcement "Apoyamos el Mundial Colombia 86" (We support the World Cup Colombia 86). In 1982 the Colombia-86 Corporation was created, created by private parties such as the Grancolombiano Group and Bavaria (which would withdraw) to finance the World Cup.

== FIFA requirements ==
- 12 stadiums with a minimum capacity of 40,000 people for the first phase.
- 4 stadiums with a minimum capacity of 60,000 people for the second phase.
- 2 stadiums with a minimum capacity of 80,000 people for the opening match and the final.
- The installation of a communication tower in Bogotá.
- Freezing of hotel rates in national currency for FIFA members as of January 1, 1986.
- The issuance of a decree that would legalize the free circulation of international currency in the country.
- A robust fleet of limousines available to the FIFA executives.
- A railway network between the host cities.
- Airports with the capacity to land jet planes at all venues.
- A network of roads that would allow the easy movement of the fans.

== Proposed venues ==
A total of 5 stadiums in the same number of cities were presented by Colombia for the World Cup. All the stadia were going to be repaired and one was going to be completely new. These stadiums were:

- Nemesio Camacho "El Campín" Stadium in Bogotá
- Pascual Guerrero Stadium in Cali
- Metropolitan Stadium Roberto Meléndez in Barranquilla (new stadium)
- Atanasio Girardot Stadium in Medellín
- Alfonso López Stadium in Bucaramanga

== Withdrawal of hosting duties ==
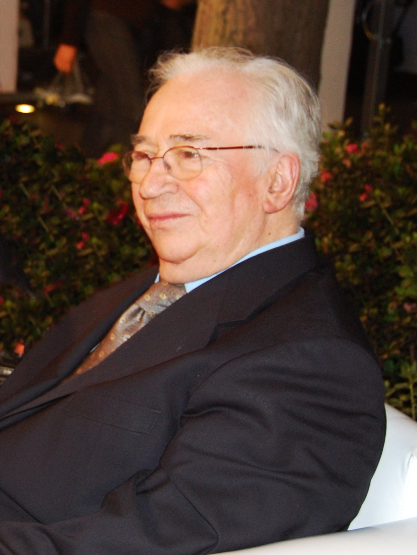
Belisario Betancur, president of Colombia between 1982 and 1986

The Colombian government considered these requirements as excessive and impossible to meet. Therefore, on October 25, 1982, the president of Colombia Belisario Betancur announced the cancellation of the organization of the event. Colombia's resignation from hosting the 1986 World Cup was confirmed by FIFA on November 5, 1982.

As we preserve the public good, as we know that waste is inexcusable, I announce to my compatriots that the 1986 World Cup will not be held in Colombia. After democratic consultation on what our real needs are, the golden rule that the World Cup should serve Colombia and not Colombia the World Cup multinational was not complied with. Here we have many other things to do and there is not even time to attend to the extravagances of FIFA and its partners.

— Belisario Betancur

For the election of the new venue there were 4 candidate countries: Canada, Brazil, United States and Mexico, although Brazil withdrew shortly before the designation while the United States, which did not have much support, preferred to organize a better candidacy for the 1994 FIFA World Cup (from which the country was elected). Both countries inclined their support to the Mexican candidacy. Finally, on May 20, 1983, FIFA unanimously designated Mexico, which had already hosted the 1970 FIFA World Cup and thus maintained the tactic of rotating venues between Europe and Latin America.

== Consequences and legacy ==
Despite Colombia's withdrawal being justified on the grounds that FIFA's infrastructure demands were impossible to meet, Mexico — the country that replaced it as host — did not fulfill the equivalent stadium-capacity requirements either. Mexico's own bid document listed fourteen stadiums, of which only six exceeded 40,000-seat capacity and only three exceeded 60,000 at the time of submission, falling short of the twelve stadiums of 40,000-plus and four stadiums of 60,000-plus that FIFA had specified. In the tournament as ultimately played, only five of the twelve venues used exceeded 40,000 seats, only three exceeded 60,000, and only one — the Estadio Azteca — exceeded 80,000. By contrast, the rival bid submitted by the United States contained more stadiums meeting the required capacities than Mexico's did, and Canadian organizers stated their proposal was more complete than Mexico's; nevertheless, FIFA's special evaluating committee announced on 31 March 1983 that it would consider only Mexico's bid, declining to inspect the Canadian or American venues. FIFA President João Havelange later acknowledged that the American and Canadian presentations had been superior. Critics of the decision noted that Mexico held two seats on FIFA's twenty-two-member executive committee — one held by a FIFA vice president, the other by an executive of the broadcaster Televisa — and that Havelange had privately assured Televisa the broadcast rights ahead of the vote. No documented evidence indicates that Mexico was held to, or satisfied, several of the other conditions FIFA had demanded of Colombia, including construction of a communications tower, a railway network linking host cities, or a dedicated fleet of limousines for FIFA officials.

Alfonso Senior Quevedo was one of the first to regret President Betancur's decision, before resigning from the presidency of the Colombian Football Federation (FCF).

Colombia is a dwarf country that doesn't like big things. And the company of holding the World Cup is a big commitment. I wanted something of that size for Colombia, and Colombia failed me.

— Alfonso Senior Quevedo

Colombia did not organize an important national team tournament until the 2001 Copa América, an event that the Canadian national team declined to attend, due to logistical problems for their players. The Argentinian national team did not attend too, due to an alleged risk to their safety.

The country applied again to organize the 2014 FIFA World Cup, which was announced by the then President Álvaro Uribe, at the opening of the Central American and Caribbean Games held in Cartagena, on July 15, 2006. On April 11, 2007, the president of the FCF Luis Bedoya announced that he would confirm Colombia's resignation to host the tournament, leaving Brazil as the only candidate, and subsequently chosen as the venue for the tournament. However, on May 26, 2008, Colombia was designated as the venue for the 2011 U-20 FIFA World Cup, the first FIFA tournament hosted in Colombia.

Later, in August 2016, Colombia announced its intention to host the 2023 Women's World Cup, but on June 25, 2020, FIFA President Gianni Infantino announced Australia and New Zealand as hosts of the tournament, defeating the Colombia's candidacy by a vote of 22–13 in the first and only round of votes.

This is not the only time that Colombia has lost the venue for an international sporting event, since on May 20, 2021, Conmebol decided to take away the venue for the 2021 Copa América due to public order problems as a result of protests in the country.

== See also ==
- Other withdrawals by originally selected hosts of sports events:
  - 1972 Denver Winter Olympics referendum
  - Victoria bid for the 2026 Commonwealth Games § Cancellation
- Category:International association football competitions hosted by Colombia
