= Michael J. Garcia =

American attorney (born 1961)

Michael Garcia
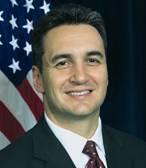

Associate Judge of the New York Court of Appeals
- Incumbent
- Assumed office February 8, 2016
- Appointed by: Andrew Cuomo
- Preceded by: Susan Phillips Read

United States Attorney for the Southern District of New York
- In office September 6, 2005 – December 1, 2008
- President: George W. Bush
- Preceded by: David N. Kelley (acting)
- Succeeded by: Lev L. Dassin (acting)

Assistant Secretary for U.S. Immigrations and Customs Enforcement
- In office March 11, 2003 – September 5, 2005
- President: George W. Bush
- Preceded by: Position established
- Succeeded by: John Clark (acting)

Commissioner of the Immigration and Naturalization Service
- Acting
- In office November 30, 2002 – March 1, 2003
- President: George W. Bush
- Preceded by: James Ziglar
- Succeeded by: Position abolished

Personal details
- Born: Michael John Garcia; October 8, 1961 (age 65) New York City, New York, U.S.
- Party: Republican
- Education: Binghamton University (BA); College of William and Mary (MA); Albany Law School (JD)

Michael John Garcia (born October 3, 1961) is an American attorney and former government official. Since February 2016, he has served as an Associate Judge of the New York Court of Appeals, that state's highest court. He is a former U.S. Attorney for the Southern District of New York (2005–2008). Between his service as United States Attorney and his appointment to the Court of Appeals, Garcia was a partner at the law firm Kirkland & Ellis. He has also served as chairman of El Museo del Barrio.

Garcia previously served as Assistant Secretary for U.S. Immigration and Customs Enforcement (2003–2005), Acting Commissioner of the U.S. Immigration and Naturalization Service (2002–2003), Assistant Secretary of Commerce for Export Enforcement (2001–2002), and an Assistant U.S. Attorney in the Southern District of New York (1992–2001).

For his work in a number of high-profile terrorism investigations and trials as Assistant U.S. Attorney, Garcia received two Attorney General's Awards for Exceptional Service (1994, 1997), the Attorney General's Award for Distinguished Service (2002), and the CIA's Agency Seal Medallion (2002).

== Early life and education ==
Garcia was born in 1961 in the Woodhaven neighborhood of the New York City borough of Queens and grew up in Valley Stream where he attended Valley Stream Central High School on Long Island.

Originally intending to be a journalist, Garcia earned undergraduate and master's degrees in English literature from SUNY Binghamton and the College of William & Mary, respectively. Garcia eventually decided to study law and graduated as valedictorian of the Albany Law School of Union University in 1989.

== Career ==
After law school, Garcia practiced corporate law for a year at the Wall Street law firm Cahill Gordon & Reindel. He then served as a law clerk for Judge Judith Kaye of the New York Court of Appeals from 1990 to 1992.

=== Assistant U.S. Attorney in the Southern District of New York (1992–2001) ===
From 1992 to 2001, Garcia was a prosecutor with the Office of the U.S. Attorney for the Southern District of New York. In that role, he was intimately involved in a number of high-profile terrorism investigations and trials.

Within months of joining the Office, Garcia was assigned to the trial team prosecuting four defendants for perpetrating the 1993 World Trade Center bombing. In the ensuing trial, the four defendants were convicted on all counts. For his work on that case, Garcia received the Attorney General's Award for Exceptional Service, the highest reward presented by the U.S. Department of Justice. Garcia said the case "would define my career in Government service."

In 1995, Garcia went to Manila in the Philippines to direct the investigation and prosecution of the terrorist conspiracy led by Ramzi Yousef and Khalid Sheikh Mohammed to bomb 12 U.S. airliners flying from Asia to the United States. In 1996, Yousef and two other defendants were convicted of all counts. For his work on that case, Garcia received his second Attorney General's Award for Exceptional Service.

Garcia was assigned as one of the lead prosecutors in the case against four al-Qaeda operatives standing trial in New York for perpetrating the 1998 United States embassy bombings in Dar es Salaam, Tanzania and Nairobi, Kenya, which killed more than 200 people. The jury returned guilty verdicts on all 302 counts for the four defendants. For his work on that case, Garcia received the Attorney General's Award for Distinguished Service and the CIA's Agency Seal Medallion for his efforts coordinating with the intelligence community.

=== Assistant Secretary of Commerce for Export Enforcement (2001–2002) ===
From August 2001 to November 2002, Garcia served as the Senate-confirmed Assistant Secretary of Commerce for Export Enforcement in the U.S. Department of Commerce. In that role, "he was the top federal enforcer of dual-use export control laws."

=== Acting Commissioner of the U.S. Immigration and Naturalization Service (2002–2003) ===
Garcia served as Acting Commissioner of the U.S. Immigration and Naturalization Service (INS) from December 2002 to February 2003. In that position, he led the transition of the agency into the Department of Homeland Security.

=== Assistant Secretary for Immigration and Customs Enforcement (2003–2005) ===
From March 2003 to 2005, Garcia served in the Department of Homeland Security as the Senate-confirmed Assistant Secretary for Immigration and Customs Enforcement (ICE), the second largest investigative agency in the U.S. government following the FBI.

On January 15, 2004, Garcia announced the government had busted a Belarus-based international child pornography ring, including the arrest of more than 30 people on federal charges relating to child pornography and money laundering. On March 19, 2005, Garcia announced a record $11 million civil immigration settlement with Walmart for its use of several hundred undocumented janitorial workers.

Overlapping with this period, from 2003 to 2006, Garcia was also Vice President of the Americas for Interpol, the international police organization. While vice president, he served on Interpol's executive committee, the body charged with overseeing the budget and strategic direction of the agency.

=== U.S. Attorney for the Southern District of New York (2005–2008) ===
Garcia served as the Senate-confirmed U.S. Attorney for the Southern District of New York from September 2005 to December 1, 2008. According to The Wall Street Journal, under his tenure his "office became well known for the successful prosecution of public-corruption and terrorism-related cases." In notable white-collar criminal cases, he "obtained guilty pleas in a fraud case against former executives of collapsed financial firm Refco Inc., and successfully prosecuted both large-scale insider trading at Wall Street firms and cases of stock-option backdating." He also oversaw "a series of high-profile public corruption cases," including the Eliot Spitzer prostitution scandal, where he declined to prosecute Spitzer for violating the Mann Act, and the prosecution of several state politicians and city officials, such as former Police Commissioner Bernard Kerik and Democratic political fundraiser Norman Hsu.

In the international domain, his office "successfully prosecuted corruption cases stemming from the United Nations oil-for-food scandal." Garcia also led the prosecution of the Russian arms trafficker Viktor Bout, known as the "Merchant of Death." On March 6, 2008, Garcia announced the arrest of Bout in Bangkok, Thailand as "the culmination of a long-term D.E.A. undercover investigation that spanned the globe" and said "it marks the end of the reign of one of the world's most wanted arms traffickers." On April 13, 2013, Russia blacklisted Garcia from entering the country in retaliation for his role in the arrest and prosecution of Bout.

=== Partner at Kirkland & Ellis (2009–2016) ===
In February 2009, Garcia joined the international law firm Kirkland & Ellis as a partner in the New York office of the firm's Litigation Practice Group. He led the Government, Regulatory and Internal Investigations practice for the firm's New York office. At Kirkland & Ellis, he was engaged in matters involving insider trading, export controls, the Foreign Corrupt Practices Act, offshore tax shelters, and theft of trade secrets.

==== Chairman of the investigatory chamber of the Ethics Committee of FIFA (2012–2014) ====
On July 17, 2012, in the wake of announced anti-corruption reforms by Sepp Blatter, the president of the world association football governing body FIFA, the organization appointed U.S. lawyer Garcia as the chairman of the investigative chamber of FIFA Ethics Committee, while German judge Hans-Joachim Eckert was appointed as the chairman of the Ethics Committee's adjudication chamber.

In August 2012, Garcia declared his intention to investigate the bidding process and decision to respectively award the right to host the 2018 and 2022 FIFA World Cup to Russia and Qatar by the FIFA Executive Committee. Garcia delivered his subsequent 350-page report in September 2014, and Eckert then announced that it would not be made public for legal reasons.

On November 13, 2014, Eckert released a 42-page summary of his findings after reviewing Garcia's report. The summary cleared both Russia and Qatar of any wrongdoing during the bidding for the 2018 and 2022 World Cups, leaving Russia and Qatar free to stage their respective World Cups.

FIFA welcomed "the fact that a degree of closure has been reached," while the Associated Press wrote that the Eckert summary "was denounced by critics as a whitewash." Hours after the Eckert summary was released, Garcia himself criticized it for being "materially incomplete" with "erroneous representations of the facts and conclusions," while declaring his intention to appeal to FIFA's Appeal Committee. On December 16, 2014, FIFA's Appeal Committee dismissed Garcia's appeal against the Eckert summary as "not admissible." FIFA also stated that Eckert's summary was "neither legally binding nor appealable." A day later, Garcia resigned from his role as FIFA ethics investigator in protest of FIFA's conduct, citing a "lack of leadership" and lost confidence in the independence of Eckert from FIFA.

In June 2015, Swiss authorities claimed the report was of "little value".

=== Court of Appeals (2016–present) ===
Garcia was appointed as associate judge of the New York Court of Appeals by Governor Andrew Cuomo on January 20, 2016. He was confirmed by the New York State Senate and took the oath of office on February 8, 2016. In 2017, Adam Goldman of The New York Times reported Garcia was viewed favorably by some FBI agents as he was considered to replace James Comey.

== Community service ==
Garcia has been on the board of trustees of El Museo del Barrio, a Manhattan museum specializing in Latin American and Caribbean art, since 2010. Since 2013, he has served as the first vice chair of the museum's board. In March 2015, the board of El Museo elected Garcia as chairman. His term as chair began on June 3 of that year.

== Awards and honors ==
Awards and honors Garcia has received include:

- 1994: Attorney General's Award for Exceptional Service (for work on the 1993–1994 trial of four defendants convicted of the 1993 World Trade Center bombing)
- 1997: Attorney General's Award for Exceptional Service (for work on the 1996 trial of Ramzi Yousef and two others convicted of plotting to bomb 12 U.S. airliners)
- 2002: Attorney General's Award for Distinguished Service (for work on the 2001 trial of four al-Qaeda operatives convicted of the 1998 U.S. embassy bombings in East Africa)
- 2002: CIA Agency Seal Medallion (for his efforts coordinating with the intelligence community in the 1998 U.S. embassy bombings case)

== See also ==
- List of Hispanic and Latino American jurists

Government offices
Preceded by James Ziglar	Commissioner of the Immigration and Naturalization Service; Acting; 2002–2003	Position abolished
New office	Assistant Secretary of Homeland Security for Immigration and Customs Enforcement; 2003–2005	Succeeded by John Clark; Acting
Legal offices
Preceded by Susan Phillips Read	Associate Judge of the New York Court of Appeals; 2016–present	Incumbent
