= Steve Goddard =

Steve Goddard is a former head of refereeing for the South African Football Association (SAFA), originally from England.

== Early life ==
Goddard participated in many events with Welsh choirs and had also worked as a sound engineer.

== Playing career ==
Goddard played for New Mill in the Huddersfield District League in the 1960s.

== FIFA's fraud case ==
In 2016 Steve Goddard along with Adeel Carelse and Leslie Sedibe were suspended by FIFA for violating rules of "conduct, loyalty and disclosure, cooperation and reporting".

More specifically Steve Goddard was banned for 2 years for his alleged involvement in match-fixing.
