= Hans-Joachim Eckert =

German jurist

- Born: 1948 (age 77–78); Plochingen
- Occupation: Judge
- Years active: 1978–2015
- Title: Chairman of the Adjudicatory Chamber of the FIFA Ethics Committee
- Term: 2012–2017
- Successor: Vassilios Skouris

Hans-Joachim Eckert (born 1948, in Plochingen) is a German jurist. He was Presiding Judge of the business court division at the Regional Court Munich I from October 2005 to July 2015. Between 17 July 2012 and 10 May 2017, he was the first chairman of the Adjudicatory Chamber of the FIFA Ethics Committee.

== Background and education ==
Eckert was born in Plochingen, Baden-Württemberg. Shortly after he was born, his family moved to Upper Bavaria. He completed his Abitur in Freising and then studied jurisprudence in Munich.

== Professional career ==
Between 1978 and 1985 Eckert was judge at the Regional Court Munich I, criminal division, and then public prosecutor at the Munich public prosecutor's office II. From 1985 to 1991 he worked as a judge at the Regional Court Munich I, civil division, and from 1991 to 1998 he was a prosecutor at the prosecutor's office Munich II, as head of department responsible for tax evasion, economic crimes and organized crime. From 1998 to 1999 he was senior public prosecutor at the Higher Regional Court Munich, where he was head of division and responsible for money laundering, organized crime and international relations.

From 1999 to 2003 he was then senior public prosecutor at the Munich public prosecutor's office I. As head of division for criminal cases and economic crime, Eckert was responsible for information privacy, Nazi crimes, economic and organized crimes. In September 2003 he became Presiding Judge at the Regional Court Munich I and until September 2005 was focused on drug-related crimes.

From October 2005 until his retirement in July 2015, Eckert was Presiding Judge of the business court division at the Regional Court Munich I.

The focus of his activities were corruption cases, tax evasion, general economic crime, organized crime, money laundering, cybercrime, and asset forfeiture.

Eckert was also active internationally for the European Commission, in Bulgaria, Serbia, and Turkey. In Bulgaria he was assigned by the European Union to advise the government and to help build a prosecutor's office specialized on corruption. In addition, he examined in cooperation with an Italian Mafia investigator 300 unsolved murders there.

Eckert lectures on organized crime, cybercrime and asset forfeiture at the German Judges Academy, the Academy of European Law and in the training institutes of the Bavarian State Police.

== Legal proceedings ==
He has been a presiding judge at the Regional Court Munich I for a number of known court cases in relation to economic crime, including corruption processes associated with bribes at Siemens, Ferrostaal and MAN SE.

He also led the court process for the purchase of Hypo Alpe-Adria-Bank International by BayernLB.

== FIFA Ethics Committee ==
Hans Joachim Eckert was elected to the FIFA Ethics Committee in 2011. On 17 July 2012, he was named chairman of the adjudicatory chamber of the FIFA Ethics Committee by the FIFA Executive Committee. This decision was confirmed in May 2013 by a FIFA Congress. End of 2014, his work was criticized by the chief investigator of the FIFA Ethics Committee Michael J. Garcia. At the same time, Garcia stepped down from his position. In October 2015, the Adjudicatory Chamber of the FIFA Ethics Committee, chaired by Eckert, imposed a provisional suspension of 90 days against FIFA President Sepp Blatter, FIFA Secretary General Jérôme Valcke and UEFA President Michel Platini. On 23 November 2015, Eckert opened the official proceedings against Blatter and Platini. Upon closure of the procedure, Eckert announced on 21 December 2015 the sentence and imposed upon both a ban of eight years as well as fines. He opened the case against Valcke at the beginning of January 2016. The judgment was delivered on 12 January 2016. Valcke was banned for 12 years and fined SFr.100.000.

In May 2017 he was controversially told that he would not be renominated after he had already been invited and traveled to the FIFA Congress in Bahrain. In an interview with Deutschlandfunk he explained that critical persons would apparently rather be replaced. He was replaced by Vassilios Skouris.

== Sports Governance Unit ==
Together with Cornel Borbély, the former chairman of the investigatory chamber of the FIFA Ethics Committee, and Marc Tenbücken, a communications expert, Borbély founded the Sports Governance Unit in November 2017, which advises sports associations, clubs and sponsors on good governance.

== Personal ==
Eckert picks mushrooms in his spare time. He also visits a Realschule in the Bavarian Oberland to explain the judiciary system to students.
