= FIFA Ethics Committee =

Judicial bodies of FIFA

- Headquarters: Zürich
- Chairman of the Investigatory Chamber: María Claudia Rojas
- Chairman of the Adjudicatory Chamber: Vassilios Skouris

The FIFA Ethics Committee is one of FIFA's three judicial bodies. It is organized in two chambers, the Investigatory Chamber and the Adjudicatory Chamber. Its duties are regulated by several official documents, most importantly the FIFA Code of Ethics. FIFA's other judicial bodies are the Disciplinary Committee and the Appeal Committee.

== Investigatory Chamber ==
The Investigatory Chamber's main task is to investigate potential violations of the FIFA Code of Ethics. Investigations can be carried out at any time, on the discretion of the Investigatory Chamber. In prima facie cases, the chamber has to open investigations. The chamber has to inform all parties involved that an investigation is being carried out, except for situations in which such information could harm the investigations. Investigatory methods include written inquiries and interviews with the parties and other witnesses. Investigations can, if necessary, be conducted by several members of the chamber and can also be assisted by third parties. At the end of an investigation, the chamber delivers a final report to the Adjudicatory Chamber. Should new and important information regarding an investigation come to light, however, the chamber can reopen an investigatory process.

== Adjudicatory Chamber ==
The Adjudicatory Chamber has to review the reports of the Investigatory Chamber and decide whether a case should be proceeded or closed. The Adjudicatory Chamber has the right to return a report to the Investigatory Chamber or carry out further investigations on its own behalf. After reviewing a report of the Investigatory Chamber and after conducting further investigations if deemed necessary, the Adjudicatory Chamber sends a report to all parties involved and asks for their statements.

In addition, the Adjudicatory Chamber has to finally decide on appropriate sanctions. Sanctions must relate to the three fundamental documents regulating the conduct of any person related to FIFA. These documents are the FIFA Code of Ethics, the FIFA Disciplinary Code and the FIFA Statutes. Thus, sanctions can range from warnings and reprimands for lesser cases of misbehavior up to lifelong bans on taking part in any football-related activity worldwide.

== Membership ==
The chairmen of FIFA's judicial bodies and their deputies are elected directly by the FIFA Congress and can only be deposed from their offices by the FIFA Congress. The term of office is four years. Members can, however, be re-elected. Chairmen and deputy chairmen of both chambers have to be qualified to practice law and the individual members of the two chambers should be put together in order to ensure an overall high degree of qualifications with regard to their task. In addition, the members of the Ethics Committee should also represent the respective FIFA member associations in an appropriate way.

The members of FIFA's judicial bodies must not serve as members of the executive committee or any other of FIFA's standing committees.

=== Independence ===
The chairmen and deputy chairmen of the two chambers of the Ethics Committee as well as the chairman of the FIFA Audit and Compliance Committee have to fulfill the independence criteria set up in the Standing Orders of the Congress.

To ensure that the independence criteria are met by the respective committee members, annual reviews of the incumbent chairmen and deputy chairmen as well as candidates for chairmen and deputy chairmen of the Ethics Committee and the Audit and Compliance Committee are mandatory. Reviews must be conducted by another committee. Therefore, the Ethics Committee's members are being reviewed by the Audit and Compliance Committee, which in turn is being reviewed by the Investigatory Chamber of the Ethics Committee.

In addition, the Ethics Committee conducts the integrity checks for the following FIFA offices: FIFA President, all members of the executive committee, chairman, deputy chairman and members of the Audit and Compliance Committee, and all chairmen, deputy chairmen and members of FIFA's judicial bodies, with the obvious exception of the Ethics Committee itself, which is checked by the Audit and Compliance Committee. No FIFA committee is allowed to review or check its own members.

=== Members ===
Name	Nationality
Chairman
María Claudia Rojas (Investigatory Chamber)	Colombia
Vassilios Skouris (Adjudicatory Chamber)	Greece
Deputy Chairman
Djimrabaye Bourngar (Investigatory Chamber)	Chad
Alan Sullivan (Adjudicatory Chamber)	Australia
Bruno de Vita (Investigatory Chamber)	Canada
Member Investigatory Chamber
He Jiahong	China
Janet Katisya	Kenya
Michael Llamas	Gibraltar
Jose Ernesto Mejia Portillo	Honduras
John Tougon	Vanuatu
Member Adjudicatory Chamber
Akihiro Hara	Japan
Yngve Hallén	Norway
Jack Kariko	Papua New Guinea
Alan Rothenberg	United States
Oscar Scavone	Paraguay
Anin Yeboah	Ghana
Guillermo Iroy	Philippines

== History ==
Since 1998, FIFA has implemented an increasing number of rules and regulations intended to modernize and improve the accountability and transparency of its governance processes. In the wake of accusations of bribery of referees in 2006, FIFA decided to create an Ethics Committee, with the aim of investigating allegations of corruption in football. In the beginning, the Ethics Committee was first headed by Sebastian Coe, and between 2010 and 2012 by the former Swiss football player and attorney at law Claudio Sulser.

However, it was not until 2011 that Mark Pieth, a criminal law professor at the University of Basel, Switzerland, and head of the FIFA Independent Governance Committee (IGC), started to assess the FIFA structures. Pieth subsequently published a report with suggestions for an indepth reform of the Ethics Committee in order to establish a modernized body for FIFA-internal investigations and jurisdiction. The ICG was constituted as an external advisory board for FIFA by the Executive Committee on 17 December 2011. It had a mandate until the end of 2013.

In the beginning, the IGC-report received substantial criticism, including from within the IGC itself. Sylvia Schenk, sports adviser of Transparency International (TI), criticized that Pieth received payments from FIFA for his work. Schenk refrained from becoming a member of IGC. Roger A. Pielke, Jr., who also authored a publication on the accountability of FIFA, stated in his blog The Least Thing that Pieth, or his Basel-based Institute of Governance, had received US$128,000 for his work and could therefore not be regarded as acting independent. Pieth, however, replied that it is best practice for any organization to remunerate audit reports, because "we can't start asking audit firms to do their job for free just to make sure they are independent."

Much controversy also erupted around the question whether the IGC should be allowed to take a stance on earlier cases of potential corruption. Meanwhile, this issue has been codified in the 2012 FIFA Code of Ethics. The Ethics Committee's Investigatory Chamber has the right to investigate into previous allegations of bribery.

The FIFA Ethics Committee has a history of corruption and controversy. The 2014 World Cup in Brazil was criticized for fraudulent billing and producing hundreds of tons of waste from the building and usage of stadiums. From 2014 onwards, pressure began to build as both public and general media recognized inconsistencies and policy violations across FIFA-run tournaments. According to Sahiba Gill, author of "Whose Game? FIFA, Corruption, and the Challenge of Global Governance", the FIFA Ethics Committee's ignorant confusion towards its past reforms and public addresses don't suffice. Gill would go on to suggest that complete public transparency is the only viable avenue left for FIFA.

Paul MacInnes of The Guardian continue to accuse The Ethics Committee of lacking decency and awareness to publicly recognize these problems. One problem that was recognized by the committee in 2014 was that of bribery involving referees receiving expensive watches from Brazilian higher-ups. A document from the United States Department of Justice described in full detail the sentencing of nine FIFA officials and five FIFA executives. Not only was this blatant and beyond face-saving, but was detrimental to the tournament and its no-tolerance policies against bribery. Scholars estimate that FIFA's past two decades of corruption totals around $150 million. Even though FIFA is governed by Swiss law, authorities there have largely ignored the allegations toward FIFA and its ethics committee until confronted by U.S. authorities in 2015.

In 2010, Qatar was chosen to be the first Middle Eastern country to host a World Cup. Not only was this debated and controversial because of law differences, but also because of well-documented human rights atrocities. Sepp Blatter, former president and president at the time of selection, was quoted saying that "It was a bad choice". Despite this, the FIFA Ethics Committee gave the seal of approval on Qatar as the 2022 World Cup host.

The FIFA Ethics Committee was put in place to police and regulate foul play and poor decisions made by FIFA representatives. The committee's history with policy violations and human rights debates have attracted concerns that FIFA lacks the competency and discipline to address them. A lack of consideration of human rights in the committee showed that, while the public recognized the difficulties with selecting Qatar as the next host, they were willing to look past these claims by the media/public. Qatar's recent history with media claims of tolerating human rights atrocities and having a disregard for FIFA's policies proved a difficult task for FIFA to handle and cover up. FIFA announced its first human rights policy in 2017 following the decision for Qatar to host the 2022 World Cup.

The conversation surrounding human rights violations started primarily in reference to Qatar's mistreatment involving migrant workers which make up 90% of its labor force. In addition to human rights violations, the FIFA Ethics Committee gave Qatar the go ahead despite the controversy surrounding its temperatures of 50 degrees Celsius (122 degrees Fahrenheit) during the summer months. This is another public criticism that wasn't confronted despite the numerous complaints mentioning heat exhaustion and the countless other bids from countries that would be far more suitable as a host.

Speaking on Qatar's questionable behavior, Hans-Joachim Eckert, head of the adjudicatory arm of FIFA's ethics committee, mentioned that "the effects of these occurrences on the bidding process as a whole were far from reaching any threshold that would require returning to the bidding process, let alone reopening it".

=== Investigatory Chamber and the Adjudicatory Chamber ===
Following suggestions of the IGC's first report in 2012, the FIFA Executive Committee decided to establish two independent entities, the Investigatory Chamber and the Adjudicatory Chamber, headed by experienced and independent legal professionals. The Ethics Committee is allowed to investigate present as well as previous allegations.

In 2016, committee member Juan Pedro Damiani was being subjected to an internal investigation over the legal assistance he had provided as a lawyer to Eugenio Figueredo, a football official who had been charged by US authorities with wire fraud and money laundering, as part of the 2015 FIFA corruption case. After a preliminary investigation was opened by the Ethics Committee's Investigatory Chamber, Damiani resigned from the Ethics Committee on 6 April 2016.

In early 2017 reports became public about FIFA president Gianni Infantino attempting to prevent the re-elections of both chairmen of the ethics committee during the FIFA congress in May 2017. On 9 May 2017, following Infantino's proposal, the FIFA Council decided not to renew the mandates of Cornel Borbély and Hans-Joachim Eckert. Together with the chairmen, eleven of 13 committee members were removed. Borbely and Eckert claimed that when ousted, they were in the process of investigating hundreds of cases and that their removal was a "setback for the fight against corruption" and that "meant the de facto end of Fifa's reform efforts".

== Football officials banned ==
Football officials banned by FIFA Ethics Committee include:

- (Nigeria) Amos Adamu
- (Afghanistan) Sayed Aghazada
- (Madagascar) Ahmad Ahmad
- (South Sudan) Chabour Goc Alei
- (Mongolia) Ganbold Bayannemekh
- (Panama) Ariel Alvarado
- (Germany) Franz Beckenbauer
- (Colombia) Luis Bedoya
- (Switzerland) Sepp Blatter
- (United States) Chuck Blazer
- (New Caledonia) Edmond Bowen
- (Honduras) Rafael Leonardo Callejas Romero
- (South Africa) Adeel Carelse
- (Niger) Ibrahim Chaibou
- (Ecuador) Luis Chiriboga
- (Qatar) Najeeb Chirakal
- (Papua New Guinea) David Chung
- (India) Albert Colaco
- (United States) Aaron Davidson
- (Argentina) Eduardo Deluca
- (Equatorial Guinea) Domingo Mituy Edjang
- (Venezuela) Rafael Esquivel
- (Togo) Koukou Hougnimon Fagla
- (Haiti) Yvette Félix
- (Sri Lanka) Vernon Manilal Fernando
- (Uruguay) (United States) Eugenio Figueredo
- (South Africa) Steve Goddard
- (Papua New Guinea) Johan Wesley Gonjuan
- (Haiti) Rosnick Grant
- (Qatar) Mohammed bin Hammam
- (The Bahamas) Lionel Haven
- (Honduras) Alfredo Hawit
- (Cameroon) Issa Hayatou
- (Chile) Sergio Jadue
- (Haiti) Yves Jean-Bart
- (Liberia) Musa Hassan Bility
- (Guatemala) Brayan Jiménez
- (Haiti) Nella Joseph
- (Sierra Leone) Abu Bakarr Kabba
- (Afghanistan) Kerramuudin Karim
- (Germany) (Switzerland) Markus Kattner
- (South Africa) Lindile Kika
- (Botswana) Mooketsi Kgotlele
- (Guam) Richard K. Lai
- (Paraguay) (Colombia) Nicolás Leoz
- (Costa Rica) Eduardo Li
- (Nicaragua) Julio Rocha López
- (Thailand) Worawi Makudi
- (Tanzania) Jamal Malinzi
- (Tanzania) Oden Charles Mbaga
- (Brazil) José Maria Marin
- (Argentina) José Luis Meiszner
- (Zambia) Boniface Mwamelo
- (Chile) Harold Mayne-Nicholls
- (Republic of the Congo) Jean Guy Blaise Mayolas
- (Qatar) Saoud Al-Mohannadi
- (South Korea) Chung Mong-joon
- (Mozambique) Sadio Jose Mugadza
- (South Africa) Jonathan Musavengana
- (Paraguay) Juan Ángel Napout
- (Guinea-Bissau) Manuel Irénio Lopes Nascimento
- (New Zealand) Tai Nicholas
- (South Africa) Kirsten Nematandani
- (Central African Republic) Patrice Edouard Ngaissona
- (Germany) Wolfgang Niersbach
- (Bolivia) Romer Osuna
- (Republic of the Congo) Constant Omari
- (France) Michel Platini
- (Afghanistan) Sediqi Rustam
- (Guatemala) Rafael Salguero
- (Colombia) Enrique Sanz de Santamaria
- (South Africa) Leslie Sedibe
- (Peru) Manuel Burga Seoane
- (Russia) Alexander Shprygin
- (Nigeria) Samson Siasia
- (Laos) Viphet Sihachakr
- (Cayman Islands) Costas Takkas
- (Togo) Bana Tchanilé
- (Nigeria) Reynald Temarii
- (Brazil) Ricardo Teixeira
- (Nepal) Ganesh Thapa
- (France) Jérôme Valcke
- (Republic of the Congo) Badji Mombo Wantete
- (Trinidad and Tobago) Daryll Warner
- (Trinidad and Tobago) Jack Warner
- (Cayman Islands) Jeffrey Webb
- (Zimbabwe) Obert Zhoya
