= Ricardo Teixeira =

Brazilian football administrator (b. 1947)

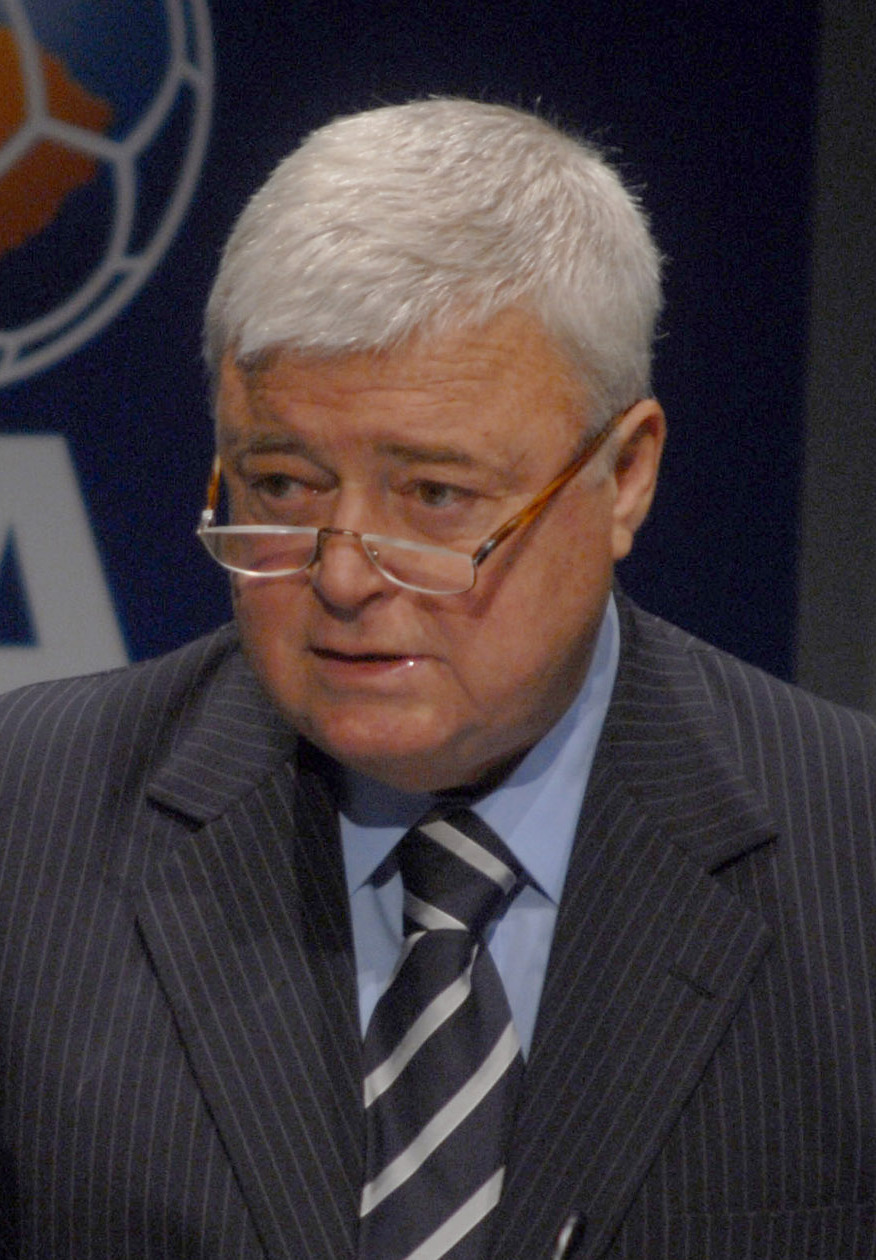

President of CBF
- In office January 16, 1989 – March 12, 2012
- Preceded by: Octávio Pinto Guimarães
- Succeeded by: José Maria Marin

Personal details
- Born: June 20, 1947 (age 79) Carlos Chagas, Brazil

Ricardo Terra Teixeira (pronounced [ʁiˈkaʁdu ˈtɛʁɐ tejˈʃejɾɐ]; born June 20, 1947) is the former president of the Brazilian Football Confederation (CBF). He was in the office from January 16, 1989 to March 12, 2012. In July 2012 a Swiss prosecutor's report revealed that, during his tenure on FIFA's Executive Committee, he and his former father-in-law Joao Havelange took more than $41 million in bribes in connection with the award of World Cup marketing rights.

== Life and career ==
Born in Carlos Chagas, Minas Gerais, Ricardo Teixeira married Lúcia Havelange, the daughter of João Havelange. They divorced in 1997 after almost 30 years of marriage. His son, Ricardo Teixeira Havelange born in 1974 bears his mother's last name, opposing the Brazilian custom.

In 1989, Teixeira was first elected the president of CBF succeeding Octávio Pinto Guimarães and defeating Nabi Abi Chedid, the president of Federação Paulista de Futebol at the time. BBC journalist Tim Vickery has suggested that he would not have been elected "had he not at the time been the son-in-law of vastly influential former FIFA boss Joao Havelange." At the time of his resignation Teixeira was serving his sixth term as head of the CBF.

Angry that his television company had been rejected in a contest for domestic rights, in 1993 Brazilian footballer Pelé accused Teixeira of corruption, which led to an eight-year feud between Pelé and Havelange. As a result, Havelange banned Pelé from the draw for the 1994 FIFA World Cup in Las Vegas. Criticisms that resulted from the banning of Pelé were perceived to have had a negative effect on Havelange's chances of re-election as FIFA President in 1994.

== Corruption allegations ==
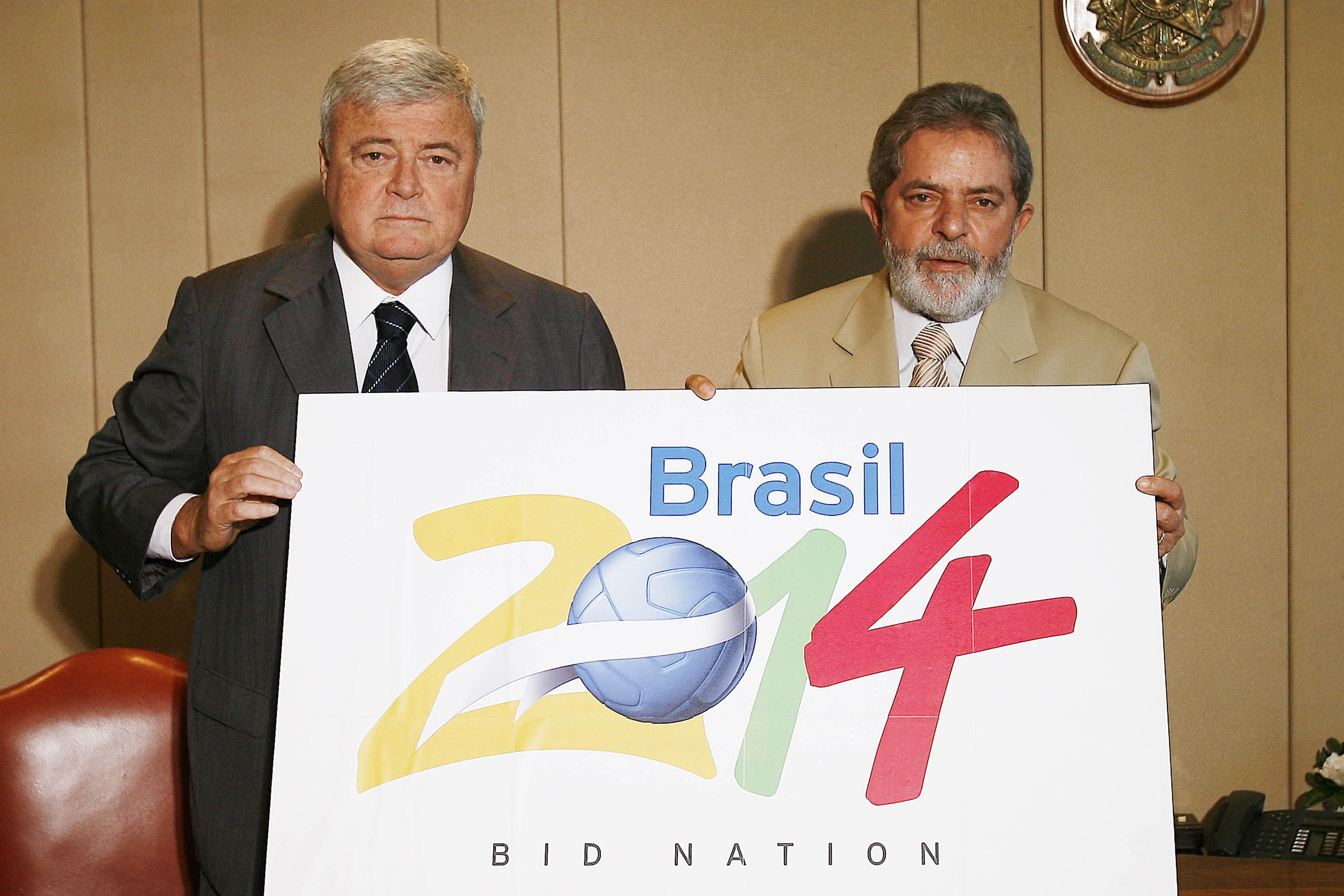
Teixeira with Lula in 2007

In 1994, after winning the World Cup in the USA, the Brazilian team returned home in a private flight. On arrival in Brazil, Teixeira refused to abide by the rules of Brazilian Customs, on the grounds that "a title of the Brazilian Team is worthy much more than the custom taxes"; later on, it was discovered that many players had brought boxes of undeclared items (particularly computers and electronic appliances, which were expensive in Brazil at the time), and that Teixeira himself had packed a full beer-making machine, that he used in a bar he opened a few months later. After a long dispute with Brazilian IRS, Teixeira paid the due taxes and fines.

In 2000, Teixeira faced a Probing Commission in Brazilian Congress. He was charged of taking illegal advantage of contracts with Nike: the Brazil Team would satisfy Nike's interests, and Teixeira would rake the financial gains. Again, Teixeira had to pay taxes on the basis of non-declared revenues.

In November 2010 Andrew Jennings, the presenter of "FIFA's Dirty Secrets", an edition of BBC's flagship current affairs programme Panorama, alleged that Teixeira had taken bribes in the 1990s regarding the awarding of contracts for the sale of television rights to the football World Cup., Teixeira waited until 25 July 2011 to respond to the allegations, at which point he attacked The Football Association, saying he would "make their lives hell" as long as he remained a member of FIFA's ruling Executive Committee.

The Brazilian authorities started in October 2011 an investigation to evaluate the possibility of money laundering by Ricardo Teixeira through the Brazilian Football Confederation. The authorities will have 90 days to complete the investigation, which also alleges the involvement of João Havelange as part of the scheme. Andrew Jennings told the Senate committee that Ricardo Teixeira may have amassed $9.5m in bribes from now-defunct FIFA marketing firm ISL.

In July 2012 after protracted court proceedings, Havelange and Teixeira were named as beneficiaries of bribes from ISL. A document released by a prosecutor in the canton of Zug revealed that from 1992 to 2000 Havelange and Teixeira were paid 41m CHF by ISL.

At the time of the payment of the bribes, commercial bribery was not a crime in Switzerland. In 1997 as President of FIFA Havelange had granted ISL FIFA's exclusive marketing rights, and exclusive TV and radio rights to the 2002 and 2006 World Cups in 1998. ISL paid FIFA 200m CHF for the marketing rights and $1.4bn for the TV rights. After ISL's bankruptcy its liquidators examined all payments made by the company.

FIFA, under the presidency of Sepp Blatter, was found to have known about the bribes, yet argued it did not need to have the money repaid. Prosecutions were mounted for alleged embezzlement against Havelange and Teixeira, but were stopped in May 2010, after Havelange and Texeira repaid 500,000 and 2.5m CHF respectively. The repayments were considered reasonable due to the fact that bribes paid before 1995 were outside the statute of limitations, and Havelange's advanced age. The prosecutor also believed that Havelange and Teixeira were guilty of criminal breaches of their duties to serve FIFA as senior executives.

On 29 November 2019, Teixeira was found guilty of bribery and sanctioned with a ban for life by FIFA as part of an investigation into corruption.

== piauí controversy ==
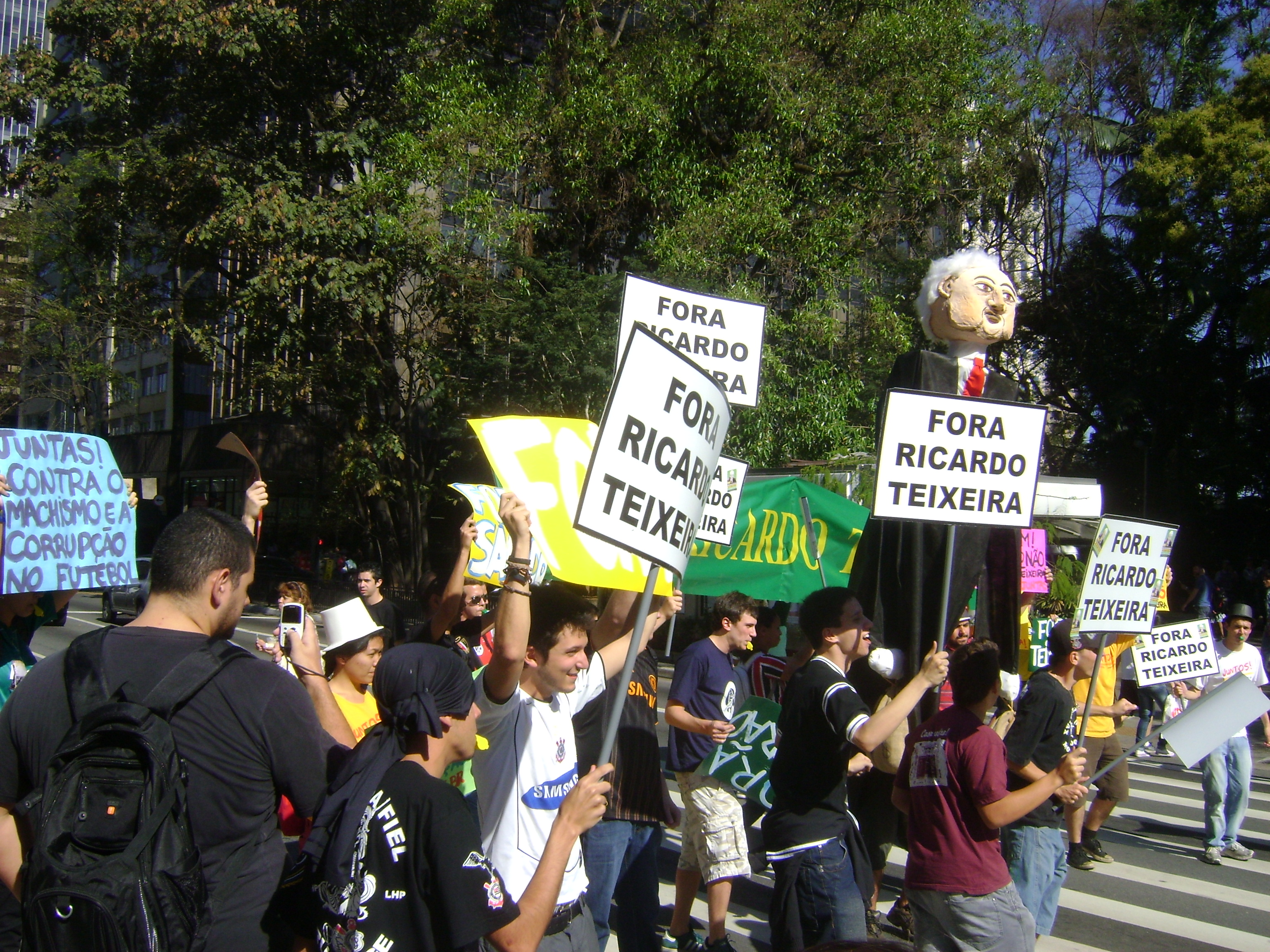
Demonstration against Teixeira in São Paulo, Brazil, August 2011.

The July 2011 issue of the Brazilian magazine piauí published a profile of Teixeira written by journalist Daniela Pinheiro. Pinheiro spent ten days in Switzerland with Teixeira while he was there to attend the 61st FIFA Congress. In the eight page article, Teixeira talked about football politics, the ensuing 2014 FIFA World Cup in Brazil, the Brazilian press and corruption allegations against him and other FIFA members. During the course of the interviews, he brushed off the accusations with profanities (such as caguei, a Portuguese swear-word for the verb "to defecate" which also means, roughly, "I couldn't care less") and boasted he was able to do whatever he wanted during the 2014 World Cup including denying press credentials to those who are critical of him or changing match schedules at his own pleasure.

All of Teixeira's declarations were later confirmed by Rodrigo Paiva, head of public relations for the Brazilian Football Confederation (CBF). The remarks stirred a lot of controversy in both the Brazilian press and Brazilian society, and sparked the Twitter campaign #foraricardoteixeira ("Out with Ricardo Teixeira").

Preceded by Danny Jordaan with Irvin Khoza	FIFA World Cup Chief Organizer; 2014	Succeeded by TBD
