= Nicolás Leoz =

Football administrator (1928–2019)

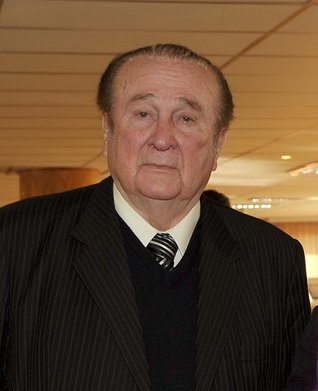
- Leoz in 2009

President of CONMEBOL
- In office 1 May 1986 – 30 April 2013
- Preceded by: Teófilo Salinas Fuller
- Succeeded by: Eugenio Figueredo

Personal details
- Born: Nicolás Leoz Almirón; 10 September 1928 Asunción, Paraguay
- Died: 28 August 2019 (aged 90) Asunción, Paraguay
- Spouse: María Clemencia Pérez
- Profession: Journalist

Nicolás Leoz Almirón (10 September 1928 – 28 August 2019) was President of CONMEBOL (South American Football Confederation) from 1986 to 2013. Leoz assumed the presidency in 1986 (succeeding Teófilo Salinas Fuller) and in February 2006, he was reelected as President for a sixth term. He was Paraguayan and received Colombian citizenship in 2008. On 23 April 2013, Leoz resigned from both the FIFA Executive Committee and the CONMEBOL presidency, citing health issues.

Before his position as President of CONMEBOL, Leoz was President of the Justice Department of the Paraguayan Basketball Confederation (1957–1959), President of Paraguayan soccer Club Libertad (1969–1970 and 1974–1977), President of the Asociación Paraguaya de Fútbol (1971–1973 and 1979–1985) and Vice President of CONMEBOL (1972–1974 and 1980–1986).

In November 2010 he was alleged by the BBC to have taken bribes in the 1990s regarding the awarding of World Cup television rights.

In May 2015, Leoz was banned by the FIFA Ethics Committee for accepting bribes, money laundering, wire fraud and racketeering.

== Youth and early career ==
Leoz was born in Asunción-Pirizal, Paraguay. His childhood was spent in Pirizal, in the industrial complex of Carlos Casado, near the Paraguay River, Puerto Casado today is known as Puerto La Victoria.

From 1940 to 1950, Leoz was a sports journalist in radio and newspapers.

In 1957, he studied law at the School of Law and Social Sciences of the UNA (National University of Asunción) and as a student took office in Judiciary as a scribe in interrogations; he graduated on 24 December 1957, at 29 years age.

From 1950 to 1962, he was a history teacher at the Colegio Nacional de la Capital, Nacional de Niñas and Comercio. He was also a director for an aluminum enterprise and in agricultural livestock.

From 1957 to 1977, he was president of the Tribunal de Justicia de la Confederación Paraguaya de Básquetbol.

- Doctor "Honoris causa" from Universidade of Rio de Janeiro, Brazil.
- Member of Honor of the Universidad Nacional of San Agustín of Arequipa, Peru.

== Timeline of football career ==
Year	Main activities
1968–1977	President of Club Libertad.
1971–1973; 1979–1985	President of Liga Paraguaya de Fútbol.
1972–1974; 1980–1986	Vice-President of CONMEBOL.
1986–2013	President of CONMEBOL, a position he assumed on 1 May 1986 20 years when reelected in 5 periods in different Congresses in cities Bogotá and Asunción three times and Mar del Plata on.
1998–2013	Member of the Executive FIFA, representing South America.
2002–2004	Member of the committees of the entity Security and Fair Play, emergency, Strategic Studies, organizer of the 2002 FIFA World Cup, Organizer of the Cup FIFA, and Confederations Task Force of 2004.

== Corruption cases ==
In November 2010, Andrew Jennings, the presenter of FIFA's Dirty Secrets, an edition of BBC's flagship current affairs programme Panorama alleged that Leoz had taken bribes in the 1990s regarding the awarding of contracts for the sale of television rights to the football World Cup. Panorama claimed to have obtained a confidential document from a company called ISL which showed that Leoz was paid $730,000 by the company. ISL won the contract to distribute the television rights. Leoz has not responded to the allegations.

In May 2011, Lord Triesman named Leoz while giving evidence at a Parliamentary inquiry into football governance in London. Nicolas Leoz has been accused of requesting an honorary knighthood in reward for supporting a World Cup bid for England. It was later revealed in email exchanges involving his aide that Leoz would consider visiting England if the FA Cup, the oldest association football competition in the world, were to be named after him.

On 23 April 2013, Leoz announced his resignation of CONMEBOL presidency to take place on 30 April 2013.

On 3 June 2015, Leoz was named on an INTERPOL Red Notice.

In 2018, his extradition was approved by a Paraguayan court. Leoz appealed the decision. At the time of his death the case was pending before the Supreme Court of Paraguay.

== Family ==
Leoz was the son of Gregory Leoz Latorre (born in Navarre, Spain) and Petrona Almirón Bogarín (born in Luque, Paraguay). His brothers were Guillermo, Pomposa, Sara, Eusebio, Cesar, Modesto and Maria Teresa. He also had two brothers, Isidoro and Cesareo from his father when he married Eudosia Carmen Zorrilla.

His paternal grandparents were Cesareo Leoz Guinda and Miguela Latorre. His paternal great-grandparents were Manuel Leoz Ramon and Manuela Guinda Baztam.

== Notes ==
- News media as a scandal involving within the FIFA together with Julio Grondona who is vice president of FIFA, CSF vice-president and president of the Asociación del Fútbol Argentino. (Andrew Jennings).

== Bibliography ==
- Leoz, Nicholas, Pido la palabra. MZ Editions S.R.L., Ladino 3729. Buenos Aires-Argentina, 2001

Preceded by Teófilo Salinas Fuller	President of CONMEBOL; 1986–2013	Succeeded by Eugenio Figueredo
