= History of the Confederation of African Football =

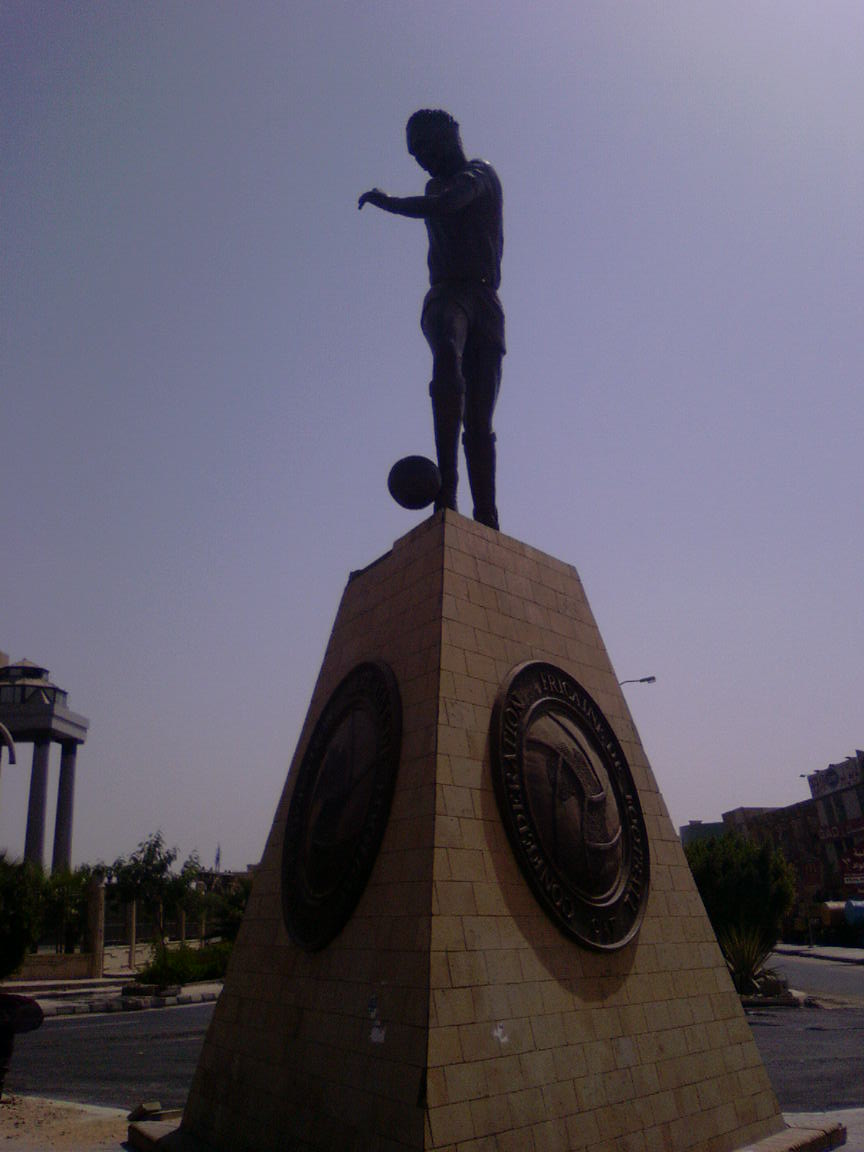
Headquarter of CAF in 6th of October City, Egypt.

From a humble beginning in 1957, the Confederation of African Football (CAF) has grown into a notable organisation with the membership of 54 football association. The confederation of African Football is also responsible for the organization of the major competitions within Africa.

CAF was a trailblazing pan-Africanist institution in the era of independence. It was one of FIFA's six continental confederations, essentially the ruling body of the game in Africa. Its main aims were to organize international tournaments and to advance the interests of Africa in world football. In sporting terms, CAF's most important task was to organize the African Nations Cup. The first Nations Cup took place at the time of CAF's official launch in Khartoum in 1957, three years before the inaugural European Nations Cup. French, English, and Arabic were made the official languages of CAF. The independence of sixteen African nations in 1960 increased the size of both CAF and the African Nations Cup.

== Formation ==
The Confederation of African Football began its formation at the 29th FIFA Congress in Bern, Switzerland, in June 1954. Africa was represented at the Congress by four national associations: Egypt, who had joined FIFA in 1923; Sudan affiliated in 1948; Ethiopia in 1953 and South Africa in 1910 and 1952.

It was at that Congress that Africa was recognized as a zonal group, with a right to have for the first time a representative on the FIFA Executive Committee. This representation was taken up by Engineer Abdel Aziz Abdallah Salem of Egypt.

It was not an easy task to get this recognition, as Argentina been against the seats given to Africa and Asia arguing that the standard of football in these continents was not good enough, despite the fact that, at the previous Congress in Paris in 1953, it was agreed that Africa would be given the right to be represented subsequently. Africa's position was supported by the four Home Nations and the eastern countries, giving a vote of 24-17 in their favor: the Congress then elected Abdel Aziz Abdallah Salem to represent Africa on the Executive Committee until a confederation was founded. Then, the African delegation agreed to meet in Lisbon in 1956 on the occasion of the FIFA Congress to realize the project.

Due to the Ethiopian Football Federation's lack of funds, Ydnekatchew Tessema was unable to travel to the historic 1954 FIFA Congress in Bern, which recognized Africa as a FIFA zone. The other African members were represented, not only in Bern, but at the 1956 Lisbon Congress as well.

== South African apartheid issue ==
A committee was also set up to look into the case of South Africa, who run two separate federations the oldest run by only whites while the other recognized (sp) the other races. The rise of apartheid in 1948 had opened another front in the struggle against racism and segregation in colonial sport. The popularity of football in black communities arose from conditions present throughout colonial Africa: economic expansion, massive urban growth, and access to Western education, albeit for a small minority. During the 1950s, black athletes, organizers, and nationalists fought a long struggle with the entrenched white interests reinforced by apartheid. The first were organized in the South African Soccer Federation (SASF), while the second were represented by the South African Football Association (SAFA). Internationally, the Federation fought a bitter struggle for recognition within FIFA. FIFA ending up denying the Federation's membership application because it did not include whites. South Africa was suspended from FIFA in 1961 and remained isolated from the world of football until 1992 (except for a one-year reprieve in 1963).

Established five years before the Organization of African Unity, and the famous Rivonia Trial that passed life sentences on Nelson Mandela, Walter Sisulu, Govan Mbeki and other black South African activists; the African football Confederation was the first International Organization to dare say no to then very strong Apartheid, as far back as 1957. At this point in history; Apartheid was acceptable both to the International Olympic Committee and to FIFA. The two heavy weight Global Sports Institutions thus labeled the unprecedented stand of the young Confederation, as one of, "mixing politics with sports". Subsequently, FIFA told the Confederation that it had no right to expel a member association of FIFA, and instructed immediate reinstatement of Apartheid South Africa. The new Confederation did not only refuse to comply, but, demanded that FIFA itself expel the racist association from membership.

This first confrontation, which could have easily caused the early withdrawal of the three African member associations, subsided briefly, when FIFA under the Presidency of Englishman Arthur Drewry promised to review the African position. However, it relapsed again, after a three-man fact finding mission led by the newly elected president, Sir Stanley Rous, traveled to South Africa, and concluded that the National Football Federation had nothing to do with Government instituted Racial Discrimination. The controversial recommendation of this delegation to readmit the South African Federation was adopted at the FIFA Congress in Cairo 1963.

The African delegation at the Congress in Lisbon, were Abdel Aziz Salem, Mohammad Latif, Youssef Mohammad (Egypt); Abdel Halim Mohammad, Abdel Rahim Shaddad, Badawi Mohammad Ali (Sudan) and Fred Fell (South Africa). They got together on June 7 and 8 at the Avenida Hotel and decided among other things to create an African Football Confederation and to organized a competition among countries beginning from 1957 in Khartoum, Sudan, where the statutes and regulations of the new body would be drawn.

== Foundation of African Cup of Nations ==
The Constitutional Assembly of CAF took place on February 8, 1957, at the Grand Hotel in Khartoum, Sudan. In attendance were Abdel Aziz Salem, Mourad Fahmy, Galal Koreitem, Moustafa Kamel Mansour and Youssef Mohammad representing Egypt, Ydnekatchew Tessema, General Aman Andom and Guebeyehu Double (Ethiopia), Abdel Halim Mohammad, Abdel Rahim Shaddad, Badawi Mohammad Ali and Ahmad Mohammad Singawi (Sudan) and Fred Fell (South Africa). The foundation of the CAF statutes came from proposed statutes by both Tessema and Shaddad while regulations were also drawn for the African Cup of Nations. Engineer Salem was elected first CAF President while Tessema, Abdel Halim and Fell were voted into the executive committee as members with Youssef Mohamed as the first honorary General Secretary. The first African Cup of Nations kicked off on February 10 without South Africa, who were disqualified after they failed to present a multi-racial team.

Ethiopia had a bye to the final, while at Khartoum Stadium, the Egyptians beat the hosting nation 2:1. The final was much easier for Egypt; 4:0 against Ethiopia, all the goals were scored by Mohammad Diab El Attar, also known as "Ad-Diba", who finished the tournament as top scorer with 5 goals. Only two games were played to give Egypt the inaugural African Champions title.

== CAF move to Cairo ==
The young organisation suffered an early setback when its important documents were lost during a fire outbreak at the offices of the Sudan Football Association where they were kept. Luckily, the statutes adopted at the Constitutional Assembly had already been sent to FIFA and they were subsequently approved by the FIFA Executive Committee on June 21, 1957, in Zürich.

Thus going by Article 5 of these statutes which stipulates that the headquarters of CAF be located in the same country as where the president resides, the organisation's first office was on 3, El Hadika Street, Garden City, Cairo.

== Appointment of Abdel Aziz Moustafa as president ==
The third CAF General Assembly took place in June 1958 in Stockholm during the FIFA Congress and World Cup. The four founding countries were represented although acting president Salem stayed away because of a strained relationship with the president of the Egyptian Football Association (EFA), Field Marshal Abdel Hakim Amer. General Abdel Aziz Moustafa will thus replace his compatriot as CAF President while Dr. Abdel Halim emerged as the first African to be elected to the FIFA Executive Committee. Mustafa Mansour also succeeded former player and referee Youssef Mohamed as CAF General Secretary.

An Extraordinary meeting was held on August 21, 1960, in Rome, with delegates from Ghana, Morocco and Tunisia also in attendance. Several issues, from the creation of an Executive Committee to a revision of the statutes were discussed. It was agreed that the next meeting be held in November in Cairo with Egypt shouldering the expenses of all delegates. However, it was not till 16 February 1961 that the Congress took place. General Moustafa was re-elected President while Mourad Fahmy took over as General Secretary. It was also decided that each national association pay an annual affiliation fee of E£50.

During the fourth Congress in Cairo in 1961, Ydnekatchew proposed the Headquarters of the Confederation be moved to Addis Ababa. Further to the main objective of ensuring a responsible Secretariat; his proposal was also the first effort for equitable distribution of duties, powers and benefits in the Confederation. Ydnekatchew hoped new members Ghana and Tunisia would support this logical proposal, but for reasons of election politics, they preferred not to challenge the status quo.

== Egypt's financial aid to the CAF ==
Fahmy had to start from the scratch as the organisation did not have money and was even indebted to a printing company. It also did not have a staff. The EFA would later rent two rooms of its new office located on the Nile to CAF courtesy of the goodwill of both Fahmy and Mostafa who were both top officials of EFA. EFA also settled CAF's utility bills while the Egyptian Olympic Committee granted this new organisation 2,000 pounds a year.

At the Extraordinary General Assembly in Addis Ababa, General Mostafa defeated Tessema to become a FIFA Vice-President while Ghana's Ohene Djan got on the FIFA Executive Committee also at the expense of Tessema.

== Attendance of Sir Stanley Rous at CAF 3rd Extraordinary General Assembly in Cairo ==
A watershed gathering of this young confederation took place on January 23 and 24 1963 when Moustafa succeeded in getting the Egyptian government to bankroll the accommodation and travel expenses of visiting delegates. Therefore, a record 23 national associations attended alongside FIFA President Sir Stanley Rous. Several ground-breaking decisions were taken at this meeting. First, the continent was divided into six geographical zones and the CAF Executive Committee was expanded to take in 12 representatives. Djan and Tessema emerged as Vice-Presidents and a new set of statutes was adopted and published.

== Establishment of African Cup of Champions Clubs ==
At the next General Assembly in Accra, on November 22, 1963, a decision was taken to create a new competition for clubs the African Cup of Champions Clubs.

A year later, during the Congress in Tokyo, on the eve of the 1964 Summer Olympics, a counter proposal co-sponsored by Ethiopia, Egypt and then new member Ghana, calling for the expulsion of Apartheid South Africa, surprisingly won the majority vote for the reduced, but equally effective suspension of Apartheid, reversing the 1963 decision. Thereafter, ceaseless efforts by Sir Stanley to change this new status were successfully blocked by Africa. As many as 25 African countries were represented during this congress, Djan was re-elected to the FIFA Executive Committee.

Head of the Algerian delegation to the Seventh CAF General Assembly in Tunis, on November 11, 1965, Dr. Mohammad Maouche, criticised the structures of the organisation leading to the formation of a study committee to make amendments to the statutes and submit them at the Extraordinary Assembly in London in July 1966.

== Tense FIFA-CAF relationship ==
Although the protracted battle on the issue of Apartheid had caused numerous disagreements in successive FIFA Congresses, none came near to a breaking point as the scheme encouraged by Sir Stanley Rous to establish a separate FIFA recognized regional Southern African Confederation, consisting mainly of South Africa, Rhodesia, Mauritius, Madagascar, Botswana and Malawi, with the obvious intent of facilitating the unchallenged readmission of Apartheid.

African Football leaders came across copies of the confidential communications on the issue and made it clear to Sir Stanley during an informal discussion just before the opening of the 1966 Congress in London, that all African Associations would walk out of the Conference Hall if FIFA was not to withdraw its unofficial support to the divisive establishment of two independent Confederations in one continent. In a compromise last minute arrangement Sir Stanley retreated, avoiding the eminent walkout by all African Associations from this Congress and the ensuing publicity it would have provoked.

This was a point in time when FIFA-CAF relations were strained to the limit, subsequent to the already declared African boycott of the 1966 FIFA World Cup hosted by England, refusing to share a single place with Asia. North Korea, winners of the Asian qualifiers got an automatic spot in the finals, representing the two continents as a result.

=== Suspension of Rhodesia ===
The other notable contentious issue in successive meetings was the demand by most African nations for the suspension of Rhodesia. The African Football Confederation was again the first International sports institution to expel the Rhodesia Football Association from membership, only four days after the country's unilateral declaration of independence on 11 November 1965. Five years later, the effort to expel Rhodesia from FIFA was taken to the Congress in Mexico City, 1970; Ydnekatchew Tessema was accompanied by renowned Ethiopian lawyer, and member of the Executive Committee of the National Federation, Tafari Benti, who assisted in preparing a legal case against Rhodesia's continued FIFA membership. African National Associations threatened to walk out if the congress did not endorse the Ethiopian argument. Concerned with the possibility of a last minute African boycott, Mexico, together with its supporters, voted in favor, thereby ensuring Rhodesia's suspension by a large majority vote.

As a result of a military coup d'état in Ghana, Djan was banned from any public gathering and was refused to travel to London. He was replaced by Tessema on the FIFA Executive Committee and a new statutes was adopted in July 1966. Among other things, the statutes stipulated the creation of six standing committees with the most important being the Organizing Committee headed by Tessema.

== Appointment of Abdel Halim Mohammad as president ==
The capital city of Ethiopia, Addis Ababa, hosted the Eighth CAF General Assembly on January 10, 1968. General Moustafa was not present and so lost his position to Dr. Abdel Halim, who was voted unanimously after Dr. Ahmad Bakr of Egypt withdrew his own candidature. Rito Alcantara from Senegal became Vice-President and was elected to the FIFA Executive Committee, as a third member, in case it was approved by FIFA. Tessema was re-elected to same position. CAF also agreed to collaborate with Supreme Council of Sports in Africa (SCSA) while also keeping its own independence.

But two years after these elections, the constituency protested that Dr Halim was not doing much towards the promised reforms. Thus, during the seventh edition of the Nations Cup in the Sudan 1970, twenty member associations signed a petition demanding the establishment of a special committee for thorough review and amendment of the statutes. Ydnekatchew Tessema was again elected chairman of this committee which included, Dr. Maouche (Algeria), Hamici (Democratic Republic of the Congo), Karrar (Sudan), Matthia (Togo), Mwade Wade (Senegal), and Chief Mensah (Ghana).

=== Africa's demand for FIFA gate income ===
Later on, during FIFA Congress in Mexico prior to the 1970 FIFA World Cup, Ethiopia proposed that FIFA should collect gate income percentage from matches between the four British associations (England, Scotland, Wales, Northern Ireland), so long as these Associations enjoy the privileges of four votes in the Congresses and four representations in the World Cups. This motion was defeated by 34 to 33 votes. Two years later, during the 1972 congress in Paris, the same motion on the four British Associations, presented by Uruguay, was adopted unanimously.

== Senegal call for change ==
FIFA President Rous was at the assembly in Yaoundé, as well as 28 national associations. A proposal by Senegal for an ad hoc committee to prepare a technical development programme that will help raise the standard of refereeing on the continent was approved. The proposed amendments to the statutes were adopted by the assembly following the support of 22 of the associations present.

Considering the noticeable interference by some elements from within and outside of the continent, who were striving to exploit this misunderstanding to further divide and weaken the Confederation, and thereby disrupt the necessary unity for the then nearly accomplished tasks of expelling Apartheid South Africa from FIFA, and achieving Africa's rightful places in the global body, Ydnekatchew Tessema, preferred not to publicize the works of the ad hoc committee. The situation was handled as an internal problem of the African Football Confederation that can only be resolved by its own general meeting.

Accordingly, the new statutes, quietly and cautiously, drafted by this ad hoc committee, were submitted to the Congress in Yaoundé. The assembly refused to discuss the amendments in detail and again empowered Ydnekatchew to preside over a new sub-committee entrusted with double checking the recommended changes. This committee worked until four o'clock in the morning and presented the final version to the Congress the next day.

The Congress in turn worked until five o'clock in the morning and adopted the new constitution of the Confederation. After two sleepless nights, the legislative for the first time asserted that it is in effect the supreme authority of the Confederation.

== Tessema as president of CAF ==
During Yaoundé's assembly CAF President Abdel Halim Mohammad lost his seat to Tessema by 15 voices to 12, though it was said that Sir Stanley Rous, who supervised the elections, openly supported Abdel Halim during the elections. Professor Rene Essomba became first Vice-President while Alcantara was second Vice-President. Abdel Halim and Alcantara were elected to the FIFA executive committee. Egypt maintained the headquarters together with the African vice Presidency in FIFA. With Tessema as President and Mourad Fahmy as General Secretary, CAF broke new grounds.

Tessema did not inherit a ready made Confederation; peace in the Confederation and total focus on the overall developmental works of the Continent's football, prevailed only after the Congress in Yaoundé 1972. He is still viewed by connoisseurs of the Confederation's history, as the most successful African football leader; who had resolved all early detective problems and directed focus towards the development of the game, not only for his era, but also, for the future of the continent's most popular sport.

It must be said here, that the differences due to this lengthy and detractive controversy; were confined to conference tables. The pioneers had always maintained enviable, mutual respect and brotherhood in their personal relationships.

In the following years, the continuous inclusion of newly liberated African countries strengthened the Confederation's position in the FIFA congresses, but, this positive development was accompanied by the undesirable by-product of Colonialism; the division between Arab Africa, Francophone Africa and Anglophone Africa, maintaining the "One Africa" motto began to be more and more complicated. This was, and still is, a challenge to unity in African football.

=== Tessema's quote controversy ===
“CAF does not need any financial support. Its budget is very healthy and its receipts exceed its expenses every year,” declared a bullish Tessema in 1986. Yet, there is some controversy upon what was published in the February 2007 special edition of the CAF magazine 'CAFOOT' as The Tessemas official website deny such quotation, stating that "The authors and/or publishers, can not produce a single evidence to substantiate this quotation. It is deliberately out of context and dishonest. Yidnekatchew had on several occasions since the beginning of unseen before revenue from live TV broadcast of the Cup of Nations, in Libya in 1982, declared, "CAF'S budget is healthy, and its receipts exceed its expenses every year", but, he had never said "C.A.F. does not need any financial support"!!

In fact, until his last FIFA Congress, in Mexico 1986, he had fought to increase Africa's share from FIFA revenues. He had gone as far as demanding the need for the revision of the statutes of FIFA; one of the Major objectives being, the equitable distribution of its revenue among all the Confederations. This meant reducing from powerful Europe to increase Africa's share."

== New clubs competition ==
In 1975, the African Cup Winners' Cup was founded while three years later an African youth competition was first organised. In 1985, CAF organised a qualifying tournament for boys less than 16 years. The finances of the confederation improved as a result of an increase in the number of the competitions it organised. In 1982, CAF sold the television and publicity rights of the Cup of Nations.

== Tessema names Hayatou as a successor ==
Eight months after 1970 FIFA World Cup in Mexico, Tessema explained the nature of his illness to member associations of the African Football Confederation, and successfully appealed to them to vote for Omar Sey of Gambia in his place, in the 1988 elections; which he very well knew would be after his life. A few months later, this succession plan was complicated with the unexpected appointment of Omar Sey as the Minister of Foreign Affairs of the Gambia. However, Ydnekatchew was not prepared to give-up, easy; when the newly appointed Minister, visited Addis Ababa for a meeting of the Organization of African Unity, in June 1987, he invited him home and made one final effort to convince him to resign from his government position and run for the presidency of the Confederation. Omar did not offend his ailing colleague with an outright no, he said he would try, but also explained the difficulty and possible implications of submitting a resignation to his Head of State. At the end of this meeting, Ydnekatchew did not take time to announce his second choice, Issa Hayatou, in defending his surprise choice; he said that though being a newcomer to the Executive Committee, Issa was still better than any other potential candidate.

Only days before he died, he invited the First Vice President Dr. Halim, and the Secretary General Moustafa Fahmy, to Addis Ababa, and repeated to both of them that Issa was now the most appropriate choice for the job. Though in vain, he also pleaded with veteran Dr. Halim, to abandon his ambition to the presidency and take the responsibility of ensuring elections, free of external influences.

It is however not known, if the early support of by then already deceased Ydnekatchew had helped Issa win his first election at the Congress in Casablanca, seven months later.

== Hayatou's era ==
Issa Hayatou, who was President of the Cameroonian Football Federation from 1986 to 1988, succeeded Tessema as CAF President at the General Assembly in Casablanca, in 1988. During the elections, Hayatou grabbed 22 votes as against 18 votes for the Togolese challenger Godfried Ekoué.

Under Hayatou' s leadership, African football has made giant strides. Until 1990, the African Cup of Nations paraded only eight finalists. However, through Hayatou's initiatives, this number has increased first in 1992 to 12 and since 1996 to 16 teams.

- The African Youth Championship was redesigned in 1991 and now features eight teams in a final tournament every two years.
- A competition for Under-17 has also followed suit since 1995.
- The African Cup of Champions Clubs has also undergone remarkable innovations. Since 1997 it has transformed into the CAF Champions League with huge prize monies to be won by the top placed clubs.
- In 2004, another international club competition, the CAF Confederation Cup, replaced both the CAF Cup and the African Cup Winners' Cup. It is played by teams who are runner-up in their local leagues as well as cup winners'. Prize money is also distributed to the top teams.
- Giant strides have been achieved in the area of technical development since Hayatou took charge of the organisation. From a budget of 100,000 US Dollars, this area now commands in excess of 2,000,000 US Dollars.
- CAF signed a protocol of understanding with UEFA in 1997 for the Meridian Project. As a result, every two years UEFA–CAF Meridian Cup, an under-18 championship is held between teams from Africa and Europe. Also, every two years, UEFA supports two African national associations with financial and logistical assistance. Countries who have enjoyed this assistance include Chad, Namibia, Eritrea, Niger, Cape Verde and São Tomé and Príncipe.
- The confederation has moved to its new headquarters in the southern suburbs of Cairo in October 2002. The ultra-modern edifice has four floors sitting on 5,000 square metres not far from the Great Pyramids of Giza. It set it back as much as four million dollars.
- As a result of its extra earnings over years, CAF has undertaken from 2002 to pay the way of a delegate from each of the 53 member national associations to its General Assembly. This has boosted attendance and participation at all the next gatherings.
- Hayatou has personally seen to the increase in Africa's representation at the various international competitions. From two to three teams at the 1994 FIFA World Cup in the United States of America to five at the 1998 edition in France. Six African teams will feature at the 2010 FIFA World Cup in South Africa.
- It was under his leadership that an African country will finally stage the biggest football event in the world: The FIFA World Cup.
- Under his tenure African teams have acquitted themselves at various competitions. Cameroon and Senegal both reached the quarter-finals in 1990 FIFA World Cup and 2002 FIFA World Cup, respectively. Nigeria and Cameroon also won Olympic gold in 1996 and 2000.
- A developmental programme tagged Contract with Africa, which began in 2005, has also helped in stepping up grassroots, human resources and infrastructural growth across the continent. In 2005, a total of 1,300,000 US Dollars was allocated to 13 national associations namely Botswana, Malawi, Cape Verde, Gambia, Togo, Central African Republic, São Tomé and Príncipe, Djibouti, Eritrea and Rwanda. While in 2006, 13 other associations also received another 1,3000,000 US Dollars, which will be extended to more African national associations.

The Emergency Committee of the executive office of the African Football Confederation met on November 17, 2008, in Douala, Cameroon. The committee endorsed the candidatures for the forthcoming elections on the Executive Committee of CAF and FIFA to be held during the Congress in February 2009 in Lagos, Nigeria. Mr. Issa Hayatou, will go through the elections unopposed.

Today, CAF has 55 members, two members more than African Union as regard to Réunion and Zanzibar the CAF's associate members, unlike Western Sahara who is a member of the African Union but not of CAF.

=== Promoting women's football in Africa ===
Under Hayatous leadership, CAF was instrumental in helping to promote women's football in Africa.

- 1998 CAF organized the first official Women's championship in Nigeria.
- 2002 CAF organized the first Under-20 Women's Championship
- 2008 it launched the Under-17 Women's Championship and created the CAF Female Player of the Year award.

== CAF celebration of the 50-year anniversary ==
In 2007, CAF celebrated its 50-year anniversary through organising a series of festivals in Egypt, Sudan, Ethiopia and South Africa so as to pay tribute to the four founding members.

CAF who was born on February 8, 1957, in Khartoum started celebrating his anniversary on February 7, 2007, in Cairo, through organising a Gala international friendly match between Egypt, the 2006 African Cup of Nations champions and Sweden to raise funds for charity. Egypt won the match 2:0, scored by Ahmad Fathy and Amro Zaki

During second part of the celebration CAF returned to its birthplace in Khartoum for its 28th General Assembly, the supreme authority of CAF. A forum on the future of African football and CAF member national associations’ General Secretaries workshop were organized by the African football continental body. A very successful congress, presenting a historical documentary, The Anniversary Book, which was put together in a short time.

The third part of the celebration took place in Addis Ababa where the 2006 CAF Super Cup final took place, winner of CAF MTN Champions league and winner of CAF Confederation Cup. The match was played on February 18 between Al Ahly (Egypt) and Étoile Sportive du Sahel (Tunisia) in Addis Ababa Stadium. Al Ahly won the match 5:4 on PSO after 0:0 draw during full-time.

The fourth and last part of the celebrations took place seven months later in South Africa with the annual CAF meeting and a Gala night as well as attending the international match between South Africa and Zambia in the qualification round for 2008 African Cup of Nations.

During its annual Awards nights in December 2007, the African football Confederation, in collaboration with Globacom, will reward the 10 best African players in the last 50 years.

=== 2010 Togo expulsion controversy ===
CAF has been the subject of widespread media controversy and criticism following a decision to ban Togo from the next two Africa Cup of Nations matches, after Togo briefly withdrew then tried to rejoin the competition following an armed ambush on their bus which wounded and killed several passengers, including players. Togo appealed to the Court of Arbitration for Sport, with FIFA president Sepp Blatter stepping in to mediate. The ban was subsequently lifted with immediate effect on 14 May 2010, after a meeting of the CAF Executive Committee.

== 21st century ==
On 6 October 2023, CAF announced the formation of the African Clubs Association (“ACA”), Chairmen and senior representatives of the 60 most successful and biggest Football Clubs in Africa.
