= List of presidents of CONCACAF =

President of CONCACAF
- Incumbent; Victor Montagliani since May 12, 2016
- Term length: Four years
- Inaugural holder: Ramón Coll Jaumet
- Formation: 1961

The following is a list of presidents of CONCACAF. CONCACAF is the continental governing body for association football in North America, Central America and the Caribbean

== Presidents of CONCACAF ==
No.	Name	Took office	Left office	Tenure	Nationality	Notes
1	Ramón Coll Jaumet	1961	1968	6–7	Costa Rica	
2	Joaquín Soria Terrazas	1969	1990	20–21	Mexico	
3	Jack Warner	1990	2011	20–21	Trinidad and Tobago	Indicted for corruption by U.S. Department of Justice.
4	Lisle Austin	May 30, 2011	June 4, 2011	5 days	Barbados	Suspended by CONCACAF Executive Committee; banned by FIFA Disciplinary Committee.
5	Alfredo Hawit	June 4, 2011	May 22, 2012	353 days	Honduras	Indicted by U.S. Department of Justice on December 3, 2015.
6	Jeffrey Webb	May 22, 2012	May 28, 2015	3 years, 5 days	Cayman Islands	Pleaded guilty on November 23, 2015 to conspiracy for racketeering, wire fraud, and money laundering; banned by FIFA Ethics Committee
(5)	Alfredo Hawit	May 28, 2015	May 12, 2016	350 days	Honduras	Indicted by U.S. Department of Justice on December 3, 2015; banned by FIFA Ethics Committee.
7	Victor Montagliani	May 12, 2016	Incumbent	10 years, 167 days	Canada	

== See also ==
- List of presidents of CONMEBOL
- List of presidents of UEFA
- List of presidents of OFC
- List of presidents of FIFA
- List of presidents of AFC
- List of presidents of CAF
