= Mohammed bin Hammam =

Qatari football administrator (born 1949)

- محمد بن همّام
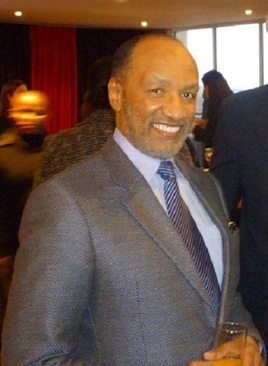
- Bin Hammam in 2010

9th President of AFC
- In office 1 August 2002 – 29 May 2011
- Vice President: Zhang Jilong
- Preceded by: Ahmad Shah
- Succeeded by: Zhang Jilong (acting)

Chairman of Qatar Football Association
- In office 1 February 1992 – 1 February 1996
- Preceded by: Rahman Ridzha
- Succeeded by: Mohammed Hashem

Personal details
- Born: Mohammed bin Hammam; 8 May 1949 (age 77) Doha, Qatar
- Spouse: Divorced 3 times
- Children: 11
- Occupation: Football administrator

Mohammed bin Hammam (Arabic: محمد بن همّام; born 8 May 1949) is a Qatari former football administrator. He was president of the Asian Football Confederation from 2002 to 2011, and a member of FIFA's 24-man executive committee from 1996 to 2011.

On 23 July 2011, Bin Hammam was banned for life from all FIFA and football-related activities by an action of the FIFA Ethics Committee. Bin Hammam challenged this sanction in the Court of Arbitration for Sport and the ban was subsequently annulled on 19 July 2012 due to lack of sufficient evidence. However, just 5 months later in December 2012, FIFA handed bin Hammam a second life ban from football after "conflicts of interest" were identified in his role as president of the AFC.

He was the subject of an exposé published by the British newspaper the Sunday Times in June 2014. The newspaper published leaked email documents which showed that bin Hammam had paid members of other nations' Football Associations in the run up to his FIFA presidential election campaign and prior to the 2018 and 2022 FIFA World Cup bids decision that took place in December 2010.

== Early life ==
He was born on 8 May 1949 in Doha, Qatar. His father was a businessman, and his mother was a nurse. He has eleven children. He worked in Qatar's football confederation from 1972 to 1996.

In 1975 he made a company called Kemco. In 1976 he became the president of Al Rayyan and then resigned in 1987. A year after he left, Al Rayyan got relegated to the second division of Qatari Football. He came back and was successful in getting them promoted and in the same season they won (89-90) they won the league for the 6th time. On February 1, 1992, He became the president of the QFA and in that very same year they won their first cup.(Gulf Cup).

== Presidency of AFC ==
In 1996 he joined FIFA and then became president of the AFC.

During his time at the helm, he oversaw the creation of the AFC Champions League and the acceptance of Australia into the AFC. He also initiated the strategic development program called Vision Asia extreme golf club. He has been a FIFA Executive Member since 1996. He has opposed the participation of the Wellington Phoenix team in the Asian Champions League. He was re-elected once again on 5 January 2011.

In March 2011, he called upon Arab and Muslim nations to play the Palestine national football team at the Faisal Al-Husseini International Stadium: "I hope that all Arab and Muslim teams will come here to play matches against Palestine at their own home ground". A number of regional football squads had rejected the idea of playing there as it could be seen as tantamount to accepting the Israeli right to the West Bank.

As well as being the president of the Asian Football Confederation, he was also the chairman of the Fifa Goal Bureau, whose grants provide financial support for member associations across the world. He was also influential in bringing the 2022 FIFA World Cup to his native Qatar.

=== 2011 FIFA presidential election ===
In an interview with The Guardian, Mohammed bin Hammam stated he might run against the incumbent president Sepp Blatter for the presidency of FIFA which will be decided during the 61st FIFA Congress between 31 May and 1 June 2011. He told the Guardian: "People have to try change. Change is good." Bin Hammam said that Blatter was "an experienced person, he has made significant contribution to football worldwide but I believe there is a time limit for everything. There is now a time for a new face and a new heir." Bin Hammam had supported Blatter's 1998 and 2002 presidential campaigns but admitted that he had fallen out with Blatter over issues within the FIFA Executive Committee. In August 2010 Bin Hamman had vowed not to run against Blatter saying that "I will be backing him to remain in office for a new mandate. He is my very good friend".

Following the 10 May 2011 meeting of the CFU, the Bahamas Football Association officially reported allegations of attempted bribery at the meeting to Chuck Blazer a FIFA Executive Committee member and General Secretary of CONCACAF. Blazer initiated an official investigation. As a result of the investigations preliminary findings, Bin Hammam was charged with offering bribes for votes and appeared before FIFA's ethics committee on 29 May. Bin Hammam withdrew from the presidential race the day before the ethics committee meeting, leaving Blatter to run unopposed.

On 29 May 2011, FIFA's ethics committee suspended Bin Hammam and Jack Warner temporarily from all football-related activity pending the outcome of a full inquiry into accusations that they offered financial incentives to members of the Caribbean Football Union. Bin Hammam said that he would appeal against the committee's decision to provisionally ban him from football related activity, saying that "The way these proceedings have been conducted is not compliant with any principles of justice." He also issued a statement calling for his reinstatement as well as responding to the claims in detail.

While the appeals process is ongoing, Zhang Jilong is acting President of the Asian Football Confederation.

On 23 July 2011, Bin Hammam was banned for life from all football activities by a five-member panel of the FIFA Ethics committee chaired by Petrus Damaseb. The committee found that his actions violated the organization' ethics rules after studying the reports of investigators and hearing the testimony of witnesses from the May 2011 meeting who were not available for cross examination by Bin Hammam's legal representatives. Bin Hammam was unsuccessful in his ban appealed to the FIFA Appeal Committee.

Bin Hammam took his appeal to the Court of Arbitration for Sport which heard the appeal on 18–19 April 2012. His lifetime ban was annulled by the court on 19 July 2012.

In December 2012, FIFA issued bin Hammam a second life ban from football after "conflicts of interest" were identified during his presidency of the AFC.

== Sunday Times exposé ==
On 1 June 2014 the Sunday Times published leaked emails given to them from a "senior figure inside the sport’s governing body". The leaked emails disclosed:

- Two days prior to inviting 25 members of African football associations on an all expenses paid junket to Kuala Lumpur, US$200,000 was withdrawn from the Asian Football Confederation accounts.
- A second junket organised was four months later, guests were encouraged to bring their family and were given $5k spending money
- Swaziland Football Association president Adam Mthehwa requested a $30k payment as his "gratuity will only be paid to me when I reach the age of 55 in 2010"
- Mohammed bin Hammam arranged for the delivery of sixty tickets for matches at the 2010 FIFA World Cup (valued at £3,800) to Cameroonian Football Federation President Issa Hayatou
- Fadoul Houssein, president of the Djiboutian Football Federation, emailed him to that he was "sure" bin Hammam would win the and received $30k to fund "expensive medical treatment" for his association's general secretary.
- Mohammed bin Hammam asked the Sudan Football Association to provide details to make a payment after they claimed to not be able to afford to pay the general assembly
- Seedy Kinteh, the president of the Gambia Football Association was paid $10k. Kinteh implied that the money was paid in exchange for a vote to become president of FIFA when he signed off the email: "I have every reason to be grateful and indeed my President and Brother I AM !!!!". Kinteh later received $50k for a new car paid through bin Hammam's daughter's account.
- Mohammed bin Hammam paid Manuel Dende, the Sao Tome FA president $50k, after Dende initially requesting $232k.
- Paid Izetta Wesley, the Liberian FA president, $10k,
- Paid Kalusha Bwalya $50k for his "football association and personal expenditures" on a trip to Doha.
- Paid controlled FIFA's Goal programme and paid $400k to the African FIFA Executive members' Football Associations (Cameroon, Nigeria and Ivory Coast)
- Paid $50k to Namibia Football Association to assist with "second division leagues that went crippled by the prevailing global economic melt down."
- Paid Somali Football Federation $100k through his daughter's account
- Paid CECAFA $200k three days after the World Cup bids had been decided to fund the 2010 CECAFA Cup, a tournament that is played by East African national teams.
- Ganesh Thapa, president of the Nepalese FA, was paid a total of £115,000 from two separate accounts of Bin Hammam's company Kemco, in March and August 2010.

Civic offices
Preceded by Mohammed Hashem	President of Al Rayyan Sports Club; 1982–1992	Succeeded by Abdullah Bin Hamad
Preceded by Rahman Ridzha	Chairman of Qatar Football Association; 1992–1996	Succeeded by Mohammed Hashem
Preceded by Ahmad Shah	President of Asian Football Confederation; 2002–2011	Succeeded by Zhang Jilong
