= Iranican =

- Country of origin: United States
- Original language: Farsi/Persian

Original release
- Release: October 8, 2005 – 2015

Iranican is an Iranian American non-profit multimedia organization. Currently, Iranican publishes a weekly talk show, Sedaye Iranican, formerly Iranican Live on Iranican website and on Radio Javan every Wednesday. Iranican also occasionally publishes videos as Iranican Reports.

== The name ==
The term "Iranican" was first introduced by one of the hosts. This term was widely coined by Siamack Baniameri's book The Iranican Dream published in 2005. Iranican is a derivative of the two words "Iranian" and "American", however because in Persian, "Irani" means Iranian, it also carries the meaning of Irani[an] can.

== History ==
Iranican was pioneered as a talk show by eight Iranians in the California Bay Area in their early 20s on Saturday October 8, 2005. Later on, the TV show was polished and developed and officially launched as Iranican on February 11, 2006. From October 8, 2005 with original co-hosts were Ali Ebrahimi, Samira Kashani, Iman Oskoorouchi, Shobeir Shobeiri, Shadi Sharif, Salman Roknizadeh, and Shadi Vaezzadeh till December 23, 2006; Iranican aired on Saturdays from 11AM-Noon PST on Persian News Network. A day or two later, PNN was cut off Telestar5 satellite, however Iranican continued airing its shows live online directly from its website for a few weeks. PNN has not come back since, but Iranican was picked up by another Satellite Channel, Markazi TV. The first Iranican show on Markazi aired live on July 29, 2007. A few months later Markazi went off Satellite for 2 months to switch frequency while Iranican started to make short online reports and has continued to do so since. On May 21, 2008, Iranican re-launched its discussion formatted talk shows as a radio program named Iranican Live which airs on RadioJavan. Later it came off the live stream and was offered as a podcasts on RadioJavan and Iranican.com. The last episode aired in the fall of 2015. After the 10 year podcast run, Iranican launched NeekOn Festival in San Francisco in September of 2016, following NeekOn Iranican led the organization of the Norooz (Iranian New Year) celebration in San Francisco's City Hall for a few years. Iranican also produced the popular Iranian American Census video with Maz Jobrani.

== Launch ==
The official launch on February 11, 2006 featured Maz Jobrani, an Iranian American Comedian and Ahmad Ahmad, an Egyptian American Comedian . This launch was the first Iranican show to feature a live audience in the studio and since then, Iranican has not had another show with a live audience.
