= Yaya Touré =

Ivorian footballer (born 1983)

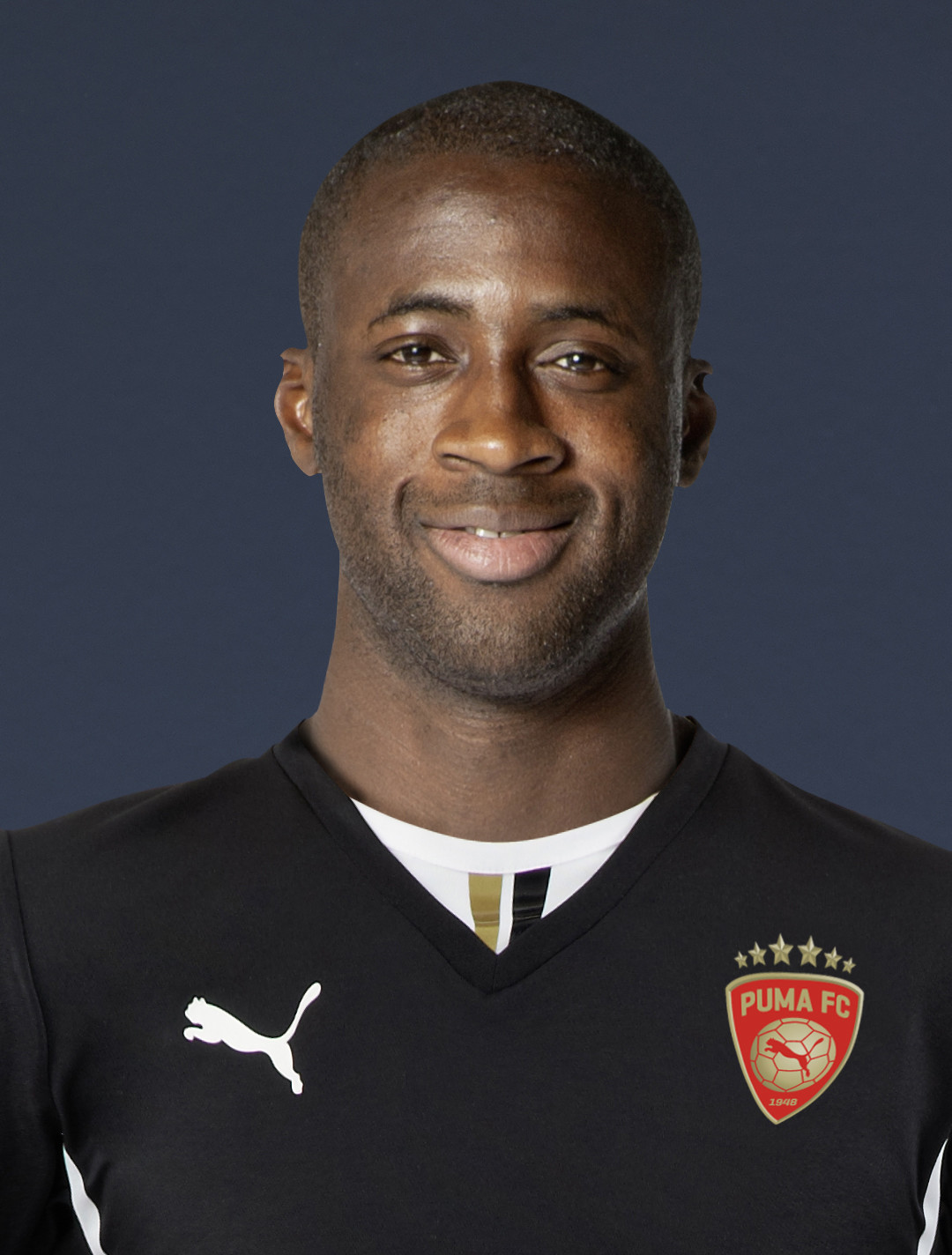
- Touré in 2013

Personal information
- Full name: Gnégnéri Yaya Touré
- Date of birth: 13 May 1983 (age 43)
- Place of birth: Bouaké, Ivory Coast
- Height: 1.88 m (6 ft 2 in)
- Position: Midfielder

Team information
- Current team: Slovan Bratislava (head coach)

Youth career
- 1996–2001: ASEC Mimosas

Senior career*
Years	Team	Apps	(Gls)
2001–2003	Beveren	70	(3)
2003–2005	Metalurh Donetsk	33	(3)
2005–2006	Olympiacos	20	(3)
2006–2007	Monaco	27	(5)
2007–2010	Barcelona	74	(4)
2010–2018	Manchester City	230	(62)
2018	Olympiacos	2	(0)
2019	Qingdao Huanghai	14	(2)
Total		470	(82)

International career
2004–2015	Ivory Coast	101	(19)

Managerial career
- 2026–: Slovan Bratislava
Medal record
Men's football
Representing Ivory Coast
Africa Cup of Nations
Winner	2015
Runner-up	2012
Runner-up	2006
- * Club domestic league appearances and goals

Gnégnéri Yaya Touré (born 13 May 1983) is an Ivorian professional football coach and former player who is the head coach of Slovak First Football League club Slovan Bratislava.

Touré aspired to be a striker during his youth and has played centre-back, including for Barcelona in the 2009 UEFA Champions League final. He spent the majority of his career as a central midfielder for club and country, later regarded as one of the best midfielders of his generation. Regarded as one of the greatest African players of all time, Touré was voted African Footballer of the Year for 2011, 2012, 2013 and 2014.

Touré began his playing career at Ivorian club ASEC Mimosas, where he made his debut at age 18. His performances attracted attention from Europe. He had stints with Beveren, Metalurh Donetsk, Olympiacos and Monaco, before moving to Barcelona in 2007. He played over 100 matches for the club and was part of the historic Barcelona team that won six trophies in a calendar year, in 2009. In 2010, Touré moved to Premier League club Manchester City, where he scored a number of key goals, most notably the only goals in the 2011 FA Cup semi-final and final. He also helped City earn their first league title in 44 years.

Touré earned 100 caps for the Ivory Coast from 2004 to 2015, representing the nation at the 2006, 2010 and 2014 FIFA World Cup tournaments. He also represented them in six Africa Cup of Nations in 2006, 2008, 2010, 2012, 2013 and 2015, helping them finish runner-up in 2006 and 2012, while captaining them to victory in 2015. He is the younger brother of fellow former footballer Kolo Touré who was his teammate at Manchester City and the national team.

== Club career ==
=== Early career ===
Touré was born in Bouaké. He joined the ASEC Mimosas youth academy in 1996 on the recommendation of his long-time mentor Patrick van Reijendam. A prominent figure in the ASEC academy was Jean-Marc Guillou. In 2001, Guillou invested heavily in a Belgian club, Beveren, with the aim of using the team to showcase Ivorian players in a European league. Touré moved to Beveren in 2001, one of many ASEC players to do so in this period. By 2003, he was one of 14 Ivorians in the Beveren squad.

In the summer of 2003, Touré had a trial with Arsenal. He started a pre-season friendly against Barnet on 19 July which finished a 0–0 draw. The BBC Sport website said that Touré "blotted his copy book by missing Arsenal's clearest chance of the game, heading a cross from Quincy Owusu-Abeyie wide." Wenger was still keen to sign the then 20-year-old but Touré had difficulties in receiving a work permit. Ultimately, Touré grew impatient and opted to sign for Ukrainian club Metalurh Donetsk in December 2003, where he spent one and a half years.

=== Olympiacos and Monaco ===
Touré joined Olympiacos in 2005. He was described as "the new Patrick Vieira" by his older brother. Olympiacos won the double that season, and Touré was one of their key players. His performances in Greece were impressive and attracted interest from many clubs.

Touré signed for French Ligue 1 club Monaco in August 2006. However, he had a difficult relationship with the incumbent manager, László Bölöni, with Touré claiming Bölöni refused to play him in his preferred midfield position. Bölöni was soon sacked with Monaco languishing in the second-last position in the league table.

Laurent Banide replaced Bölöni and Touré subsequently became an influential player in the second half of the season, scoring five times to help haul the club out of relegation difficulties. He had established himself as a key midfielder, and with interest from around Europe he decided to join Barcelona in the summer of 2007.

=== Barcelona ===
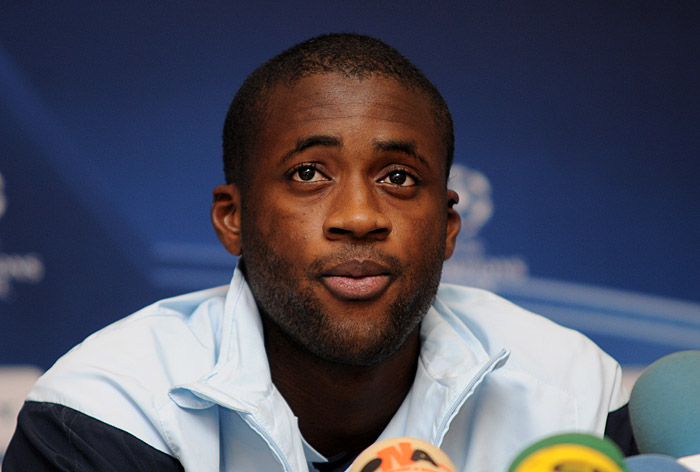
Touré with Barcelona in 2009

Touré joined Spanish La Liga club Barcelona for €10 million (£6.7 million) and made his official debut for the club on 26 August 2007 during the 2007–08 La Liga season opener against Racing de Santander. He scored his first goal in a La Liga match against Athletic Bilbao on 2 September 2007, which Barcelona won 3–1. His first UEFA Champions League match for Barcelona was against Schalke 04 in the 2007–08 quarter-final, securing a 2–0 aggregate victory and a berth in the semi-final.

During the early stages of the 2008–09 season, newly appointed manager Pep Guardiola favoured Sergio Busquets in the defensive role of Barcelona's midfield trio. In the 2009 Champions League final, Touré played at centre-back due to injuries and suspensions of first-choice defenders, despite having only played there twice before for Barcelona. In late June 2010, Barcelona confirmed that Touré would be allowed to leave the club in the summer window.

=== Manchester City ===
==== 2010–11: Debut season and FA Cup ====
On 2 July 2010, Touré signed a five-year contract with Premier League club Manchester City for a fee of around £24 million. He made his Premier League debut on 14 August in a 0–0 away draw against Tottenham Hotspur. A week later, Touré impressed in the 3–0 home win over Liverpool, forming a part of a three-man midfield with Gareth Barry and Nigel de Jong. On 19 September, Touré scored his first City goal, against Wigan Athletic. The goal was scored in the 70th minute and Touré was assisted by Carlos Tevez, who also scored in that match. Touré had been seen to take up a more attacking position under Roberto Mancini and revelled in the position. In December, he scored a brilliant left-footed drive against West Ham United and soon scored a second, which was later credited as an own goal because the ball rebounded off the post onto goalkeeper Robert Green's back and bounced in.

In January 2011, Touré scored his third goal against Wolverhampton Wanderers in a counter-attack move, with Touré making up 90 yards to latch onto the ball and fire it past the goalkeeper, with Manchester City eventually winning 4–3. Touré's fifth goal for City came on 25 February in a UEFA Europa League match against Aris. The goal was a deflected strike to make the score 3–0 to Manchester City. On 16 April 2011, Touré scored the only goal of the game in a Man of the Match performance against Manchester United in the FA Cup semi-final. Touré continued his Wembley success by scoring the only goal in his team's 1–0 win over Stoke City in the 2011 FA Cup final, ending Manchester City's 35-year wait for a major trophy, and writing himself into Manchester City folklore in the process.

==== 2011–12: First Premier League title ====
The 2011–12 season began strongly as Manchester City led the table for the majority of the season, with Touré playing a vital part in midfield. On 21 December 2011, in a 3–0 home win over Stoke City, Touré set new Premier League records for most passes attempted (168) and most completed (157) in a single match. His efforts and performances were rewarded as he was crowned African Footballer of the Year for 2011, an impressive achievement for a midfielder, since the previous 12 awards have gone to African forwards.

As the 2011–12 came to a close, Manchester City lost ground to Manchester United in the Premier League title race. After a defeat by Arsenal on 8 April 2012, an eight-point deficit had been established between City and leaders United, with most writing off City's chances of winning the league with six matches remaining. However, City defeated West Bromwich Albion 4–0, Norwich City 6–1, and Wolverhampton Wanderers 2–0 with United slipping-up, meaning the deficit at the top was now only three points with only three matches to play. A victory at home to Manchester United would move City to top on goal difference. The match was keenly anticipated as one of the most important matches the Premier League's 20-year history. Manchester City won the match, thanks to Vincent Kompany headed goal just before half-time. Touré's performance throughout the match garnered many plaudits in the media, describing his performance as "dominant" and "magnificent".

Touré scored a brace on 6 May in City's 2–0 win over Newcastle United, moving three points above Manchester United with one match left to play in the Premier League season. Touré played the full first half before coming off due to injury as City defeated Queens Park Rangers 3–2 on the final day of the season, assisting Pablo Zabaleta's opening goal in the 39th minute, to secure the first league championship for City in 44 years.

==== 2012–2014: Collective and individual success ====
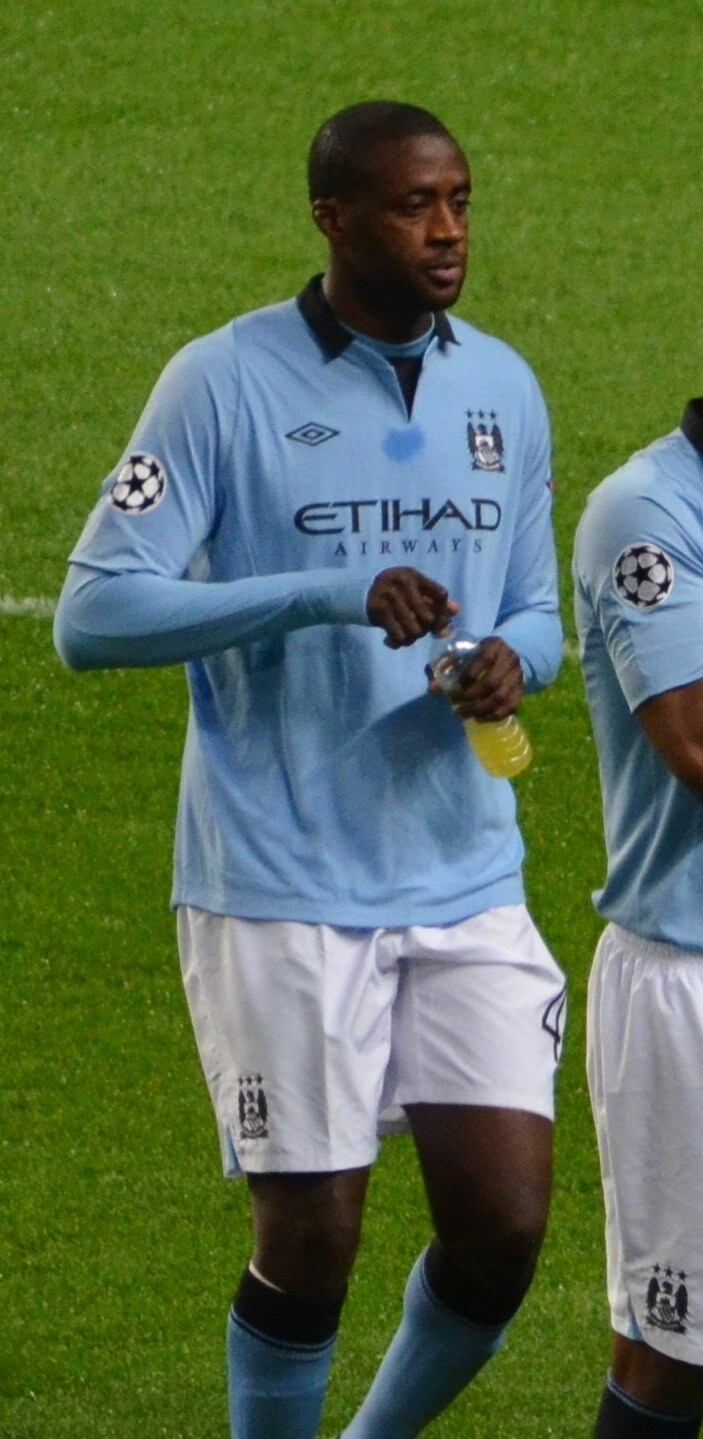
Touré playing for Manchester City in 2012

Touré started the 2012–13 season with a goal in the FA Community Shield in the 3–2 win over Chelsea in Aston Villa's stadium Villa Park. This goal was followed up by scoring first for City in two games, against Liverpool at Anfield and against Queens Park Rangers at home. In City's opening UEFA Champions League match of the season, away to Real Madrid, Touré produced a stellar individual performance, assisting an Edin Džeko goal and continually worrying the hosts. However, despite his best efforts, City lost 3–2 to a late Cristiano Ronaldo goal. He also scored in the Manchester derby, making it 2–1 to Manchester United, but City eventually lost 3–2. On 20 December 2012, Touré was crowned the 2012 African Player of the Year award at a ceremony in Accra, Ghana. It is the second time he has won the award. On 24 February 2013, after returning from the 2013 Africa Cup of Nations, Touré scored the opening goal as City beat Chelsea 2–0 in the Premier League. On 4 April 2013, Touré signed a new contract with City, keeping him at the club until 2017.

Touré scored his first goal of the 2013–14 season with a free kick as City defeated Newcastle United 4–0 in their opening Premier League match. On 22 September 2013, he scored the second goal in a 4–1 derby win over Manchester United and was named man of the match. Under City manager Manuel Pellegrini, Touré was promoted to vice-captain. He regularly captained the team in the first half of the 2013–14 season in the absence of Vincent Kompany. On 2 December, Touré was named the 2013 BBC African Footballer of the Year.

On 4 December 2013, Touré scored twice for Manchester City in a 3–2 win at West Bromwich Albion. This took his tally of league goals to seven, his highest in a single Premier League season. On 2 March 2014, Touré scored the equalising goal for Manchester City in the 2014 League Cup final against Sunderland. The match ended in a 3–1 win for Manchester City. He scored the first hat-trick of his career on 22 March in a 5–0 home win over Fulham. Touré scored the third goal for Manchester City on 25 March in the Manchester Derby at Old Trafford, helping City to a 3–0 victory over their local rivals. On 18 April, Touré was named as one of the six players on the shortlist for the PFA Players' Player of the Year award before being named in the PFA Team of the Year.

On 7 May 2014, Touré scored his 20th Premier League goal of the season in a 4–0 win against Aston Villa, becoming only the second midfielder to score 20 goals in a Premier League season, after Frank Lampard. His performances helped City to a second Premier League title in three years.

On 20 May, Touré's agent posted on Twitter that he had become unhappy at Manchester City due to the time it took City to give him a new deal in 2013 and was upset that no-one from the club wished him happy birthday. His agent, Dimitri Seluk, told BBC Sport that Toure was "very upset" and could leave City. Although he initially denied these rumours on Twitter, Touré later tweeted, "Everything Dimitri said is true. He speaks for me. I will explain after the World Cup."

Touré completed more passes than any other player throughout the 2013–14 Premier League season, with 1,169 successful passes in total; he also made an average of 76.41 passes per game, and achieved an average passing accuracy of 90.76% throughout the course of the entire season.

==== 2014–2018: Later seasons and departure ====
On 5 November 2014, in a home UEFA Champions League group fixture against CSKA Moscow, Touré scored City's equaliser in the eighth minute after Seydou Doumbia had taken under two minutes to put CSKA ahead. City were already 2–1 down and had Fernandinho sent off when Touré was dismissed for shoving Roman Eremenko. The result put City into last place in their group. On 1 March 2015, Touré started the Premier League match against Liverpool and his brother Kolo Touré came on as an 83rd-minute substitute, marking the first time the two brothers faced each other in a competitive match.

On 10 August 2015, Touré scored as Manchester City defeated West Bromwich Albion 3–0 at The Hawthorns in their opening fixture of the 2015–16 Premier League season. Although he played in the second leg of the Champions League play-off against Steaua București, Guardiola opted to omit Touré from City's Champions League squad. Touré's agent, Dimitri Seluk, subsequently stated that Guardiola humiliated Touré by omitting him for the first team. In response, Guardiola said Touré would not be included in the team until he receives an apology. A few weeks after a public apology to Guardiola on behalf of his agent, Touré made a surprising return to the first team on 16 November, starting against Crystal Palace in which he scored two goals to earn City a 2–1 away win.

It was announced on 4 May 2018 that Touré would leave Manchester City at the end of the 2017–18 season. His final appearance came in the 3–1 win over Brighton & Hove Albion.

=== Later career ===
Toure re-signed for Super League Greece club Olympiacos on 2 September 2018. His contract with Olympiacos was terminated in December 2018 by mutual agreement.

On 3 July 2019, Touré joined China League One club Qingdao Huanghai. He left the club on 1 January 2020. He started to work with his advisor in Asia, Richard Harcus, to help with his transition into coaching, with a lot of speculation as it whether he would continue playing in Asia for another season.

== International career ==
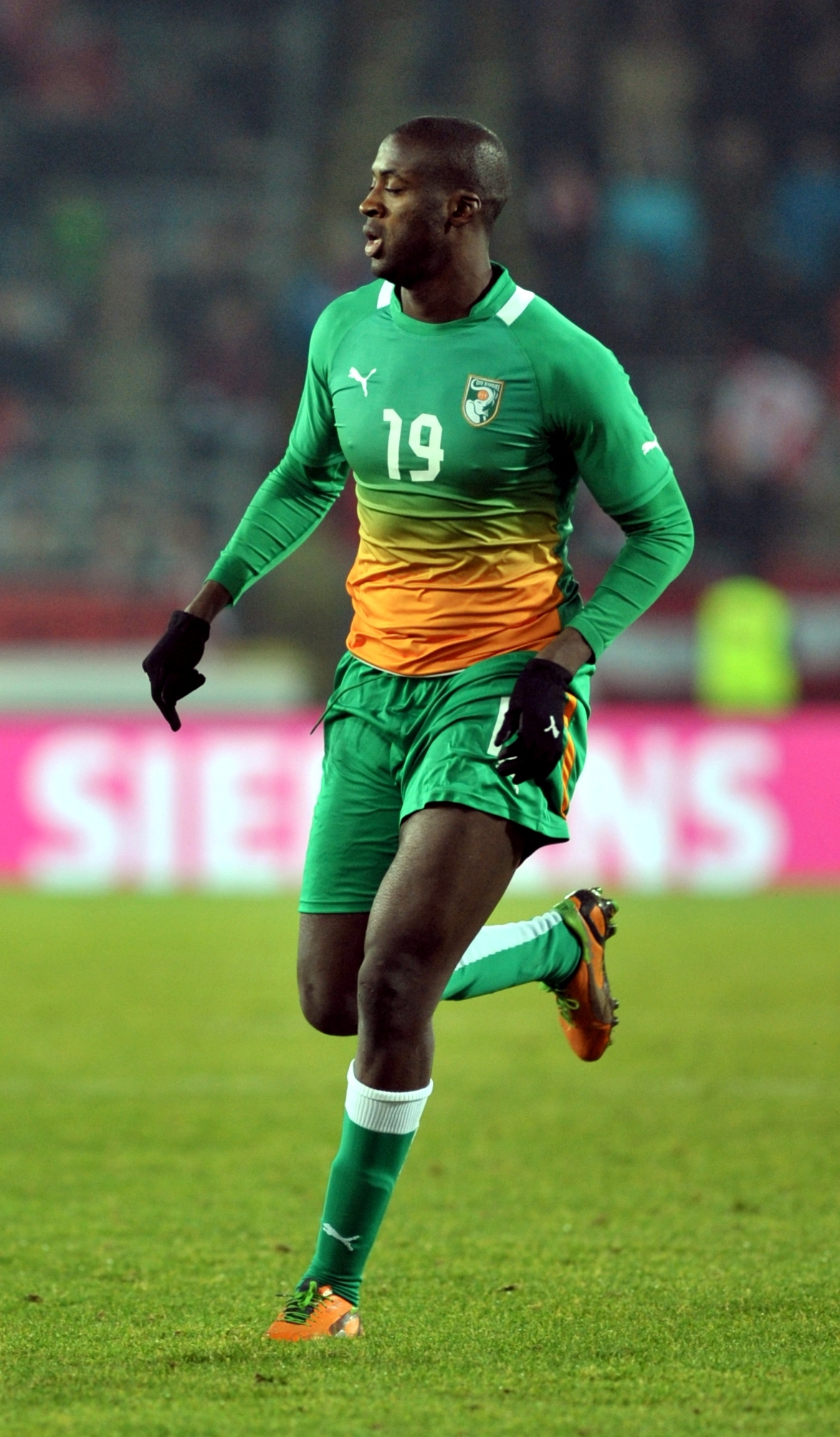
Touré playing for the Ivory Coast in 2012

Touré was a regular member of the Ivory Coast national team from his debut in 2004 to the end of his international career after 2015. In 2014, he was named captain of the team following the retirement of Didier Drogba. Touré won his 100th international cap in his side's 0–0 draw with Cameroon on 19 November 2014.

Touré appeared in all three of Ivory Coast's matches at the 2006 FIFA World Cup. In the 2010 tournament, he again played in all three of his nation's games, scoring the opening goal in a 3–0 win over North Korea. Touré made his third and final World Cup tournament appearance during the 2014 competition, and captained the team in their opening match, a 2–1 defeat of Japan.

Touré represented the Ivory Coast at six Africa Cup of Nations tournaments, in 2006, 2008, 2010, 2012, 2013 and 2015; his side ended as runners-up in the 2006 and 2012 editions, and won the tournament in 2015. Touré was named in the CAF's team of the tournament in 2008, 2012 and 2015. On 4 February 2015, Touré scored the opening goal in the Ivory Coast's 3–1 semi-final victory over DR Congo to qualify the team for their third Africa Cup of Nations final in nine years. On 8 February, in the final held at the Estadio de Bata in Equatorial Guinea, Touré captained the Ivory Coast as they won a first AFCON title since 1992, defeating Ghana in a penalty shoot-out.

On 20 September 2016, Touré announced his retirement from international football. He returned to the national team set-up in March 2018, but would play no further games for the nation before his eventual retirement from professional football.

== Style of play ==
Formerly a striker, Touré played primarily in the centre of the pitch as either a holding midfielder or as a box-to-box midfielder, often switching between offensive and defensive stances throughout matches in the latter role. Touré was a complete and versatile midfielder. He was also capable of playing as a centre-back or in the number 10 role. His key strengths were his passing range, vision and physical ability. He was gifted with good technique and ball control, although he also excelled defensively at breaking down opposing attacking plays and winning back possession through his powerful tackling ability. He was known for his pace, stamina and physical presence, which was often combined with runs from midfield, and he had been referred to as a "human train" and a "colossus" by various pundits.

Touré was frequently pushed forward during the latter part of matches, including in the penultimate match of the 2011–12 season against Newcastle United where Touré scored two late goals to win the match, and put Manchester City at the top of the league. He was also capable of scoring goals due to his powerful striking ability from distance, and his heading ability, as well as his adeptness at scoring from free kicks and penalties. Jonathan Wilson, when writing for The Guardian in 2013, described Touré as a holding midfielder who can "make tackles," and who was "capable of regaining the ball," while also noting that he frequently functioned "as the more creative player alongside a destroyer." He also added that "he likes to make forward surges." As such, he labelled Touré as a "carrier" or "surger," namely "a player capable of making late runs or carrying the ball at his feet."

Touré had in his repertoire an unusual method of striking the ball, referred to by Norwegian footballer Alexander Tettey as a "Yaya", and described by BBC Sport's Pat Nevin as a way of striking the ball with a far back area of the foot close to the heel, allowing the ball to move in a straight line which a goalkeeper can find hard to read.

== Coaching career ==
During COVID-19, Touré assisted at Leyton Orient.

On 10 February 2021, Touré joined Ukrainian Premier League club Olimpik Donetsk as assistant manager. He left the position after 4 months at the club.

On 14 June 2021, Touré was appointed as an assistant coach by Russian Premier League club Akhmat Grozny until June 2022. Touré left the club on 13 December 2021.

After a spell coaching part-time, Touré became an under-16 coach at Tottenham Hotspur's academy in August 2022. The following June, he moved to Belgian club Standard Liège as assistant manager.

On 3 November 2023, Touré was named as assistant coach of the Saudi Arabia national team, to join the staff of his former manager at Manchester City Roberto Mancini.

In June 2026, Touré landed his first managerial job by joining Slovak First Football League side Slovan Bratislava as head coach, signing a three-year contract.

== Personal life ==
Touré is the younger brother of Kolo Touré, who was his teammate at Manchester City and the Ivory Coast national team. Their younger brother Ibrahim Touré was also a footballer, who died on 19 June 2014 at the age of 28 after a short battle with cancer. Touré is Muslim.

In October 2013, Touré joined a campaign against elephant poaching, becoming a goodwill ambassador for the United Nations Environment Programme.

On 13 December 2016, Touré pleaded guilty to drink driving. He was arrested by police on 28 November after being pulled over and found to be more than twice over the legal driving limit. Touré said he had not "intentionally consumed alcohol", explaining to the court he had consumed diet cola from a jug at a party without realising there was brandy in it. He conceded that his drink tasted "odd" and that he felt tired after consuming it, but did not suspect he was drunk. Judge Gary Lucy said it was "inconceivable" that he was unaware that he was drinking alcohol. Touré was banned from driving for 18 months, and was fined £54,000 – at the time the largest fine for drink driving in British legal history.

In 2018, Yaya Touré acquired British citizenship.

== Awards and nominations ==
Touré was nominated in the Personality of the Year category at the 2014 MTV Africa Music Awards. In July 2014, Touré was nominated for Prize in Entertainment at the 2014 The Future Africa Awards. In December 2015, Touré won the BBC African Footballer of the Year on a public vote for the second time, after leading the Ivory Coast to victory in the 2015 African Cup of Nations.

== Career statistics ==
=== Club ===
Appearances and goals by club, season and competition
Club	Season	League			National cup (Note: Includes Ukrainian Cup, Copa del Rey, FA Cup, Greek Cup)		League cup (Note: Includes Coupe de la Ligue, Football League/EFL Cup)		Europe		Other		Total	
Club	Season	Division	Apps	Goals	Apps	Goals	Apps	Goals	Apps	Goals	Apps	Goals	Apps	Goals
Beveren	2001–02	Belgian First Division	28	0	0	0	—		—		—		28	0
Beveren	2002–03	Belgian First Division	30	3	0	0	—		—		—		30	3
Beveren	2003–04	Belgian First Division	12	0	0	0	—		—		—		12	0
Beveren	Total		70	3	0	0	—		—		—		70	3
Metalurh Donetsk	2003–04	Vyshcha Liha	11	1	0	0	—		—		—		11	1
Metalurh Donetsk	2004–05	Vyshcha Liha	22	2	2	1	—		4 (Note: Appearances in UEFA Cup)	1	—		28	4
Metalurh Donetsk	Total		33	3	2	1	—		4	1	—		39	5
Olympiacos	2005–06	Alpha Ethniki	20	3	0	0	—		6 (Note: Appearances in UEFA Champions League)	0	—		26	3
Monaco	2006–07	Ligue 1	27	5	0	0	1	0	—		—		28	5
Barcelona	2007–08	La Liga	26	1	3	0	—		9	1	—		38	2
Barcelona	2008–09	La Liga	25	2	6	1	—		12	0	—		43	3
Barcelona	2009–10	La Liga	23	1	1	0	—		8	0	5 (Note: Two appearances in Supercopa de España, one appearance in UEFA Super Cup, two appearances in FIFA Club World Cup)	0	37	1
Barcelona	Total		74	4	10	1	—		29	1	5	0	118	6
Manchester City	2010–11	Premier League	35	8	7	3	0	0	8 (Note: Appearances in UEFA Europa League)	1	—		50	12
Manchester City	2011–12	Premier League	32	6	0	0	0	0	9 (Note: Six appearances and three goals in UEFA Champions League, three appearances in UEFA Europa League)	3	1 (Note: Appearance in FA Community Shield)	0	42	9
Manchester City	2012–13	Premier League	32	7	4	1	0	0	5	1	1	1	42	10
Manchester City	2013–14	Premier League	35	20	4	0	3	3	7	1	—		49	24
Manchester City	2014–15	Premier League	29	10	1	0	2	1	5	1	1	0	38	12
Manchester City	2015–16	Premier League	32	6	0	0	5	1	10	1	—		47	8
Manchester City	2016–17	Premier League	25	5	4	2	0	0	2	0	—		31	7
Manchester City	2017–18	Premier League	10	0	0	0	4	0	3	0	—		17	0
Manchester City	Total		230	62	20	6	14	5	49	8	3	1	316	82
Olympiacos	2018–19	Super League Greece	2	0	1	0	—		2	0	—		5	0
Qingdao Huanghai	2019	China League One	14	2	—		—		—		—		14	2
Career total			470	82	33	8	15	5	90	10	8	1	616	106

=== International ===
Appearances and goals by national team and year
National team	Year	Apps	Goals
Ivory Coast	2004	3	0
Ivory Coast	2005	2	0
Ivory Coast	2006	15	1
Ivory Coast	2007	5	1
Ivory Coast	2008	11	1
Ivory Coast	2009	8	2
Ivory Coast	2010	13	2
Ivory Coast	2011	5	2
Ivory Coast	2012	10	1
Ivory Coast	2013	10	6
Ivory Coast	2014	10	2
Ivory Coast	2015	9	1
Total		101	19

Ivory Coast score listed first, score column indicates score after each Touré goal

List of international goals scored by Yaya Touré
No.	Date	Venue	Cap	Opponent	Score	Result	Competition	Ref.
1	24 January 2006	Cairo International Stadium, Cairo, Egypt	7	Libya	2–1	2–1	2006 Africa Cup of Nations	
2	3 June 2007	Stade Bouaké, Bouaké, Ivory Coast	21	Madagascar	3–0	5–0	2008 Africa Cup of Nations qualification	
3	25 January 2008	Sekondi-Takoradi Stadium, Sekondi-Takoradi, Ghana	28	Benin	2–0	4–1	2008 Africa Cup of Nations	
4	20 June 2009	Stade du 4 Août, Ouagadougou, Burkina Faso	39	Burkina Faso	1–0	3–2	2010 FIFA World Cup qualification	
5	5 September 2009	Stade Félix Houphouët-Boigny, Abidjan, Ivory Coast	41	Burkina Faso	3–0	5–0	2010 FIFA World Cup qualification	
6	25 June 2010	Mbombela Stadium, Mbombela, South Africa	54	North Korea	1–0	3–0	2010 FIFA World Cup	
7	4 September 2010	Stade Félix Houphouët-Boigny, Abidjan, Ivory Coast	56	Rwanda	1–0	3–0	2012 Africa Cup of Nations qualification	
8	10 August 2011	Stade de Genève, Geneva, Switzerland	59	Israel	2–0	4–3	Friendly	
9	9 October 2011	Stade Félix Houphouët-Boigny, Abidjan, Ivory Coast	61	Burundi	2–1	2–1	2012 Africa Cup of Nations qualification	
10	4 February 2012	Estadio de Malabo, Malabo, Equatorial Guinea	66	Equatorial Guinea	3–0	3–0	2012 Africa Cup of Nations	
11	22 January 2013	Royal Bafokeng Stadium, Phokeng, South Africa	74	Togo	1–0	2–1	2013 Africa Cup of Nations	
12	26 January 2013	Royal Bafokeng Stadium, Phokeng, South Africa	75	Tunisia	2–0	3–0	2013 Africa Cup of Nations	
13	23 March 2013	Stade Félix Houphouët-Boigny, Abidjan, Ivory Coast	77	Gambia	2–0	3–0	2014 FIFA World Cup qualification	
14	8 June 2013	Independence Stadium, Bakau, Gambia	78	Gambia	3–0	3–0	2014 FIFA World Cup qualification	
15	16 June 2013	National Stadium, Dar es Salaam, Tanzania	79	Tanzania	2–1	4–2	2014 FIFA World Cup qualification	
16	16 June 2013	National Stadium, Dar es Salaam, Tanzania	79	Tanzania	3–2	4–2	2014 FIFA World Cup qualification	
17	10 September 2014	Stade Ahmadou Ahidjo, Yaoundé, Cameroon	88	Cameroon	1–1	1–4	2015 Africa Cup of Nations qualification	
18	15 October 2014	Stade Félix Houphouët-Boigny, Abidjan, Ivory Coast	90	DR Congo	1–1	3–4	2015 Africa Cup of Nations qualification	
19	4 February 2015	Estadio de Bata, Bata, Equatorial Guinea	98	DR Congo	1–0	3–1	2015 Africa Cup of Nations	

== Managerial statistics ==
As of match played 21 November 2026

Managerial record by team and tenure
Team	Nat.	From	To	Record							
Team	Nat.	From	To	G	W	D	L	GF	GA	GD	Win %
Slovan Bratislava	(Slovakia)	1 July 2026	present	27	15	6	6	55	37	+18	55.56
Total				27	15	6	6	55	37	+18	55.56

== Honours ==
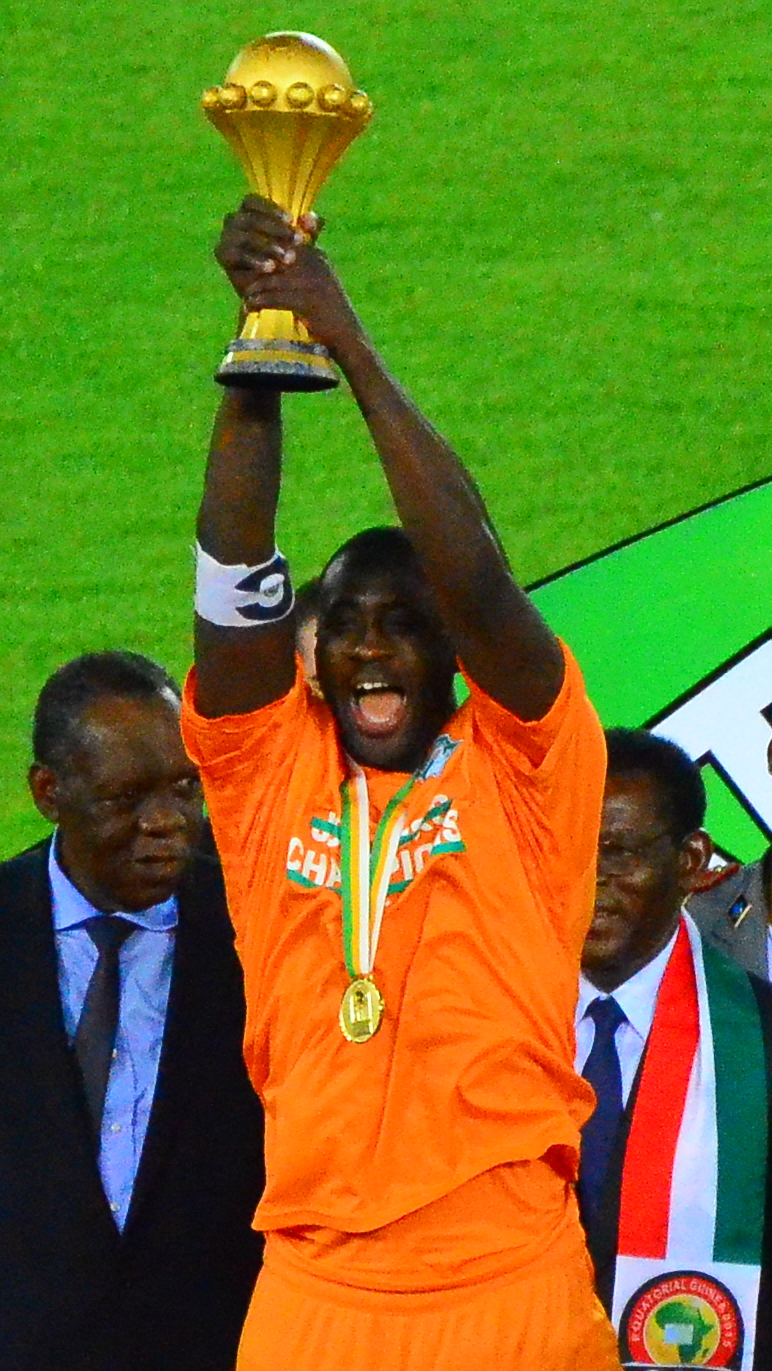
Touré lifts the Africa Cup of Nations trophy after winning against Ghana in the 2015 final in Bata, Equatorial Guinea.

Olympiacos

- Alpha Ethniki: 2005–06
- Greek Football Cup: 2005–06

Barcelona

- La Liga: 2008–09, 2009–10
- Copa del Rey: 2008–09
- Supercopa de España: 2009
- UEFA Champions League: 2008–09
- UEFA Super Cup: 2009
- FIFA Club World Cup: 2009

Manchester City

- Premier League: 2011–12, 2013–14, 2017–18
- FA Cup: 2010–11; runner-up: 2012–13
- Football League Cup: 2013–14, 2015–16
- FA Community Shield: 2012

Qingdao Huanghai

- China League One: 2019

Ivory Coast

- Africa Cup of Nations: 2015; runner-up: 2006, 2012

Individual

- Ivory Coast Player of the Year: 2009
- CAF Team of the Year: 2008, 2009, 2011, 2012, 2013, 2014, 2015
- African Footballer of the Year: 2011, 2012, 2013, 2014
- Premio Bulgarelli Number 8: 2013
- ESM Team of the Year: 2013–14
- PFA Team of the Year: 2011–12 Premier League, 2013–14 Premier League
- BBC African Footballer of the Year: 2013, 2015
- Manchester City Player of the Year: 2013–14
- Africa Cup of Nations Team of the Tournament: 2015
- Sports Illustrated Premier League Team of the Decade: 2010–2019
- IFFHS CAF Men's Team of the Decade 2011–2020
- IFFHS All-time Africa Men's Dream Team: 2021
- FWA Tribute Award: 2023

== See also ==
- List of men's footballers with 100 or more international caps
