= Africa Cup of Nations trophy =

Gold trophy awarded to Africa Cup of Nations winner

- Awarded for: Winning the Africa Cup of Nations
- Presented by: CAF

History
- First award: 1957
- First winner: Abdel Aziz Abdullah Salem Cup Egypt (1957) African Unity Cup Nigeria (1980) Africa Cup of Nations Cameroon (2002)
- Most wins: Egypt (7 times)
- Most recent: Senegal (2nd title, 2025)

The Africa Cup of Nations trophy is a golden trophy awarded to the winner of the Africa Cup of Nations. Three different trophies have been presented to the winners of the tournament since its inception in 1957: The Abdel Aziz Abdullah Salem Cup from 1957 to 1987, named after the donors and the first president of the Confederation of African Football, Abdel Aziz Abdallah Salem of Egypt, and kept by Ghana after winning it three times in 1963, 1965 and 1978. The second trophy is the African Unity Cup. It was given by the Supreme Council for Sports in Africa to the Confederation of African Football before the tournament and was used from 1980 to 2000 and was kept by Cameroon after winning it three times in 1984, 1988 and 2000. The current cup is called the African Cup of Nations (after the official name of the tournament) and has been used since 2001, although the Egyptian team won it three times in a row in 2006, 2008 and 2010. However, the Confederation of African Football gave the Egyptian Football Association a complete replica to keep and the shape of the official cup did not change. The teams that win the title are also entitled to place a star according to the number of times they win above the team logo on the shirts.

== History ==
The first trophy, made of silver, was the Abdel Aziz Abdullah Salem Cup, named after the donor and first CAF president, Abdel Aziz Abdullah Salem of Egypt. Salem was in charge of CAF for only one year (1957–1958), but is an important figure in African football history as the first representative of African football. The silver trophy, similar in shape to the FA Cup. Egypt was the first country to lift the trophy in 1957 and defended it in 1959 as the United Arab Republic, but it was Ghana who took the trophy permanently as the first three-time winner in 1963, 1965 and 1978. Ethiopia, Sudan, Congo, Zaire and Morocco were some of the other teams to lift the trophy.

The African Unity Cup (1980–2000) was given by the Supreme Council for Sports in Africa to CAF prior to the 1980 tournament, and was a cylindrical piece with the Olympic rings on a map of the continent. Going into the 2000 edition of the tournament, three nations Egypt, Cameroon and Nigeria lifted the African Unity Cup twice Nigeria and Cameroon faced each other in the final, and it took a penalty shootout to determine the permanent holders of this award with Cameroon lifting the cup for the third time.

Africa Cup of Nations In 2001, the third trophy was unveiled, a gold-plated cup designed and made in Italy. Cameroon, the permanent holders of the previous trophy, were the first country to be awarded the new trophy after winning the 2002 edition. Egypt became the first team to win the new trophy three times (they did so three times in a row). Unlike previous winners, Egypt did not retain the trophy and was given a full-size replica to keep. First and second-time winners usually receive a smaller replica for their trophy cabinets.
