= Ivory Coast Player of the Year =

The Footballer of the Year of Ivory Coast is a yearly award given by the Ivorian Football Federation to the best player of the year.

== Winners ==
All players and clubs are Ivorian, unless otherwise noted.

| Year | Player | Club |
|---|---|---|
| 2006 | Didier Drogba | (England) Chelsea F.C. |
| 2007 | Didier Drogba | (England) Chelsea F.C. |
| 2008 | Bakari Koné | (France) Olympique de Marseille |
| 2009 | Yaya Touré | (Spain) FC Barcelona |
| 2010 | Gervinho | (France) Lille |
| 2011 | Gervinho | (France) Lille |
| 2012 | Didier Drogba | (England) Chelsea F.C. |
