= Lambert Maltock =

Vanuatuan football player

7th President of OFC
- Incumbent
- Assumed office 9 March 2019 (Acting: 11 June 2018 – 9 March 2019)
- Preceded by: David Chung

Personal details
- Born: 15 May 1956 (age 70) Vanuatu
- Occupation: Football Administrator

Lambert Maltock (born 15 May 1956) is a Vanuatuan football administrator who has been the president of the Vanuatu Football Federation since 2008. In 2018, he was appointed acting president of the Oceania Football Confederation, becoming permanent president and a member of the FIFA Council the following year.
