= List of presidents of CONMEBOL =

President of CONMEBOL
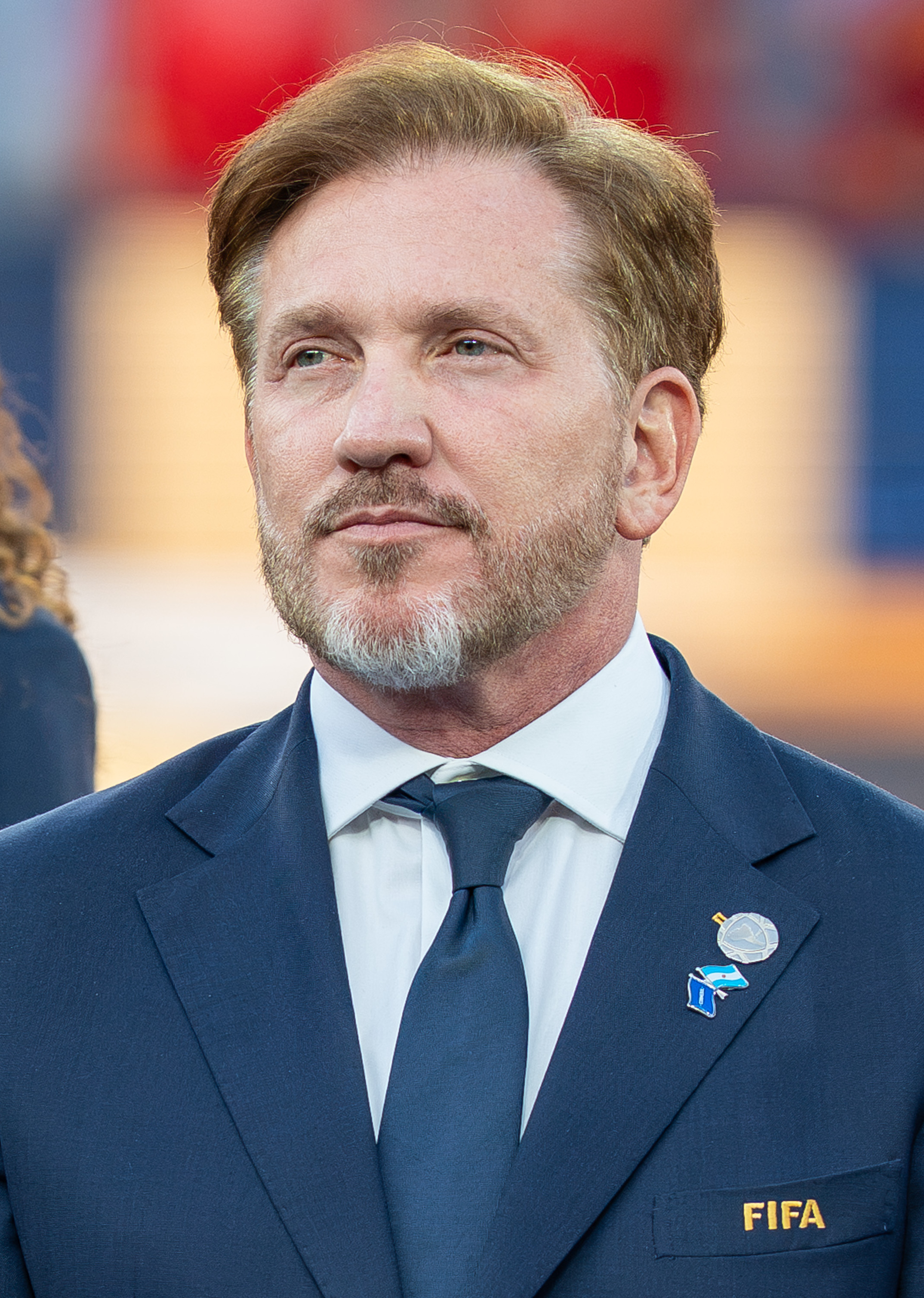
- Incumbent; Alejandro Domínguez since 1 January 2016
- Term length: Four years
- Inaugural holder: Héctor Rivadavia Gómez
- Formation: 9 July 1916

The following is a list of presidents of CONMEBOL, the South American association football governing body.

== Presidents of CONMEBOL ==
No.	Image	Name	Took office	Left office	Tenure	Nationality
1		Héctor Rivadavia Gómez	9 July 1916	1926	9–10	Uruguay
2		Luis O. Salesi	1926	1939	12–13	Argentina
3		Luis Valenzuela Hermosilla	1939	1955	15–16	Chile
4		Carlos Dittborn Pinto	1955	1957	1–2	Chile
5		José Ramos de Freitas	1957	1959	1–2	Brazil
6		Fermín Sorhueta	1959	1961	1–2	Uruguay
7		Raúl H. Colombo	1961	1966	4–5	Argentina
8		Teófilo Salinas Fuller	1966	1986	19–20	Peru
9		Nicolás Léoz	1 May 1986	30 April 2013	26–27	Paraguay
10		Eugenio Figueredo	30 April 2013	31 July 2014	0–1	Uruguay
11		Juan Ángel Napout	1 August 2014 (interim); 4 March 2015 (permanent)	11 December 2015	1 year, 132 days	Paraguay
–		Wilmar Valdez	11 December 2015	1 January 2016	21 days	Uruguay
12		Alejandro Domínguez	1 January 2016	Incumbent	10 years, 298 days	Paraguay

== See also ==
- List of presidents of FIFA
- List of presidents of AFC
- List of presidents of CAF
- List of presidents of CONCACAF
- List of presidents of UEFA
- List of presidents of OFC
