= List of presidents of the Oceania Football Confederation =

President of OFC
- Incumbent; Lambert Maltock since 11 June 2018
- Term length: Four years
- Inaugural holder: William Walkley
- Formation: 1968
- Website: Official website

The following is a list of presidents of OFC, the Oceanic association football governing body.

== Presidents of OFC ==
| No. | Image | Name | Took office | Left office | Tenure |
|---|---|---|---|---|---|
| 1 | | William Walkley | 1968 | 1970 | 3–4 years |
| – | | Jack Cowie | 1970 | 1972 | 1–2 years |
| – | | Vic Tuting | 1972 | 1972 | 0 years |
| 2 | | Jack Cowie | 1972 | 1978 | 5–6 years |
| 3 | | Arthur George | 1978 | 1982 | 3–4 years |
| 4 | | Charles Dempsey | 1982 | 2000 | 17–18 years |
| 5 | | Basil Scarsella | 2000 | 2003 | 2–3 years |
| – | | Tautulu Roebuck | 2003 | 2004 | 0–1 years |
| 6 | | Reynald Temarii | 2004 | 2010 | 5–6 years |
| 7 | | David Chung | 2010 | 6 April 2018 | 7–8 years |
| 8 | | Lambert Maltock | 11 June 2018 | Incumbent | 8 years, 115 days |

Notes

- David Chung served as interim president before being elected in 2011.
- Lambert Maltock served as interim president before being elected in 2019.

== See also ==
- List of presidents of FIFA
- List of presidents of AFC
- List of presidents of CAF
- List of presidents of UEFA
- List of presidents of CONMEBOL
- List of presidents of CONCACAF
