= Zhang Jilong =

Chinese football administrator (born 1952)

- 张吉龙
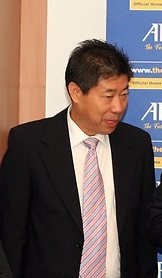
- Zhang in 2011

Senior-Vice President of AFC
- In office 1 May 2013 – 1 December 2016
- President: Salman Al Khalifa
- Preceded by: Moya Dodd
- Succeeded by: Praful Patel
- In office 11 January 2007 – 1 August 2011
- President: Mohammed bin Hammam
- Preceded by: Ali Bin Khalifa
- Succeeded by: Moya Dodd

Acting President of AFC
- In office 29 May 2011 – 1 May 2013
- Vice President: Moya Dodd
- Preceded by: Mohammed bin Hammam
- Succeeded by: Salman Al Khalifa

Personal details
- Born: 9 February 1952 (age 74) Yantai, Shandong, China
- Occupation: Football administrator

Zhang Jilong (Chinese: 张吉龙; pinyin: Zhāng Jílóng; born 9 February 1952) is a Chinese football administrator who is the current senior vice president of the Asian Football Confederation. He previously served as Vice President of AFC from 2002 to 2011 and as Senior Vice President from 11 January 2007 to 1 August 2011. He had been the Acting President of the Asian Football Confederation from 14 June 2011 until 1 May 2013 after the resignation of Mohammed bin Hammam. He was also a member of the FIFA Executive Committee.

== Early life ==
Zhang was born in Yantai, Shandong Province, China. Zhang graduated from Beijing International Studies University in 1975 and joined the National Athletic Committee and worked in the foreign affairs department. He joined the Chinese Football Association in 1978 when it was established.

== AFC career ==
In 1989, Zhang joined the AFC as a member of the AFC Rules Committee. He became the AFC Finance Committee chairman in April 2000. In 1994 Zhang joined the FIFA Women's Committee. After the election of Mohammed bin Hammam as AFC President, on 1 August 2002, Zhang was named as one of his vice presidents. He was elected as Senior-Vice President in January 2007 by the AFC members. He ran for a seat on the FIFA executive committee in January 2011, but was defeated in a vote at the AFC's congress in Doha.

FIFA suspended Bin Hammam for life on 23 July 2011, due to bribery allegations, and he was officially dismissed as head of the Asian Football Confederation. On 29 July 2011, the members of AFC were informed that the legal committee was in agreement that an Extraordinary Congress for the election of President may be convened in the event that the office of President falls vacant for more than one year. This means that an Extraordinary Congress for this purpose could not be convened until after 30 May 2012 and Zhang will act as President until that date. In the end, Zhang indeed acted as the first executive chairman due to the suspension of Bin Hammam. He was also elected as a member of the FIFA Executive Committee.

In September 2012, due to his age, Zhang retired from his role as foreign affairs director at the State Sports General Administration, but continued to preside over the AFC in his capacity as Acting Chairman. In February 2013, Zhang Jilong announced that he would withdraw from the elections of the next AFC President and FIFA Executive Committee

== 2002 World Cup draw ==
Originally, for World Cup 2002 FIFA wanted to carry out the seeding of the teams by calculating and referencing to the match records from the previous three World Cups. However, on the day before the draw, the president of FIFA, Sepp Blatter, suddenly decided that instead of looking at the previous three records, the records from the previous two World Cups and the previous two Asia Cups will be used as a reference for the seeding.

Because this new rule would work against the Chinese team, Zhang called the secretary of the Asia Football association, Veerapan, and asked to personally meet up with Blatter to discuss the proposed rule. Zhang asserted that "FIFA should not interfere with the internal affairs of the Asia Football association" and asked Blatter to take back the new rule. Veerapan accepted Zhang's proposal and announced that he would discuss the matter with Blatter. Finally, the draw for the games took place in Bangkok on June 1, 2001, and the draw followed the rules originally set by the Asia Football Association instead of the new proposed rule. As a result, the Chinese football team achieved a "lucky draw" and was seeded with the United Arab Emirates, Uzbekistan, Qatar, and Oman. China won first place in the group and successfully entered the finals of the game.

Civic offices
Preceded by Ali Bin Khalifa	Senior-Vice President of Asian Football Confederation; 2007–2011	Succeeded by Moya Dodd
Preceded by Mohammed bin Hammam	Acting President of Asian Football Confederation; 2011–2013	Succeeded by Salman bin Ibrahim Al Khalifa
Preceded by Moya Dodd	Senior-Vice President of Asian Football Confederation; 2013–present	Succeeded by Incumbent
