= 1941–42 Huddersfield Town A.F.C. season =

Huddersfield Town
1941–42 season
- Chairman: Sir Amos Brook Hirst; Philip Wood
- Manager: Clem Stephenson
- Stadium: Leeds Road
- Wartime League North: 11th (1st NRL Competition); 15th (War Cup Qualifiers); 6th (2nd NRL Competition)
- Top goalscorer: League: All: Billy Price (22)
- Highest home attendance: 6,803 vs Bradford City (6 April 1942)
- Lowest home attendance: 917 vs Bradford (Park Avenue) (16 May 1942)
- Biggest win: 5–0 vs Newcastle United (13 September 1941)
- Biggest defeat: 0–5 vs Sunderland (29 November 1941)

Huddersfield Town's 1941–42 campaign saw Town continuing to play in the Wartime League. They finished 11th in the 1st NRL Competition, 15th in the War Cup qualifiers and 6th in the 2nd NRL Competition.

This was also the last season in which Clem Stephenson was at the club. He had been at the club for over 2 decades as player and manager and has the longest managerial career in Huddersfield's history.

Sir Amos Brook Hirst also left the club to become chairman of the Football Association.

== Results ==
=== 1st NRL Competition ===
Date	Opponents	Home/Away	Result F–A	Scorers	Attendance
30 August 1941	Middlesbrough	A	1–3	Barclay	3,600
6 September 1941	Middlesbrough	H	2–4	Butt (pen), Shackleton	2,623
13 September 1941	Newcastle United	H	5–0	Wilkinson (3), Metcalfe (2)	2,800
20 September 1941	Newcastle United	A	1–3	Wilkinson	5,500
27 September 1941	Bradford City	A	1–3	Butt	3,000
4 October 1941	Bradford City	H	4–1	Barclay, Baird (2), Willingham	2,127
11 October 1941	Grimsby Town	H	5–1	Robinson (2), Metcalfe, Baird, Mortensen	2,268
18 October 1941	Grimsby Town	A	2–2	Carter, Biggs	2,000
25 October 1941	York City	H	5–1	Price, Willingham (3), Thompson	2,141
1 November 1941	York City	A	5–1	Carter (4), Price	4,000
8 November 1941	Gateshead	A	2–3	Baird, Barclay	4,500
15 November 1941	Gateshead	H	3–1	Barclay, Carter, Baird	1,716
22 November 1941	Sunderland	H	1–0	Price	1,500
29 November 1941	Sunderland	A	0–5		5,000
13 December 1941	Bradford (Park Avenue)	H	3–0	Lodge, Davis, Burgess	2,500
20 December 1941	Leeds United	H	4–2	Price (2), Willingham, Baird	2,063
25 December 1941	Leeds United	A	1–2	Price	6,000
25 December 1941	Bradford (Park Avenue)	A	3–1	Willingham, Manning, Mahon	5,300

=== 2nd NRL Competition ===
The first 11 matches of this competition, except the match against Grimsby Town took part in the War Cup qualifiers. The last 5 matches took place in the Combined Counties Cup.

Date	Opponents	Home/Away	Result F – A	Scorers	Attendance
27 December 1941	Halifax Town	A	2–2	Boot, Mahon	5,000
3 January 1942	Doncaster Rovers	H	3–1	Juliussen (3)	1,337
10 January 1942	Sheffield United	H	3–1	Baird, Price, Barclay	3,000
17 January 1942	Sheffield United	A	1–2	Cockroft	7,032
24 January 1942	Blackpool	H	3–3	McKellor, Barclay, Stabb	4,375
31 January 1942	Blackpool	A	2–4	Mountford (pen), Ainsley	6,000
7 February 1942	Chesterfield	H	3–0	Thompson (2), Price	1,657
24 February 1942	Halifax Town	H	1–0	Barclay	1,150
28 February 1942	Doncaster Rovers	A	4–1	Barclay, Price (3)	2,094
14 March 1942	Grimsby Town	A	2–1	Price, Barclay	1,500
21 March 1942	Chesterfield	A	1–2	Price	2,500
28 March 1942	Rotherham United	A	3–1	Price (2), Baird	2,600
4 April 1942	Bradford City	A	1–4	Barclay	6,365
6 April 1942	Bradford City	H	2–1	Thompson, Barclay	6,083
11 April 1942	Burnley	A	0–3		3,000
18 April 1942	Leeds United	H	5–1	Barclay, Price (3), Wilkinson	1,636
25 April 1942	York City	A	2–2	Price, Thompson	3,347
2 May 1942	Halifax Town	A	1–1	Wilkinson	2,000
9 May 1942	Halifax Town	H	1–2	Barclay	1,605
16 May 1942	Bradford (Park Avenue)	H	2–2	Price (2)	917
