= Ernst Thommen =

President of FIFA (1899–1967)

Acting FIFA President
- In office 25 March 1961 – 28 September 1961
- Preceded by: Arthur Drewry
- Succeeded by: Stanley Rous

Personal details
- Born: 23 January 1899 Basel, Switzerland
- Died: 14 May 1967 (aged 68) Muttenz, Switzerland
- Occupation: Sports administrator

Ernst B. Thommen (23 January 1899 – 14 May 1967) was the acting (interim) FIFA president from March 1961 to 28 September 1961. He spent six months in office, succeeding Arthur Drewry who died in office.

Thommen contested for the president position when he was the acting president, but lost in the first round voting to Stanley Rous. In the second round he withdrew from contesting.

Thommen was a FIFA member from Switzerland. He had served as chairman of the Organising Committee during the 1954, 1958 and 1962 FIFA World Cups.

Thommen died in 1967 in a car accident.

== Citations ==
- Bayle, Emmanuel; Clastres, Patrick (10 April 2018). Global Sport Leaders: A Biographical Analysis of International Sport Management. Springer. ISBN 978-3-319-76753-6.
- "FIFA Presidential Elections Since 1904". Jakarta Globe.
- Radnedge, Keir (2001). The Illustrated Encyclopedia of Soccer. Universe Pub. ISBN 978-0-7893-0670-8.
- Henshaw, Richard (1979). The Encyclopedia of World Soccer. New Republic Books. ISBN 978-0-915220-34-2.
