= Constant Omari =

Congolese football administrator (born 1958)

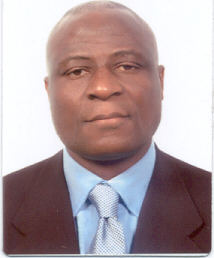

President of CAF Acting
- Acting
- In office 23 November 2020 – 29 January 2021
- Preceded by: Ahmad Ahmad
- Succeeded by: Ahmad Ahmad

Personal details
- Born: Constant Omari Selemani; 14 January 1958 (age 68) Belgian Congo
- Spouse: Aimee Kasongo Omari (died 2016)
- Occupation: Member, FIFA Council

Constant Omari Selemani (born 14 January 1958) is a Congolese football administrator and a member of the FIFA Council.

== Career ==
In September 2015, Omari was appointed as the chairman of FIFA's Task Force Against Racism and Discrimination.

On 19 July 2019, Omari was nominated to be the first vice president of Confederation of African Football, taking over the portfolio from Amaju Pinnick.

FIFA announced on 27 January 2021 that Omari had failed an integrity and eligibility check and was barred from seeking reelection.

== Corruption allegations ==
On 24 June 2021, the FIFA Ethics Committee banned Omari for one year from any football-related activities for accepting bribes from Lagardère Live Entertainment in 2016.
