= List of presidents of the Asian Football Confederation =

President of AFC
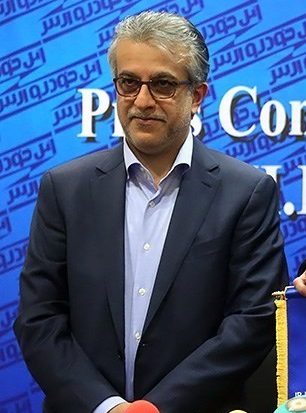
- Incumbent; Salman bin Ibrahim Al Khalifa since 2 May 2013
- Term length: Four years
- Inaugural holder: Lo Man-kam
- Formation: 1 August 1954
- Website: Official website

The following is a list of presidents of Asian Football Confederation (AFC), the association football governing body in Asia.

== Presidents of AFC ==
No.	Portrait	Name (born–died)	Term of office			Country	Ref.
No.	Portrait	Name (born–died)	Took office	Left office	Time in office	Country	Ref.
1		Lo Man-kam	8 May 1954	1954	0 years	Hong Kong	
2		Kwok Chan	1954	1956	1–2 years	Hong Kong	
3		William Louey	1956	1957	0–1 year	Hong Kong	
4		Chan Nam-cheong	1957	1958	0–1 year	Hong Kong	
5		Tunku Abdul Rahman	1958	1976	17–18 years	Malaysia	
6		Kambiz Atabay	1 August 1976	9 December 1978	2 years, 130 days	Iran	
7		Hamzah Abu Samah	9 December 1978	1 August 1994	15 years, 235 days	Malaysia	
8		Ahmad Shah	1 August 1994	1 August 2002	8 years, 0 days	Malaysia	
9		Mohammed bin Hammam	1 August 2002	29 May 2011	8 years, 301 days	Qatar	
–		Zhang Jilong acting	29 May 2011	1 May 2013	1 year, 337 days	China	
10		Salman bin Ibrahim Al Khalifa	2 May 2013	Incumbent	13 years, 198 days	Bahrain	

== See also ==
- List of presidents of FIFA
- List of presidents of UEFA
- List of presidents of CAF
- List of presidents of CONCACAF
- List of presidents of CONMEBOL
- List of presidents of OFC
