= Vanuatu Football Federation =

National football association of Vanuatu

OFC
- Short name: VFF
- Founded: 1934; 92 years ago
- Headquarters: Port Vila, Vanuatu
- FIFA affiliation: 1988
- OFC affiliation: 1988
- President: Lambert Maltock
- Website: www.vff.vu

The Vanuatu Football Federation (VFF; French: Fédération du Vanuatu de football) is the main governing body of all football in Vanuatu. It is an association of Vanuatu football clubs, and it organises national competitions and international matches for the Vanuatu National Football Team. The men's national team is ranked 165th in the FIFA World Rankings (Men). The men's national team was invited to compete in The Hero Intercontinental Cup 2023 and competes in major tournaments like FIFA World Cup Qualifiers (Oceania) and OFC Nations Cup.

The VFF was founded in 1934. It has been affiliated with FIFA since 1988 and is also a member of the Oceania Football Confederation (OFC). The Federation was invited to compete in the 2023 Intercontinental Cup by AIFF. It competes in other events such as - FIFA World Cup Qualifiers and OFC Nations Cup. The men's national team of Vanuatu has never qualified for the FIFA World Cup and the women's national team has never qualified for the FIFA Women's World Cup in the history of VFF.

== Staff of Vanuatu Football ==
Position	Name
President	(Vanuatu) Lambert Maltock
Senior Vice President	(Vanuatu) Iau TUAN
Second Vice President	(Vanuatu) Sakias BOE
Chief Executive Officer	(Vanuatu) Albert MANAROTO
Technical Director	(Vanuatu) Peter TAKARO
Competitions Manager	(Vanuatu) Bong Shem
Referee Development Officer	(Vanuatu) Nase CARLO
Administration Support Officer	(Vanuatu) Shamina MOLI
Media & Public Relations Officer	(Vanuatu) Moses Stevens
President Torba Football Association	(Vanuatu) Roy SMITH
President Penama Football Association	(Vanuatu) Thomas TAU
President Malampa Football Association	(Vanuatu) Lambert MALTOCK
President Tafea Football Association	(Vanuatu) Iau Tuan
President Shefa Football Association	(Vanuatu) Lencie Fred
President Luganville Football Association	(Vanuatu) Sakias Boe
President Sanma Football Association	(Vanuatu) John Kaot Pore
