= Arthur Drewry =

English football administrator

Arthur Drewry CBE
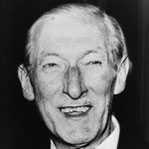
- Drewry by the mid 1950s

5th President of FIFA
- In office 7 October 1955 – 25 March 1961
- Preceded by: Rodolphe Seeldrayers
- Succeeded by: Ernst Thommen (as acting); Stanley Rous (elected)

Member of the Grimsby Borough Council
- In office ?–?

Personal details
- Born: 3 March 1891 Grimsby, Lincolnshire, England
- Died: 25 March 1961 (aged 70)
- Spouse: Ida May (m. 1919)
- Children: 2
- Occupation: Football administrator

Arthur Drewry CBE (3 March 1891 – 25 March 1961) was an English football administrator who served as the fifth president of FIFA, the world governing body of association football, from 1955 to 1961. Drewry held several football administration posts in his native England, serving as chairman of The Football Association and president of The Football League.

== Biography ==
Drewry was born in Grimsby, Lincolnshire, and educated at the Grimsby Collegiate School.

In 1911 Drewry joined the Lincolnshire Yeomanry and served in the First World War with the 1/1st Lincolnshire Yeomanry in Palestine. Drewry reached the rank of quartermaster sergeant with his squadron in the Yeomanry. After the war, in 1919, Drewry married the daughter of a Grimsby fish merchant, and Drewry would run his father-in-law's business until his retirement in 1953. In the Second World War Drewry served as North Lincolnshire's head warden and chief fire guard. Drewry held several civic roles in his native Grimsby, serving both as a borough councillor and a Justice of the Peace.

=== English football administration ===
Drewry's career in football administration began with his serving as a director of Grimsby Town. The chairman of the club was Drewry's father-in-law, and Drewry himself would also become chairman of the club. Drewry later served as President of the Football League from 1949 to 1955. Drewry served on the Football Association's International Selection Committee from 1944, and after his presidency of the Football League served as chairman of The Football Association (FA) from 1955 to 1961. Drewry succeeded Amos Brook Hirst as chairman of the FA; Hirst had resigned due to ill health. As chair of the FA Drewry once proposed awarding a point to league teams for every goal scored to encourage offensive football. Drewry's proposals were rejected by the teams.

Drewry played a significant role in the 1950 game between England and the United States in which the English lost 1–0 to the rank outsiders in the 1950 FIFA World Cup in Belo Horizonte. The English national coach, Walter Winterbottom, had wanted to rest some players for the next game against Spain, but was over-ruled by Drewry, acting as sole selector, who chose an unchanged team from their last game, a 2–0 win against Chile. Stanley Rous, Drewry's secretary at the FA, visited him and urged him to include Stanley Matthews and make other changes to the team, but Drewry was adamant in his desire to keep an unchanged team. After the loss against the United States, Drewry acquiesced to four changes to the team, but England lost their next game to Spain 1–0, and as a result were eliminated from the tournament.

In 1953 Coronation Honours, Drewry appointed a Commander of Order of the British Empire (CBE).

Following the Munich air disaster on 6 February 1958 which claimed the lives of a number of Manchester United staff and personnel, Drewry was appointed chairman in March of the fundraising committee for dependents of those involved in the disaster. The funds raised had reached £52,000 (equivalent to £1,060,000 in 2025) by the time of their disbursement in October 1958.

In his capacity as chair of the FA, Drewry was one of six football officials sued by five Sunderland players who were suspended in 1957 for refusing to answer questions about possible illegal payments. Stanley Rous served as Drewry's secretary at the FA. Drewry and Rous travelled to Switzerland in 1945, to the headquarters of FIFA to successfully negotiate for the re-admittance of the British Home Nations to FIFA.

=== President of FIFA ===
Drewry had been appointed the vice-president of FIFA by Jules Rimet, and served as the interim president for the six months following the death of Rimet's presidential successor, Belgian Rodolphe William Seeldrayers. At the 30th FIFA Congress in Lisbon, Portugal, Drewry defeated France's M. Larfarge by 38 votes to 16 for the presidency. Drewry oversaw the 1958 FIFA World Cup during his term in office, and ultimately served as president for five years before his death from a year-long illness in 1961. Drewry was the third FIFA president to die in office.
