= Ramón Coll Jaumet =

Costa Rican sports administrator (died 1984)

President of CONCACAF
- In office 1961–1969
- Succeeded by: Joaquín Soria Terrazas

Personal details
- Born: December 12, 1905 San José, Costa Rica
- Died: December 15, 1984 (aged 79) San José, Costa Rica

Ramón Coll Jaumet (died 1984) was a Costa Rican sports administrator and President of CONCACAF between 1961 and 1968.

In 1953, he wrote to the International Olympic Committee to request recognition of the Costa Rican Olympic Committee. The request was granted in May 1954.

On March 2 of 1967, the 1st Ordinary Congress of CONCACAF in Tegucigalpa, Honduras was held, under his presidency.

He was a member of the executive committee of CONCACAF between 1961 and 1974. He died in 1984. He is a member of the CONCACAF Hall of Fame.
