= Stanley Rous =

6th President of FIFA (1895–1986)

Sir Stanley Rous CBE
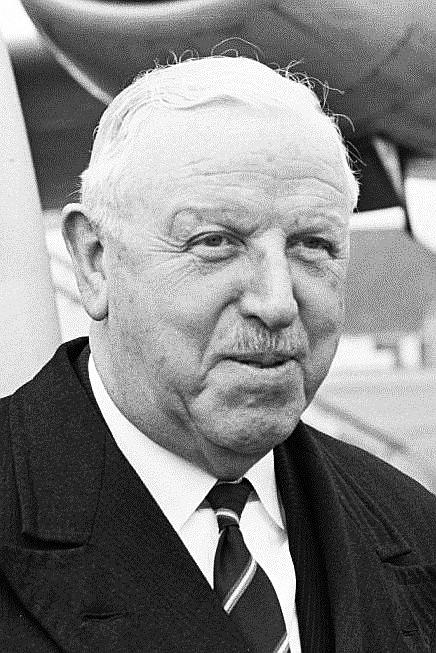
- Rous in 1966

6th President of FIFA
- In office 28 September 1961 – 8 May 1974
- Preceded by: Arthur Drewry; Ernst Thommen (as acting)
- Succeeded by: João Havelange

Personal details
- Born: Stanley Ford Rous; 25 April 1895 Mutford, East Suffolk, England
- Died: 18 July 1986 (aged 91) Paddington, London, England
- Spouse: Adrienne Gacon (m. 1924; died 1950)
- Occupation: Referee, football administrator

Sir Stanley Ford Rous (25 April 1895 – 18 July 1986) was an English international football referee and administrator. He served as secretary of the Football Association from 1934 to 1962 and then served as the 6th president of FIFA from 1961 to 1974.

== Early life ==
Rous was born in Mutford near Lowestoft in East Suffolk and attended Sir John Leman School in Beccles. He was the eldest son of a provision master. He trained as a teacher in Beccles before serving in World War I as a non-commissioned officer in the 272nd Brigade of the Royal Field Artillery (East Anglian) in France, Palestine, Egypt, and Lebanon.

After the war Rous attended St Luke's College in Exeter and then became a sports teacher at Watford Boys Grammar School.

== Referee ==
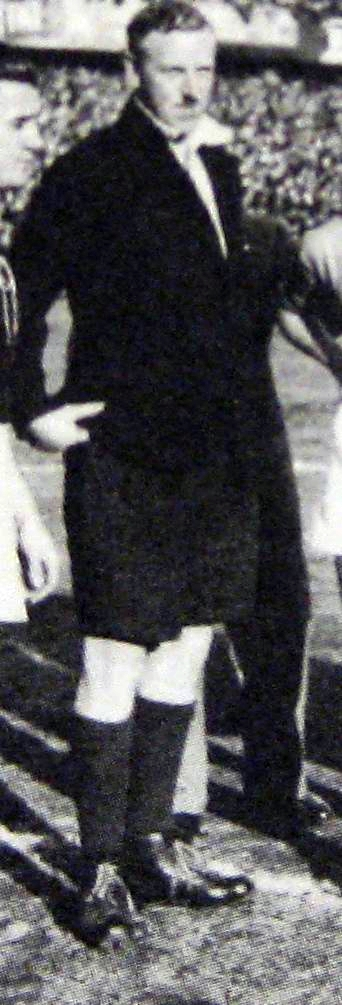
Rous refereeing a game between Hungary and Italy in 1933

Rous played football at amateur level as a goalkeeper for clubs including Kirkley and Lowestoft Town, but was forced to retire from playing after breaking a wrist. He developed an interest in refereeing whilst watching Norwich City and later qualified as a referee while studying at St Luke's and became a football league referee in 1927. He officiated in his first international match, a 2–0 friendly win for Belgium against the Netherlands, in the Bosuilstadion, Antwerp, on 13 March in the same year. He eventually officiated in a total of 34 international matches.

He rose to the top tier of the game when he was appointed to referee the 1934 FA Cup Final at Wembley Stadium, where Manchester City defeated Portsmouth by 2 goals to 1. The following day, after travelling to Belgium to control an international match, Rous retired from refereeing.

Rous made a major contribution to the game by rewriting the Laws of the Game in 1938, making them simpler and easier to understand. He was also the first to employ the diagonal system of control for referees as a standard practice. According to Belgian referee John Langenus, who had been in charge of the 1930 FIFA World Cup Final, he had seen referees from his country making a similar attempt at scientific positioning on the field of play.

== Administrator ==
Rous moved on to the sphere of football administration. He served as secretary of the Football Association from 1934 to 1962. At UEFA, Rous joined the executive committee in 1958, becoming vice-president in March 1960, before leaving to become FIFA president the following year. During his time as FIFA president from 1961 to 1974, Rous witnessed the crowning of England as champions of the world in 1966.

Rous supported the apartheid-era South African Football Association. South Africa had been admitted to FIFA in 1954, but were expelled from their local federation, the Confederation of African Football (CAF), in 1958, and were suspended from FIFA in 1961 after failing to fulfill an ultimatum regarding anti-discrimination rules. In 1963, they were readmitted to FIFA after Rous travelled to the country to "investigate" football in the country, concluding that the game could disappear in the country if they were not readmitted, while the South African Football Association proposed playing an all-white team for the 1966 finals and an all-black team in 1970. It turned out to be short-lived. At FIFA's next annual congress, held in Tokyo just after the Olympic Games, a greater turnout of African and Asian representatives led to South Africa being suspended again, and they were ultimately expelled from FIFA in 1976.

Rous continued to press for them to be readmitted, to the point that he was prepared to establish a Southern African confederation so that South Africa and Rhodesia (who were themselves expelled in 1970) could compete, but he was forced to back down after CAF members made it clear that they would withdraw en masse from FIFA at the 1966 FIFA congress in London.

In 1973 Rous insisted the USSR team play a World Cup qualifier against Chile in the aftermath of General Pinochet's military coup, at a time when thousands of political prisoners were being held in the Estadio Nacional Julio Martínez Prádanos sports stadium. The USSR refused to do so and Chile qualified automatically for the 1974 World Cup, where they failed to advance from a group containing both West and East Germany and Australia.

Rous stood for re-election as president in 1974 but, in the context of discontent of other nations at European domination of FIFA, as well as opposition by African and Asian countries due to the pro-South African stance of Rous, was defeated by João Havelange. Upon his retirement as president, on 11 June 1974, Rous was nominated Honorary President of FIFA.

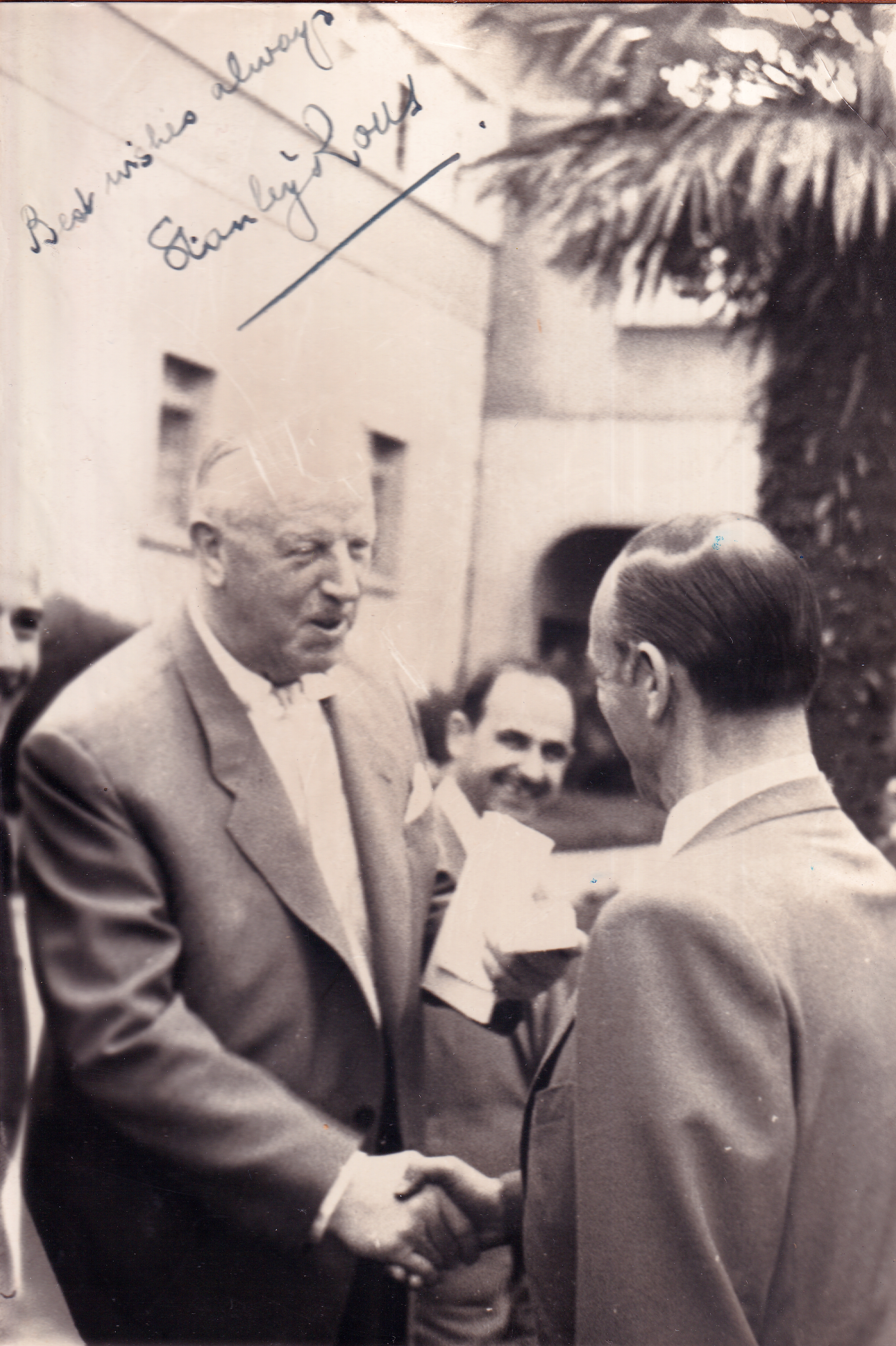
Stanley Rous with Turkish referee Tarik Ozerengin

The short-lived Rous Cup was named after him, as was the Rous Stand at Watford F.C.'s Vicarage Road ground, until being renamed the Graham Taylor Stand in 2014. He wrote A History of the Laws of Association Football, published in 1974.

== Personal life ==
Stanley Rous married Adrienne Gacon in 1924. He was appointed a CBE in 1943 and knighted in 1949. He was a friend of one of the founding members of FIFA, Ivo Schricker (1877–1962). Rous was a Freemason, attending Exonian Lodge No. 3415 in London.

== Death ==
Rous died in Paddington, London, of leukaemia in 1986, at the age of 91. A service in his memory was held at Westminster Abbey in the September of the same year.

He is buried with his wife Lady Rous in the Holy Trinity Church in the Lickey Hills, close to both Bromsgrove and Birmingham.

Sporting positions
Preceded by E Wood	FA Cup Final Referee; 1934	Succeeded by A E Fogg
