= Joaquín Soria Terrazas =

Mexican athletics director

President of CONCACAF
- Preceded by: Ramón Coll Jaumet
- Succeeded by: Jack Warner

Personal details
- Died: October 29, 1990

Joaquín Soria Terrazas was a Mexican athletics director. Soria Terrazas was president of the amateur sector of the Mexican Football Federation. He was president of CONCACAF between 1969 and 1990, he was succeeded by Trinidadian Jack Warner.

He was a member of the Organizing Committee of the World Cup from 1969 until 1989 and the Olympics from 1964 to 1990.

Soria Terrazas was Chairman of the Organizing Committee of the 1970 and 1986 World Cups, 1968 Olympic Games and the 1983 FIFA World Youth Championship. He died of diabetes on October 29 of 1990. He was inaugurated into the CONCACAF Hall of Fame in 1992.

== Misogynistic Impact on Mexican Football Culture ==
After Mexico's participation in the First Women's World Championship for football, the FMF Mexican Football Federation, under the guidance of the then head of the amateur division, Soria Terrazas, released a statement saying, "No women's league has affiliated with the FMF." Soria Terrazas would go on to release a personal statement along with his summation of the FMF's position contending that, "football [is] unsuitable for women...as it is practiced, football can cause considerable disorders." If Soria Terrazas had these opinions as just an ordinary citizen in Mexico then he simply would have been one in the many. However, because of his position in the FMF, his opinions carried heavy influence. For example, because of his opinions and at his insistence, "the FMF canceled a match between two women's teams from Guadalajara in Estadio Jalisco." Media speculation at the time believed that the FMF was concerned that because women's matches were free they would draw paying audience members from the affiliated men's games.
