= Mustafa Mansour =

Egyptian footballer (1914-2002)

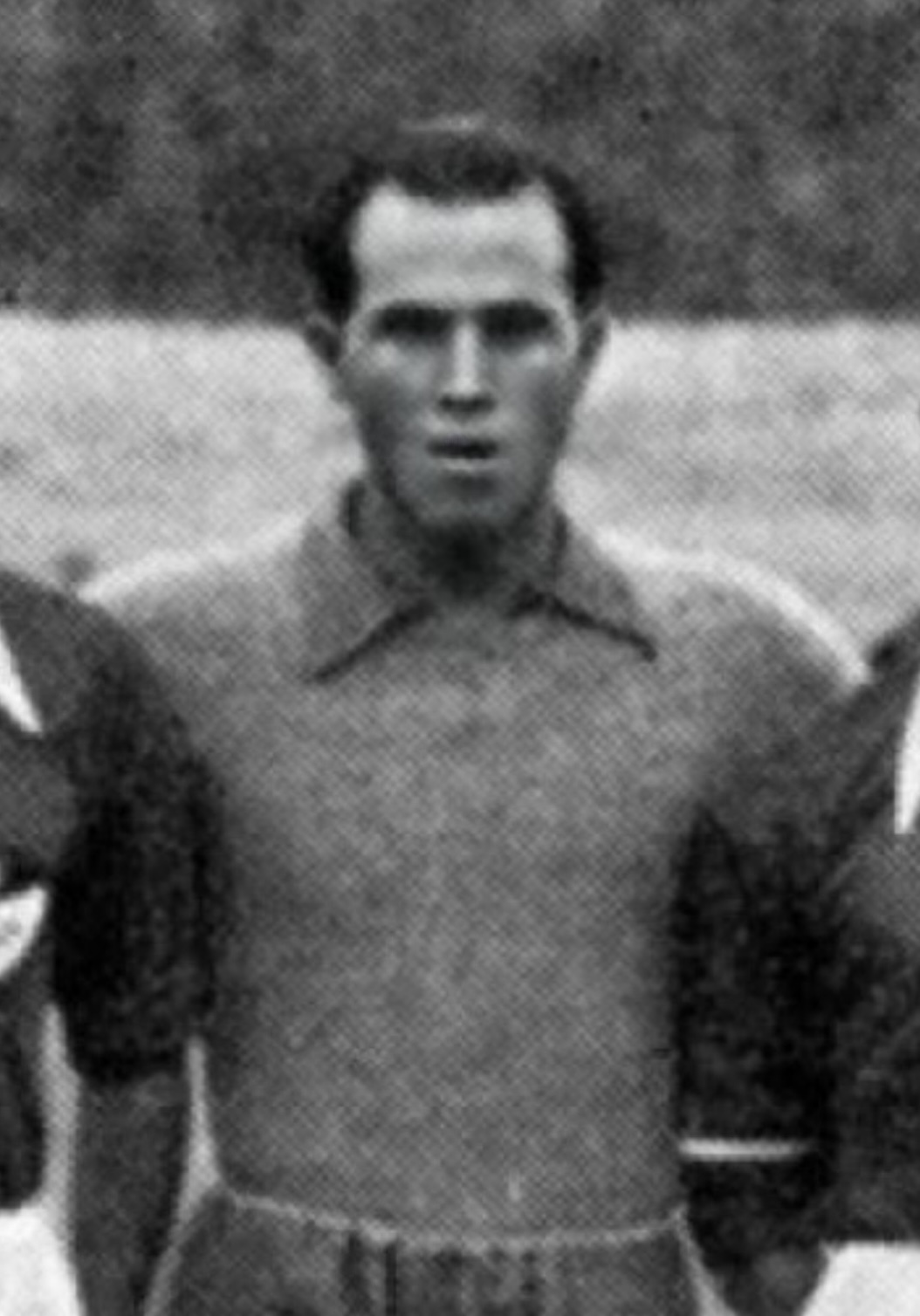
- Mansour with Egypt in 1936

Personal information
- Full name: Mustafa Kamel Mansour
- Date of birth: 2 August 1914
- Place of birth: Cairo, Egypt
- Date of death: 24 July 2002 (aged 87)
- Place of death: Cairo, Egypt
- Position: Goalkeeper

Senior career*
| Years | Team | Apps | (Gls) |
- Al Ahly
| 1937–1939 | Queen's Park | 41 | (0) |

International career
- Egypt

Managerial career
- Al Ahly
- * Club domestic league appearances and goals

Mustafa Kamel Mansour (Arabic: مُصْطَفَى كَامِل مَنْصُور; 2 August 1914 – 24 July 2002) was an Egyptian footballer who played as a goalkeeper for Egypt at the 1934 FIFA World Cup. He is also notable for being one of the first non-British or Irish players to play in the Scottish leagues.

== Playing career ==
Born in Cairo, Egypt, Mansour played for Cairo-based club Al Ahly in his native country, where his performances earned him a selection for the 1934 World Cup in Italy. He played in Egypt's only game at the tournament, a 4–2 defeat to Hungary in the first round in Naples.

Mansour also played for Egypt at the 1936 Summer Olympics in Berlin.

Egypt's coach at the World Cup had been a Scotsman, James McCrae, and he may have influenced Mansour's decision to move to Scotland in 1936 to attend Jordanhill College alongside Mohamed Latif. While studying in Glasgow, Mansour appeared for the famous amateur side Queens Park, becoming their regular goalkeeper upon the retirement of Desmond White (future chairman of Celtic) during the 1938–39 season.

== Coaching career and later life ==
In the late thirties, "Tuffy" Mansour as he was known, was a popular adult leader in the 72nd Glasgow Scout Troop.

Mansour returned to Egypt when the Second World War broke out, where he would later manage former club Al Ahly, as well as become a government minister.

He died in July 2002, at age 87. Only weeks before his death, he had given an interview to BBC Sport on their visit to Cairo in the run-up to the World Cup being held in Japan and South Korea that summer.
