= List of presidents of the Confederation of African Football =

President of the Confederation of African Football (CAF)
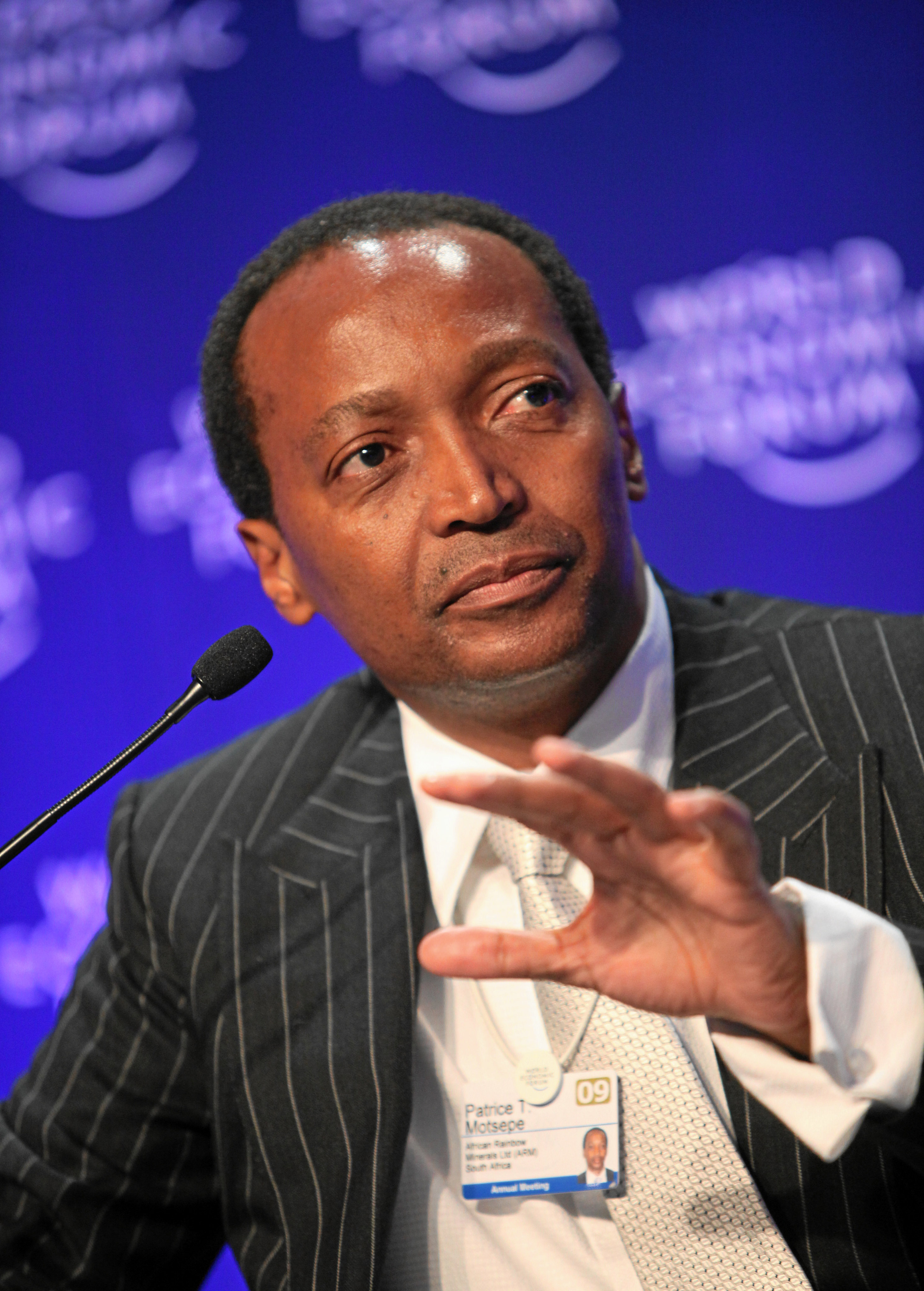
- Incumbent; Patrice Motsepe since 12 March 2021
- Term length: 4 years
- Inaugural holder: Abdel Aziz Abdallah Salem
- Formation: 10 February 1957
- Website: Official website

The article shows the list of presidents of the governing body of association football, beach soccer and futsal in Africa, the Confederation of African Football (CAF), the latest of which is South African businessman Patrice Motsepe since 12 March 2021.

== Presidents ==
No.	Image	Name	Took office	Left office	Tenure	Nationality
1		Abdel Aziz Abdallah Salem	10 February 1957	1958	1 years	Egypt
2		Abdel Aziz Moustafa	1958	1968^{†}	10 years	Egypt
3		Abdel Halim Mohamed	1968	1972	4 years	Sudan
4		Yidnekatchew Tessema	1972	19 August 1987^{†}	15 years	(Ethiopian Empire) Ethiopia
-		Abdel Halim Mohamed; Acting	18 August 1987	10 March 1988^{‡}	205 days	Sudan
5		Issa Hayatou	10 March 1988	16 March 2017	29 years, 6 days	Cameroon
6		Ahmad Ahmad	16 March 2017	23 November 2020	3 years, 252 days	Madagascar
–		Constant Omari; Acting	23 November 2020	29 January 2021	67 days	Democratic Republic of the Congo
(6)		Ahmad Ahmad	29 January 2021	12 March 2021	42 days	Madagascar
7		Patrice Motsepe	12 March 2021	Incumbent	5 years, 236 days	South Africa

^{†} Indicates that the title of Honorary President was conferred upon leaving office.

^{‡} Acted for a transitional period from 18 August 1987 following Tessema's death in Addis Ababa due to illness until 10 March 1988 when Issa Hayatou was elected as the next president at that day's organized general assembly was held in Casablanca.

== See also ==
- List of presidents of FIFA
- List of presidents of UEFA
- List of presidents of AFC
- List of presidents of CONCACAF
- List of presidents of CONMEBOL
- List of presidents of OFC
