= List of presidents of FIFA =

President of FIFA

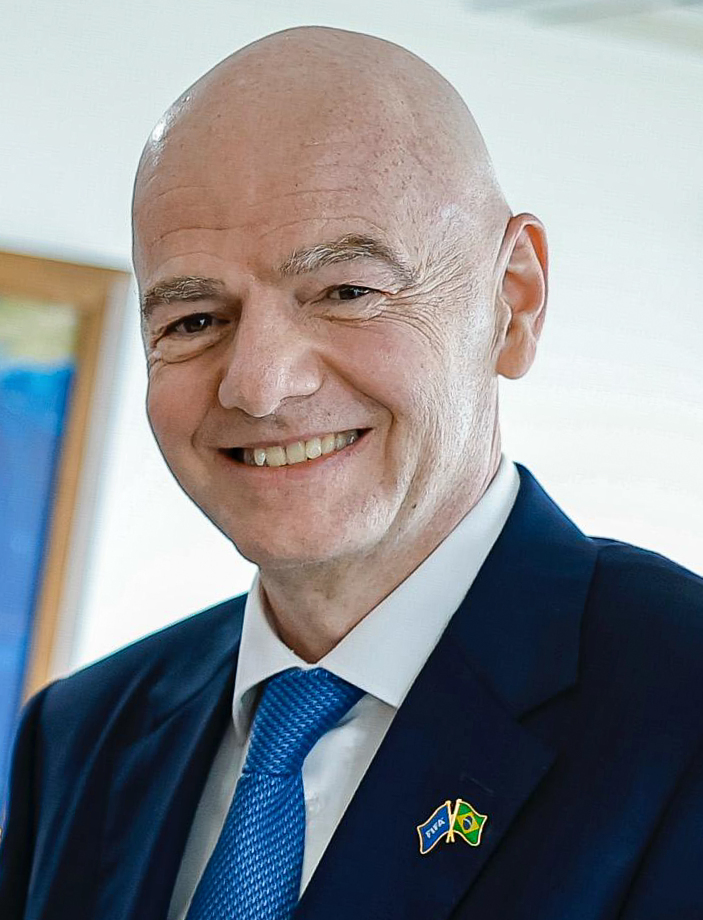
- Incumbent; Gianni Infantino since 26 February 2016
- Fédération Internationale de Football Association (FIFA)
- Style: His Excellency
- Member of: FIFA Council
- Seat: FIFA Headquarters, Zürich, Switzerland
- Appointer: FIFA Congress
- Term length: Four years; Elected in the year following a FIFA World Cup (renewable twice)
- Constituting instrument: FIFA Statutes
- Formation: 21 May 1904
- First holder: Robert Guérin
- Deputy: Senior Vice President of FIFA
- Salary: €5.5 million (2026)
- Website: Official website

The president of FIFA serves as the chief executive of the governing body of world association football. There have been 9 presidents in FIFA's history. Jules Rimet is the longest-serving FIFA president, in office for 33 years from 1921 to 1954. Three presidents – Daniel Burley Woolfall, Rodolphe Seeldrayers, and Arthur Drewry – died during their term in office. Gianni Infantino has served as the current president since initial election on 26 February 2016 and reelection on 16 March 2023.

== Presidents of FIFA ==
No.	Portrait	Name (born–died)	Term of office			Country of origin
No.	Portrait	Name (born–died)	Took office	Left office	Time in office	Country of origin
1		Robert Guérin (1876–1952)	22 May 1904	4 June 1906	2 years, 12 days	France
2		Daniel Burley Woolfall (1852–1918)	4 June 1906	24 October 1918 (died in office)	12 years, 142 days	England
–		Cornelis August Wilhelm Hirschman (Note: Named Honorary FIFA Secretary) (1877–1951) acting	24 October 1918	28 August 1920 (Note: Rimet was provisionally placed in control of FIFA as chairman during the 1920 Summer Olympics in Antwerp, Belgium.)	1 year, 309 days	Netherlands
–		Jules Rimet (Note: Named Honorary FIFA President on 21 June 1954) (1873–1956)	28 August 1920	1 March 1921	185 days	France
3		Jules Rimet (1873–1956)	1 March 1921	21 June 1954	33 years, 112 days	France
4		Rodolphe Seeldrayers (1876–1955)	21 June 1954	7 October 1955 (died in office)	1 year, 108 days	Belgium
–		Arthur Drewry (1891–1961)	7 October 1955	9 June 1956	246 days	England
5		Arthur Drewry (1891–1961)	9 June 1956	25 March 1961 (died in office)	4 years, 289 days	England
–		Ernst Thommen (1899–1967) acting	25 March 1961	28 September 1961	187 days	Switzerland
6		Stanley Rous (Note: Named Honorary FIFA President on 11 June 1974) (1895–1986)	28 September 1961	8 May 1974	12 years, 222 days	England
7		João Havelange (Note: Named Honorary FIFA President on 8 June 1998) (1916–2016)	8 May 1974	8 June 1998	24 years, 31 days	Brazil
8		Sepp Blatter (born 1936)	8 June 1998	8 October 2015 (impeached) (Note: Following his impeachment, Blatter was given an eight-year exclusion from all football-related activities on 21 December 2015 (reduced to six years on 24 February 2016), which was renewed for six years on 24 March 2021.)	17 years, 122 days	Switzerland
–		Issa Hayatou (Note: Following the provisional exclusion on Sepp Blatter, Issa Hayatou assumed the Office of FIFA President on an interim basis in accordance with article 32(6) of the FIFA Statutes because Hayatou was the longest-serving vice-president on FIFA's Executive Committee.) (1946–2024) acting	8 October 2015	26 February 2016	141 days	Cameroon
9		Gianni Infantino (born 1970)	26 February 2016	Incumbent	10 years, 266 days	Switzerland (Note: Infantino is also a citizen of Italy through his parents, and of Lebanon through marriage.)

== See also ==
- List of association football competitions
- List of presidents of AFC
- List of presidents of CAF
- List of presidents of CONCACAF
- List of presidents of CONMEBOL
- List of presidents of OFC
- List of presidents of UEFA
