= Abdel Aziz Salem =

First president of the Confederation of African Football

- عبد العزيز سالم

1st President of CAF
- In office 1957–1958
- Succeeded by: Abdel Aziz Mostafa

Personal details
- Born: 1895 Abu Kebir, Sharqia Governorate, Egypt

Abdelaziz Abdallah Salem (Arabic: عبد العزيز عبد الله سالم) was an Egyptian engineer and the first president of the Confederation of African Football (CAF).

In tribute to Abdelaziz Salem, the first trophy (from 1957 to 1978) of the African Cup of Nations football is called "Abdelaziz Abdallah Salem Trophy".

== Early life ==
Born in 1895 in Abu Kebir, Sharqia Governorate, Abdelaziz Salem began his education in Zagazig. After completing his secondary studies, he attended the Faculty of Agriculture in Cairo University and furthered his education abroad at the University of Cambridge, where he also joined the rowing team.

== Career ==
Upon returning to Egypt, Salem worked at the Ministry of Agriculture in the 1930s. He also played football but had to abandon his sports career due to an injury. Following the 1952 Egyptian revolution, he served as the Minister of Agriculture during the final months of 1952 under Prime Minister Mohamed Naguib.

He was president of the Egyptian Football Association from 1952 to 1959, he was replaced by the military officer, Abdel Hakim Amer. He is also the first African member of the FIFA Executive Committee. He was present at the meeting of 8 which led to the birth of the Confederation of African Football (CAF), of which he became the first president from 1957 to 1958.

== Sources ==
- Dietschy, Paul; Kemo-Keimbou, David-Claude (2008). Le football et l'Afrique (in French). Paris: EPA. ISBN 978-2-85120-674-9.
