= 77th FIFA Congress =

Meeting of FIFA's supreme legislative body

2027 FIFA presidential election
- 18 March 2027
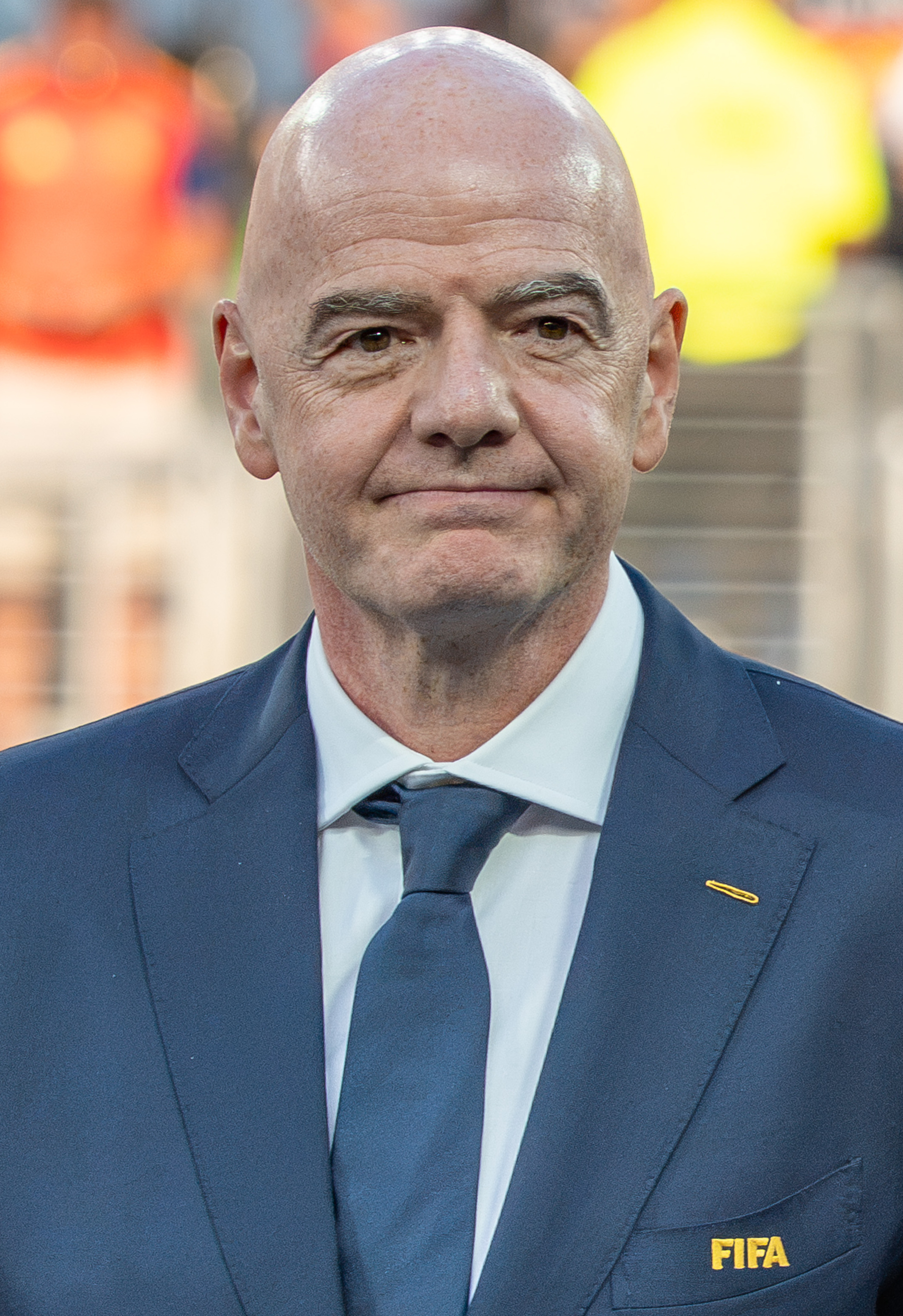

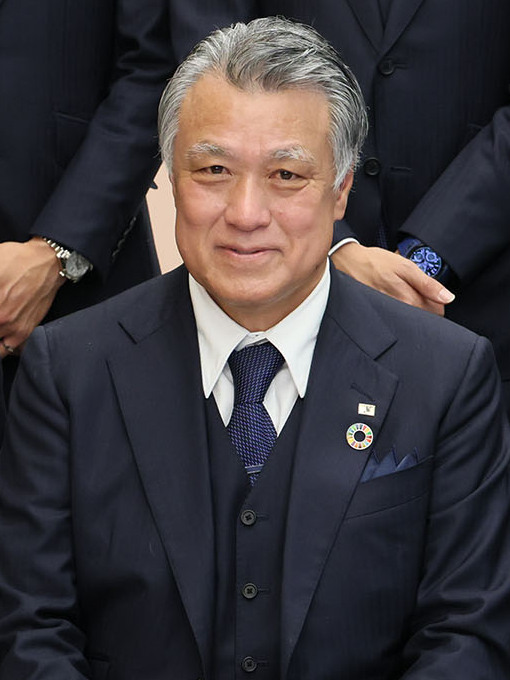

Candidate	Gianni Infantino	Kozo Tashima	Philippe Diallo
Home state	Switzerland (Note: Infantino also holds Italian and Lebanese citizenship.)	Japan	France
Incumbent president
Gianni Infantino

The 77th FIFA Congress will be held in Rabat, Morocco, on 18 March 2027, where the FIFA presidential election will take place. Incumbent FIFA President Gianni Infantino is seeking re-election for a fourth term.

Following the collapse of the FIFA Forward Enterprise proposal, Infantino faced increasing opposition to his re-election bid, with several European football associations withdrawing their support over concerns regarding FIFA's governance, transparency, leadership and the proposed commercial structure. However, a number of associations, particularly in Asia and Africa, continued to support his leadership.

== Background ==
=== Election campaign ===
On 30 April 2026, during the 76th FIFA Congress in Vancouver, incumbent FIFA President Gianni Infantino announced that he would seek a fourth term in office.

=== Infantino's early opposition ===
In November 2022, the Danish Football Association announced that it would not support Infantino's re-election as FIFA president, following the controversy over the OneLove armband during the 2022 FIFA World Cup. DBU president Jesper Møller said that Denmark would not support Infantino if he remained the only candidate, criticizing FIFA's decision to threaten players with yellow cards for wearing the anti-discrimination armband. On 15 July 2026, it was reported that Bernd Neuendorf, president of the German Football Association, had declined to sign a letter endorsing Infantino's re-election campaign. On 21 July, Javier Tebas, president of the Spanish football league (La Liga), accused FIFA and Infantino of governing world football according to their own interests and called for Infantino to resign.

=== FIFA Forward Enterprise controversy and challenges to Infantino ===
The failure of the FIFA Forward Enterprise proposal in July 2026 led to increased speculation that Infantino's re-election, previously considered likely, was no longer assured. Prince Ali bin Hussein, President of the Jordan Football Association, called for the abolition of secret voting in FIFA presidential elections, arguing that greater transparency was needed to address what he described as a crisis in football leadership.

=== European associations withdraw support ===
On 30 July 2026, the Football Association of Finland withdrew its backing for Gianni Infantino's re-election campaign as FIFA president after its board reassessed its previous decision to support his continuation in office, citing concerns over FIFA's governance, transparency, decision-making processes, and the proposed establishment of a new corporate structure to manage FIFA World Cup commercial rights. On 3 August, the Football Association of Wales announced its withdrawal of support for Infantino's re-election, referring to wider issues of governance, leadership, and stakeholder management. Later the same day, the Football Association of Serbia and the Swedish Football Association also withdrew their support for Infantino's candidacy, citing governance, transparency and leadership concerns. On 4 August, Prince Ali accused Infantino of "blackmail", alleging that FIFA had refused to assist the Jordan Football Association with issues relating to supporter visas, U.S. taxation during the 2026 FIFA World Cup, and delayed prize money from the 2025 FIFA Arab Cup unless the association endorsed Infantino's re-election campaign. Prince Ali said the Jordan Football Association rejected the alleged pressure and would not support Infantino's candidacy. On the same day, the Hellenic Football Federation wrote to FIFA to withdraw its support to Infantino's reelection bid.

On 6 August, the Football Association (FA) formally withdrew its support for Infantino's re-election, despite FIFA reaffirming its support for his leadership following a crisis meeting in Morocco. On 7 August, the Norwegian Football Federation called for Infantino to resign as FIFA president, with president Lise Klaveness saying the federation had lost trust in his leadership and that there was "no way back" for him. The opposition to Infantino had also spread beyond the associations that had formally withdrawn their support. Croatia, Albania and Romania had likewise withdrawn or suspended their backing, or otherwise indicated that they had lost confidence in Infantino's leadership. The Football Association of Ireland (FAI) withdrew its support for Infantino, citing concerns over governance, transparency and inadequate consultation. On 14 August, New Zealand Football withdrew its support for Infantino's re-election, citing concerns over FIFA's governance and calling for an independent review. On 24 August, the Gibraltar Football Association (GFA) withdrew its support for Infantino's re-election bid, without endorsing an alternative candidate. The day after, the Irish Football Association withdrew their support. A day later, the Italian Football Federation (FIGC) officially announced that it would withdraw its support for Infantino's bid for re-election in 2027. On 30 August, the Royal Dutch Football Association (KNVB) withdrew its confidence in Infantino's leadership, calling for new FIFA leadership from 2027 onwards and broader reforms to FIFA's governance, transparency, oversight and decision-making processes.

- Finland (30 July 2026)
- Wales (3 August 2026)
- Serbia (3 August 2026)
- Sweden (3 August 2026)
- Greece (4 August 2026)
- England (6 August 2026)
- Norway (7 August 2026)
- Croatia
- Albania
- Romania
- Republic of Ireland (13 August 2026)
- New Zealand (14 August 2026)
- Gibraltar (24 August 2026)
- Northern Ireland (25 August 2026)
- Italy (26 August 2026)
- Netherlands (30 August 2026)
- Scotland

=== Associations supporting Infantino ===
In contrast, several associations reaffirmed their support for Infantino following FIFA's withdrawal of the proposed FIFA Forward Enterprise structure. The Qatar Football Association welcomed the decision, saying it preserved unity among FIFA member associations, and reaffirmed its support for Infantino. The United Arab Emirates Football Association and the Royal Moroccan Football Federation also welcomed the withdrawal of the proposal and expressed continued support for Infantino's leadership.

The Djiboutian Football Federation and the Egyptian Football Association also backed Infantino, with the latter describing FIFA's decision as a sign of commitment to dialogue and unity among member associations. Support for Infantino was also reported from associations including Kuwait, Sri Lanka and Lebanon, while smaller member associations such as Bhutan and Vanuatu were identified as potential allies due to their reliance on FIFA development funding. Indonesia, the Philippines, Mauritania, Niger and the Democratic Republic of the Congo were among the countries reported to have expressed support for Infantino.

The Argentine Football Association (AFA), Mexican Football Federation (FMF), and Confederation of African Football (CAF) all backed Gianni Infantino's leadership, expressing continued support for his presidency while emphasizing governance, transparency, and institutional processes. Other African football associations reported as supporting Infantino included Nigeria, Comoros, Malawi, Uganda and Gambia, while Paraguay and Mongolia also expressed support for his leadership. On 13 August, the football associations of Morocco, Qatar, Egypt, Mauritania, Lebanon and Sudan issued a joint statement expressing "full support" for Infantino and confidence in his leadership.

- Qatar
- United Arab Emirates
- Morocco
- Djibouti
- Egypt
- Lebanon
- Argentina
- Mexico
- Paraguay
- Mongolia
- Mauritania
- Sudan

=== Calls for alternative leadership ===
On 4 August 2026, former FIFA president Sepp Blatter backed Lise Klaveness, president of the Norwegian Football Federation, to succeed Gianni Infantino as FIFA president, stating that she "deserves the utmost respect" and arguing that "the time is right for a woman to take the lead" at FIFA.

== Election ==
=== Electoral System ===
The president is elected using the exhaustive ballot system. If there are more than two candidates, a two-thirds majority of member associations present and eligible to vote is required in the first ballot. From the second ballot onwards, the candidate receiving the fewest votes is eliminated in each round until only two candidates remain. Where there are two or fewer candidates, a simple majority (more than 50%) of valid votes cast is sufficient for election. If there is only one candidate, the Congress may instead elect them by acclamation.

=== Candidates ===
The deadline for candidates to submit their nominations, supported by at least five member associations, was 18 November 2026 at 23:59 CET (22:59 GMT).

==== Candidates ====
Confirmed by FIFA as validly nominated on 19 November 2026 having obtained endorsements from five member associations.

- (Italy) / (Switzerland) / (Lebanon) Gianni Infantino – Incumbent FIFA president. Announced his candidacy for a fourth term on 30 April 2026 during the 76th FIFA Congress in Vancouver.
- Kozo Tashima - The honorary president of the Japan Football Association and FIFA Council member announced on 5 November 2026 his intention to stand against Gianni Infantino to be the next FIFA president.
- (France) Philippe Diallo - President of the French Football Federation announced his canidacy on 16 November 2026 and received the unaimous endorsement from the UEFA Executive Committee and European members of the FIFA Council.

Eliminated

- (Switzerland) Ramon Vega - Former Swiss defender announced on 7 October 2026 that he would be running in order to "reunite the global football family, deliver genuine and lasting reform, modernise Fifa for the 21st Century, restore stability and credibility, and rebuild the trust that our game [football] urgently needs." However, he failed to secure the requisite five signatures before the closure of nominations.

==== Explored ====
- (France) Arsène Wenger - FIFA Chief of Global Football Development was reported by media outlets to be considering announcing candidacy but subsequently declined to enter the race.

Speculated

- (Poland) Dariusz Mioduski – Polish entrepreneur and owner of Legia Warsaw. Was touted by several figures within UEFA as a possible alternative candidate.
- (Sweden) / (Netherlands) Mattias Grafström – FIFA Secretary General. Reportedly became increasingly disillusioned with Infantino and has distanced himself from the FIFA Forward Enterprise project leading media to speculate he was considering a challenge to Infantino's leadership.
- (Canada) Victor Montagliani – Canadian businessman and incumbent CONCACAF president.

==== Declined ====
- (Slovenia) Aleksander Čeferin – President of UEFA. Declined to run stating that he wished to seek another term as UEFA president and that he thought he could more effectively oppose Infantino without it appearing transactional.
- (South Africa) Patrice Motsepe – President of CAF (endorsed Infantino). Declined to run, stating that "Infantino is loyal to Africa".
- (Qatar) Nasser Al-Khelaifi – Qatari businessman and owner of Paris Saint-Germain FC. Had been mentioned as a potential candidate and was reportedly backed by several UEFA member associations. He subsequently ruled himself out, stating that he had "absolutely no ambition, no intention, and no interest" in running.
- (Bahrain) Salman bin Ibrahim Al Khalifa – President of the AFC (endorsed Infantino). Had been identified as a potential candidate following growing tensions between the AFC and Infantino over FIFA's governance and decision-making processes. Salman criticised FIFA's lack of consultation with member associations as "totally unacceptable", while the AFC called for an "urgent review" of the organisation's governance. He previously contested the FIFA presidency at the 2016 FIFA Extraordinary Congress, finishing second to Infantino. However on 23 October 2026, he endorsed Infantino for another mandate as president.

=== Results ===
2027 FIFA Congress; 18 March 2027 – Rabat, Morocco
Candidate	Round 1
(Switzerland) Gianni Infantino
(Japan) Kozo Tashima
(France) Philippe Diallo
