= FIFA Congress =

Legislative body of FIFA

The FIFA Congress is the supreme legislative body of FIFA, the international governing body of association football, futsal and beach soccer. The congress may be summoned for an "ordinary" or "extraordinary" session.

An ordinary congress meets every year; an extraordinary congress may be convened by the FIFA Council (formerly Executive Committee) at any time with the support of one-fifth of the members of FIFA.

Each of the 211 members of FIFA has one vote in the congress. The members of FIFA can propose candidates for the World Cup host and presidency of FIFA. The FIFA Presidential Election, FIFA World Cup host country election takes place at the congress in the year following the FIFA World Cup and FIFA Women's World Cup host country election takes place at the congress in the year following the FIFA Women's World Cup.

== History ==
The FIFA Congress has been held annually since 1998. It was previously held every two years. Congresses were not held between 1915 and 1922 and 1939 to 1945, due to the First and Second World Wars. FIFA Presidential Elections have taken place at the 1st, 3rd, 12th, 29th, 30th, 39th, 51st, 53rd, 61st, 65th, 69th and 73rd congresses.

The 1961 FIFA Extraordinary Congress in London elected Stanley Rous as President. The 2016 FIFA Extraordinary Congress in Zürich elected Gianni Infantino as the new president on 26 February 2016. Only five elections have had two or more candidates: the 39th (1974), 51st (1998), 53rd (2002), 65th (2015), and 2016 Extraordinary Congress.

== List of congresses ==
Congress voting for president
* Extraordinary Congress
Congress voting for World Cup Host
Congress voting for Women's World Cup Host

Congress number	Year	City	Member associations attending	Notes
1st	1904	(French Third Republic) Paris	5	First FIFA Congress. Robert Guérin elected as the first president of FIFA.
2nd	1905	(French Third Republic) Paris	5	
3rd	1906	(Switzerland) Bern	7	
4th	1907	(Netherlands) Amsterdam	12	
5th	1908	(Austria-Hungary) Vienna	16	
*	1908	(Belgium) Brussels	7	
6th	1909	(Austria-Hungary) Budapest	13	
7th	1910	(Italy) Milan	12	
8th	1911	(Germany) Dresden	11	
9th	1912	(Sweden) Stockholm	17	
10th	1913	(Denmark) Copenhagen	12	
11th	1914	(Norway) Christiania (Oslo)	17	Last Congress before World War I.
12th	1923	(Switzerland) Geneva	17	First Congress after World War I. Jules Rimet elected FIFA president.
13th	1924	(French Third Republic) Paris	27	
14th	1925	(First Czechoslovak Republic) Prague	22	
15th	1926	(Italy) Rome	23	
16th	1927	(Finland) Helsinki	21	
17th	1928	(Netherlands) Amsterdam	29	
18th	1929	(Spain) Barcelona	23	Uruguay selected as the host of the 1930 FIFA World Cup.
19th	1930	(Hungary) Budapest	27	
20th	1931	(Germany) Berlin	25	
21st	1932	(Sweden) Stockholm	29	Italy selected as the host of the 1934 FIFA World Cup.
22nd	1934	(Italy) Rome	27	
23rd	1936	(Germany) Berlin	37	France selected as the host of the 1938 FIFA World Cup.
24th	1938	(French Third Republic) Paris	30	Last Congress before World War II.
25th	1946	Luxembourg	34	First Congress after World War II. Brazil selected as the host of the 1950 FIFA World Cup. Switzerland selected as the host of the 1954 FIFA World Cup.
26th	1948	(England) London	48	
27th	1950	(Brazil) Rio de Janeiro	35	Sweden selected as the host of the 1958 FIFA World Cup.
28th	1952	(Finland) Helsinki	56	
*	1953	(France) Paris	48	
29th	1954	(Switzerland) Bern	52	
30th	1956	(Portugal) Lisbon	57	Arthur Drewry elected FIFA president. Chile selected as the host of the 1962 FIFA World Cup.
31st	1958	(Sweden) Stockholm	62	
32nd	1960	(Italy) Rome	69	England selected as the host of the 1966 FIFA World Cup.
*	1961	(England) London	67	Stanley Rous elected FIFA president.
33rd	1962	(Chile) Santiago	59	
34th	1964	(Japan) Tokyo	99	
35th	1966	(England) London	94	
36th	1968	(Mexico) Guadalajara	78	
37th	1970	Mexico City	86	
38th	1972	(France) Paris	102	
39th	1974	(West Germany) Frankfurt	122	João Havelange elected FIFA president.
40th	1976	(Canada) Montreal	108	
41st	1978	(Argentina) Buenos Aires	107	João Havelange elected to a second term as FIFA president.
42nd	1980	(Switzerland) Zürich	103	
43rd	1982	(Spain) Madrid	127	João Havelange elected to a third term as FIFA president.
44th	1984	(Switzerland) Zürich	112	
45th	1986	Mexico City	111	João Havelange elected to a fourth term as FIFA president.
46th	1988	(Switzerland) Zürich	111	United States selected as the host of the 1994 FIFA World Cup.
47th	1990	(Italy) Rome	130	João Havelange elected to a fifth term as FIFA president.
48th	1992	(Switzerland) Zürich	118	France selected as the host of the 1998 FIFA World Cup.
49th	1994	(United States) Chicago	164	
50th	1996	(Switzerland) Zürich	182	Japan and South Korea selected as the hosts of the 2002 FIFA World Cup.
51st (details)	1998	(France) Paris	196	Sepp Blatter elected FIFA president.
*	1999	(United States) Los Angeles	195	
52nd	2000	(Switzerland) Zürich	200	Germany selected as the host of the 2006 FIFA World Cup.
*	2001	(Argentina) Buenos Aires	202	
*	2002	(South Korea) Seoul	202	
53rd (details)	2002	(South Korea) Seoul	202	Sepp Blatter elected to a second term as FIFA president.
*	2003	(Qatar) Doha	204	
54th	2004	(France) Paris	203	South Africa selected as the host of the 2010 FIFA World Cup.
55th	2005	(Morocco) Marrakesh	203	
56th	2006	(Germany) Munich	207	
57th	2007	(Switzerland) Zürich	206	Sepp Blatter elected to a third term as FIFA president.
58th	2008	(Australia) Sydney	200	
59th	2009	(The Bahamas) Nassau	205	
60th	2010	(South Africa) Johannesburg	207	
61st (details)	2011	(Switzerland) Zürich	208	Sepp Blatter elected to a fourth term as FIFA president.
62nd	2012	(Hungary) Budapest	209	
63rd	2013	(Mauritius) Port Louis	208	
64th	2014	(Brazil) São Paulo	209	
65th (details)	2015	(Switzerland) Zürich	210	Sepp Blatter elected to a fifth term as FIFA president.
* (details)	2016	(Switzerland) Zürich	207	Gianni Infantino elected FIFA president.
66th	2016	Mexico City	209	
67th	2017	(Bahrain) Manama	211	
68th (details)	2018	(Russia) Moscow	210	United States, Mexico, and Canada selected as the hosts of the 2026 FIFA World Cup.
69th (details)	2019	(France) Paris	211	Gianni Infantino elected to a second term as FIFA president.
70th	2020	(Switzerland) Zürich (Note: The 70th FIFA Congress, originally scheduled to take place in Addis Ababa on 5 June 2020, was rescheduled as an online event on 18 September 2020 due to the COVID-19 pandemic in Ethiopia.)	211	
71st	2021	(Switzerland) Zürich (Note: The 71st FIFA Congress, originally scheduled to take place in Tokyo in May 2021, was rescheduled as an online event on 21 May 2021 due to the COVID-19 pandemic in Japan.)	211	
72nd	2022	(Qatar) Doha	210	
73rd (details)	2023	(Rwanda) Kigali	208	Gianni Infantino elected to a third term as FIFA president.
74th	2024	(Thailand) Bangkok	211	Brazil selected as the host of the 2027 FIFA Women's World Cup.
*	2024	(Switzerland) Zürich (Note: The FIFA extraordinary congress was held online)	211	Morocco, Portugal, and Spain selected as the hosts of the 2030 FIFA World Cup. Saudi Arabia selected as the host of the 2034 FIFA World Cup.
75th	2025	(Paraguay) Asunción	210	
76th	2026	(Canada) Vancouver	210	
*	2026	(Switzerland) Zürich (Note: The FIFA extraordinary congress will be held online)	211	Costa Rica, Jamaica, Mexico and United States expected be awarded the 2031 FIFA Women's World Cup. United Kingdom expected to be awarded the 2035 FIFA Women's World Cup.
77th (details)	2027	(Morocco) Rabat	TBC	2029 FIFA Club World Cup host to be announced
78th	2028		TBC	
79th	2029			
80th	2030	(Morocco) (Portugal) (Spain)		

== Extraordinary congresses ==
A total of ten extraordinary congresses have taken place: 1908 (Brussels), 1953 (Paris), 1961 (London), 1999 (Los Angeles), 2001 (Buenos Aires), 2002 (Seoul), 2003 (Doha), 2016 (Zürich), 2024 (Online), and 2026 (Online). In the 2016 Extraordinary Congress, FIFA President Sepp Blatter would have remained in his position until his successor is elected. However, due to the fact he was suspended, the Acting FIFA President, Issa Hayatou was in charge of FIFA.

== See also ==
- List of presidents of FIFA
- List of IOC meetings
- UEFA Congress
