= Victor Montagliani =

Canadian soccer executive and businessman

- Montagliani in 2026

Vice president of FIFA from CONCACAF
- Incumbent
- Assumed office May 2016
- Preceded by: Sunil Gulati

7th President of CONCACAF
- Incumbent
- Assumed office May 12, 2016
- Preceded by: Alfredo Hawit

33rd President of the Canadian Soccer Association
- In office May 5, 2012 – May 7, 2017
- Preceded by: Dominic Maestracci
- Succeeded by: Steve Reed

Personal details
- Born: Vittorio Montagliani; September 12, 1965 (age 61) East Vancouver, Canada
- Education: Simon Fraser University

Vittorio "Victor" Montagliani (Italian: [montaʎˈʎaːni]; born September 12, 1965) is a Canadian businessman, soccer executive, and the president of CONCACAF. He is a vice president of the FIFA Council. Montagliani was previously the president of the Canadian Soccer Association from 2012 to 2017.

== Biography ==
Montagliani was born in East Vancouver to an Italian family. He is a former player of amateur soccer club side Columbus F.C., where his father was club president. Montagliani also played futsal and was called up to the Canada national team until injuries prevented him from playing professionally. He graduated from Simon Fraser University with a Bachelor of Arts degree in 1988 and worked as a flight attendant and in the insurance industry. In his professional career, Montagliani was a manager at Hogan & Cox Insurance Adjusters in Maple Ridge before being transferred to Vancouver in 2003.

In 2002, he returned to soccer as an administrator and joined the Vancouver Metro Soccer League board. Montagliani became the president of the British Columbia Soccer Association in 2004 and was named to the board of the Canadian Soccer Association. During his time at BC Soccer, Montagliani was supportive of Sikh players wearing a patka should they want to, after a match official had told a 17-year-old player to remove it or leave the game. Montagliani was elected the vice president of the Canadian Soccer Association in 2005 and served several terms during preparations for the 2007 FIFA Under-20 World Cup and 2015 FIFA Women's World Cup. He was then voted in as president of the Canadian Soccer Association in May 2012. Montagliani led the association as it guided the delivery of the 2015 FIFA Women's World Cup and the creation of the Canadian Premier League under Canada Soccer Business, a private company that manages Canadian soccer media rights. He was also accused of downplaying allegations of sexual assault by former women's coach Bob Birarda during his tenure at the CSA.

In July 2012, Montagliani was one of the primary proponents who first proposed that Canada bid for the 2026 FIFA World Cup. This early advocacy laid the groundwork for what would eventually become the successful tripartite United Bid alongside the United States and Mexico, which was awarded the hosting rights in 2018. Montagliani also opposed the 2015 re-election of Sepp Blatter as FIFA president and was part of a task force to stabilize CONCACAF operations after the 2015 corruption case conducted by U.S. authorities.

In February 2016, Montagliani announced his intention to run for CONCACAF president. He won the presidency on May 12, 2016, defeating Larry Mussenden of Bermuda to become the first person from outside of the Caribbean to hold the post since 1969. Montagliani was unanimously reelected in 2023. In 2024, he was paid over US$3 million by CONCACAF and $300,000 from FIFA.

Montagliani had emerged as a leading candidate for the FIFA presidency, but has not formally announced his candidacy for the 2027 election. In October 2026, it was reported he was interested in continuing his role at CONCACAF instead.
