= 53rd FIFA Congress =

2002 football congress

2002 FIFA presidential election
- 28 May 2002
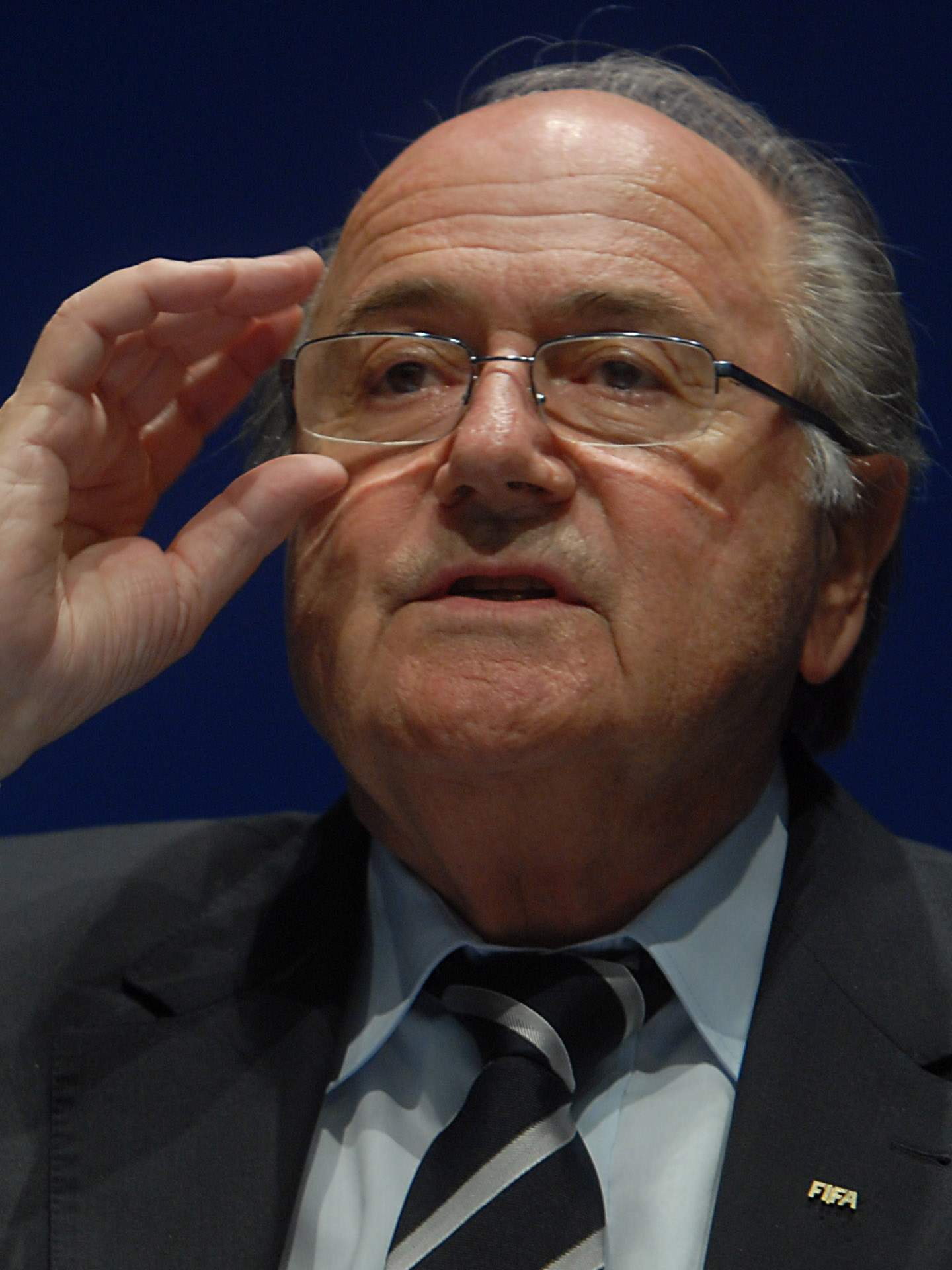

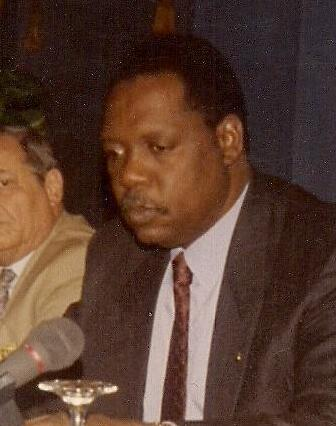
Candidate	Sepp Blatter	Issa Hayatou
Popular vote	139	56
Percentage	71.28%	28.71%
President before election
(Switzerland) Sepp Blatter
Next President
(Switzerland) Sepp Blatter

The 53rd FIFA Congress was held in May 2002 in Seoul, South Korea before the 2002 FIFA World Cup. It was the annual meeting of the international governing body of association football FIFA. The congress saw the re-election of Joseph "Sepp" Blatter as the President of FIFA.

== 2002 presidential election ==
The election for the President of FIFA was held at the congress, with the incumbent, Joseph "Sepp" Blatter facing a challenge from the Cameroonian football executive and president of the Confederation of African Football, Issa Hayatou. Blatter won with 139 of the 195 votes cast. Like the previous presidential election at the 51st FIFA Congress, this congress was overshadowed by accusations of fraud and corruption after 11 members of FIFA's Executive Committee had filed a criminal complaint against Blatter with courts in Zurich. A question and answer session was held at the congress the day before the election in which Blatter refused to allow Hayatou and the FIFA Vice-President David Will to take part. Delegates booed Blatter afterwards and Blatter and Hayatou were involved in a verbal confrontation. Will was described as "shaking with rage" by reporters.

=== Voting results ===
53rd FIFA Congress; May 28, 2002 – Seoul, South Korea
Candidate	Round 1
(Switzerland) Sepp Blatter	139
(Cameroon) Issa Hayatou	56
