= Pierre Kakhia =

Pierre Kakhia is president of the Lebanese Basketball Federation, and a member of the Lebanese Olympic Committee.

== Career ==
He works in the world of Lebanese and Middle East sports (Basketball but also Football). He is president of West Asia at World Sport Group.

In 2001, Kakhia established the West Asian Football Federation (WAFF) which was located in Jordan and headed by Prince Ali bin Hussein.

He was marketing manager of the Qatar Football Federation, and is currently the Head of Sports of the Lebanese Forces political party in Lebanon.

Kakhia has business ties to Sheikh Salman Bin Ibrahim Al-Khalifa, president of the Asian Football Confederation.
