= 2029 FIFA Club World Cup =

International association football tournament held in 2029

FIFA Club World Cup 2029; Coupe du Monde des Clubs de la FIFA 2029; Mundial de Clubes FIFA 2029

Tournament details
- Dates: Summer 2029
- Teams: TBD (from 6 (Note: European teams may not participate if UEFA's boycott of FIFA competitions over the FIFA Forward Enterprise proposal and unpaid solidarity payments tied to the 2025 FIFA Club World Cup continues.) confederations)

The 2029 FIFA Club World Cup will be the upcoming edition of the FIFA Club World Cup, an international club football competition organised by FIFA, the 2029 edition can be the first one where FIFA organizes with the European Football Clubs.

Chelsea are the reigning champions, having won their first title under the new four-year format, in 2025.

== Potential bids ==
- Australia (or as a joint bid with New Zealand): After the highly successful 2023 FIFA Women's World Cup, Football Australia president James Johnson stated that, in order to continue the momentum after the tournament, Australia would bid for both the 2026 AFC Women's Asian Cup (for which their bid was successful) and the 2029 FIFA Club World Cup.
- Brazil: On 20 June 2025 the Brazilian Football Confederation formally expressed its interest in hosting the tournament. The organisation's president, Samir Xaud, communicated the intention to FIFA president Gianni Infantino, who was receptive to the idea. The bid would build on the infrastructure used in previous FIFA events, such as the 2013 FIFA Confederations Cup, 2014 FIFA World Cup and the 2027 FIFA Women's World Cup. Brazil reiterated their interest in January 2026.
- England: In November 2025, reports suggested that England could host the tournament to improve relations with the Premier League and give more slots to English teams who were excluded from the previous edition. England has hosted the 1966 FIFA World Cup, but has never hosted the Club World Cup in the past. England is set to co-host UEFA Euro 2028 and also the 2035 FIFA Women's World Cup along with other countries in the British Isles.
- Germany: In November 2025, it was reported that Germany expressed its interest in hosting the tournament. Germany has hosted the 1974 FIFA World Cup as West Germany and the 2006 FIFA World Cup as a unified nation, but has never hosted the Club World Cup in the past.
- Mexico: Mikel Arriola, the president of the Mexican Football Federation has formally expressed the country's interest in hosting the tournament. The country hosted multiple FIFA tournaments in the past including the 1970 and the 1986 World Cups, alongside co-hosting the 2026 FIFA World Cup with Canada and United States but has never hosted the Club World Cup before. Mexico is set to host the 2031 FIFA Women's World Cup along with the United States, Costa Rica, and Jamaica.
- Qatar: Qatar has expressed interest in hosting the tournament. Their proposal involves holding the tournament in winter to avoid the summer heat, utilising the existing infrastructure from the 2022 FIFA World Cup. Qatari officials have stated that the closeness of the existing stadiums and training bases negating the need for air travel would make the tournament carbon-neutral. The potential schedule could face opposition from European leagues due to the disruption of their domestic seasons. However, with the tournament confirmed to take place in June–July, it is likely that Qatar's bid will not proceed.
- Spain, Portugal and Morocco: After a meeting in Lisbon between the three nations, the Royal Moroccan Football Federation president Fouzi Lekjaa said in an interview that all three countries would host the tournament as a preparation event for the 2030 FIFA World Cup. Morocco had originally wanted to host the event by itself.
- United States: In December 2024, it was reported that FIFA was considering awarding the United States a second Club World Cup with the hopes of gaining American sponsors, and to allow leagues to continue marketing efforts in the country. The country hosted the 2026 FIFA World Cup with Canada and Mexico, has been confirmed to host the 2028 FIFA Women's Club World Cup, and is set to co-host the 2031 FIFA Women's World Cup with Mexico, Costa Rica, and Jamaica. In July 2026, the United States expressed interest again, citing the commercial success of the 2026 FIFA World Cup as a reason for FIFA to consider them as hosts.

== Potential expansion and slot allocation ==
In June 2025, it was reported that FIFA was to hold a consultation about expanding the Club World Cup to 48 teams, after clubs in Europe lobbied that they were financially missing out. After confirming the dates for the 2029 tournament in August 2025, FIFA had reportedly notified the six continental bodies that this edition was likely to feature more than the 32 clubs, and has also explored the possibility of changing the Club World Cup's frequency to biennial.

In June 2026, The Guardian reported that FIFA's joint venture with European Football Clubs was expected to accelerate plans to expand the tournament to 48 teams, while EFC also sought the removal of the two-club-per-country restriction.

== Qualified teams ==
FIFA are yet to announce the access list for the tournament. It is expected that qualification will be based on the confederations' club championships and club coefficients.

Confederation	Team(s)	Qualification	Qualified date	Source(s)
AFC	(Saudi Arabia) Al-Ahli	Winners of the 2024–25 and 2025–26 AFC Champions League Elite	3 May 2025	
CAF	(Egypt) Pyramids	Winners of the 2024–25 CAF Champions League	1 June 2025	
CAF	(South Africa) Mamelodi Sundowns	Winners of the 2025–26 CAF Champions League	24 May 2026	
CONCACAF	(Mexico) Cruz Azul	Winners of the 2025 CONCACAF Champions Cup	1 June 2025	
CONCACAF	(Mexico) Toluca	Winners of the 2026 CONCACAF Champions Cup	30 May 2026	
CONMEBOL	(Brazil) Flamengo	Winners of the 2025 Copa Libertadores	29 November 2025	
UEFA	(France) Paris Saint-Germain	Winners of the 2024–25 and 2025–26 UEFA Champions League	31 May 2025	

== Broadcasting ==
As November 2026, the model is planned to follow the 2025 broadcasting model, with DAZN exercising a renewel option and being the main worldwide broadcaster, sub-licencing to local broadcasters around the world.

== Controvercies ==
On 30 July 2026, following FIFA's announcement of FIFA Forward Enterprise (a proposal to sell stakes in FIFA's tournament operations, including for the FIFA Club World Cup, to private investors), all 55 UEFA member associations agreed on an indefinite boycott of FIFA competitions until the proposal was shelved and assurances were made that such a proposal would not be tabulated again. A day later on 31 July, the proposal was scrapped, although UEFA stated that, regardless, it no longer trusts FIFA's governance. The boycott ended on with focus changing into the 2027 FIFA President Election.

== See also ==
- 2028 FIFA Women's Club World Cup
