= 73rd FIFA Congress =

Meeting of FIFA's supreme legislative body

2023 FIFA presidential election
- 16 March 2023
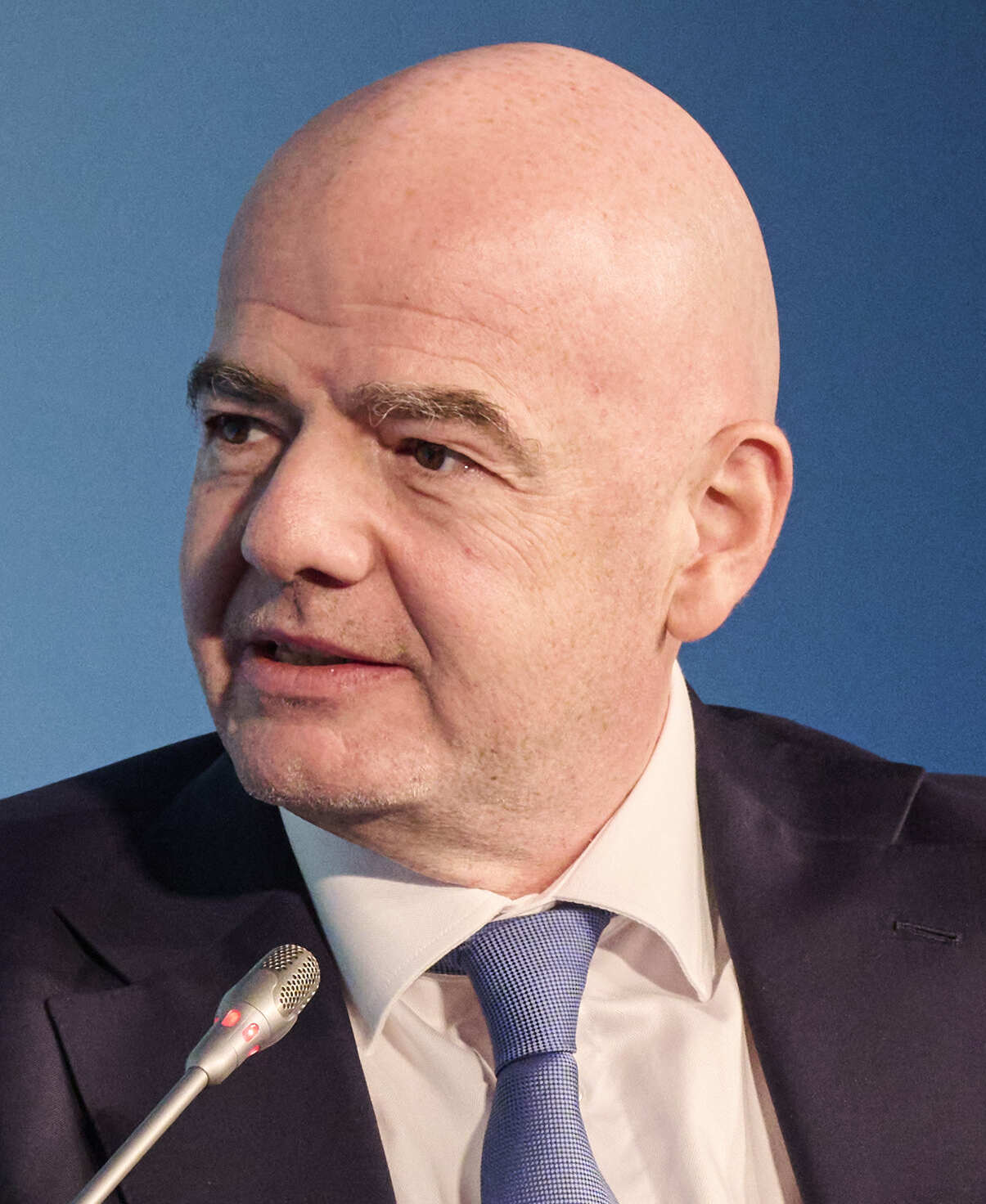
Candidate	Gianni Infantino
Popular vote	Acclamation
President before election
(Switzerland) / (Italy) Gianni Infantino
Elected President
(Switzerland) / (Italy) Gianni Infantino

The 73rd FIFA Congress was held in BK Arena in Kigali, Rwanda, on 16 March 2023. It is an elective congress where they propose candidates for the office of FIFA President. There was only one candidate put forward.

== 2023 Presidential Election ==
On 31 March 2022, during the 72nd FIFA Congress in Doha, incumbent FIFA President Gianni Infantino announced his candidacy for a third term. After the deadline on 18 November 2022, he was the only candidate, thus he won the election by acclamation. Seven members did not support the continuation of his presidency.

=== Voting results ===
73rd FIFA Congress; 16 March 2023 – Kigali, Rwanda
Candidate	Round 1
(Switzerland) / (Italy) Gianni Infantino	Acclamation
