= AFDP Global =

Football development group

AFDP Global (Association Football Development Programme) is an international football social enterprise and was launched in October 2018 at the Emirates Stadium in London. AFDP Global is the successor organisation to the Asian Football Development Programme (AFDP) which was founded by Prince Ali bin Al-Hussein in 2012 and focused on Asia and the Middle East. Its achievements included reaching over 80,000 young people directly through its projects; training over 500 coaches, administrators and referees in refugee camps, schools and clubs; distributing 100,000 footballs to young people's programmes and organisations and completing 30 projects reaching 25 countries. AFDP Global extends this remit so as to reach more children in disadvantaged communities worldwide.

The organisation campaigns to promote respect, equality and tolerance in football.

== History ==
Following allegations of sexual and physical abuse concerning the Afghanistan national women's football team, AFDP Global convened a round table in London on Feb 5th 2019 which recommended FIFA set up a fully independent enquiry into the abuse and establish a proper grievance procedure to protect the victims. Following the round table, Kelly Lindsay, coach to the Afghanistan national women's team, began working with AFDP Global to promote good governance in women's football. AFDP Global continues to highlight this case and other issues affecting women's football. In June 2019, Keramuddin Keram, President of the Afghan Football Association, was banned for life by FIFA because he had "abused his position and sexually abused various female players, in violation of the FIFA Code of Ethics".

In March 2019, the organisation named former France and Liverpool Manager Gerard Houllier, Canadian international Karina LeBlanc and former Arsenal and France footballer Robert Pires as its first three ambassadors.

In July 2019, AFDP Global launched the Fearless Football campaign to end abuse, harassment and exploitation of female players in world football. It is supported by 75 senior figures from the women's and men's games, including Aleksander Čeferin, President of UEFA, current Chelsea Women's Manager Emma Hayes and former international footballers Eniola Aluko, Heather O'Reilly, Kelly Smith, Khalida Popal, Jamie Carragher, Robbie Fowler, Louis Saha and Landon Donovan.
