= 61st FIFA Congress =

2011 football congress

2011 FIFA presidential election
- 1 June 2011
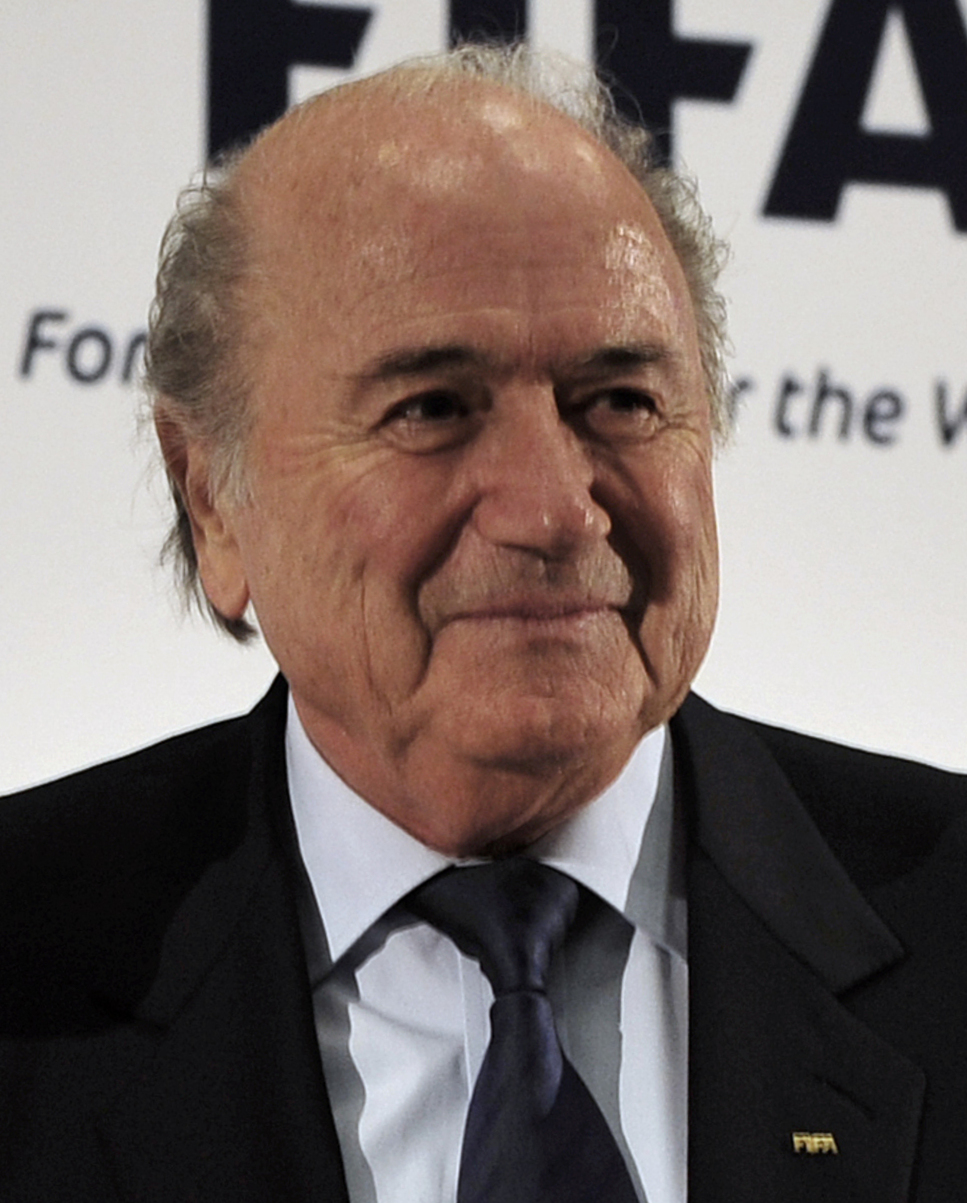
| Candidate | Sepp Blatter |
| Popular vote | 186 |
| Percentage | 90.29% |
President before election
(Switzerland) Sepp Blatter
Next President
(Switzerland) Sepp Blatter

The 61st FIFA Congress was held between 31 May and 1 June 2011 at the Hallenstadion in Zürich, Switzerland. FIFA is the governing body of world association football, and the congress is the annual meeting of FIFA's supreme legislative body. This is the eighth congress to be held in Zürich, and the first since 2007. After an opening ceremony and a reminder of FIFA events and activities in 2010, the second day witnessed decisions taken, and the unveiling of the 2010 financial results. The opening ceremony was presented by Melanie Winiger, and featured singer Grace Jones, hammered dulcimer player Nicolas Senn, and juggler Alan Šulc.

== Congress agenda ==
The congress agenda was released on 5 May.

Internal reform

Following the allegations of corruption Blatter announced changes to FIFA's internal processes. Future FIFA World Cups will be selected by the whole FIFA Congress rather than the FIFA Executive Committee, an internal committee will examine FIFA's corporate governance, and the FIFA Ethics Committee will be strengthened.

UAE residency motion

A motion bought by the United Arab Emirates Football Association to relax eligibility rules for foreign-born players was rejected by 153 to 42, with 11 abstentions. The motion argued that players 18 or older could switch countries after three years' residence instead of five. The president of the UAE football association Mohamed al-Rumaithi argued that the proposed change was good for countries trying to qualify for the FIFA World Cup. The motion was also supported by the UAE Football League and Srečko Katanec, the head coach of the United Arab Emirates national football team. The proposal was interpreted as a way for rich countries to attract foreign players with offers of citizenship.

== 2011 presidential election ==
The election for the presidency of FIFA was held on the second day of the congress. The incumbent, Sepp Blatter of Switzerland, was elected in 1998. Blatter won two previous presidential elections in 2002 and 2007. Blatter was the sole candidate for the presidency, after the only other candidate, Qatari Mohammed bin Hammam withdrew from the presidential race on 28 May.

The English Football Association (FA) vowed not to take part in the presidential vote citing a "well-reported range of issues...which made it difficult to support either candidate". On 31 May the FA and the Scottish Football Association called for the presidential election to be postponed. The FA also called for the appointment of an "independent external party to make recommendations regarding improved governance and compliance procedures and structures throughout the FIFA decision making processes for consideration by the full membership". The FA's stance was supported by the President of the FA, Prince William, Duke of Cambridge. The chairman of the FA, David Bernstein put a proposal to congress to delay the presidential vote, this was opposed by 172 of 206 voters. The FA's proposal was later criticized by members from the Congolese Association Football Federation, Benin Football Federation, Haitian Football Federation, Fiji Football Association and the Cyprus Football Association. The senior vice-president of FIFA and president of the Argentine Football Association, Julio Grondona, retorted "We always have attacks from England which are mostly lies with the support of journalism which is more busy lying than telling the truth...It looks like England is always complaining...I say will you leave the FIFA family alone, and when you speak, speak with truth."

The President of the Malian Football Federation, Hammadoun Kolado Cisse, announced his desire for FIFA's General Assembly rather than the FIFA Executive Committee to make the final decision on which countries host the World Cup. Cisse said that "If every country can vote on who hosts the event, that will cut down on corruption because you can't corrupt 203 federations."

On 1 June Blatter was re-elected president for a fourth term unopposed, with 186 of the 203 votes in his favour.

=== Bin Hammam presidential campaign ===
The head of the Asian Football Confederation (AFC), Mohammed bin Hammam of Qatar, announced his candidacy in March 2011. Bin Hammam said that if elected he would establish a transparency committee. Bin Hammam said that Blatter was "an experienced person, he has made significant contribution to football worldwide but I believe there is a time limit for everything. There is now a time for a new face and a new heir." Bin Hammam had supported Blatter's 1998 and 2002 presidential campaigns but admitted that he had fallen out with Blatter over issues within the FIFA Executive Committee. In August 2010 Bin Hammam had vowed not to run against Blatter saying that "I will be backing him to remain in office for a new mandate. He is my very good friend".

Bin Hammam said that FIFA should make voting for World Cups an open process where it was made public which bid executive members had voted for. If such a vote was public Bin Hammam said it would "cut the doubts in FIFA back to zero...I don't see any reason why we should not vote openly." He also vowed to limit the President of FIFA to a maximum of eight years in office.

On 25 May, following allegations by FIFA Executive Committee (ExCo) member Chuck Blazer, Bin Hammam was charged with offering bribes for votes and appeared before FIFA's ethics committee on 29 May. Bin Hammam withdrew from the presidential race the day before the ethics committee stating that "It saddens me that standing up for the causes that I believed in has come at a great price...I cannot allow the game that I love to be dragged more and more in the mud because of competition between two individuals. The game itself and the people who love it around the world must come first."

=== Blatter presidential campaign ===
The incumbent President of FIFA, Sepp Blatter ran for a fourth consecutive term, having been elected in 1998, and reelected in 2002 and 2007.

On 13 May Blatter warned that FIFA would be plunged into "a black hole" if Bin Hammam won the election. Of the vote Blatter said that "The ballot could lead to a seismic shift with irreversible damage...Quite simply, the survival of FIFA is at stake."

Before the election it was announced that the executive committee of the Confederation of African Football (CAF) had held a secret ballot at which they had passed a motion to support Blatter in the presidential election. However, the individual national federations that make up CAF are not obliged to follow the motion.

Blatter vowed that only "the FIFA family" could prevent his re-election as president on 1 June, and said that the congress of national federations will "decide if I am a valid or a non-valid candidate, or if I am a valid or non-valid president." Opening the congress Blatter said "I thought that we were living in a world of fair play, mutual respect and discipline...this is not the case any longer...because our pyramid of FIFA is suddenly unstable on its basis and there's a danger."

=== Voting results ===
61st FIFA Congress; June 1, 2011 – Zürich, Switzerland
| Candidate | Round 1 |
| (Switzerland) Sepp Blatter | 186 |
| against | 17 |

=== 2015 corruption case ===
Allegations of vote buying in the 2011 FIFA presidential election were included in the 2015 FIFA corruption case, which led to the arrests of fourteen FIFA and FIFA-related officials on 27 May 2015. These incitements were brought by the U.S. Department of Justice, as U.S. banks are alleged to have been used for money laundering and bribery.

== Ethics committee ==
An ethics committee took place on 29 May following allegations against FIFA vice-president Jack Warner, FIFA Executive Committee member Mohammed bin Hammam, as well as Caribbean Football Union (CFU) officials Debbie Minguell and Jason Sylvester.

The inquiry was launched after FIFA Executive Committee member Chuck Blazer reported to FIFA secretary general Jérôme Valcke that Bin Hammam had offered $40,000 of bribes to members of the Caribbean Football Union at a meeting organised by Warner from 10 to 11 May CFU officials Minguell and Sylvester were alleged to have witnessed the transaction. The vice-president of the Bahamas Football Association later produced photographic evidence of the alleged $40,000 bribe. In a submission Hammam admitted that he had borne the costs of travel and accommodation for the 25 members of the CFU, at a cost of $350,000.

Bin Hammam said of the allegations that "It is quite obvious that, following previous failed attempts, this is part of a final effort to prevent...(Bin Hammam) from running for the FIFA presidency." Bin Hammam also said that Blatter should be investigated on grounds that he knew of alleged bribe attempts and did nothing about it. It was announced by the committee that Blatter will not face an investigation due to lack of evidence.

Announcing the outcome of the bribery inquiry, deputy chairman of the committee Petrus Damaseb said that FIFA will open a "full-blown" investigation into allegations that Bin Hammam and Warner offered financial incentives to members of the CFU and provisionally suspended them from all football activity.

The committee also announced that the FA had cleared FIFA members Ricardo Teixeira and Worawi Makudi of allegations of bribery made by Lord Triesman relating to England's failed 2018 World Cup bid. The FA report into the allegations was published online on 30 May.

=== Aftermath ===
Bin Hammam's reaction

Reacting to the committees decision, Bin Hammam said that he would appeal against their decision to provisionally ban him from football related activity, saying that "The way these proceedings have been conducted is not compliant with any principles of justice." He also issued a statement calling for his reinstatement as well as responding to the claims in detail. Because of his suspension Bin Hammam was temporarily replaced as AFC by his deputy Zhang Jilong. Bin Hammam was later denied entry to the congress after being unable to file an appeal against his suspension in time.

Warner's reaction

As part of his suspension from football related activity Warner was suspended from the presidency of CONCACAF. Warner had warned on 28 May that FIFA faced a "football tsunami" in the next couple of days, "that will hit FIFA and the world that will shock you...The time has come when I must stop playing dead so you'll see it, it's coming, trust me. You'll see it by now and Monday...I have been here for 29 consecutive years and if the worst happens, the worst happens." He also said that he was not guilty of a "single iota of wrongdoing". On the 30th Warner disclosed the contents of an email that he had been sent by Jérôme Valcke in which Valcke discussed Bin Hammam's presidential campaign and appeared to accuse Qatar of "buying" the World Cup. Qatar were successful in their bid to host the 2022 World Cup. Valcke wrote "For MBH (Bin Hammam), I never understood why he was running...If really he thought he had a chance or just being an extreme way to express how much he does not like anymore JSB (Blatter). Or he thought you can buy FIFA as they (Qatar) bought the WC (World Cup)." Valcke confirmed the email and said that it had been selectively quoted. Valcke later commented that "When I refer to the 2022 World Cup in that email, what I wanted to say is that the winning bid used their financial strength to lobby for support...I have at no time made, or was intending to make, any reference to any purchase of votes or similar unethical behaviour." Qatar denied any wrongdoing and said that they were taking legal advice to consider their options. Bin Hammam responded to Valcke's allegations by saying "I don't know why he has said that...If I was paying money for Qatar you also have to ask the 13 people who voted for Qatar."

In the email Valcke added that it would be the 'coup de grace' if Warner were to announce his support for Blatter in the election. Warner refused to offer his support as president of CONCACAF. Warner also accused Blatter of recently using FIFA funds for political gain. Warner stated that at the Miami CONCACAF congress on 3 May Blatter made a gift of $1m to CONCACAF to "spend as it deems fit". Warner claimed this annoyed the President of UEFA Michel Platini who then approached Valcke complaining that Blatter had no permission from the finance committee to make this gift. Valcke replied that he would find the money for Blatter. Warner later urged the members of CONCACAF to support Blatter, as they had previously agreed to do. He also asked CONCACAF members not to protest the election on 1 June. Warner was reported by Blazer to Valcke for these activities on 31 May, as they violate the terms of his suspension by the ethics committee.

Other reactions

The President of the International Olympic Committee (IOC), Jacques Rogge said that the IOC had gone through similar problems during the 2002 Winter Olympic bid scandal. Rogge said that "The IOC ultimately emerged a stronger organisation...Our past calls for humility, and I will definitely not point the finger or lecture you. I'm sure Fifa can emerge stronger, and from within."

FIFA's sponsors voiced their concern at the corruption allegations. Coca-Cola described the allegations as "distressing and bad for the sport", Adidas said the "negative tenor of the public debate around FIFA at the moment is neither good for football nor for FIFA and its partners". Emirates said they were "disappointed" and Visa Inc. said that the "current situation is not good for the game"

Australian senator Nick Xenophon demanded that FIFA "refunds" the money the country spent on their unsuccessful bid for the 2022 World Cup, following the corruption allegations. Xenophon said that "It appears corrupt and highly questionable behavior goes to the core of FIFA...Australia spent almost $46 million on a bid we were never in the running for because bribes were being taken for votes. Now we hear that bribes may have been made to fix the result for who will head up FIFA."

The President of the German Football Association, Theo Zwanziger called for an investigation into the Qatar 2022 FIFA World Cup bid. Zwanziger said that "There is a considerable degree of suspicion that one cannot sweep aside...If FIFA behaves the way people expect, that is by clearly taking action against this cancerous tumour of bribery, then there is no need for these concerns...There is no end to the suspicions falling on members of the FIFA executive".
