= 51st FIFA Congress =

1998 football congress

1998 FIFA presidential election
- 8 June 1998
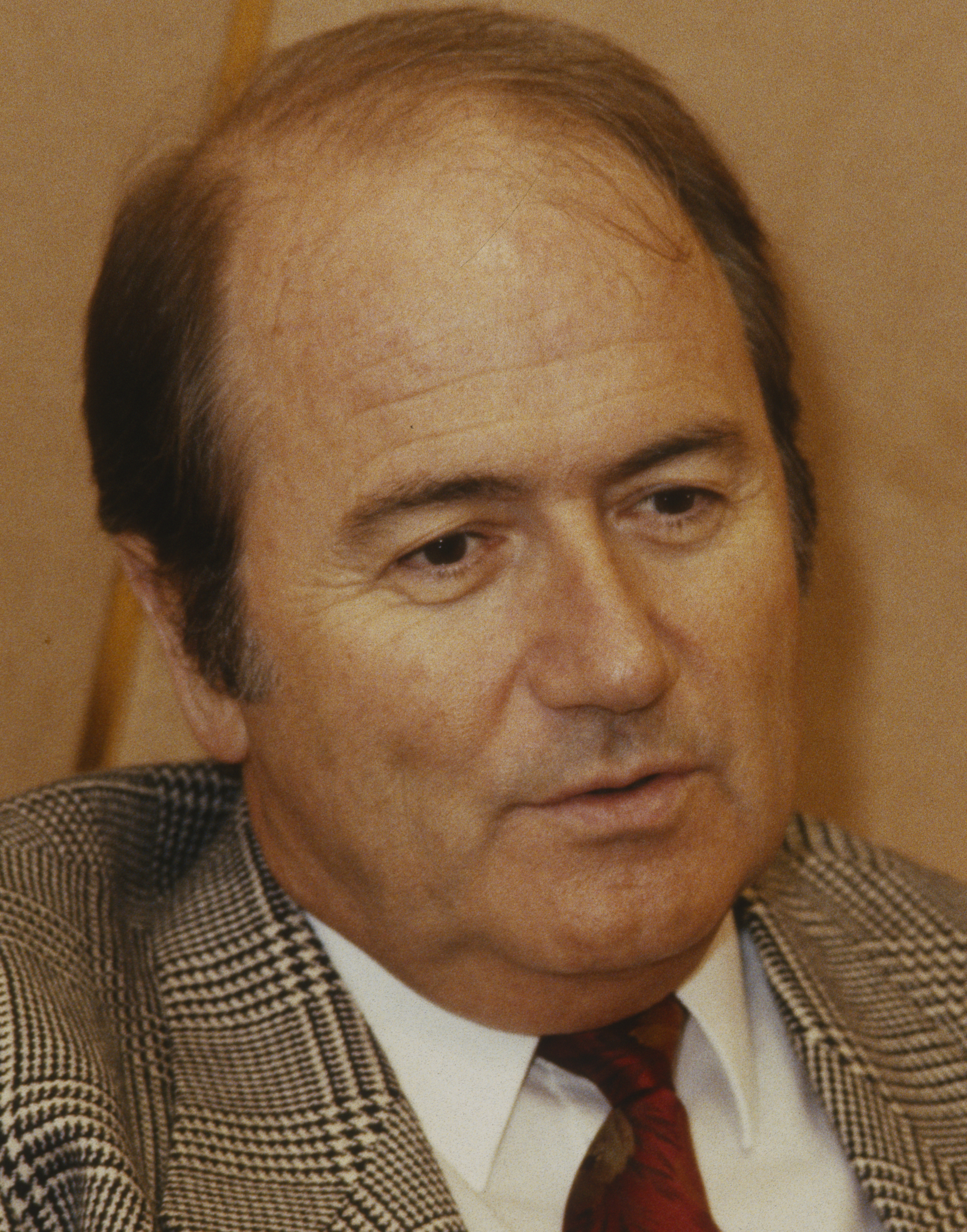

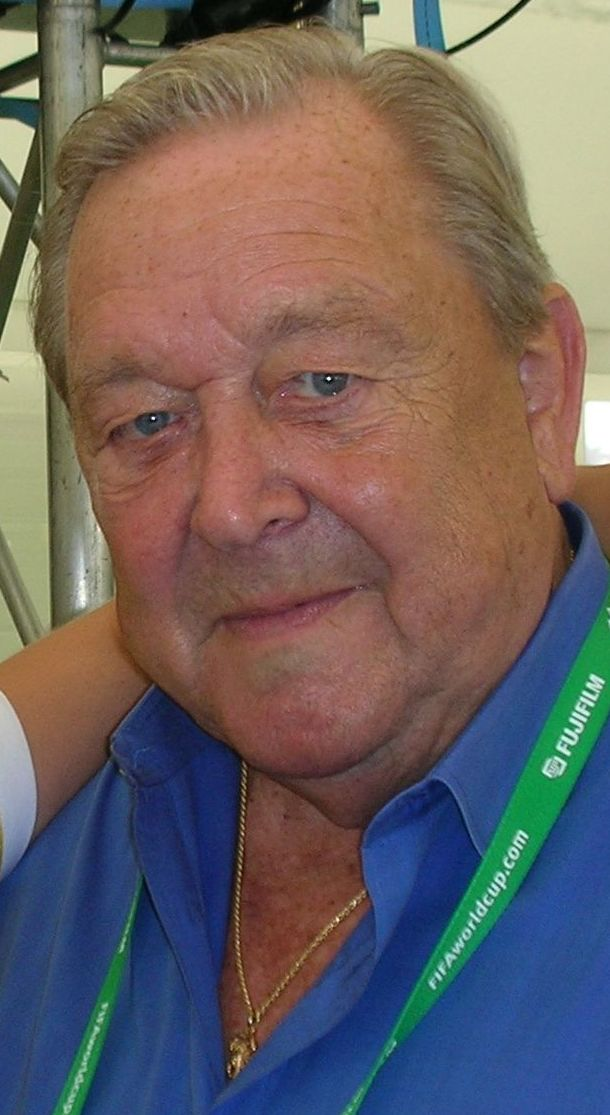
Candidate	Sepp Blatter	Lennart Johansson
Popular vote	111	80
Percentage	58.12%	41.88%
President before election
(Brazil) João Havelange
Next President
(Switzerland) Sepp Blatter

The 51st FIFA Congress was held between 6 and 8 June 1998, at the Equinox congress hall in Paris, France, just before the start of the 1998 FIFA World Cup. It was the last biannual meeting of the international governing body of association football FIFA, since 1998 the congress has been held on an annual basis. The congress saw the election of Joseph "Sepp" Blatter as the 8th President of FIFA who succeeded João Havelange. Havelange had held the presidency since 1974.

== 1998 presidential election ==
Voting for the presidential election took more than three hours, with the Swedish football administrator and president of the European football governing body UEFA Lennart Johansson considered the favourite to win. Johansson's rival was the Swiss-German football executive Joseph "Sepp" Blatter who had previously been an executive at the Swiss watch manufactures Longines and had served as the general secretary of FIFA since 1981. The first round of voting in the election did not produce an immediate victor (a two-thirds supermajority needed to avoid a second round), with Blatter receiving 111 votes to Johansson's 80, but Johansson conceded victory.

=== Voting results ===
51st FIFA Congress; 8 June 1998 – Paris, France
Candidate	Round 1	Round 2
(Switzerland) Sepp Blatter	111	Winner
(Sweden) Lennart Johansson	80	Withdrew
