= 2016 FIFA Extraordinary Congress =

Congress of football governing body

2016 FIFA presidential election
- 26 February 2016
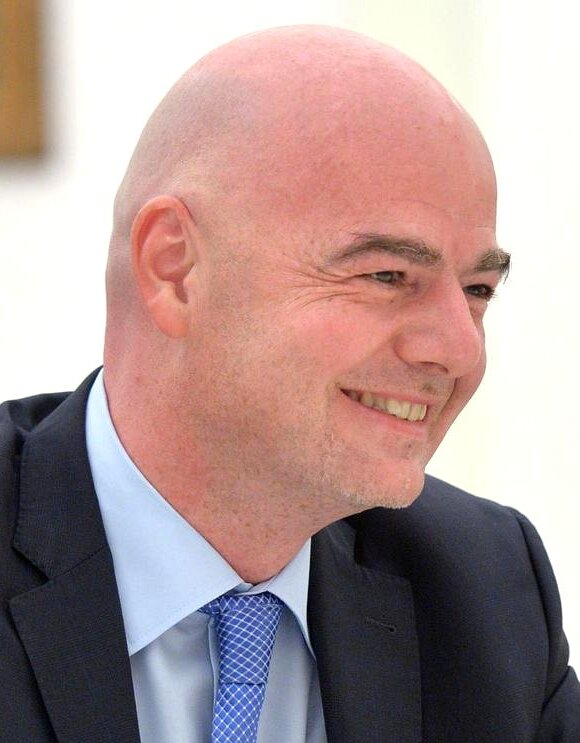

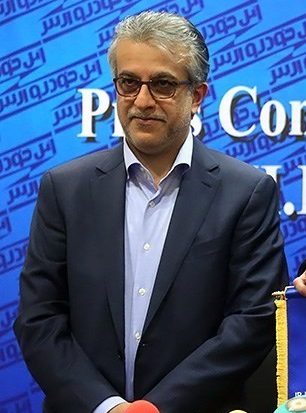

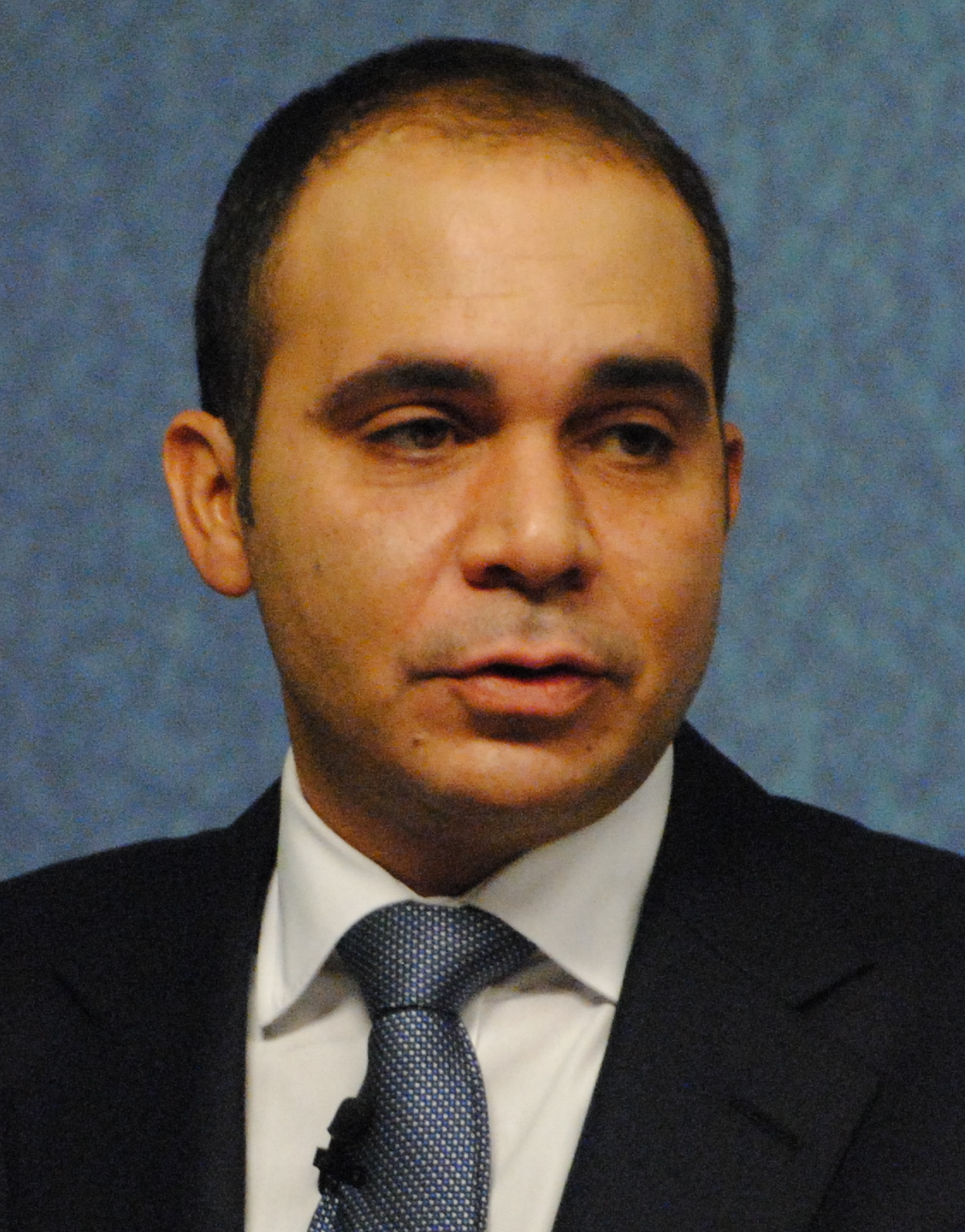
Candidate	Gianni Infantino	Salman Bin Ibrahim Al-Khalifa	Prince Ali bin Hussein
Popular vote	115	88	4
Percentage	56.10%	42.93%	1.95%
President before election
(Switzerland) Sepp Blatter
Next President
(Switzerland) (Italy) Gianni Infantino

The 2016 FIFA Extraordinary Congress was held at the Hallenstadion in Zürich, Switzerland, on 26 February 2016. This special session of the FIFA Congress, called as a result of the 2015 FIFA corruption case, included the passage of a major statutory reforms proposal as well as the election of Gianni Infantino to replace Sepp Blatter as the President of FIFA.

== Background ==
Amid a major corruption scandal at FIFA, incumbent Sepp Blatter was re-elected to a fifth term as FIFA President during the 65th FIFA Congress on 29 May 2015, defeating Prince Ali bin Hussein of Jordan. On 2 June, Blatter announced his intent to resign, remaining in office until an extraordinary FIFA Congress convened and elected a new president. An extraordinary congress was set for 26 February 2016 by the FIFA Executive Committee in July, who also announced the deadlines for candidates and other necessary procedures.

== Reform package ==
A "landmark" reform package was overwhelmingly approved during the first part of the session by 179 of 207 members. Among the promised tenants is the dissolution of the Executive Committee, to be replaced by a larger FIFA Council selected by regional confederations, as well as imposed term limits on executive offices such as the presidency.

== Presidential election ==
=== Candidates ===
The deadline for candidates to formally present their nominations, with support of at least five national federations, was 26 October 2015, 23:59 CET (22:59 GMT).

Sepp Blatter was also a likely candidate, despite him saying that "I will not be a candidate for the election in 2016." Blatter previously said that he is "not resigning" before the announcement of the election date.

On 28 October 2015, FIFA announced the names of the seven candidates to replace Sepp Blatter as its president.

==== List of eligible candidates ====
On 9 November 2015, the Ad-hoc Electoral Committee admitted and declared five candidates eligible to stand for election to the office of FIFA President.

- (Jordan) Prince Ali Al Hussein, FIFA Vice-President; runner-up in the previous election; re-announced his bid on 9 September 2015.
- (Bahrain) Salman Bin Ibrahim Al-Khalifa, President of the Asian Football Confederation; announced his bid on 15 October 2015.
- (France) Jérôme Champagne, former executive at FIFA from 1999 to 2010; announced his bid on 23 October 2015.
- (South Africa) Tokyo Sexwale, South African businessman; announced his bid on 25 October 2015. Sexwale withdrew his candidacy after giving his speech.
- (Italy) / (Switzerland) Gianni Infantino, UEFA General Secretary; announced his bid on 26 October 2015.

==== List of excluded candidates ====
- (France) Michel Platini, UEFA President; announced his bid on 29 July 2015; suspended by FIFA on 8 October 2015; excluded from the presidential race on 21 December 2015 due to corruption and accepting bribes.
- Musa Bility, President of the Liberia Football Association; announced his bid on 26 October 2015; excluded from the presidential race on 12 November 2015 after failing an integrity check.
- David Nakhid, former Trinidad and Tobago captain; announced his bid on 16 October 2015; excluded from the presidential race on 28 October 2015 for failing to receive the required five declarations of support.

==== Previously interested in bidding ====
- (Switzerland) Sepp Blatter, incumbent President, suspended by FIFA pending an investigation into ethics violations on 8 October 2015.
- (South Korea) Chung Mong-joon, South Korean businessman and politician, banned from footballing activity for six years on 8 October 2015.
- (France) Jérôme Valcke, suspended by FIFA pending an investigation into ethics violations on 8 October 2015.
- (Kuwait) Sheikh Ahmad Al-Sabah, Kuwaiti politician and president of the Olympic Council of Asia.
- (England) David Gill, British football executive (Manchester United and The Football Association).
- (Netherlands) Michael van Praag, Dutch football administrator.
- (Portugal) Luís Figo, retired Portuguese footballer.
- (Brazil) Zico, Brazilian coach and former footballer.
- Diego Maradona, former Argentina national team captain.
- (France) David Ginola, former French international player.
- (Nigeria) Segun Odegbami, retired Nigerian footballer.
- (Russia) Kirsan Ilyumzhinov, President of FIDE (international chess federation).

=== Results ===
The FIFA presidential election entered a second round of voting for the first time in 42 years after Gianni Infantino of Switzerland secured more votes than favourite Sheik Salman bin Ibrahim al Khalifa of Bahrain in the first round, but not enough votes for the two-thirds majority required to win. For the second round, a simple majority of more than 50 per cent (104 votes) was sufficient for victory and Infantino received 115 votes to win.

2016 FIFA Extraordinary Congress; 26 February 2016 – Zürich, Switzerland
Candidate	Round 1	Round 2
(Italy) / (Switzerland) Gianni Infantino	88	115
(Bahrain) Salman Bin Ibrahim Al-Khalifa	85	88
(Jordan) Prince Ali Al Hussein	27	4
(France) Jérôme Champagne	7	0
(South Africa) Tokyo Sexwale	Withdrew

=== Reactions ===
The unexpected victory of Infantino over Salman, named a heavy favorite in the lead-up to the election, surprised some observers; a bloc in opposition to Salman is speculated to have tipped the second round vote in Infantino's favor. United States Soccer Federation president Sunil Gulati and other CONCACAF federations played a key role in Infantino's margin of victory, reportedly shifting their vote from Prince Ali to Infantino after a series of conversations between the two rounds of voting.

The second round of voting was the first to be held since 1974.

The day prior to the election, Sepp Blatter gave a press interview in which he said that he was leaving the office "a happy man". Blatter later congratulated Infantino, but warned that he must stay vigilant and that in the job "friends become rare".
