= Prince Ali bin Hussein =

Jordanian royal (born 1975)

Prince Ali bin Al Hussein
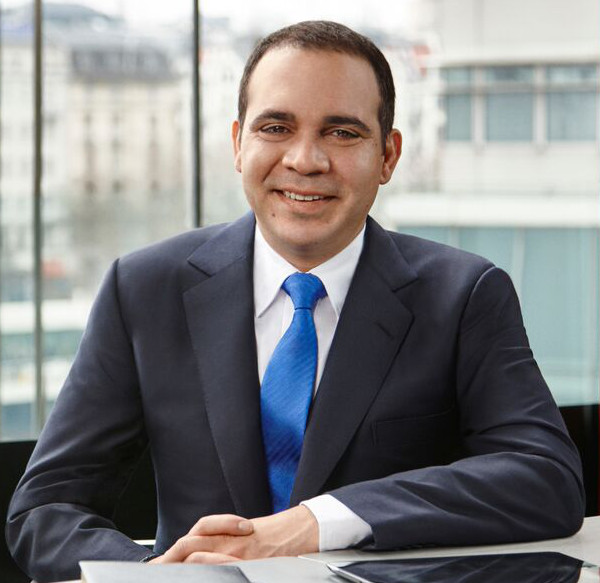
- Prince Ali in 2016
- Born: 23 December 1975 (age 50); Amman, Jordan
- Spouse: Rym Brahimi (m. 2004)
- Issue: Princess Jalilah; Prince Abdullah
Names
- Ali bin Al Hussein bin Talal bin Abdullah
- House: Hashemite
- Father: Hussein of Jordan
- Mother: Alia Toukan
- Occupation: President of the JFA; President of the WAFF; Vice president of FIFA

Prince Ali bin Al Hussein (Arabic: الأمير علي بن الحسين; born 23 December 1975) is the third son of King Hussein of Jordan, and the second child of the king by his third wife, Queen Alia. He is also the half brother of King Abdullah II. He is a member of the Hashemite family, which has ruled Jordan since 1921 and states to be a descendant of the Islamic prophet Muhammad.

In September 2015, Prince Ali announced his candidacy in the FIFA presidential election following Sepp Blatter's resignation.

== Early life and education ==
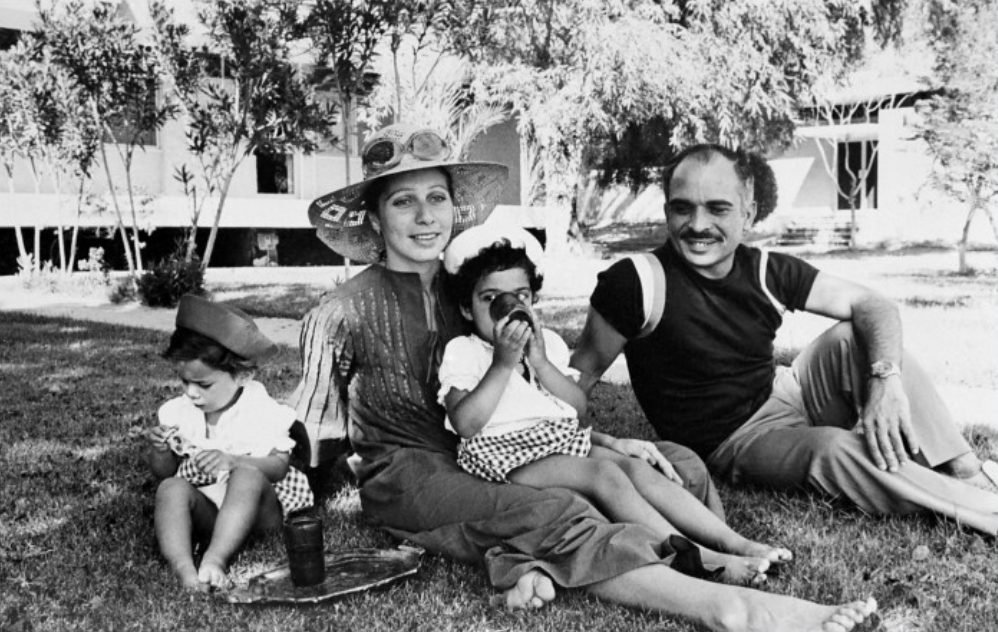
King Hussein and Queen Alia with their children Prince Ali and Princess Haya, 1976

Prince Ali began his primary education at the Islamic Educational College in Amman. He continued his studies in the United Kingdom, the United States and graduated from Salisbury School in Connecticut in 1993, where he excelled in wrestling.

Prince Ali is fluent in Arabic, English, and Circassian.

In 1998 Prince Ali went on a publicized horseback journey to the Caucasus (Circassia), from Jordan through Syria and Turkey, to raise awareness of the Circassian diaspora worldwide. The trip traced (in reverse) the path of the exodus that brought the Circassians to Jordan.

== Personal life ==
He is married to Rym Brahimi; they married on September 7, 2004. She is the daughter of Lakhdar Brahimi, former Algerian Minister for Foreign Affairs and senior UN official. She was raised in Great Britain and Algeria and was educated in France and the United States. They live in Amman with their two children Princess Jalila bint Ali and Prince Abdullah bin Ali.

== Career ==
In 1999, Prince Ali was asked to serve as commander of King Abdullah II′s Special Security in the Royal Guards. He served in that capacity until 28 January 2008, when the king entrusted Prince Ali with establishing and directing the National Centre for Security and Crisis Management. He is also the chairman of Jordan's Royal Film Commission - Jordan.

== Football ==
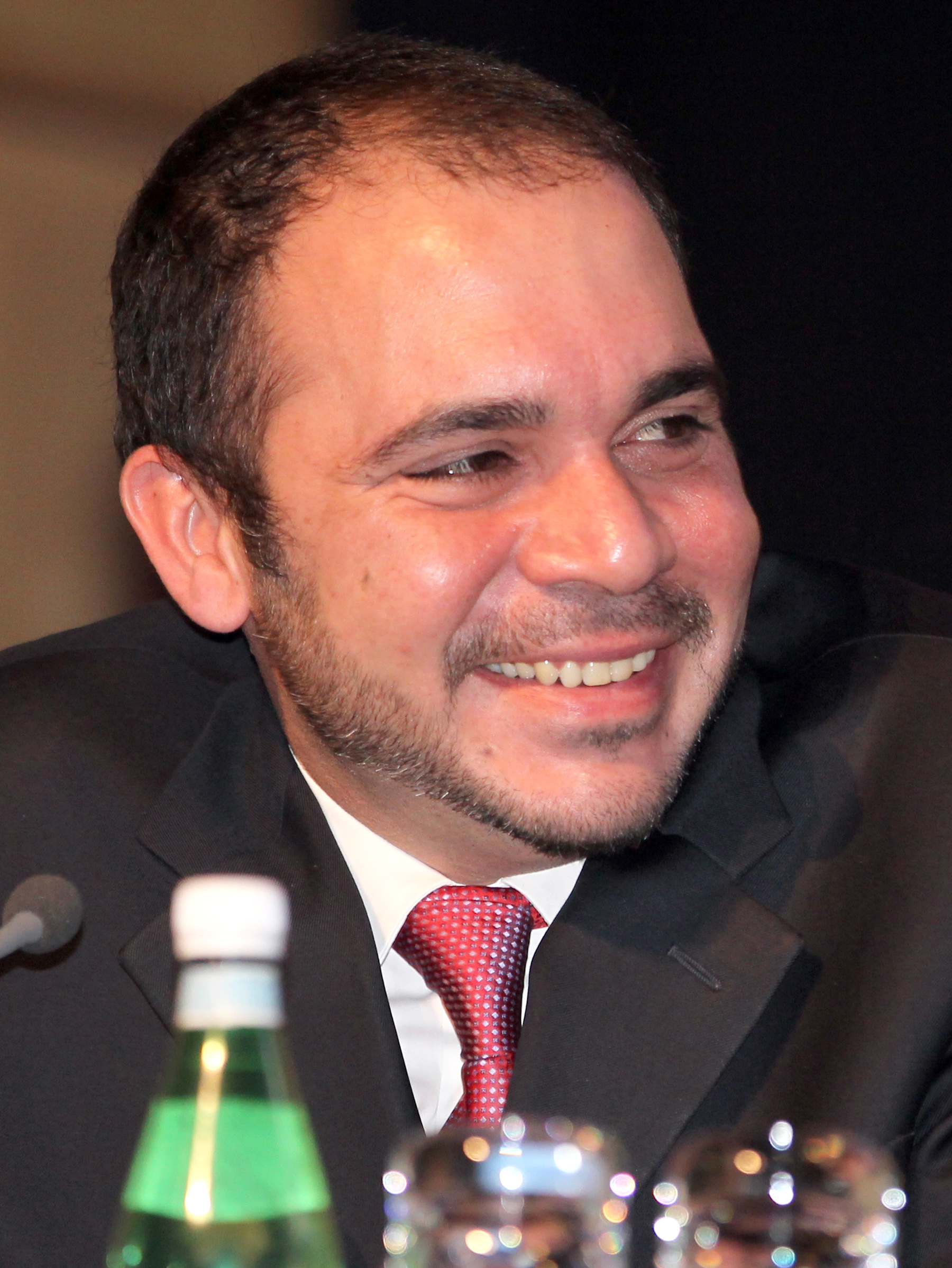
Prince Ali in 2012

Prince Ali is president of the Jordan Football Association. He is also the founder and president of the West Asian Football Federation, and under his presidency the membership has increased to 13 countries.

Prince Ali announced his candidacy for FIFA President, representing Asia, on 7 October 2010. Ali's campaign focused on change, football ideals, and uniting and raising the profile of Asian countries, within FIFA and generally. Prince Ali won the election for the position of FIFA vice president, representing Asia (25 votes to 20 for his opponent Dr Chung Mong-joon) at the AFC Congress in Doha, Qatar, on 6 January 2011. As FIFA vice president, Prince Ali served as a member of both the FIFA and AFC Executive Committees.

Prince Ali successfully championed the lifting of FIFA's ban on the hijab in women's football.

Ali was one of a number of FIFA officials to call for the publication of the Garcia Report into allegations of corruption surrounding Russia and Qatar's bids for the 2018 and 2022 FIFA World Cups.

in 2012, Prince Ali set up the Asian Football Development Programme (AFDP), a social enterprise focused on Asia and the Middle East which aimed to unite and transform communities through football, promoting respect and tolerance for others, fostering team spirit and developing talent.

Its achievements include reaching over 80,000 young people directly through its projects, training over 500 coaches, administrators and referees in refugee camps, schools and clubs; distributing 100,000 footballs to young people's programmes and organizations and completing 30 projects across 25 countries.

In October 2018, AFDP Global was launched at the Emirates Stadium in London. AFDP Global's mission is to extend this work to all regions of the world.

=== FIFA presidential campaigns ===
Ali lost the 2015 FIFA Presidency election to Sepp Blatter after resigning before second round voting took place. Blatter secured 60 more votes than Ali in the first round of voting, shy of the two thirds majority required to win in the first round, though with only a simple majority required in subsequent rounds Ali's defeat appeared to be inevitable.

However, following Blatter's announcement in June 2015 that he would resign from the post of FIFA president amid the ongoing corruption scandal, Ali announced in September 2015 that he would run for FIFA president again in the 2016 special election. Ali finished third in the first round behind Gianni Infantino and Salman Bin Ibrahim Al-Khalifa, polling 27 votes. In the second round, Ali again finished third behind the aforementioned duo, garnering a greatly reduced total of 4 votes.

== Honours ==
=== National ===
- Jordan
  - Knight Grand Cordon of the Supreme Order of the Renaissance, Special Class
  - Knight Grand Cordon of the Order of the Star of Jordan
  - Knight Grand Cordon of the Order of Independence
  - Knight Officer of the Order of Military Merit
  - Knight of the Decoration of the Hashemite Star
  - Recipient of the Al-Hussein Medal of Excellence, 2nd Class
  - Recipient of the Administrative & Leadership Competence Medal
  - Recipient of the Administrative & Technical Competence Medal
  - Recipient of the Administrative & Training Competence Medal

=== Foreign ===
- Austria: Grand Decoration of Honour in Gold with Sash of the Decoration of Honour for Services to the Republic of Austria
- Denmark: Grand Cross of the Order of the Dannebrog
- France: Knight of the Order of the Legion of Honour
- Germany: Grand Cross 1st Class of the Order of Merit of the Federal Republic of Germany
- Japan: Grand Cordon of the Order of the Rising Sun
- Sweden:
  - Commander Grand Cross of the Royal Order of the Polar Star
  - Recipient of the 50th Birthday Medal of King Carl XVI Gustaf
- Netherlands: Grand Cross of the Order of Orange Nassau
- Pahang, Malaysia: The Highest Esteemed Royal Family Order of Pahang (DK II)

== Military grades ==
Prince Ali holds the rank of brigadier in the Jordanian Armed Forces.

Royal titles
Preceded by Prince Muhammad bin Faisal	Line of succession to the Jordanian throne 7th position	Succeeded by Prince Abdullah bin Ali
