= Sepp Blatter =

Swiss football administrator (born 1936)

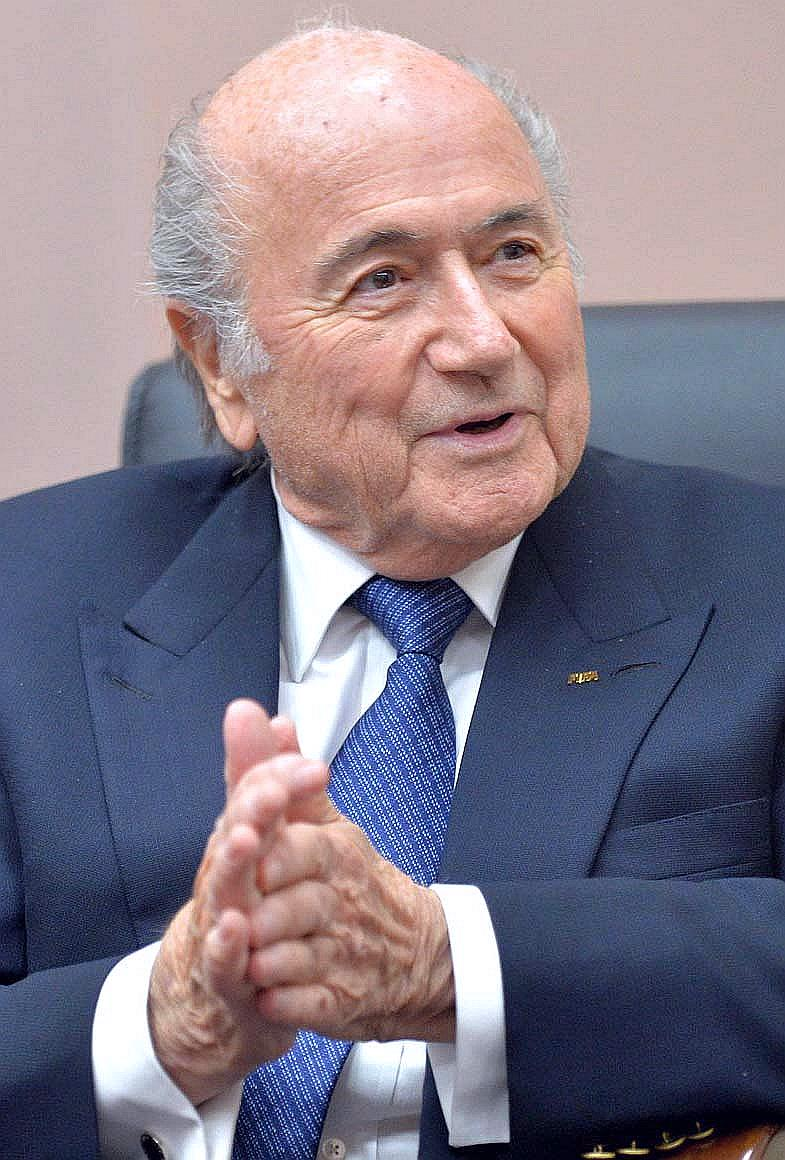
- Blatter in 2015

8th President of FIFA
- In office 8 June 1998 – 21 December 2015
- Preceded by: João Havelange
- Succeeded by: Issa Hayatou (acting); Gianni Infantino

Secretary General of FIFA
- In office June 1981 – 8 June 1998
- Preceded by: Helmut Käser
- Succeeded by: Michel Zen-Ruffinen

Personal details
- Born: Josef Blatter; 10 March 1936 (age 90) Visp, Valais, Switzerland
- Spouse(s): Liliane Biner (divorced) Barbara Käser (m. 1981; died 1991) Graziella Bianca (m. 2002; div. 2004)
- Domestic partner(s): Ilona Boguska (1995–2002); Linda Barras (2014–2019)
- Children: 1
- Education: University of Lausanne

Joseph Sepp Blatter (born Josef Blatter; 10 March 1936) is a Swiss former football administrator who served as the eighth president of FIFA from 1998 to 2015. He has been suspended from participating in FIFA activities since 2015 as a result of the FIFA corruption case made public that year, which remains in place until 2027.

From a background in business, public relations, and sports administration, Blatter became general secretary of FIFA in 1981 and was then elected president at the 51st FIFA Congress on 8 June 1998, succeeding João Havelange, who had headed the organization since 1974. Blatter was re-elected in 2002, 2007, 2011, and 2015. Like his predecessor Havelange, Blatter built his power base in FIFA by increasing the influence of numerous African and Asian countries in world football through the expansion of participating teams in various FIFA tournaments, culminating in the highly controversial awarding of the 2022 World Cup to Qatar. Although he has persistently been dogged by claims of corruption and financial mismanagement, Blatter's reign oversaw a vast expansion in revenues generated by the FIFA World Cup.

On 2 June 2015, six days after the United States government indicted several current and former FIFA officials and sports marketing companies for bribery and money laundering, Blatter announced that he would call for elections to choose a new president of FIFA and that he would not stand in these elections, but he also said he would remain in his position until an extraordinary FIFA Congress could be held for his successor to be elected. Criminal proceedings were announced against Blatter by the Swiss Attorney General's office on 25 September 2015, regarding "criminal mismanagement... and misappropriation".

In October 2015, Blatter and other top FIFA officials were suspended amid the investigation, and in December the independent FIFA Ethics Committee ejected Blatter from office and banned him from taking part in any FIFA activities over the following eight years. On 24 February 2016, a FIFA appeals committee upheld the suspension but reduced it from eight years to six. On 24 March 2021, he received a second ban for six years and was fined the amount of CHF 1,000,000 by the body's Ethics Committee after a probe into massive bonus payments. Issa Hayatou served as the acting President of FIFA until an extraordinary FIFA Congress was held in late February 2016, electing Gianni Infantino as the 9th president of FIFA.

== Early life ==
Blatter was born in Visp in the Swiss canton of Valais with the given name of Josef. He studied in Saint Maurice, before getting a degree in business and economics from the University of Lausanne in 1959. Blatter has had a long and varied career, including posts such as head of public relations for the tourist board of his native canton, as well as general secretary of the Swiss Ice Hockey Federation.

Blatter was Director of Sports Timing and Relations of Longines S.A., and was involved in the organization of the 1972 and 1976 Olympic Games.

== FIFA ==
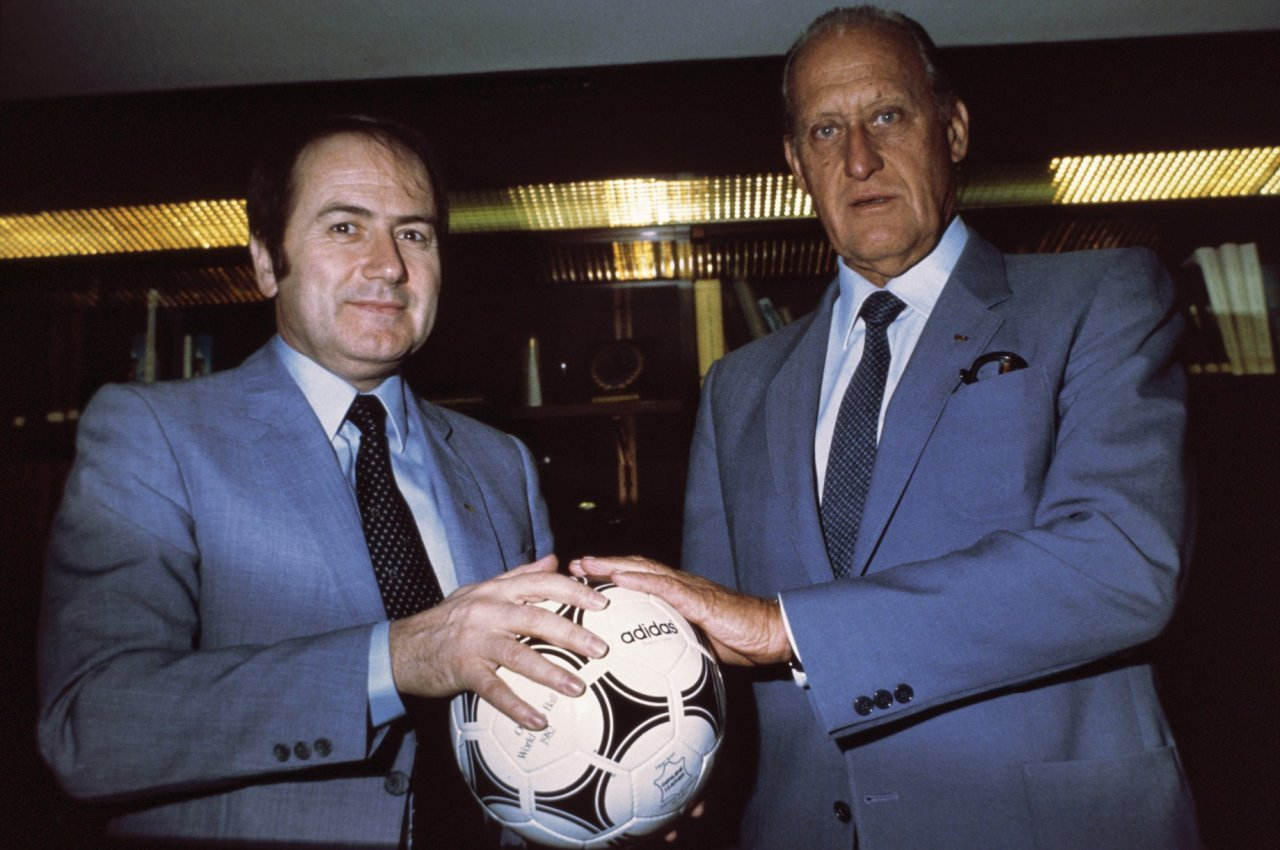
Blatter (left) with João Havelange, President of FIFA (April 1982)

From 1975 onwards, Blatter worked at FIFA, first as technical director (1975–1981), then general secretary (1981–1998), before his election as FIFA president in 1998. He was re-elected as head of FIFA in 2002, and was re-elected unopposed for another four years on 31 May 2007, even though only 66 of 207 FIFA members nominated him.

Blatter and FIFA were often dogged by controversy and allegations of corruption. His tenure saw controversy over allegations of financial mismanagement and the acceptance of bribes resulting in Qatar's successful 2022 World Cup bid.

Blatter has attracted criticism from the media, senior football figures and players, due to controversial statements. These include the claim that Latin American countries would applaud John Terry for having an extramarital affair, and that on-field racism could be corrected with a handshake, among others. He also drew criticism at the 2014 FIFA World Cup seeding, when he interrupted a "one-minute silence" for former South-African president Nelson Mandela, who died the day before, after eleven seconds. Michael van Praag, the chairman of the Royal Dutch Football Association, called his behavior "preposterous" and expressed the hope Blatter would not be reelected in 2015.

Blatter has been publicly heckled, at the World Cup in Seoul and the Confederations Cup in Frankfurt, both in 2002 and 2005, in his home town of Visp in 2011, at the 2012 Women's Olympic Football Final Medal Ceremony, and at the opening of Confederations Cup match in 2013. In order to avoid protest, no speeches were given at the 2014 FIFA World Cup.

=== 1998 election ===
Blatter's 1998 election to the presidency of FIFA over UEFA President Lennart Johansson occurred amidst much controversy. Blatter's 2002 candidacy was marked with rumours of financial irregularities and backroom dealings, culminating with direct accusations of bribery, by a third party, made in the British press by Farra Ado, vice-president of the Confederation of African Football and president of the Somali Football Federation, who claimed to have been offered $100,000 to vote for Blatter in 1998.

=== 2004 Comments on women's football ===
In 2004, Blatter said during an interview in the Swiss newspaper Sonntagsblick, when asked how to increase the popularity of women's football, "Let the women play in more feminine clothes like they do in volleyball. They could, for example, have tighter shorts. Female players are pretty, if you excuse me for saying so, and they already have some different rules to men - such as playing with a lighter ball. That decision was taken to create a more female aesthetic, so why not do it in fashion?" His comments resulted in heated responses.

=== 2006 FIFA World Cup ===
In the 2006 FIFA World Cup, after a controversial second-round match between Portugal and the Netherlands, which saw referee Valentin Ivanov issue a record 16 yellow cards and four red cards, Blatter was said to have lambasted the officiating referee, and said that Ivanov should have given himself a yellow card for his poor performance as a referee. He later said he regretted his words and promised to officially apologise to Ivanov. The apology was never given, and the referee was removed from further officiating.

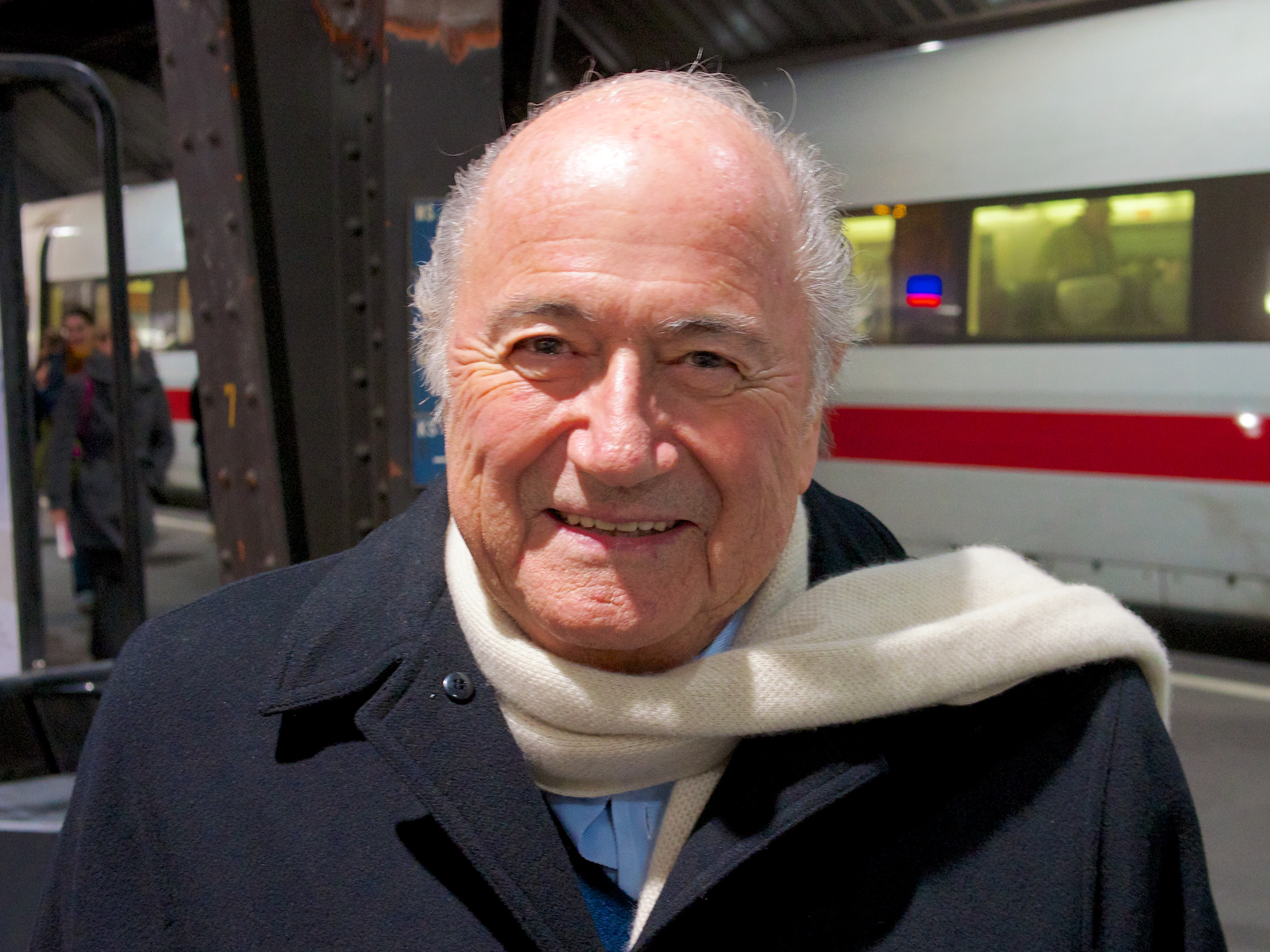
Blatter at Zürich Hauptbahnhof in November 2013

=== Foreign 'over-representation' on club teams ===
Blatter was criticized in 2007 and 2008 for trying to change European Union employment law regarding the number of foreign players that football clubs could field at any one time. His plans were to set a restriction of five foreign players and having six players from the said team's own nationality. Blatter believed this would help the countries' national sides by having more national players playing in their leagues.

Blatter has often referred to the English Premier League as one of the major problems in football and used it as an example, due to the influence of foreign players, coaches and owners in the top teams.

=== World Cup's chosen sites ===
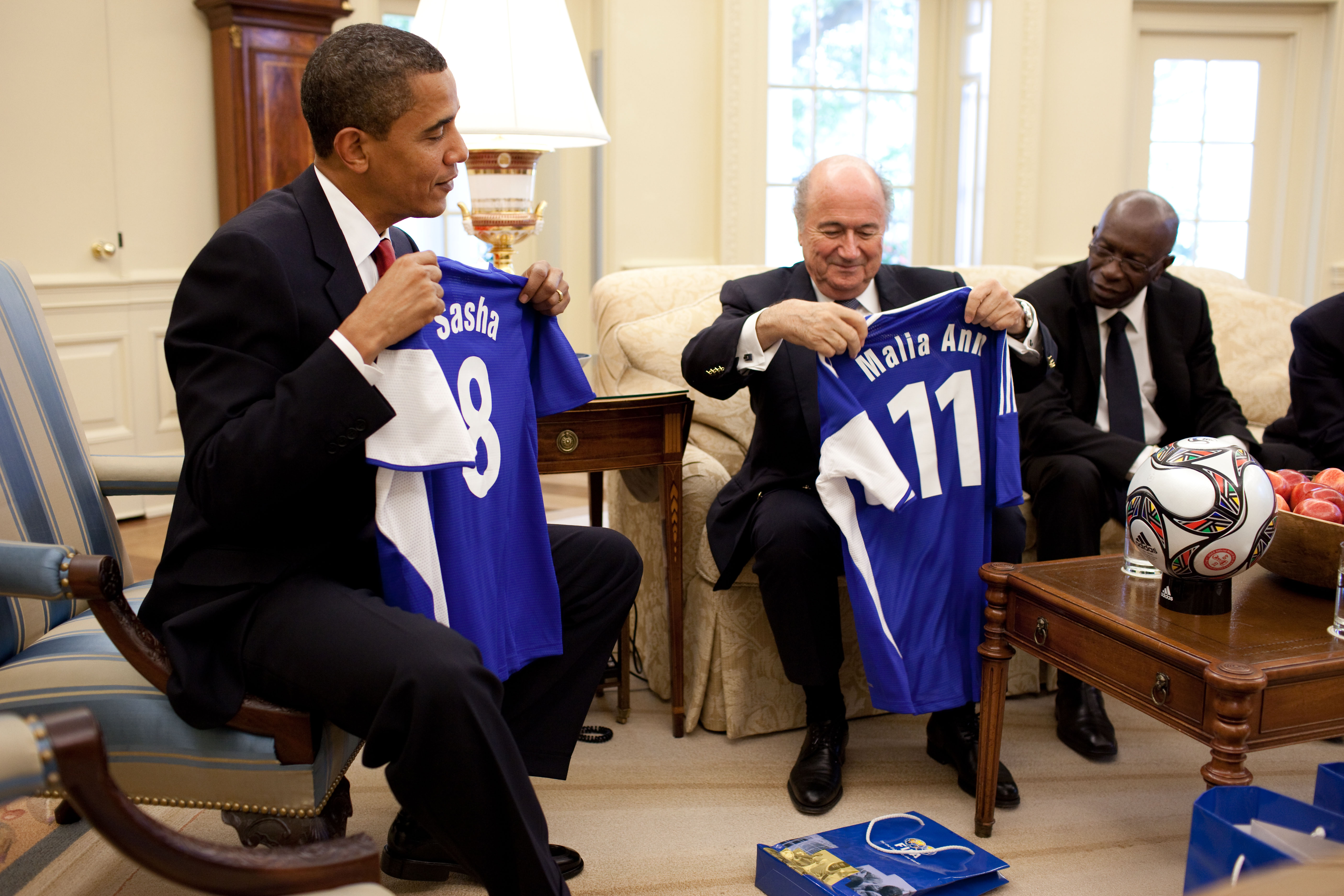
Blatter with Barack Obama and Jack Warner. In the vote for the 2018 and 2022 FIFA World Cups, U.S. President Obama said that FIFA made "the wrong decision" in awarding Qatar the tournament in 2022.

It was reported that Blatter had "cut an unofficial deal with UEFA head Michel Platini" to ensure Europe would receive the 2018 World Cup, such that if the non-European bids did not withdraw from 2018 "they will find themselves frozen out and not given any backing by the FIFA High Command, damaging their chances of being serious contenders for the second tournament."

Eleven bids were submitted in March 2009 covering 13 nations. Mexico and Indonesia withdrew. Five of the remaining nine bids—South Korea, Qatar, Japan, Australia and the United States—were only for the 2022 World Cup, while all the others were bidding for both the 2018 and 2022 World Cups. Because all of the bids for the 2018 World Cup were from European nations, and FIFA's rules dictate that countries belonging to confederations that hosted either of the two preceding tournaments are not eligible to host, the bids of England, Russia, Netherlands/Belgium and Spain/Portugal were forced to be for 2018 only.

=== Technological assistance ===
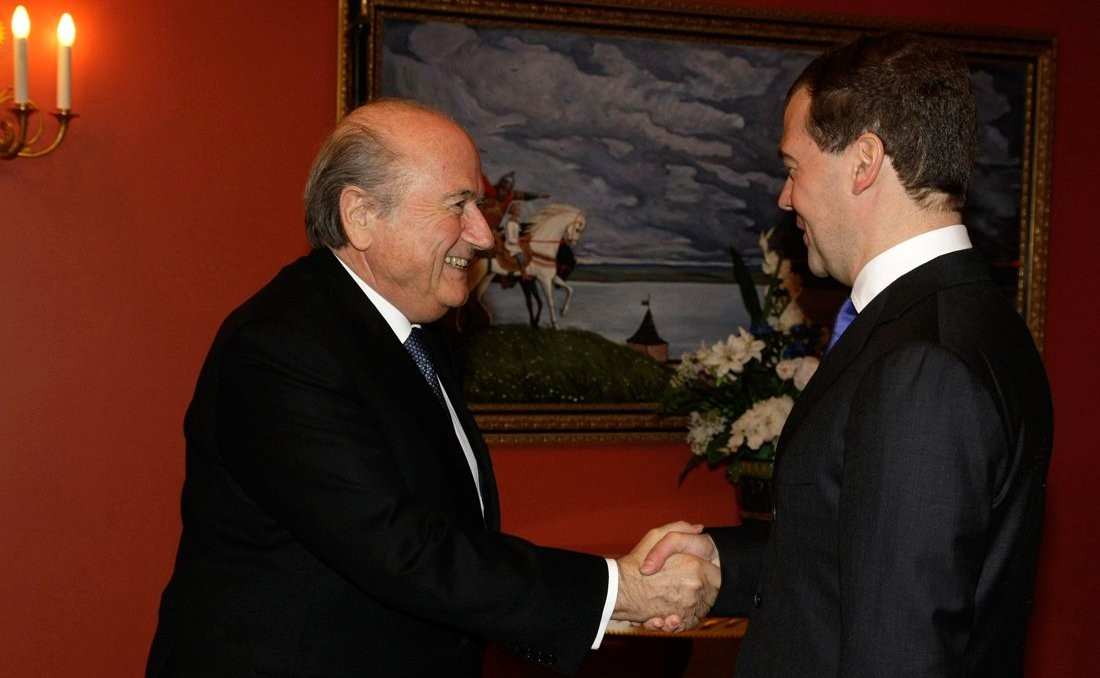
Blatter with Russian President Dmitry Medvedev

The criticism attracted by Blatter's refusal to allow goal-line technology or video replays intensified following the controversial Frank Lampard disallowed goal in the match between England and Germany on 27 June 2010.

Two days later, Blatter stated that he deplored the "evident referee mistakes" in the England v Germany and Mexico v Argentina matches, and apologised to the English Football Association and the Mexican Football Federation (the two organizations directly concerned by the referees' mistakes), acknowledging that Lampard had indeed scored against Germany and that Tévez's goal against Mexico had been scored from an offside position.

He added: "It is obvious that after the experiences so far at this World Cup it would be a nonsense not to re-open the file on goal-line technology. […] We will come out with a new model in November on how to improve high level referees. […] I cannot disclose more of what we are doing but something has to be changed."

=== 2011 FIFA presidential election ===
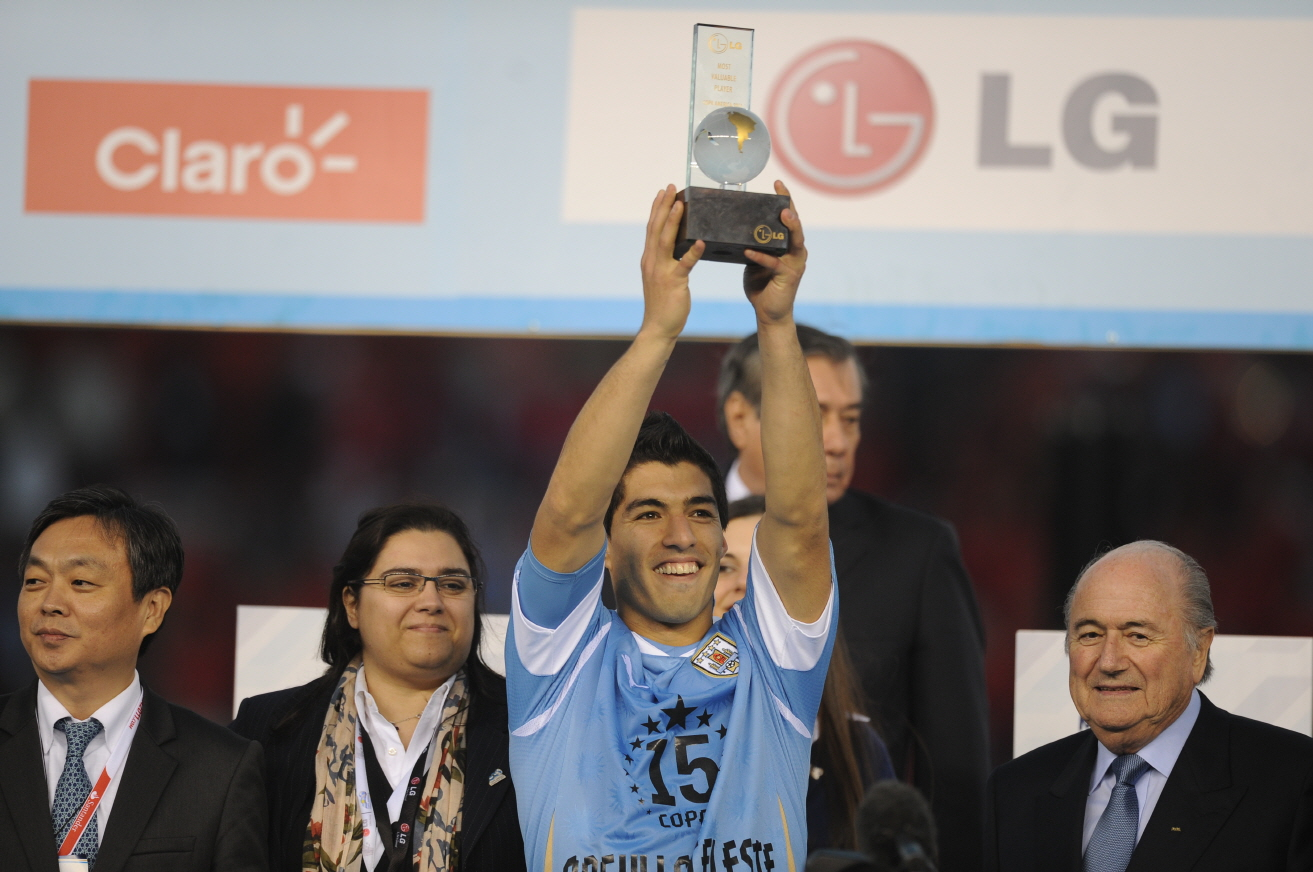
Blatter (right) with Luis Suárez, the Player of the Tournament of the 2011 Copa América

In 2011, elections were scheduled for the FIFA presidency, in which Blatter was again the incumbent candidate, running for a fourth consecutive term. The ChangeFIFA organisation, on 29 March 2011, endorsed former Chilean defender and for three years running South American Footballer of the Year Elías Figueroa as candidate for the presidency, urging national federations to nominate him, but, subsequently, Figueroa decided not to accept the nomination, stating that "in such a short period of time" he could not develop a case "worthy of the magnitude and importance of such a distinguished job"

The vote took place at the 61st FIFA Congress in Zurich. The only other candidate, Mohammed bin Hammam of Qatar, withdrew from the presidential race on 28 May, just before the vote. Bin Hammam had supported Blatter's 1998 and 2002 presidential campaigns, but admitted that he had fallen out with Blatter over issues within the FIFA Executive Committee. The FIFA ethics committee that investigated bribery claims against Bin Hammam and CONCACAF head Jack Warner announced that Blatter will not face an investigation into claims that he knew of the bribery and did nothing about it, because of a lack of evidence.

Blatter criticised the International Olympic Committee (IOC), stating FIFA manage their finances "like a housewife", after the IOC announced it would look into allegations of corruption against Issa Hayatou, president of the Confederation of African Football.

There being no other nominations, Blatter ran unopposed in the ensuing presidential election and was re-elected for a fourth term, with 186 of the 203 votes cast. In his campaign, Blatter had stipulated that, if re-elected in 2011, he would not run again for president. Blatter received criticism for not postponing his 2011 election in which his term as FIFA President was extended through 2015, despite the fact that all other candidates for the role had been suspended or withdrew.

=== Allegations of financial mismanagement ===
Amidst internal divisions, FIFA's secretary-general Blatter's deputy and former protégé Michel Zen-Ruffinen drew up a 30-page dossier outlining allegations of financial mismanagement within the organisation. The dossier alleged that the collapse of FIFA's marketing partner ISL had led to losses of up to 100 million US dollars under Blatter's management.

The allegations were backed by Johansson, and the dossier was handed to the Swiss authorities, but they cleared Blatter of any wrongdoing and FIFA had to pay all the costs. An internal investigation within FIFA was halted by Blatter because members of it broke confidentiality agreements. This questionable behaviour led him to remove Zen-Ruffinen from office immediately before the 2002 FIFA World Cup.

In April 2012 the Council of Europe published a report which stated it would be "difficult to imagine" that Blatter would have been unaware of "significant sums" paid to unnamed FIFA officials by ISSM/ISL in connection with lucrative contracts for World Cup television rights and the subsequent bankruptcy and collapse of ISL in 2001. The Council of Europe report will be considered by over 300 parliamentarians from the 47 Council of Europe member states in Strasbourg.

=== Awarding of 2018 and 2022 World Cup ===
Controversy came in the British press when Russia was awarded the 2018 event, with England receiving just two of their "promised" votes; this controversy was dismissed by Blatter as the English showing themselves to be "bad losers". The awarding of the 2022 games to Qatar was also controversial. The illegality of homosexuality in the nation caused Blatter to joke that "I would say they [gay fans] should refrain from any sexual activities", which brought criticism from retired basketball player John Amaechi and gay rights groups.

=== 2013 FIFA Ethics Committee investigation ===
On 29 April 2013, FIFA's Ethics Committee concluded its investigation into allegations of illegal payments to FIFA officials from the organisation's former marketing partner International Sports and Leisure (ISL), which went bankrupt in 2001, and published its report.

FIFA president Sepp Blatter was cleared of any misconduct, but his predecessor, Brazilian João Havelange, resigned as FIFA's honorary president over his part in the scandal, since Havelange along with former FIFA Executive Committee members Ricardo Teixeira and Dr. Nicolás Leoz were found to have accepted illegal payments between 1992 and May 2000. A week before FIFA's ethics committee announced its findings, 84-year-old Leoz had resigned from his post as president of the South American Football Confederation, citing "health reasons".

Blatter, in a statement, "note[d] with satisfaction" that the report "confirms that 'President Blatter's conduct could not be classified in any way as misconduct with regard to any ethics rules'." He added he has "no doubt that FIFA, thanks to the governance reform process that [Blatter] proposed now has the mechanisms and means to ensure that such an issue does not happen again", though admitting that the scandal "has caused untold damage to the reputation of [FIFA]."

=== 2015 FIFA presidential election, controversy and resignation ===
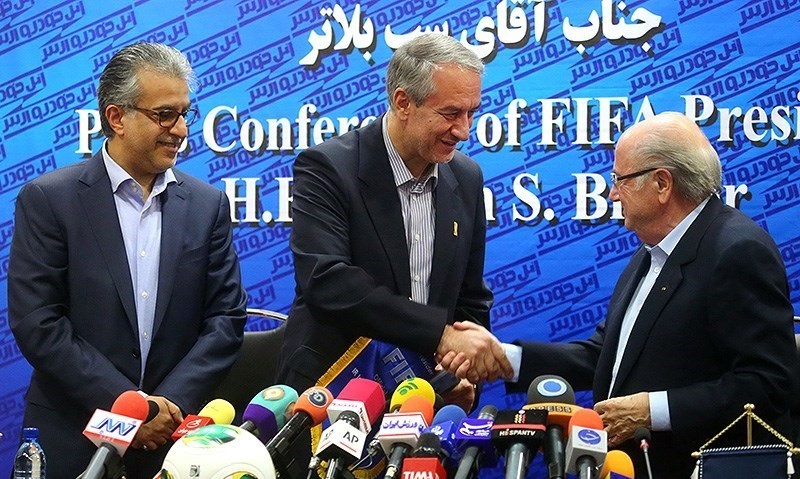
Blatter in a press conference with Presidents of Asian Football Confederation Salman Bin Ibrahim Al-Khalifa and Football Federation Islamic Republic of Iran Ali Kafashian in Tehran

In 2015, elections were scheduled for the FIFA presidency, in which Blatter was again the incumbent candidate, running for a fifth consecutive term. Prince Ali bin Hussein was his opponent in the election.

The vote took place at the 65th FIFA Congress in Zürich on 29 May 2015. Neither party received the necessary two-thirds majority of votes from the first round with Blatter receiving 133 to Prince Ali's 73. According to FIFA rules, a second round should have been held for the two candidates, with a simple majority being sufficient for victory. However, before the second round of voting commenced, Prince Ali announced his withdrawal, handing Blatter victory by default.

On 2 June 2015, FIFA abruptly called a press conference at their Zürich headquarters, where Blatter announced that he would resign from the post of FIFA president amid the ongoing corruption scandal.

During the news conference he said: "My mandate does not appear to be supported by everybody" and announced an extraordinary congress scheduled "as soon as possible" to elect his successor. Blatter announced that he would remain in office until his successor could be elected at the extraordinary congress, likely to be held some time between December 2015 and March 2016. He continued with the words: "While I have a mandate from the membership of FIFA, I do not feel that I have a mandate from the entire world of football—the fans, the players, the clubs, the people who live, breathe, and love football as much as we all do at FIFA".

Subsequently, on 26 June Blatter prompted speculation that he might be preparing to renege on this resignation, when he was quoted as saying that "I have not resigned, I put my mandate in the hands of an extraordinary congress". This seemed to contradict his comments from 2 June 2015. He was further quoted as saying that he resigned "to take away the pressure from FIFA and my employees, including [pressure] from the sponsors". Reports speculated that it appears that Blatter will step down at the "extraordinary congress" though the situation remains vague.

On 25 September, Swiss investigators announced that they were investigating Blatter in relation to payments made to UEFA president Michel Platini. While Blatter and Platini denied any impropriety around the payments, major FIFA sponsors Coca-Cola, Visa Inc., McDonald's, and Budweiser issued public statements requesting that he resign for the good of FIFA.

On 8 October 2015, he was suspended from FIFA for 90 days while investigations into payments made to Michel Platini were conducted. FIFA said in a statement: "The grounds for these decisions are the investigations that are being carried out by the investigatory chamber of the ethics committee." On 21 December, FIFA's ethics committee banned both Blatter and Platini from football for eight years. In February 2016, a FIFA appeals committee upheld the suspension but reduced it from eight years to six. Platini appealed to the European Court of Human Rights, which rejected his appeal.

On 22 December 2020, FIFA filed a criminal complaint against Blatter relating to his role in the FIFA Museum project.

On 24 March 2021, Blatter received a second ban for six years and was fined the amount of CHF 1,000,000 by the body's Ethics Committee after a probe into massive bonus payments.

On 2 November 2021, Blatter was formally charged by Swiss authorities for fraud and falsifying documents in connection with the improper payments to Platini. Blatter and Platini were cleared of the charges eight months later. Despite the verdict having been appealed by Swiss federal prosecutors, Blatter and Platini were acquitted a second time in March 2025.

=== Post FIFA ===
Blatter has been critical of football's leadership since his departure from FIFA, specifically criticising FIFA president Gianni Infantino and UEFA president Aleksander Čeferin. Blatter noted that when he had started working in FIFA, the organization was poor and was not the powerhouse it is today and admits he played a major role in the commercialisation of football, which has led to an increase in non-sports sponsors. Blatter stated that awarding the 2022 FIFA World Cup to Qatar was a mistake. Blatter has been critical of the expansion and creation of tournaments like the FIFA World Cup, UEFA Champions League, UEFA Europa League, UEFA Conference League, FIFA Club World Cup, and UEFA Nations League and has warned that oversaturation, rising costs, and fan violence could cause interest in football to drop. Blatter also criticised the awarding of the 2030 FIFA World Cup to six countries in three continents (Argentina, Morocco, Paraguay, Portugal, Spain, and Uruguay), stating the tournament would lose its identity. Blatter also criticised the 2034 FIFA World Cup in Saudi Arabia, saying that it would go against the human rights and democracy that make up FIFA's values while giving Saudi Arabia increasing influence in football as well as the bidding process for both 2030 and 2034 that was designed to favor Saudi Arabia. Blatter also supported a boycott of the 2026 FIFA World Cup matches in United States due to tensions between the Trump administration and the rest of the world. He cited concerns over the Trump administration's restrictive immigration policies and the treatment of protesters and migrants as reasons fans should avoid travelling to the tournament and raised questions about the suitability of the United States as a host nation. Blatter also criticized FIFA Forward Enterprise, a plan to sell the operations of FIFA's tournaments to a third party, claiming that the relationship between Infantino and US President Donald Trump had reached a "financial dimension" that was damaging to football and arguing that nobody had the right to sell the sport.

Blatter was a member of the committee for the Swiss Neutrality Initiative (vote in September 2026).

== Sexual assault allegation ==
In November 2017, American goalkeeper Hope Solo accused Blatter of sexual assault at the FIFA Ballon d'Or awards in 2013. During an interview with the Portuguese newspaper Expresso, Solo stated she "had Sepp Blatter grab my ass" just before the two presented an award together to Abby Wambach. She stated she "was in shock and completely thrown off. I had to quickly pull myself together to present my team-mate with the biggest award of her career and celebrate with her in that moment, so I completely shifted my focus to Abby." Blatter's spokesman Thomas Renggli stated "This allegation is ridiculous."

== Honours ==
Blatter has been the recipient of numerous awards, medals, honorary degrees, and citizenships from nation states, sport governing bodies, special interest groups, universities and cities.

Blatter's honorary degree from De Montfort University was revoked by the institution in October 2015, as it had previously been given in recognition of his ethical conduct.

== Post-FIFA presidency ==
In 2019, in an interview with the UOL website, Blatter once again stated that he considered Palmeiras a world club champion. “We must recognize that Palmeiras was the first world club champion, and that’s the end of the matter. It was the first,” said the former executive. Blatter was FIFA president in 2014, when former Sports Minister (and Palmeiras supporter) Aldo Rebelo announced that he had received confirmation from the organization that Palmeiras was the first world club champion, referring to the club’s victory in the 1951 Copa Rio.

In 2026, Blatter publicly criticized the organization of that year's FIFA World Cup, amid controversies surrounding the event and Gianni Infantino's growing closeness to Donald Trump. He said that the World Cup had lost "credibility" and called for new leadership at FIFA. Blatter also criticized the FIFA Forward Enterprise initiative to commercialize the World Cup, stating: "Football belongs to no individual and to no institution. It belongs to the people," Blatter, 90, told Reuters. He also stated that FIFA would lose its "soul" if the proposal went ahead.

== Personal life ==
In 1981, Blatter changed the spelling of his first name from Josef to Joseph. He later adopted his nickname, Sepp, as his middle name.

Blatter's first wife was Liliane Biner. The couple had a daughter, shortly after which they divorced. In 1981, Blatter married Barbara Käser, the daughter of Helmut Käser, Blatter's predecessor as secretary general of FIFA. Their marriage lasted ten years until Barbara died from complications after an operation. In 1995, Blatter began dating Ilona Boguska, a Polish friend of his daughter Corinne, before they separated in 2002.

Blatter married for a third time on 23 December 2002, to Graziella Bianca, a dolphin trainer who was a friend of his daughter. Their marriage ended in divorce in 2004. From 2014 to 2019, Blatter was in a domestic partnership with Linda Barras.

Blatter was raised as a Catholic.

== See also ==
- United Passions, a 2014 film starring Tim Roth as Blatter
- 2026 Trump–FIFA red card controversy
