= Salman bin Ibrahim Al Khalifa =

Bahraini football administrator (born 1965)

Salman Ibrahim Al Khalifa
- سلمان بن ابراهيم آل خليفة
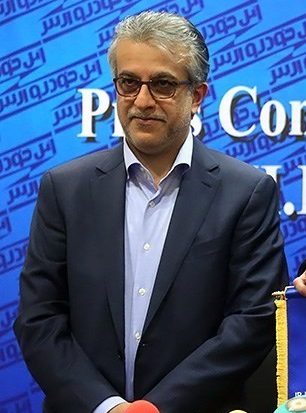
- Al Khalifa in 2014

Senior Vice President of FIFA
- Incumbent
- Assumed office 8 April 2018
- President: Gianni Infantino
- Preceded by: David Chung

10th President of Asian Football Confederation
- Incumbent
- Assumed office 2 May 2013
- Preceded by: Zhang Jilong (acting)

President of Bahrain Football Association
- In office 2 October 2002 – 1 May 2013
- Preceded by: Abdulrahman Sayyar
- Succeeded by: Ali bin Khalifa Al Khalifa

Personal details
- Born: Salman bin Ibrahim Al Khalifa; November 2, 1965 (age 60) Bahrain
- Education: University of Bahrain
- Occupation: Football administrator

Sheikh Salman bin Ibrahim Al Khalifa (Arabic: سلمان بن ابراهيم آل خليفة; born 2 November 1965) is a Bahraini football administrator. As of 2023, he is Senior Vice-president of the FIFA Council. He has been president of the Asian Football Confederation (AFC) since 2 May 2013. Before becoming president of the AFC, he had been president of Bahrain Football Association (2002–13), chairman of the AFC Disciplinary Committee, and deputy chairman of the FIFA Disciplinary Committee.

He is member of the House of Khalifa, the royal family of Bahrain, and has been accused of involvement in the crackdown on dissidents since the Arab Spring in Bahrain. He has denied these allegations.

== Early life and education ==
Salman bin Ibrahim Al Khalifa was born on 2 November 1965 in Bahrain. He is a member of the royal family of Bahrain. He is the second son of Ibrahim bin Hamad al-Khalifa and Aisha bint Salman al-Khalifa, daughter of Salman bin Hamad Al Khalifa I, the ruler of Bahrain from 1942 until his death in 1961.

He graduated from the University of Bahrain in 1992 with a bachelor's degree in English literature and history.

== Football ==
=== Riffa SC ===
Salman has been involved in football for many years, dating back to the early 1980s when he played a few years in the youth team of Bahrain Division I team, Riffa Club.

=== BFA ===
Since leaving Riffa Club to focus on his academic studies, Salman has held executive positions at the Bahrain Football Association (BFA). In 1996, he became chairman of the national team. In 1998, he was elected vice-president of the BFA, and president in 2002, a post he held until 2013, when he assumed a new post at the AFC.

Salman was president of the Bahrain Football Association at time of the "golden era" of Bahraini football. The national team was a match away from qualifying to the 2006 FIFA World Cup and 2010 FIFA World Cup. The team also managed to reach the 2004 Asian Cup semi-final, the furthest the national team has ever reached in the continental championship. The national team FIFA ranking also reached its highest in the history of Bahraini Football, as it moved up to the 44th position.

=== AFC ===
In May 2013, Salman was elected president of the Asian Football Confederation (AFC), which also made him a member of the FIFA Executive Committee. Soon after his election he changed the AFC constitution, which led to Prince Ali bin Al Hussein of Jordan losing his seat as an Asian representative on the FIFA Executive Committee and caused a rift between the two men.

On 6 April 2019, Salman was elected for a second full term as AFC President for the term 2019–2023, supported by Football Federation Australia despite concerns about his human rights record being raised by former socceroo Craig Foster, Professional Footballers Australia, and others.

He was re-elected for another term as AFC President in February 2023 until 2027.

=== FIFA ===
Salman has held the post of co-chairman of the disciplinary Committee of the FIFA World Cups, the FIFA Beach Tournaments, and the FIFA Club Championships. He was deputy chairman of the FIFA disciplinary committee at Beijing in 2008. He became a member of the FIFA Executive Committee in 2013, as president of the AFC.

On 15 October 2015, he announced his candidature for president of FIFA after the election of February 2016. Despite being touted as a favourite, he was defeated by UEFA general secretary Gianni Infantino. This was attributed in part to his alleged involvement in the brutal suppression of pro-democracy protesters in Bahrain since the Arab Spring in Bahrain in 2011.

Since 6 April 2018, Salman has been a member of the FIFA Council, and as of September 2023 is senior vice-president, and also Chair of the FIFA Development Committee.

== Effects on women's football ==
Although the problems of women's football in Iran and Afghanistan slowed down the development of football in the Middle East and Central Asia, he paid attention to women's football in these countries. In an example, he visited one of the women's football academies in Iran. However, women's football problems in Iran were still reported.

== Allegations of human rights breaches ==
Human rights defender groups such as Human Rights Watch, Human Rights in Bahrain, and the Bahrain Institute for Rights and Democracy, have said that Salman headed a committee that was tasked with identifying international Bahraini footballers and other athletes who were, involved in the 2011 Bahraini uprising during the Arab Spring. Many were imprisoned and/or tortured.

Prince Nasser issued a royal decree permitting the army to establish military courts to deal with democracy protesters in the Arab Spring, at which time Salman was general secretary of the supreme sports and youth council. He then headed a committee which was set up to investigate "breaches by individuals associated with the sports movement during the recent unfortunate events in the Kingdom of Bahrain". The BFA (then headed by Salman) threatened punishments for those who had participated in the protests, or any other act that aims to "overthrow the regime or insult national figures". Around 150 athletes and administrators were arrested under the decree, and some alleged that they had endured torture during their detention. After initially refusing to answer questions and maintaining silent about his role, Salman has since denied allegations of being involved in human rights abuses, calling them "false, nasty lies".

Some athletes, such as Hakeem al-Araibi, who had played for the national team, fled the country during subsequent purges in the years following. He has always maintained that Salman knew about the torture. Al-Araibi became the subject of an international human rights campaign (#savehakeem) in early 2020, and three years later a documentary film, after he was detained in Thailand, where he had gone with his wife for a holiday, following the issue of an Interpol red notice issued by Bahrain.

Civic offices
Preceded by Abdulrahman Sayyar	President of Bahrain Football Association; 2002–2013	Succeeded by Ali bin Khalifa Al Khalifa
Preceded by Zhang Jilong	President of Asian Football Confederation; 2013–present	Succeeded by Incumbent
