= United Passions =

- Theatrical release poster
- Directed by: Frédéric Auburtin
- Screenplay by: Frédéric Auburtin; Jean-Paul Delfino
- Produced by: Louisa Maurin; Christine Gozlan
- Starring: Gérard Depardieu; Sam Neill; Tim Roth
- Cinematography: Inti Briones
- Edited by: Olivier Gajan
- Music by: Jean-Pascal Beintus
- Production companies: Leuviah Films; Thelma Films
- Distributed by: TF1 International
- Release dates: 18 May 2014 (Cannes); 5 June 2015 (United States)
- Running time: 110 minutes
- Country: France
- Language: English
- Budget: US$32 million
- Box office: $168,832

United Passions (French: United Passions: La Légende du football, literally United Passions: The Legend of Football, also known as United Passions: The Birth of the World Cup) is a 2014 English-language French drama film. It is about the origins of the world governing body of association football, Fédération Internationale de Football Association (FIFA). Ninety-percent funded by FIFA, it stars Tim Roth, Gérard Depardieu and Sam Neill, and is directed by Frédéric Auburtin. It premiered at the Cannes Film Festival on 18 May 2014.

The film's North American release on 5 June 2015 was particularly unsuccessful, coinciding with the 2015 FIFA corruption case. In the United States, the film grossed $918 in its opening weekend, was lambasted by critics as propaganda, and is considered to be one of the worst films ever made. The film was also a major box-office bomb, losing $26.8 million worldwide and failing to obtain theatrical distribution in many markets.

== Plot ==
In 1905, after the English football federation rejects an offer to join the formation of an international governing body for football, Robert Guérin forms FIFA, and makes himself the first president. Years after its formation, it is all but unknown. Jules Rimet, then president of FIFA, publicly mocks Uruguay's victory in the 1924 Summer Olympic football games, hoping that this audacious move will make FIFA more publicly visible. However, the media does not publish his mockery. Still optimistic, he decides that the only way to make themselves known is to organize a truly international tournament: the World Cup.

Rimet is at the point of giving up organizing the World Cup due to a lack of funds until he receives an unexpected letter from Enrique Buero. Buero and his South American ties will fund the first World Cup, hoping that in doing so, it will make Uruguay and other South American countries more well-known. Rimet and Buero collude to award the first World Cup to Uruguay. In 1930, Uruguay wins the first World Cup. Rimet remains president of FIFA, working through the Great Depression, looming war, and disagreement among FIFA members; Rimet would organize the 1938 World Cup but would fail to do so in 1942 and 1946 due to World War II.

After the war, Rimet organized two more World Cups in 1950 and 1954. The World Cup and FIFA after the war grew significantly, with many new members joining in many parts of the world. After many years, FIFA fell under João Havelange, voted into power using expensive trips and various modern lobbying tactics. Havelange sees FIFA as an organization in financial disarray and works to find various sponsors to finance its operation. Throughout his tenure as the president of FIFA, he has a right-hand man, Sepp Blatter, who impresses Havelange with his unrelenting work. Eventually, Blatter becomes the next president of FIFA.

Corruption within FIFA builds up over the years from Havelange's expansion efforts. As president of FIFA, Blatter is tasked to clean this up, for which he is seen as a controversial president. Many FIFA officials attempt to vote him out of office because of how incorruptible he is. In a 2006 vote, Blatter is able to retain his presidency by cowing the corrupt members of FIFA, threatening to expose their ill deeds if they do not endorse Blatter and his anti-corruption campaign by voting for him as the FIFA president.

The film ends with Blatter announcing South Africa as the host nation for the 2010 World Cup.

== Cast ==
- Tim Roth as Sepp Blatter
- Gérard Depardieu as Jules Rimet
- Sam Neill as João Havelange
- Fisher Stevens as Carl Hirschmann
- Thomas Kretschmann as Horst Dassler
- Martin Jarvis as Sir Stanley Rous
- Bruce Mackinnon as Louis Muhlinghaus
- Anthony Higgins as Lord Kinnaird
- Nicholas Gleaves as Henri Delaunay
- Antonio de la Torre as Enrique Buero
- Serge Hazanavicius as Robert Guérin
- Benn Northover as Max Kahn
- Antony Byrne as Frederick Wall
- Conor Mullen as Ivo Schricker
- Pippo Delbono as Ottorino Barassi
- Steven Elder as Rodolphe Seeldrayers
- Jemima West as Annette Rimet
- Sean Campion as Werner Lutzi
- Jason Barry as Edgar Willcox
- Richard Dillane as Larsen
- Andrew French as Moussa Sougou
- Julian Miller as Ludwig Sylow
- Dawn Bradfield as Francesca Guillermod
- Natasha Mashkevich as Corinne Blatter

== Production ==
Principal photography took place in Switzerland, Azerbaijan, France and Brazil. The opening scene was shot at a stadium in the Azerbaijani village of Sahil.

FIFA wanted the film finished for release in the summer of 2014, ahead of the FIFA World Cup in Brazil. The film's script was completed in four months. FIFA's original title suggestions for the film were Men of Legend and The Dreammakers.

According to Howler Magazine, $27 million of the film's budget came directly from FIFA while the remaining $5 million came from the Azerbaijani government.

At the time of the film's Cannes premiere, star Gérard Depardieu presented director Frédéric Auburtin as "the right man" for the film, due to his passion for football. The two shared a long history of collaboration, with Auburtin previously serving as assistant director, and later director, on projects starring Depardieu, and as co-director on films directed by the actor.

== Release ==
The film's United States release coincided with the 2015 FIFA corruption case, in which several current and former members of FIFA's executive committee were arrested for charges of corruption. The corruption investigation led to the resignation of FIFA's president, Sepp Blatter, following decades of speculation and accusations of corruption at FIFA under his leadership.

The film was accused of ignoring these long-running claims. Roth has said that he asked the filmmakers: "Where's all the corruption in the script? Where is all the back-stabbing, the deals?" He said he attempted to convey these elements through his performance, saying: "It was a tough one. I tried to slide in a sense of it, as much as I could get in there." The film's director, Frédéric Auburtin, claimed he inserted "ironic parts" into the film.

Prior to its release, comedian John Oliver lampooned the film in a segment on his show Last Week Tonight, saying that the "movie, like FIFA itself, looks terrible" and asking, "Who makes a sports film where the heroes are the executives?" The film also faced criticism from the media concerning the £16 million cost of production, more than the annual turnover of most of FIFA's national associations.

== Reception ==
=== Box office ===
The film was made on a budget of between $25–32 million, with the Los Angeles Times reporting an estimated budget of $29 million. Roughly £17 million (about USD$27 million; 90% of the total budget) was financed by FIFA. The film was reported to have lost around $26.8 million due to its poor theatrical returns.

In North America, the film was an instant box office bomb. It opened on Friday, 5 June 2015, and grossed a mere $319 on its opening day from 10 theatres in New York City, Los Angeles, Washington, D.C., Phoenix, Kansas City, Miami, Minneapolis, Houston, Dallas, and Philadelphia, followed by an even worse $288 on Saturday. For its three-day opening (Friday-to-Sunday), it grossed only $918—the worst opening of all time for a film opening in 10 to 15 theatres in U.S. box office history.

The FilmBar theatre in Downtown Phoenix reported a gross of $9, indicating that only one person bought a ticket to see the film. The film was withdrawn from cinemas by its distributor, Screen Media Films, following its appalling opening weekend performance at the box office. In North America, it ended up becoming the lowest-grossing film of all time, surpassing the previous record held by I Kissed a Vampire ($1,380) in 2012.

For the film's screening at the Zurich Film Festival on 5 October 2014, about 120 people paid $22.70 per ticket to view the film in a 500-seat cinema. Overall, the highest revenue outside of North America came from Russia and the CIS (£144,000), Portugal (£4,000) and Serbia (£2,000), while the revenues from Hungary, Slovenia, Switzerland and Ukraine were minimal. In France, the film was released straight to DVD.

=== Critical response ===
On Rotten Tomatoes, the film has an approval rating of 0%, with an average rating of 1.8/10, based on 18 reviews. On Metacritic, the film has a score of 1 out of 100, based on 9 critics, indicating "overwhelming dislike". It is regarded as one of the worst films ever made, and it was also given the site’s Moldy Tomato award for the worst-reviewed film of 2015. The film has been criticized for the poor quality of the drama, the unsuitability of the topic of administrative matters for a movie and the perceived biases of the film, with The Guardian describing it as "cinematic excrement" and "self-hagiography", and others calling it a "cringeworthy, self-aggrandizing affair", and "astonishingly crass".

Several reviewers commented on the irony of the portrayal of Blatter in the film as an anti-corruption campaigner. Sara Stewart of the New York Post described it as "hilariously ill-timed", while Paul Field of the Daily Mirror said that this created "unintentional comedy gold".

Writing in the London Evening Standard, Des Kelly described United Passions as "the worst movie ever made" and "the most extraordinary vanity exercise; a vile, self-aggrandizing, sugar-coated pile of manure where Blatter and Co. manage to make North Korea's Kim Jong-un look self-effacing".

Daniel M. Gold of The New York Times said that United Passions is "one of the most unwatchable films in recent memory, a dishonest bit of corporate-suite sanitizing that's no good even for laughs". In a later interview, Gold said it would make the top three of his list of all-time bad films.

=== Response from cast and crew ===
Auburtin, in his first interview since the film's disastrous US opening in June 2015, told The Hollywood Reporter that he tried to strike a balance between "a Disney propaganda film [and] a Costa-Gavras/Michael Moore movie", but the project ultimately tipped in FIFA's favour. He added, "Now I'm seen as bad as the guy who brought AIDS to Africa or the guy who caused the financial crisis. My name is all over [this mess], and apparently, I am a propaganda guy making films for corrupt people."

Roth, who has not seen the film and has declined repeated requests to speak about the film, confessed in May 2015, before the scandal broke, to the German newspaper Die Welt: "Yeah, I apologize I didn't question the director, I didn't question the script. This is a role that will have my father turning in his grave". He admitted that he took the role for the money, saying it helped him out of a "financial hole", and added: "[B]ut you know what? The hole FIFA has dug for itself is so deep, they'll never get out of it". Roth also added in a Reddit AMA regarding taking the role that "I had two kids in college so I had to make a decision and it was probably poorly judged but once you make that decision you have to follow through", but added, "I am glad I did it for my family."

Jason Barry, who plays an investigative reporter in the film, said in an interview that, like Roth, he had not watched it. "It's incredibly unusual for a non-studio to put that much money into a film with no distribution or anything already in place … no pre-sales, no sales done on Cannes," he said, adding that "some of my dialogue was cut because [Blatter] didn't like the tone of the way I was asking some of the questions. And let's be honest, in the script I'm not asking anything intense in any way shape or form. It makes Blatter out to be what Blatter thinks he is—the shining beacon of world football. It was a vanity project for FIFA."

=== Accolades ===
United Passions received the Barry L. Bumstead Award during the 36th Golden Raspberry Awards, a special category for critical and financial failures that were not given an eligible release.

== See also ==
- List of association football films
- List of 21st century films considered the worst
- List of films with a 0% rating on Rotten Tomatoes
