= Headquarters =

Command center for an organization

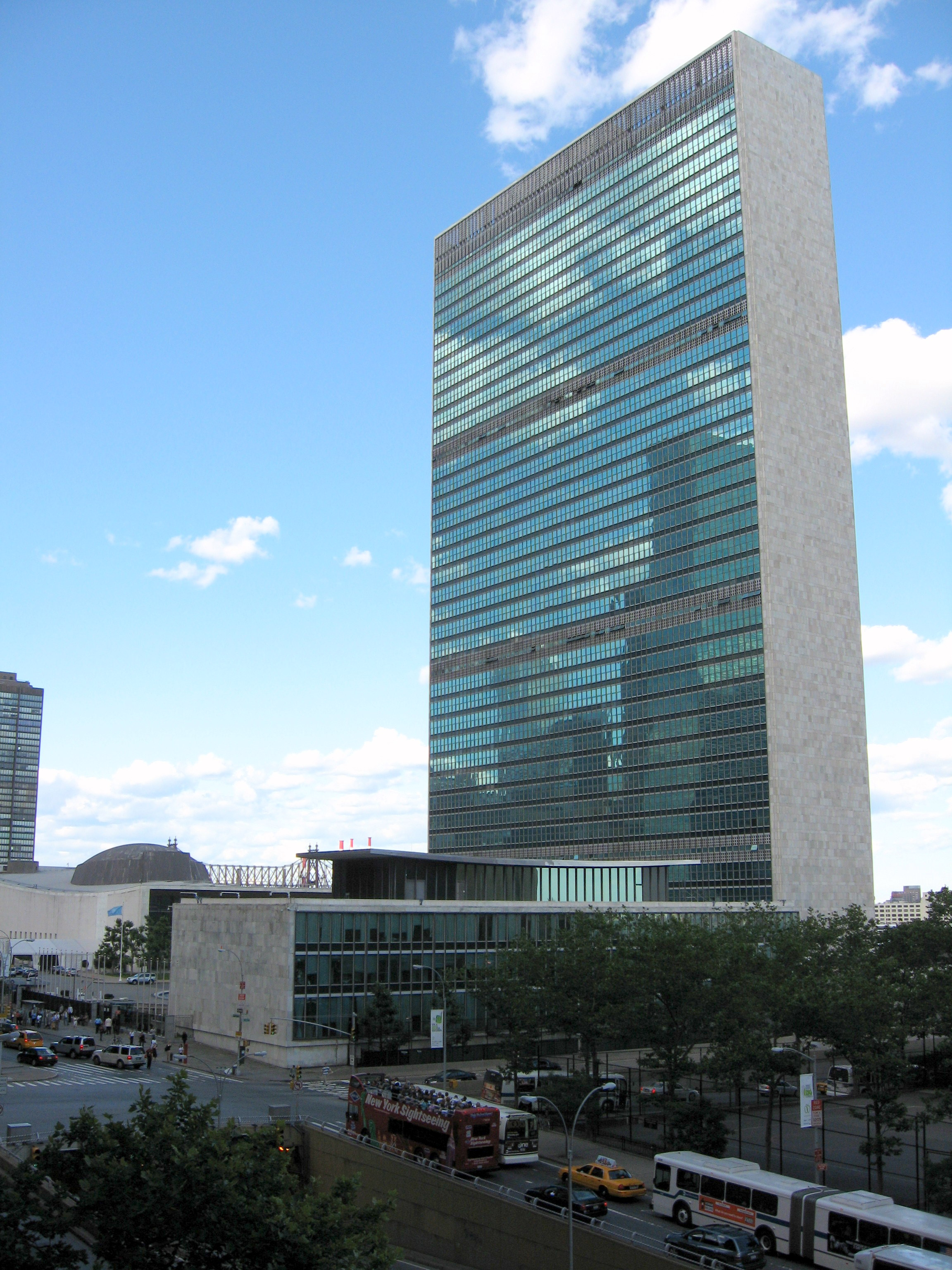
The headquarters of the United Nations in Midtown Manhattan, New York City

Headquarters (often referred to as HQ) notes the location where most or all of the important functions of an organization are coordinated. The term is used in a wide variety of situations, including private sector corporations, non-profits, military organizations, religious groups, sports leagues and so on. It usually implies a geographically dispersed organization with a clear hierarchical structure.

== Corporate ==
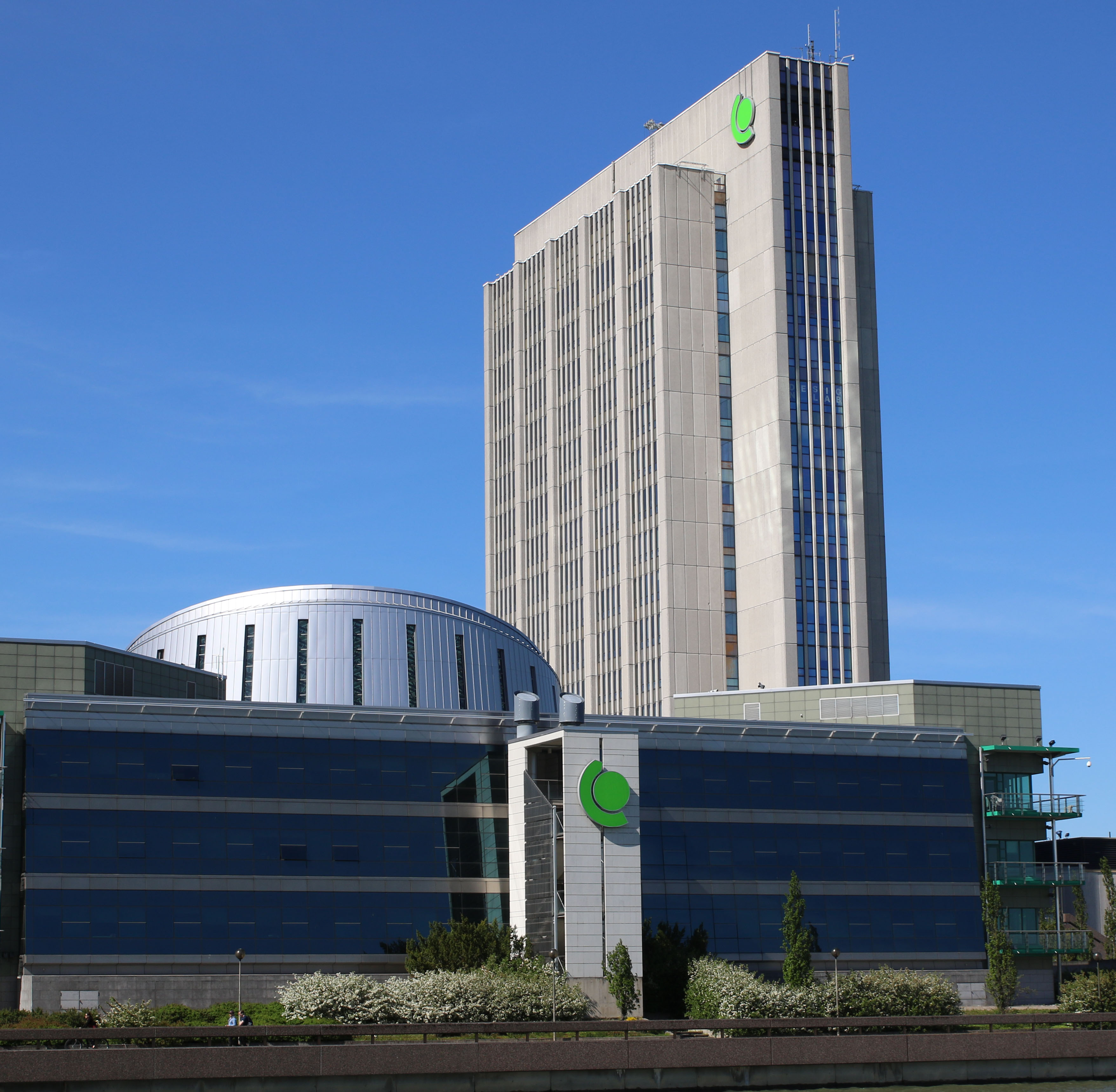
Fortum headquarters building, Espoo, Finland

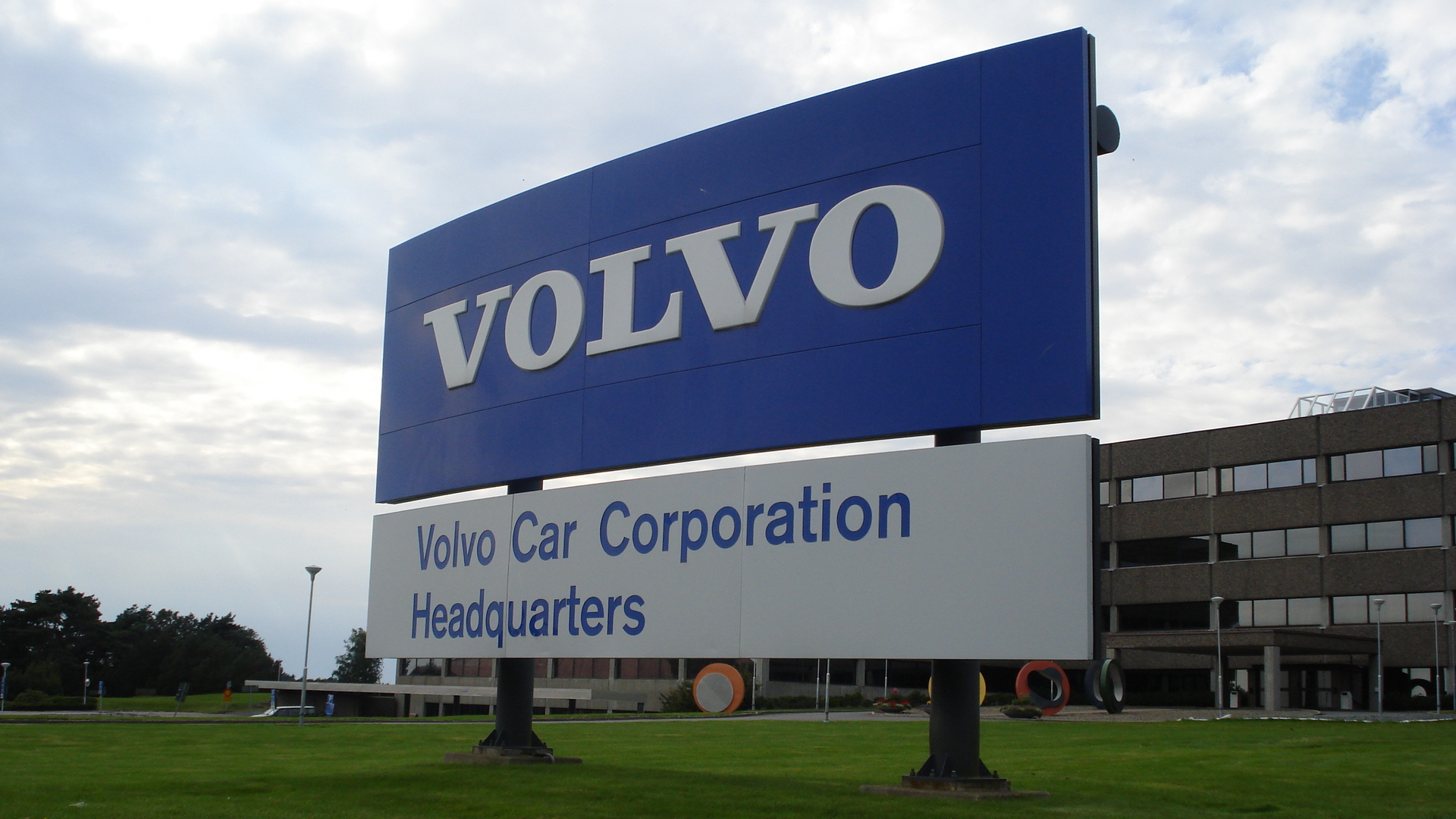
Volvo headquarters building, Gothenburg, Sweden

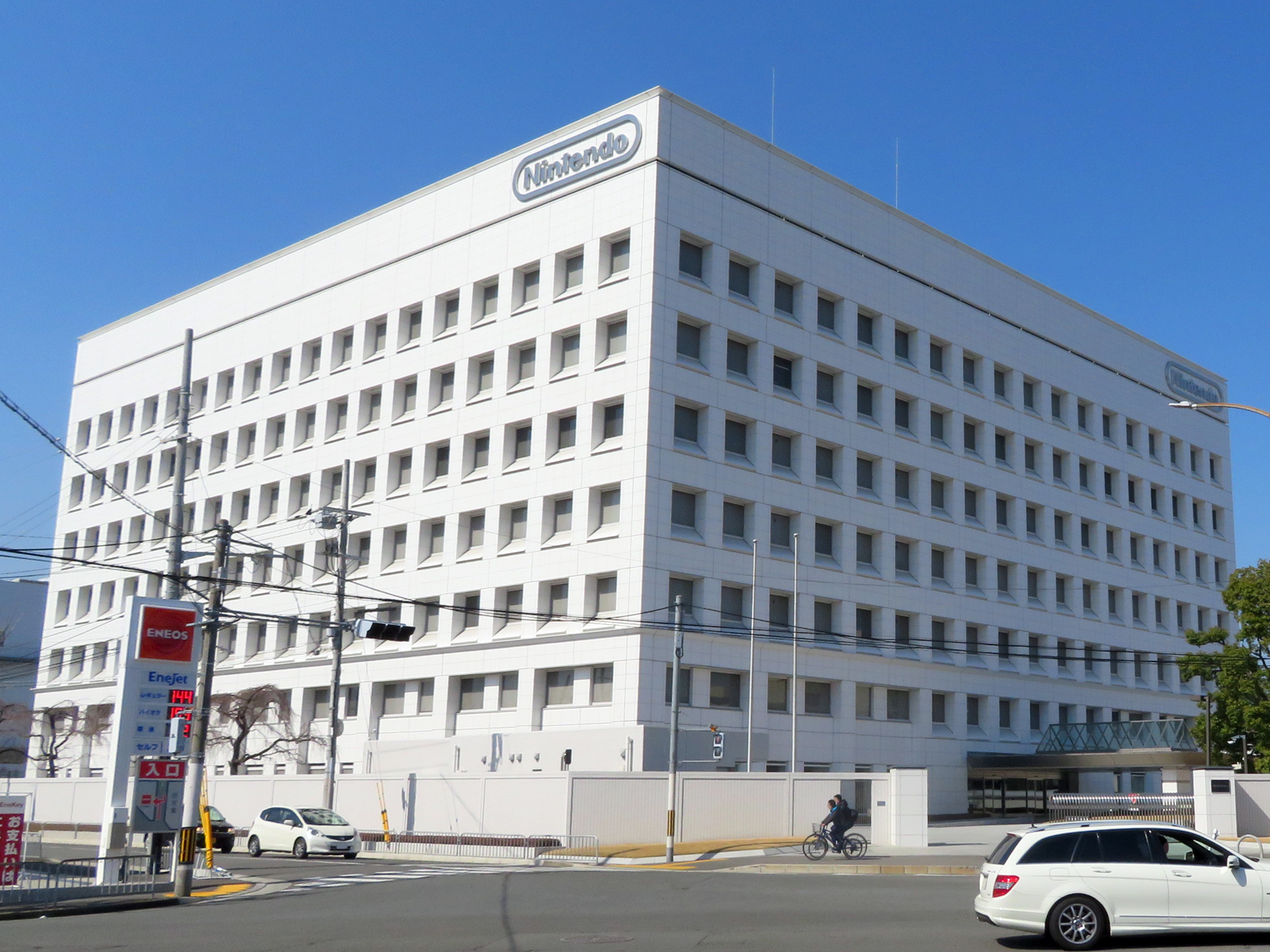
Nintendo headquarters building, Kyoto, Japan

In the private sector, the corporate headquarters is the entity at the top of a corporation that takes responsibility for managing all business activities. The intended benefit of headquarters is to carry out purposeful regulatory capacity and ensure corporate governance. (Note: In this context, the term regulatory capacity includes but is not limited to self-regulating activities.) The corporate headquarters is a key element of a corporate structure and covers different corporate functions including strategic planning, corporate communications, tax payments, legal operations, marketing, finance, human resources, information technology, and procurement. This entity includes the chief executive officer (CEO) as a key person and their support staff such as the CEO office and other CEO-related functions; the "corporate policy making" functions, including all corporate functions necessary to steer the firm by defining and establishing corporate policies; the corporate services encompassing activities that combine or consolidate certain enterprise-wide needed support services, provided based upon specialized knowledge, best practices, and technology to serve internal (and sometimes external) customers and business partners; and the bidirectional interface between corporate headquarters and business units.

=== Business unit ===
A headquarters normally includes the leader of a business unit and their staff, as well as all functions to manage the business unit and operational activities. The head of the business unit is responsible for overall result of the business unit.

=== Regional ===
A headquarters sometimes functions at the top of a regional unit, including all activities of the various business units, taking full responsibility for overall profitability and success of this regional unit.

== Military ==
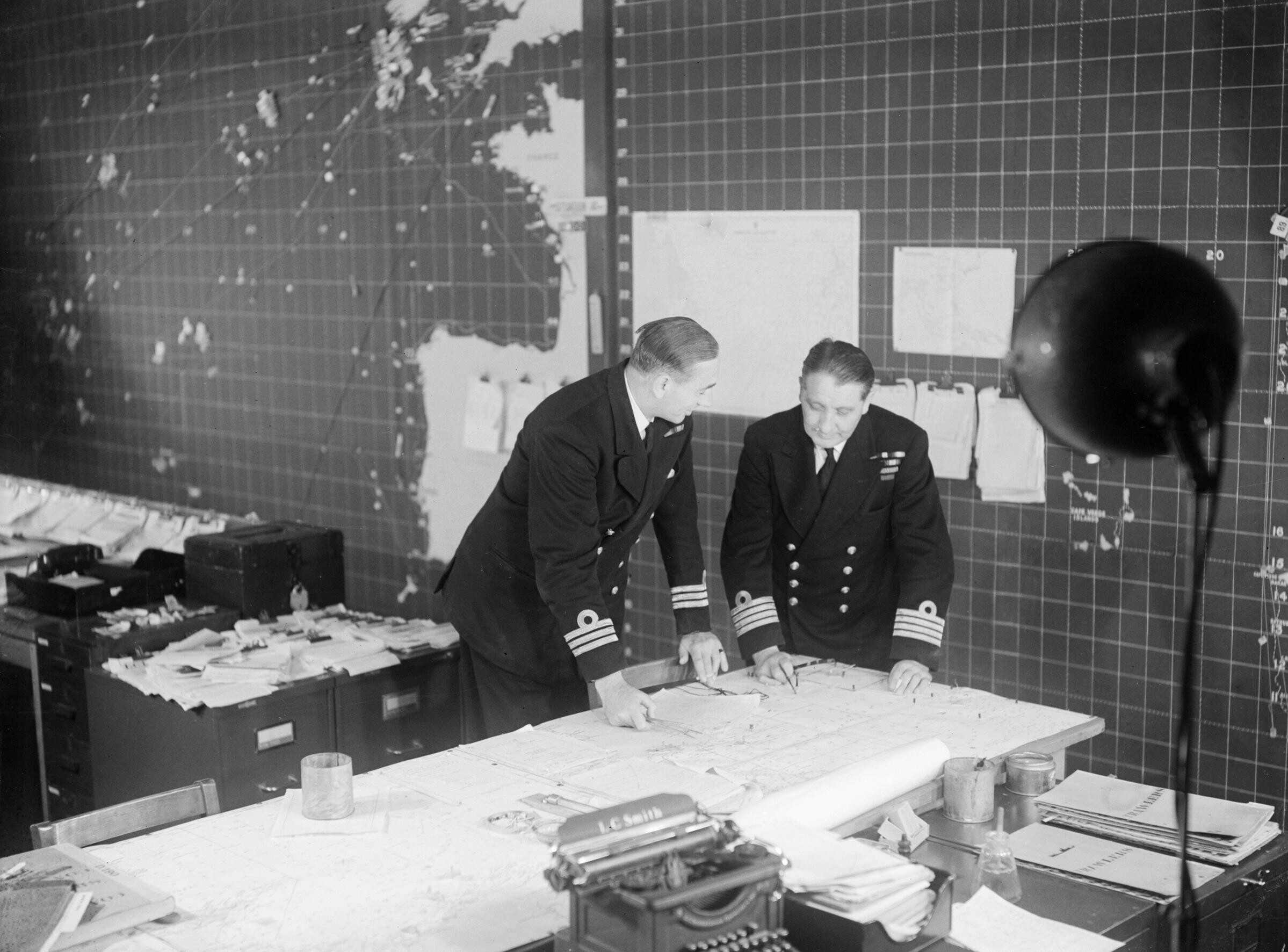
Staff officers discuss convoy movements in the Operations Room at the Western Approaches Command headquarters, Derby House, in Liverpool, England, during World War II, in September 1944.

Military headquarters take many forms, depending on the size and nature of the unit or formation they command. Typically, they are split into the forward, main and rear components, both within NATO nations, and those following the organization and doctrine of the former Soviet Union (see Isby, 1988).

The forward or tactical headquarters, known as "tac" for short, is a small group of staff and communicators. Usually very mobile, they exist to allow the commander to go forward in an operation, and command the key parts of it from a position where they can see the ground and influence their immediate subordinates.

The main HQs (known as 'main') is less mobile and is involved in both the planning and execution of operations. There are a number of staff assembled here from various staff branches to advise the commander, and to control the various aspects of planning and the conduct of discrete operations. A main HQ for a large formation will have a chief of staff (CoS) who coordinates the staff effort; in a smaller HQ this may be done by the second-in-command.

The rear or logistic headquarters is some distance from the battle or front line in conventional operations. Its function is to ensure the logistical support to front line troops, which it does by organizing the delivery of combat supplies, materiel and equipment to where they are needed, and by organizing services such as combat medicine, equipment recovery, and repair.

== Religious ==
Many religions have a hierarchal structure, with a central headquarters.

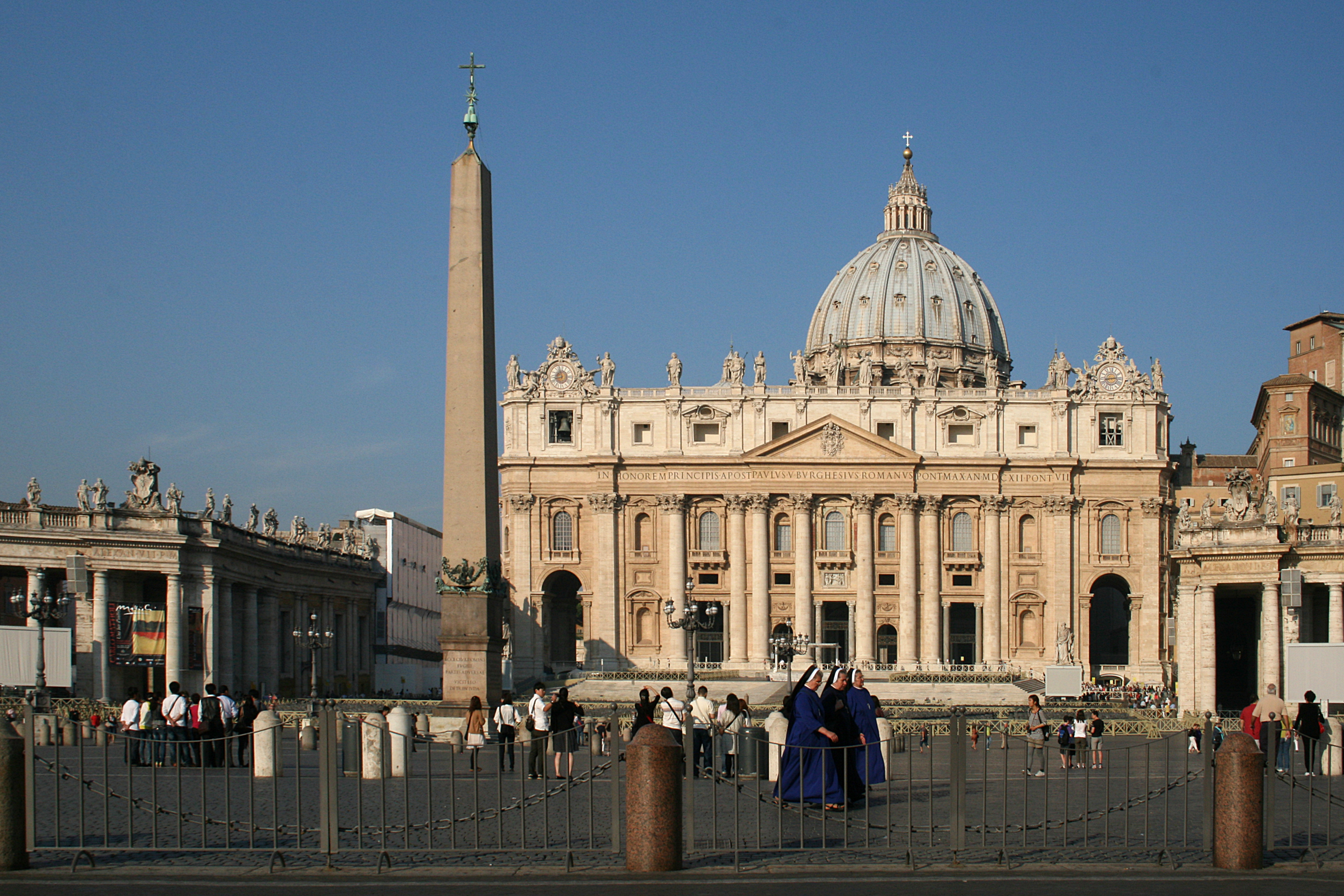
St. Peter's Square with the Vatican obelisk and St. Peter's Basilica, Vatican City

The headquarters of the Catholic Church is Vatican City. The World Headquarters of Jehovah's Witnesses is relocated in Warwick, New York, from its former location, Brooklyn, New York. The headquarters of the Russian Orthodox Church is in Danilov Monastery, Moscow. The World Council of Churches, including Orthodox Churches, has its headquarters in Geneva, Switzerland. The headquarters of Ecumenical Patriarch of Constantinople is located in Istanbul, Turkey. The headquarters of the Church of Jesus Christ of Latter-day Saints is located in Salt Lake City, Utah. The Anglican Communion Office is in London.

== Sports ==
Professional and some amateur sports teams typically compete in leagues, with a central body setting game rules and coordinating schedules. For example, FIFA, the Fédération Internationale de Football Association is the international self-regulatory governing body of association football. Headquartered in Zurich, Switzerland, its membership now comprises 211 national associations, each of which typically has its own headquarters.

=== Martial arts ===
In Japanese martial arts such as karate, judo, aikido, and kendo, each organization or region typically has a headquarters. The Japanese word honbu (本部) is generally used, both in Japan and other countries. Honbu are sometimes referred to as honbu dōjō (本部道場). Honbu can also be written as hombu, the way it is pronounced, but the Hepburn transcription is "honbu" in which the 'n' is a syllabic n.
