= Jiří Dvořák (neurologist) =

Swiss-Czech neurologist

Professor Jiří Dvořák
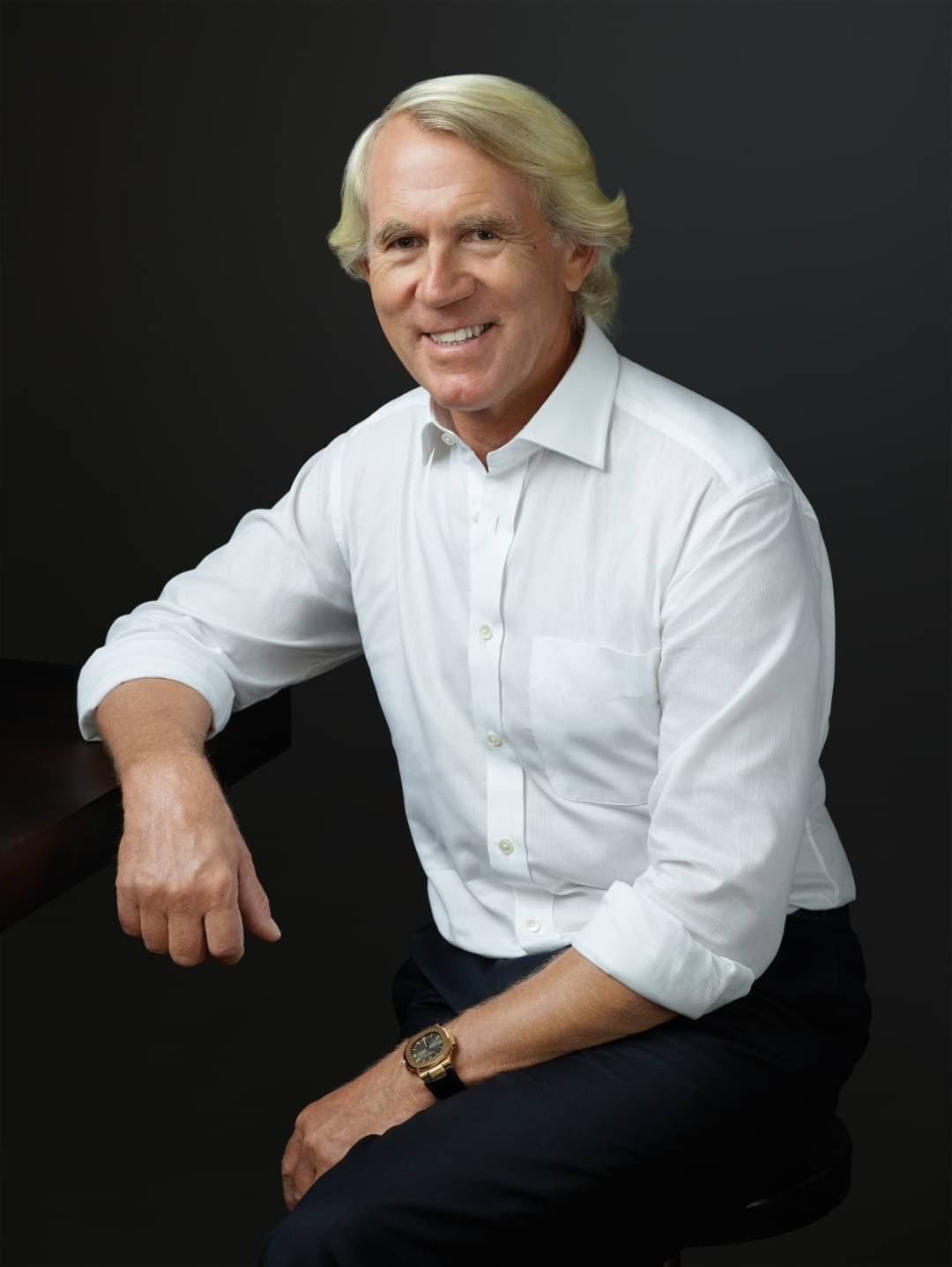
- Dvořák in 2020
- Born: 22 November 1948 (age 77); Hulín, Czechoslovakia
- Citizenship: Switzerland, Czech Republic
- Education: Medicine
- Alma mater: Charles University, University of Zurich
- Known for: Football injury, concussion, and NCD prevention, scientific wellness
- Spouse: Babette Dvořák-Kisling
- Awards: ISSLS Wiltse Lifetime Achievement Award
- Scientific career
- Workplaces: Schulthess Klinik, University of Zurich, Yale School of Medicine, BDMS Wellness Clinic Bangkok
- Website: www.dvorakmedical.com

Jiří Dvořák (born 22 November 1948) is a Swiss-Czech neurologist. He served as a titular professor of neurology at the University of Zurich specializing in spinal disorders. For 23 years he served as Chief Medical Officer at FIFA. In his medical practice and research focuses on preventive care for spinal disorders, sports injuries, and related symptoms.

== Early life and education ==
Dvořák was born 22 November 1948 in Hulín in Czechoslovakia (now the Czech Republic). He began his pre-clinical medical studies at Charles University in Prague in 1966. Due to the Soviet invasion in 1968, he left Czechoslovakia as a refugee and continued his education in Switzerland. He completed his medical degree at the Medical Faculty of the University of Zurich in 1974. In 1986, he completed his postgraduate education in Physical Medicine, Rehabilitation, Manual Medicine, and a residency in Neurology at the University of Bern. Following his residency, he undertook a year-long visiting fellowship in the Department of Biomechanics, Section of Orthopedic Surgery at Yale University School of Medicine. They collaborated over the following 20 years mainly on clinical biomechanics of spine.

== Academic career ==
Dvořák was appointed Professor of Neurology and Spinal Disorders at the University of Zurich in 1995. His main clinical affiliation was with the Schulthess Clinic in Zurich. In 1987, he was appointed as the Chair of the Department of Neurology Spine Unit. He served as Chair until 2008, after which he became the Senior Consultant of the department until 2021. Since 2018, he has served as a Consultant to the Board of the Schulthess Clinic. As of November 2025, Dvořák's research has been cited over 80'000 times and his H-index is 143.

=== Academic journal roles ===
In 1993, Dvořák became deputy editor-in-chief of the journal Spine, and in 2005, a senior editor of the British Journal of Sports Medicine (BJSM). He is one of the founders of the European Spine Society, the largest society focusing on spine-related diseases in the world. He is also an editor at Brain and Spine, a journal of EuroSpine.

== FIFA and sports medicine ==
From 1994 to 2016, Dvořák served as the Chief Medical Officer of FIFA. He was involved in the creation of many preventive programs such as FIFA's 11+ program, which reduced the incidence of injuries in footballers by up to a half.

Dvořák's work shaped some of football's medical and anti-doping policies. He was involved in the management of Diego Maradona's positive doping case at the 1994 FIFA World Cup in the United States, and subsequently developed a system to combat doping and medication abuse in football and sports generally. Dvořák also addressed the issue of cheating with age declarations in youth competitions. By utilizing magnetic resonance imaging (MRI) of the wrist, age determination became a routine procedure to ensure an even playing field at the U-17 level.

=== FIFA Medical Assessment and Research Center (F-MARC) ===
In 1994, together with Sepp Blatter, Dvořák founded the Medical Assessment and Research Centre at FIFA, also called F-MARC, which he chaired until 2016. It was an academic institution and virtual global network of clinicians and researchers. F-MARC focused on mitigating health risks for players.

- High Altitude: Allowing sufficient time for acclimatization when playing competitive games.
- Hot Environments: Establishing mandatory cooling breaks during matches when excessive temperature posed a potential harm, first implemented at the 2008 Beijing Olympics final.
- Ramadan and Football: Research provided the first data on the metabolic state of footballers training and playing during Ramadan, enabling appropriate preparation.
- Sudden Cardiac Death: Following the sudden cardiac death (SCD) of Marc-Vivien Foé during the 2003 FIFA Confederations Cup in Lyon, France, F-MARC developed and made mandatory a screening process for all footballers participating in FIFA competitions, first conducted before the 2006 FIFA World Cup in Germany. They also developed prevention and first-responder strategies. Working with medical emergency specialist Efraim Kramer, they created the FIFA medical emergency bag, setting a global standard, and promoted the "11 Steps to prevent SCD".
- Concussion in Sport Group (CISG): In 2001, medical experts from the IIHF (M. Aubry, W. Meuwise), IOC (P. Schamasch), and F-MARC (J. Dvořák) established the Concussion in Sport Group (CISG). CISG investigates the long-term effects of repeated head trauma and concussion in sports, aiming for prevention through rule changes and physical/mental monitoring. The six subsequent consensus statements of CISG provide the leading guidelines for the diagnosis and management of concussion in sports.
- Football for Health / 11 for Health program: Before the 2010 FIFA World Cup in South Africa, they developed the Football for Health Program to combat Communicable and Non-communicable Diseases (NCDs). This program, later distributed in 52 countries, used 11 simple messages presented by iconic footballers (such as Lionel Messi, Cristiano Ronaldo, and Didier Drogba). The initiative, supported by then-FIFA President Joseph Sepp Blatter and the late Nelson Mandela, proved scientifically effective in improving schoolchildren's health knowledge. During the Ebola outbreak in West Africa, the program was adapted and promoted jointly with the World Bank as "The 11 against Ebola".

F-MARC's contributions to health and beyond were described by Karim Khan et al. as having "demonstrated exceptional commitment to health and social change".

=== Post-FIFA roles ===
Since 2018, Dvořák has been a Consultant and Co-Founder of the Bangkok Wellness Clinic in Bangkok, Thailand. Focusing on the promotion of a healthy lifestyle, he co-authored the 2022 health guide book Health Brings Wealth.

== Personal life ==
Dvořák is married to Babette Dvořák-Kisling, with whom he has four children.

== Awards ==
- In 1990, Dvořák was awarded the Venia legendi from the University of Zurich for his work on the Upper Cervical Spine, specializing in Neurology.
- In 2025, Dvořák was awarded the International Society for Study of the Lumbar Spine ISSLS Wiltse Lifetime Achievement Award.

== Selected works ==
- Dvorak, J; Grob, D; Baumgartner, H; Gschwend, N; Grauer, W; Larsson, S (October 1989). "Functional Evaluation of the Spinal Cord by Magnetic Resonance Imaging in Patients with Rheumatoid Arthritis and Instability of Upper Cervical Spine". Spine. 14 (10): 1057–1064. doi:10.1097/00007632-198910000-00006. PMID 2588053.
- Mannion, Anne F.; Müntener, Markus; Taimela, Simo; Dvorak, Jiri (December 1999). "1999 Volvo Award Winner in Clinical Studies: A Randomized Clinical Trial of Three Active Therapies for Chronic Low Back Pain". Spine. 24 (23): 2435. doi:10.1097/00007632-199912010-00004. PMID 10626305.
- Sutter, Martin; Eggspuehler, Andreas; Jeszenszky, Dezsoe; Kleinstueck, Frank; Fekete, Tamàs F.; Haschtmann, Daniel; Porchet, François; Dvorak, Jiri (March 2019). "The impact and value of uni- and multimodal intraoperative neurophysiological monitoring (IONM) on neurological complications during spine surgery: a prospective study of 2728 patients". European Spine Journal. 28 (3): 599–610. doi:10.1007/s00586-018-5861-0. hdl:2437/264846. PMID 30560453.
- Dvorak, Jiri; Junge, Astrid; Chomiak, Jiri; Graf-Baumann, Toni; Peterson, Lars; Rosch, Dieter; Hodgson, Roy (September 2000). "Risk Factor Analysis for Injuries in Football Players". The American Journal of Sports Medicine. 28 (5_suppl): 69–74. doi:10.1177/28.suppl_5.s-69. PMID 11032110.
- Bizzini, Mario; Junge, Astrid; Dvorak, Jiri (August 2013). "Implementation of the FIFA 11+ football warm up program: How to approach and convince the Football associations to invest in prevention". British Journal of Sports Medicine. 47 (12): 803–806. doi:10.1136/bjsports-2012-092124. PMC 3717809. PMID 23813485.
- Dvorak, Jiri; George, John; Junge, Astrid; Hodler, Juerg (August 2007). "Application of MRI of the wrist for age determination in international U-17 soccer competitions". British Journal of Sports Medicine. 41 (8): 497–500. doi:10.1136/bjsm.2006.033431. PMC 2465442. PMID 17347314.
- Dvorak, Jiri; Kramer, Efraim B; Schmied, Christian M; Drezner, Jonathan A; Zideman, David; Patricios, Jon; Correia, Luis; Pedrinelli, André; Mandelbaum, Bert (December 2013). "The FIFA medical emergency bag and FIFA 11 steps to prevent sudden cardiac death: setting a global standard and promoting consistent football field emergency care". British Journal of Sports Medicine. 47 (18): 1199–1202. doi:10.1136/bjsports-2013-092767. PMID 23940271.
- Dvorak, Jiri; Junge, Astrid (May 2015). "Twenty years of the FIFA Medical Assessment and Research Centre: from 'Medicine for Football' to 'Football for Health'". British Journal of Sports Medicine. 49 (9): 561–563. doi:10.1136/bjsports-2015-094805. PMC 4413737. PMID 25878070.
- Schneider, Kathryn J; Patricios, Jon S (June 2023). "Amsterdam 2022 International Consensus on Concussion in Sport: calling clinicians to action!". British Journal of Sports Medicine. 57 (11): 615–616. doi:10.1136/bjsports-2023-107127.

Together with Babette Dvořák-Kisling, Dvořák edited a book on the Swiss art collector, patron, and art mediator Richard Kisling (1862-1917), who chaired the Kunsthaus Zürich from 1909 to 1917.
