= Cornelis August Wilhelm Hirschman =

Banker, General Secretary of FIFA (1877–1951)

Honorary FIFA Secretary (Acting President of FIFA)
- In office 24 October 1918 – 28 August 1920
- Preceded by: Daniel Burley Woolfall (as President of FIFA)
- Succeeded by: Jules Rimet (as President of FIFA)

2nd General Secretary of FIFA
- In office 1906–1931
- Preceded by: Louis Muhlinghaus
- Succeeded by: Ivo Schricker

Personal details
- Born: 16 February 1877 Medan
- Died: 26 June 1951 (aged 74) Amsterdam
- Occupation: Banker

Cornelis August Wilhelm Hirschman (16 February 1877 – 26 June 1951), known as Carl Anton Wilhelm Hirschman, was a Dutch banker, co-founder of FIFA in 1904 and the 2nd General Secretary of FIFA, serving from 1906 to 1931. In 1912 he was also one of the founders of the Dutch Olympic Committee (NOC).

When FIFA president Daniel Burley Woolfall died in 1918, Hirschman kept the organization from falling apart, almost single-handedly and at his own costs, operating from his offices in Amsterdam. He was FIFA's interim president until Jules Rimet was elected its third president in March 1921.

After the crash of 1929 Hirschman's stock trading company went bankrupt and the money he had invested for the NOC and FIFA was mostly lost. Hirschman unexpectedly resigned from both NOC and FIFA in 1931.

== See also ==
- United Passions, a 2014 film starring Fisher Stevens as Hirschman.
