= 2025 FIFA Youth Series =

2025 Football tournament in Switzerland

Tournament details
- Host country: Switzerland
- Dates: 18–22 May 2025
- Teams: 6
- Venue: 1 (in 1 host city)

Final positions
- Champions: Paraguay (1st title)
- Runners-up: New Zealand
- Third place: Switzerland
- Fourth place: Tunisia

Tournament statistics
- Matches played: 9
- Goals scored: 29 (3.22 per match)
- Top scorer(s): (Paraguay) Hector Salinas (Switzerland) Jean Doucoure (2 goals each)

The 2025 FIFA Youth Series was a football tournament organized by FIFA for U-16 men's teams as part of preparations for the 2025 and 2026 FIFA U-17 World Cup, both held in Qatar. All matches were streamed live and free on FIFA+.

This tournament was held on 18–22 May 2025 and was attended by six countries, four of which qualified for the 2025 U-17 World Cup finals.

== Participating teams ==
- Switzerland (UEFA; host)
- Guatemala (CONCACAF)
- Malaysia (AFC)
- New Zealand (OFC)
- Paraguay (CONMEBOL)
- Tunisia (CAF)

== Venue ==
The tournament was hosted in Zurich, Switzerland.

== Standings ==
All matches use the UTC+2 (CEST) time zone.

=== Group A ===
Pos	Team	Pld	W	D	L	GF	GA	GD	Pts	Qualification
1	New Zealand	2	2	0	0	5	3	+2	6	Advance to Final
2	Switzerland (H)	2	0	1	1	3	4	−1	1	Advance to Third place play-off
3	Guatemala	2	0	1	1	2	3	−1	1	Advance to Fifth place play-off

Source: FIFA
(H) Hosts
18 May 2025
16:30

Switzerland	2–3	New Zealand
Ocran 15'; Krasniqi 73' (pen.)	Report	Nunez 3'; Dyer 49'; Hamilton 54'

FIFA headquarters, Zurich
Referee: Kaio Santos de Lima (Brazil)
19 May 2025
16:30

Guatemala	1–2	New Zealand
Alvarado 14'	Report	Perez 68'; Trenberth 77'

FIFA headquarters, Zurich
Referee: Daniel Uhrmann (Switzerland)
20 May 2025
16:30

Switzerland	1–1	Guatemala
Doucoure 5'	Report	Jimenez 45+2'

FIFA headquarters, Zurich
Referee: Miroslav Nikolić (Switzerland)

=== Group B ===
Pos	Team	Pld	W	D	L	GF	GA	GD	Pts	Qualification
1	Paraguay	2	2	0	0	5	2	+3	6	Advance to Final
2	Tunisia	2	1	0	1	4	4	0	3	Advance to Third place play-off
3	Malaysia	2	0	0	2	0	3	−3	0	Advance to Fifth place play-off

Source: FIFA
18 May 2025
11:00

Malaysia	0–1	Paraguay
	Report	Rolon 53'

FIFA headquarters, Zurich
Referee: Manuel Pfister (Switzerland)
19 May 2025
11:00

Malaysia	0–2	Tunisia
	Report	Trimech 65'; Mellouli 79'

FIFA headquarters, Zurich
Referee: Luca Talarico (Switzerland)
20 May 2025
11:00

Tunisia	2–4	Paraguay
Thabti 36' (pen.); Aloui 45'	Report	Salinas 4', 23'; Amarilla 39'; Cabrera 90+6'

FIFA headquarters, Zurich
Referee: David Portmann (Switzerland)

== Play-offs ==
=== Fifth place play-off ===
21 May 2025
16:30

Guatemala	0–1	Malaysia
	Report	Iman Irfan 90+1'

FIFA headquarters, Zurich
Referee: Ersin Nesimi (Switzerland)

=== Third place play-off ===
22 May 2025
11:00

Switzerland	5–1	Tunisia
Doucoure 5'; Moore 20'; Strassmann 42'; Tchammegni 73'; Saly 77'	Report	Ben Said 45+2'

FIFA headquarters, Zurich
Referee: Luka Stanković (Switzerland)

=== Final ===
22 May 2025
16:30

New Zealand	0–3	Paraguay
	Report	López 19'; Díaz 78'; Gómez 90+4'

FIFA headquarters, Zurich
Referee: Maximilian Zihlmann (Switzerland)

== Goalscorers ==
There were 29 goals scored in 9 matches, for an average of 3.22 goals per match.

2 goals

- (Paraguay) Hector Salinas
- (Switzerland) Jean Doucoure

1 goal

- (Guatemala) Marcos Alvarado
- (Guatemala) Andoni Jimenez
- (Malaysia) Muhammad Iman Irfan Muhammad Hapis
- (New Zealand) Ethan Dyer
- (New Zealand) Cailean Hamilton
- (New Zealand) Matias Nunez
- (New Zealand) Benjamin Perez
- (New Zealand) Ben Trenberth
- (Paraguay) Kevin Amarilla
- (Paraguay) Mathias Cabrera
- (Paraguay) Elías Díaz
- (Paraguay) Axel Gómez
- (Paraguay) Víctor López
- (Paraguay) Jonathan Rolon
- (Switzerland) Leon Krasniqi
- (Switzerland) Jamie Moore
- (Switzerland) Bright Ocran
- (Switzerland) Laurin Saly
- (Switzerland) Sven Strassmann
- (Switzerland) Kenneth Tchammegni
- (Tunisia) Islem Aloui
- (Tunisia) Taieb Mellouli
- (Tunisia) Youssef Ben Said
- (Tunisia) Moncef Thabti
- (Tunisia) Anas Trimech
