= Hulín =

- Town
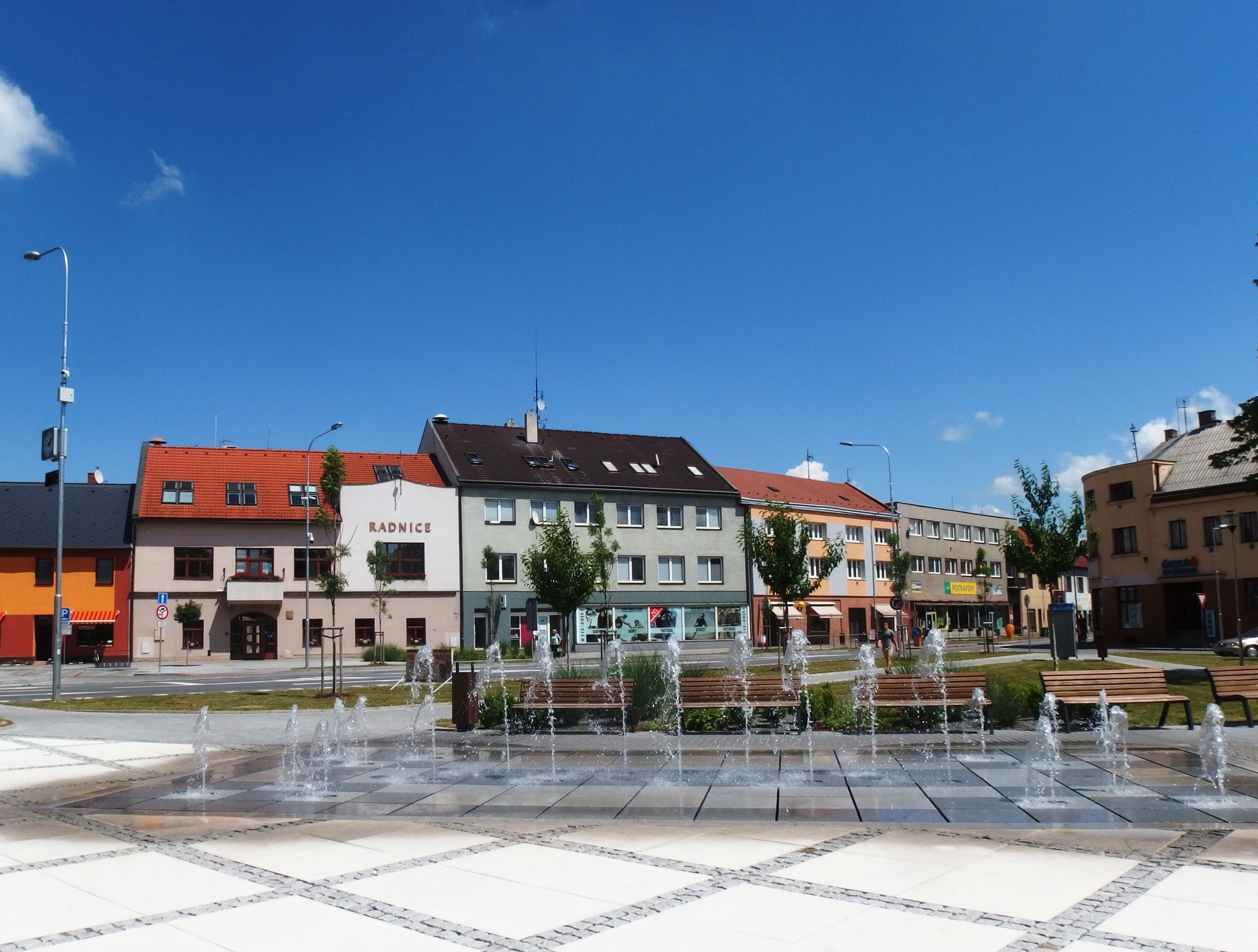
- Town square with the town hall

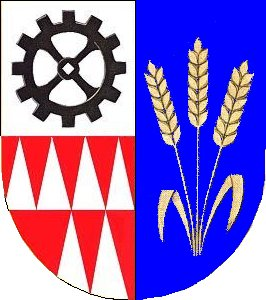
- Flag Coat of arms

- Location in the Czech Republic
- Coordinates: 49°19′0″N 17°27′50″E
- Country: Czech Republic
- Region: Zlín
- District: Kroměříž
- First mentioned: 1224

Government
  - Mayor: Marek Pecha

Area
  - Total: 32.12 km^{2} (12.40 sq mi)
- Elevation: 191 m (627 ft)

Population (2026-01-01)
  - Total: 6,377
  - Density: 198.5/km^{2} (514.2/sq mi)
- Time zone: UTC+1 (CET)
  - Summer (DST): UTC+2 (CEST)
- Postal code: 768 24
- Website: www.hulin.cz

Hulín (Czech pronunciation: [ˈɦuliːn]; German: Hullein) is a town in Kroměříž District in the Zlín Region of the Czech Republic. It has about 6,400 inhabitants. The town is located in the Upper Morava Valley, on the streams Rusava and Mojena.

== Administrative division ==
Hulín consists of three municipal parts (in brackets population according to the 2021 census):

- Hulín (5,901)
- Chrášťany (92)
- Záhlinice (327)

== Geography ==
Hulín is located about 5 kilometres (3 mi) east of Kroměříž and 16 km (10 mi) northwest of Zlín. It lies in a flat landscape in the Upper Morava Valley. The Rusava and Mojena streams flow through the town. The Rusava flows into the Morava River, which forms part of the southern municipal border. There is a system of several fishponds south of the town.

== History ==
The first written mention of Hulín is from 1224, when the visit of King Ottokar I was documented. In 1261, the village was donated to the church by King Ottokar II of Bohemia as acknowledgement to bishop Bruno von Schauenburg for his services. Shortly after, Hulín was promoted to a town. At the end of the 13th century, a local small fortress was rebuilt to a bigger castle and the town centre was fortified with walls and a moat.

The local population subsisted mainly on agriculture. The breeding of cattle was significant. In the 1840s, the railway was built and the town slowly began to industrialise.

== Demographics ==
Historical population

Year	Pop.	±%
1869	2,867	—
1880	3,405	+18.8%
1890	3,663	+7.6%
1900	3,831	+4.6%
1910	4,377	+14.3%

Year	Pop.	±%
1921	4,506	+2.9%
1930	4,931	+9.4%
1950	4,788	−2.9%
1961	6,014	+25.6%
1970	6,354	+5.7%

Year	Pop.	±%
1980	7,649	+20.4%
1991	7,895	+3.2%
2001	7,610	−3.6%
2011	6,896	−9.4%
2021	6,320	−8.4%

Source: Censuses

== Transport ==
The town is surrounded by motorways on two sides. The intersection of the D1 and D55 motorways is located in the northern part of the territory.

Hulín is a railway junction. The town is located on the lines Prague–Luhačovice, Brno–Olomouc and Rožnov pod Radhoštěm–Kojetín.

== Sport ==
SK Spartak Hulín is a football club which played in the Moravian–Silesian Football League (third tier of Czech football system). After relegation in 2019, the club suspended its activities and since the 2020–21 season it plays in lower amateur tiers.

== Sights ==
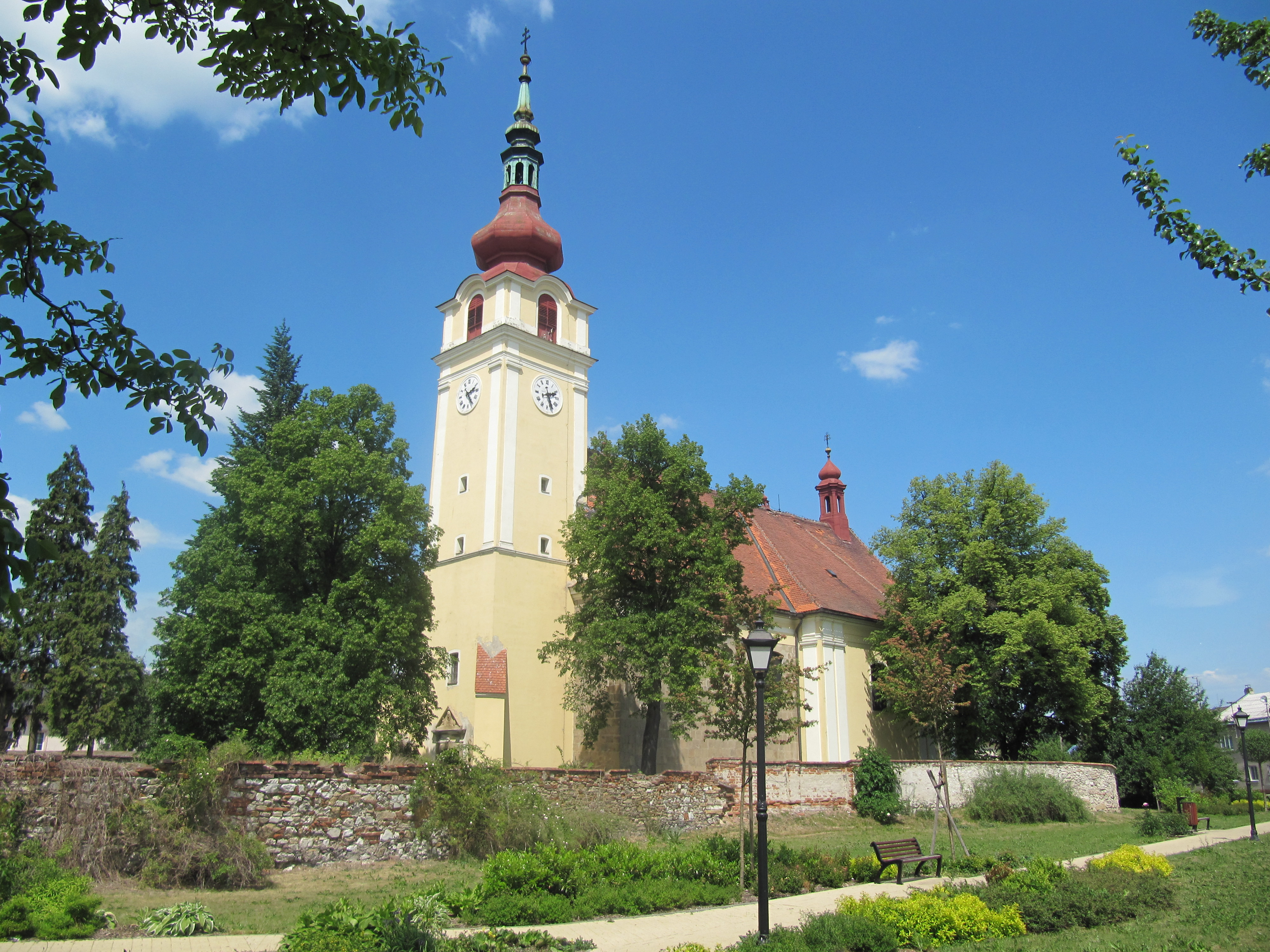
Church of Saint Wenceslaus

The main landmark of Hulín is the Church of Saint Wenceslaus. It was founded in the early 13th century. The originally Romanesque church was rebuilt into its present form after a fire in 1747.

== Notable people ==
- Jiří Dvořák (born 1948), Czech-Swiss neurologist
- Zdeněk Nehoda (born 1952), footballer and football agent
- Radek Drulák (born 1962), footballer
- Zdeněk Zlámal (born 1985), footballer; grew up here

== Twin towns – sister cities ==
Hulín is twinned with:

- Zlaté Moravce, Slovakia
