= Enrique Buero =

Uruguayan diplomat

Enrique Eduardo Buero (10 January 1891 – 1975) was a Uruguayan lawyer, diplomat and football administrator. Along with Jules Rimet, he is considered the founder of the FIFA World Cup and played a central role in Uruguay's successful bid to host the 1930 FIFA World Cup. He was described him as a key intermediary between the Uruguayan Football Association (AUF), the Uruguayan state and FIFA during the creation of the tournament.

== Early life and diplomatic career ==
Buero was born in Montevideo on 10 January 1891, the son of J. Enrique Buero and María Thévenet. He studied law at the University of Montevideo, graduating in 1914, and then entered Uruguay's foreign service. In 1916 he became under-secretary in the Ministry of Foreign Affairs, and in 1918 under-secretary in the Ministry of Finance. From 1920 to 1923 he served as a national deputy.

In 1923 Buero was appointed Uruguayan minister to Switzerland and represented Uruguay at the League of Nations in Geneva. In this position he also became an important overseas contact for the AUF, which sought admission to FIFA in order to consolidate its international position. When the Uruguayan association was too late to send its own delegates to the 1923 FIFA congress in Geneva, Buero attended the meeting and carried out the mission on its behalf. He also signed the Geneva Protocol of 1925 on behalf of Uruguay.

Buero later served as Uruguayan minister to Belgium and the Netherlands from 1927, to Germany from 1932 and to Spain from 1939. He was accredited in Berlin from 17 March 1933 to 12 September 1934. In 1930 he was a member of the Administrative Council of the Permanent Court of International Justice at The Hague. In 1933 he served as secretary general of the Seventh International Conference of American States in Montevideo. In 1935 he served on the board of the National Administration of Ports in Uruguay.

During the Second World War and its aftermath, Buero continued his diplomatic career in Latin America and Europe. He was Uruguayan minister in Madrid until 1942, ambassador in Lima from 1942 to 1946, ambassador in Rio de Janeiro from 1946 to 1948 and ambassador to the Court of St James's from 1948 to 1953. He was also a member of the Turco-Danish Conciliation Tribunal.

Buero married Margarita Álvarez Martínez. Their children included Enrique J. Buero, nicknamed "le Belge", and Margot Buero.

== Football administrator ==
Buero became closely associated with Uruguay's international football diplomacy during the 1920s. He was head of delegation for the Uruguay national football team at the 1924 Olympic football tournament in Paris and the 1928 Olympic football tournament in Amsterdam, both of which Uruguay won. His work included arranging accommodation, visas and training facilities, and promoting the team abroad. The Olympic victories gave Uruguay exceptional prestige in international football and strengthened Buero's position within FIFA.

In 1928 Buero was elected a FIFA vice-president, becoming the first South American member of FIFA's executive board. According to historian Lorenzo Jalabert D’Amado, he was "pivotal" in the process that led from the AUF's affiliation to FIFA in 1923 to Uruguay's selection as host of the first World Cup in 1930. Paul Dietschy has also described Buero, then the Uruguayan ambassador in Brussels, as a tireless advocate of the Uruguayan bid.

The idea of a separate world football championship had been discussed within FIFA during the 1920s, especially after tensions between FIFA and the International Olympic Committee over amateurism. At the FIFA congress in Amsterdam on 26 May 1928, shortly before Uruguay retained its Olympic title, the congress approved the principle of a world championship organized by FIFA. Uruguay then prepared a bid for the first tournament, citing its two Olympic titles and the centenary of its constitution in 1930.

At FIFA's annual congress in Barcelona in May 1929, Uruguay competed against several European bids, including Italy, Hungary, the Netherlands, Spain and Sweden. The Uruguayan campaign was supported by a state-backed financial proposal and by coordinated South American lobbying. The Uruguayan government agreed to provide a 300,000-peso subsidy for the organization of the tournament and a 200,000-peso loan for stadium construction. The Uruguayan delegates also promised to cover travel, accommodation and subsistence costs for participating teams, together with compensation for players during the journey and during their stay in Montevideo.

Uruguay was eventually selected as host after its rivals withdrew or were politically outmanoeuvred during the congress. Jalabert D’Amado has argued that the decision was not the simple unanimous choice later suggested by official FIFA memory, but the result of a complex diplomatic and economic campaign in which Buero and other South American representatives played a decisive role. FIFA later described the decision as controversial and noted that several countries withdrew from the tournament after Uruguay was awarded the competition.

In the months before the 1930 World Cup, European participation remained uncertain. Three months before the start of the tournament no European association had formally agreed to take part. From Brussels, Buero conducted extensive negotiations with FIFA and European national associations. At a meeting in Brussels he presented Uruguay's financial guarantees, including the payment of travel and food costs for delegations, daily allowances for players and a share of tournament revenue for FIFA. Belgium was the first European country to accept the invitation after Buero and Rodolphe Seeldrayers, president of the Belgian football association and a FIFA colleague of Buero, persuaded Belgian football officials to support participation. Belgium was later joined by France, Romania and Yugoslavia.

On 20 June 1930 Buero personally saw off the Belgian delegation at Brussels-South railway station. According to a later account in BRUZZ, his fifteen-year-old son Enrique J. Buero had already travelled with the trophy that would later become known as the Jules Rimet Trophy. Buero published a collection of his correspondence on the organization of the World Cup in 1932 under the title Negociaciones Internacionales: La Organización de la Coupe du Monde, which has become an important source for later historians of the tournament.

== Honours ==
- Grand Cross of the Order of the Crown (Belgium)
- Grand Cross of the Order of Christ (Portugal), 1930
- Grand Officer of the Legion of Honour
- Order of the Crown of Italy
- National Order of the Southern Cross

== Diplomatic posts ==
Post	Term	Predecessor	Successor
Uruguayan minister to Switzerland	1923–1927	—	Ernesto Benavides
Uruguayan minister to Belgium	1927–1931	—	Julio A. Lacarte Muro
Uruguayan minister to Germany	17 March 1933 – 12 September 1934	Pedro Cosio	Virgilio Sampognaro
Uruguayan minister to Spain	1939 – 14 May 1942	Daniel Castellanos	Virgilio Sampognaro
Uruguayan minister to Peru	14 May 1942 – 9 April 1946	Virgilio Sampognaro	Álvaro Vázquez
Uruguayan minister to Brazil	9 April 1946 – 1948	Carlos María Ramírez	Carlos Manini Ríos
Uruguayan ambassador to the United Kingdom	1948–1953	Federico Vidiella	José Antonio Quadras
