= FIFA headquarters =

Distinctive complex in Zürich

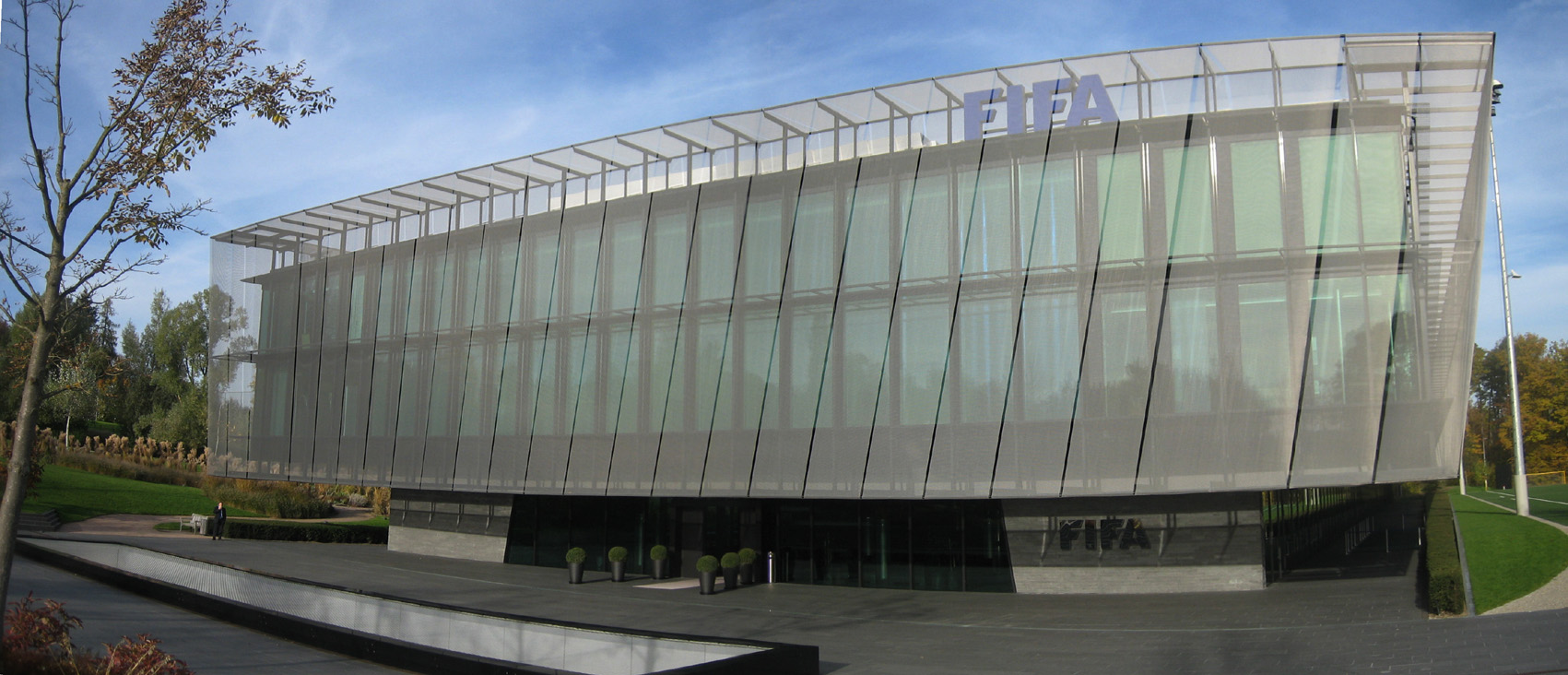
- Interactive map of the FIFA headquarters area

General information
- Location: Zürich, Switzerland, FIFA-Strasse 20
- Coordinates: 47°22′53″N 8°34′28″E
- Construction started: 2004
- Inaugurated: 29 May 2007
- Cost: CHF 240 million
- Owner: International Federation of Association Football

Design and construction
- Architect: Tilla Theus

The headquarters of FIFA (German: FIFA-Hauptquartier) is a distinctive complex in Zürich. The complex has served as the official headquarters of FIFA since its completion in 2006. It is located on the Zürichberg, a wooded hill in District 7.

As well as offices, the complex includes a fitness centre, a meditation room, geographically themed parks, a full-size international football pitch and full-size beach football pitch.

The main building has only two upper levels, but five underground levels, resulting in two thirds of the headquarters lying underground. "Places where people make decisions should only contain indirect light," said Sepp Blatter, "because the light should come from the people themselves who are assembled there."
