= Louis Muhlinghaus =

Belgian football administrator and General Secretary of FIFA

1st General Secretary of FIFA
- In office 1904–1906
- Preceded by: Position created
- Succeeded by: Cornelis August Wilhelm Hirschman

Personal details
- Born: Brussels, Belgium
- Died: Belgium
- Occupation: Football administrator

Louis Muhlinghaus (1870–1915) was a Belgian football administrator and the 1st General Secretary of FIFA, serving from 1904 to 1906. Muhlinghaus got involved in football through his association with the K.F.C. Rhodienne-De Hoek. In 1895, he took the initiative to help found the UBSSA, the precursor of the Royal Belgian Football Association. In 1904, after an international between Belgium and France in Ukkel, he convinced his French counterpart to found an international Football Association. Muhlinghaus became its first secretary and treasurer. He was also the first person, in 1905, to propose the idea of an international competition for national teams. This prototype world cup did not materialize, which partly led to his resignation as secretary-treasurer. He however continued to attend the yearly FIFA-congresses held throughout Europe. According to some sources, he died in 1915.
