= 2028 FIFA Futsal World Cup =

International futsal event

Tournament details
- Dates: 7–29 October
- Teams: 24 (from 6 (Note: European teams may not participate if UEFA's boycott of FIFA competitions over the FIFA Forward Enterprise proposal continues.) confederations)

Tournament statistics
- Matches played: 52
- All statistics correct as of 9 May 2026.

The 2028 FIFA Futsal World Cup will be the eleventh edition of the FIFA Futsal World Cup, the quadrennial international futsal championship contested by the men's national teams of the member associations of FIFA. The tournament will be held from 7 to 29 October.

Brazil are the defending champions by defeating Argentina 2–1 in the previous edition

== Host candidates ==
- France
- Indonesia
- Kuwait
- Malaysia
- Morocco
- Spain

== Qualification ==
Confederation	Qualified through	Team	Appearance	Last appearance	Previous best performance
AFC (Asia) (5 teams)	2028 AFC Futsal Asian Cup				
CAF (Africa) (3 teams)	2028 Futsal Africa Cup of Nations				
CONCACAF (Central, North America and Caribbean) (4 teams)	2028 CONCACAF Futsal Championship				
CONMEBOL (South America) (4 teams)	2028 Copa América de Futsal				
OFC (Oceania) (1 team)	2027 OFC Futsal Nations Cup				
UEFA (Europe) (7 teams)	2028 FIFA Futsal World Cup qualification (UEFA)				

== Sponsorship ==
FIFA Partners

- Adidas
- Coca-Cola
- Aramco
- Qatar Airways
- Hyundai
- Visa

== UEFA boycott ==
On 30 July 2026, following FIFA's announcement of FIFA Forward Enterprise (a proposal to sell stakes in FIFA's tournament operations, including for the FIFA Futsal World Cup, to private investors), all 55 UEFA member associations agreed on an indefinite boycott of FIFA competitions until the proposal was shelved and assurances were made that such a proposal would not be tabulated again. A day later on 31 July, the proposal was scrapped, although UEFA stated that, regardless, it no longer trusts FIFA's governance. Following written assurances that a similar proposal wouldn't be brought up, UEFA provisionally suspended its boycott for the 2026–27 season on 27 August, although the boycott currently remains for tournaments beyond that season.

== See also ==
- 2029 FIFA Futsal Women's World Cup
