= FIFA Medical Assessment and Research Centre =

Research centre dedicated to health and injury prevention in football

- Abbreviation: F-MARC
- Formation: 1994
- Founder: Jiří Dvořák; Sepp Blatter
- Founded at: Switzerland
- Dissolved: 2017
- Type: Independent research institution
- Headquarters: Zurich, Switzerland
- Origins: 1994 FIFA World Cup
- Region served: Global (209 FIFA Member Associations)
- Products: Sports injury surveillance system, injury prevention programmes (the 11, FIFA 11+), football for health, pre-competition medical assessment, FIFA medical emergency bag (FMEB), consensus statements on various topics
- Services: Injury surveillance, injury prevention, pre-competition medical assessment (PCMA), athlete biological passport monitoring
- Methods: Epidemiological studies, randomized controlled trials, biological monitoring, global registry of cardiac events, consensus meetings
- Fields: Football and sport medicine, scientific research, anti-doping
- Chairman: Jiří Dvořák, Prof., MD
- Head of Research: Astrid Junge, Prof., PhD
- Project leader: Colin Fuller, PhD (Risk Management and Football for Health); Mario Bizzini, PhD (FIFA 11+)
- Key people: Lars Peterson, Prof. Dr Raúl Madero, Dr; Yacine Zerguini, Dr; Jiří Chomiak, Prof. Dr; Tony Edwards, Dr; Bert Mandelbaum, Dr; Abdelrahman Ahmed Hosny, Prof. Dr; Donald T Kirkendall, Dr; Mario Bizzini, Dr; Efraim B Kramer, Prof. Dr; Christian M Schmied, Prof. Dr; Nina Feddermann-Demont, PhD; Pieter D’Hooghe, Dr Gurharan Singh, Dr
- Parent organization: Fédération Internationale de Football Association (FIFA)
- Subsidiaries: FIFA Medical Centres of Excellence
- Remarks: Existed for 23 years, transitioning from "Medicine for Football" to "Football for Health".

FIFA Medical Assessment and Research Centre (F-MARC) was an independent research unit established in 1994 by the Fédération Internationale de Football Association (FIFA). The centre's primary objectives were to develop a scientific basis to protect the health of all players, reduce football injuries at all levels, and promote football as a health-enhancing leisure activity. The initiative was introduced by former FIFA President Sepp Blatter, and led by Chairman Prof. Jiří Dvořák and Head of Research Prof. Astrid Junge. Over its 23-year existence, F-MARC's focus transitioned from "Medicine for Football"—which focused on injury prevention and treatment—to "Football for Health", an initiative utilizing the sport to improve global public health.

== History and mission ==
F-MARC was founded during the 1994 FIFA World Cup in Switzerland in response to questions about how medicine and science could improve the game of football. During its initial years, F-MARC focused on establishing continuous injury surveillance systems, as epidemiological data on football injuries was scarce at the time. To ensure international consistency, F-MARC led consensus meetings to establish standardized definitions for injury, severity, and exposure in football that were subsequently adopted by other international sporting federations. The organization's mission eventually expanded to include all FIFA Member Associations, producing over 300 peer-reviewed original research studies to establish a data-driven foundation for football medicine.

== Epidemiology and injury surveillance ==
F-MARC implemented a standardized injury surveillance system first utilized at the 1998 FIFA World Cup in France, which was routinely applied at subsequent FIFA tournaments. Research data indicated a decrease in the incidence of injuries at FIFA World Cups and the football tournaments of the Olympic Games for male players between 1998 and 2012. F-MARC expanded its injury surveillance methodologies beyond men's senior football to include female players, youth tournaments, futsal, and supported other international sports to implement a similar procedure at multi-sport events such as the Olympic Games, the IAAF World Athletics Championships, and the FINA World Championships in Aquatics.

== Injury prevention programmes ==
F-MARC translated its epidemiological findings into preventive measures by developing "The 11", an exercise programme designed for amateur players, which later evolved into the comprehensive "FIFA 11+" warm-up programme. Numerous randomized controlled trials and clinical guidelines have demonstrated that the FIFA 11+ programme reduces football injuries by up to 50% when practiced regularly. A 2025 systematic review and meta-analysis also found that the FIFA 11+ programme significantly reduced the rate of ankle injuries by 33%.

The programme expanded into targeted variations. The "FIFA 11+ for Referees" was created by Mario Bizzini to mitigate acute non-contact injuries for match officials. The "FIFA 11+ Kids" was adapted for children under the age of 13. Studies show the pediatric programme not only prevents lower-limb injuries but also improves dynamic movement patterns, fundamental motor skills, spatial orientation, and selective attention in elementary school children.

== Prevention of sudden cardiac death ==
Following the sudden cardiac death of player Marc-Vivien Foé during the 2003 FIFA Confederations Cup, F-MARC intensified its focus on the prevention of sudden cardiac arrest in football, and developed a Pre-Competition Medical Assessment (PCMA) for FIFA competitions, which included electrocardiograms (ECG) and echocardiography to screen for underlying cardiovascular diseases.

To standardize on-field emergency responses, FIFA developed the FIFA Medical Emergency Bag (FMEB) equipped with an automated external defibrillator (AED) and distributed it to all 209 Member Associations. F-MARC established the "FIFA 11 steps to prevent sudden cardiac death", a standardized action plan for recognizing and managing sudden cardiac arrest, and collaborated to establish the FIFA Sudden Death Registry to document fatal and successfully resuscitated cases globally.

== Football for Health initiatives ==
Expanding into public health, F-MARC created "FIFA 11 for Health", a football-based health education programme for children utilizing 11 messages to address communicable diseases (e.g., HIV, malaria) and non-communicable diseases (e.g., obesity, hypertension). The programme saw global implementation across schools and communities in regions such as South Africa, Zimbabwe, Mauritius, Mexico, and Brazil. During the 2014 Ebola epidemic, the "11 against Ebola" campaign was launched with the support of the World Bank and prominent professional players to educate West African populations on hygiene and disease prevention.

F-MARC research additionally demonstrated that regular recreational football training structured as small-sided games serves as an effective broad-spectrum treatment for non-communicable diseases. Studies showed it reduces blood pressure, improves cardiac function, and increases muscle mass in diverse populations, including the elderly, untrained individuals, and patients with type 2 diabetes or prostate cancer.

== Research and sporting integrity ==
=== Anti-doping strategy ===
F-MARC's anti-doping approach combined strict testing with education and biological monitoring. FIFA introduced the Athlete Biological Passport at the 2014 FIFA World Cup, and F-MARC conducted longitudinal pharmacological research into the excretion of testosterone, nandrolone, and clenbuterol to differentiate natural physiological variations from doping abuse, thereby preventing false-positive tests.

=== Age determination ===
To combat age falsification in U-17 youth competitions, F-MARC pioneered a radiation-free method using Magnetic Resonance Imaging (MRI) of the wrist to determine skeletal bone maturity.

=== Environmental considerations ===
F-MARC published consensus statements regarding playing football in extreme environments. This research formulated guidelines for playing at high altitudes and extreme heat. Based on its research into heat stress, FIFA introduced mandatory cooling breaks at the 30-minute mark of halves when the Wet Bulb Globe Temperature (WBGT) exceeds 31 °C or 32 °C. Additional studies resulted in evidence-based guidelines for Muslim athletes observing the fast of Ramadan.

== Improving standards of care ==
To ensure the highest standards of medical care and clinical management, F-MARC established the "FIFA Medical Centres of Excellence" network. This ongoing programme has accredited dozens of elite clinics and hospitals globally, serving as educational hubs for football medicine and rehabilitation.

F-MARC actively contributed to global consensus standards on injury management, notably participating in the International Conferences on Concussion in Sport. The organization played a pivotal role in creating the Sport Concussion Assessment Tool (SCAT3, later evolving to SCAT5) and researching video signs of concussion to systemize sideline head injury evaluations. F-MARC also produced widely distributed educational resources, including the Football Medicine Manual, the Emergency Medicine Manual, and the First Aid Manual.

== See also ==
- FIFA
- Sports medicine
- Sudden cardiac death of athletes
- World Anti-Doping Agency
