= Robert Guérin =

1st President of FIFA

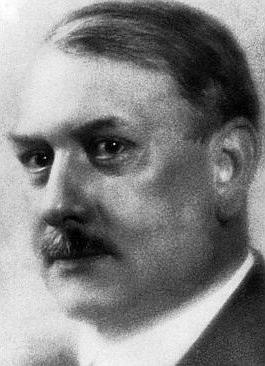
- Guérin in 1906

1st President of FIFA
- In office 23 May 1904 – 4 June 1906
- Preceded by: Position established
- Succeeded by: Daniel Burley Woolfall

Personal details
- Born: Clément Auguste Maurice Robert; 28 April 1876 Reims, France
- Died: 19 March 1952 (aged 75) Montmartre, Paris, France
- Spouse(s): Edith Harris (m. 1907; died 1926) Andrée Brunel (m. 1927)
- Occupation: Manager; Football administrator

Robert Guérin (French pronunciation: [ʁɔbɛʁ ɡeʁɛ̃]; born Clément Auguste Maurice Robert; 28 April 1876 – 19 March 1952) was a French journalist who was one of the founders of the Fédération Internationale de Football Association (FIFA) and served as its first president. A journalist with Le Matin newspaper, Guérin was actively involved in football through his role as secretary of the Football Department of the Union of French Athletic Sports Societies. He brought together representatives of the first seven member countries in Paris for the signing of FIFA's foundation act and agreement of the first FIFA statutes. On 24 May 1904, 28-year-old Guérin was elected president at the inaugural FIFA Congress and remained in his post for two years, during which time another eight associations came on board, including the Football Association.
