= Daniel Burley Woolfall =

President of FIFA from 1906 to 1918

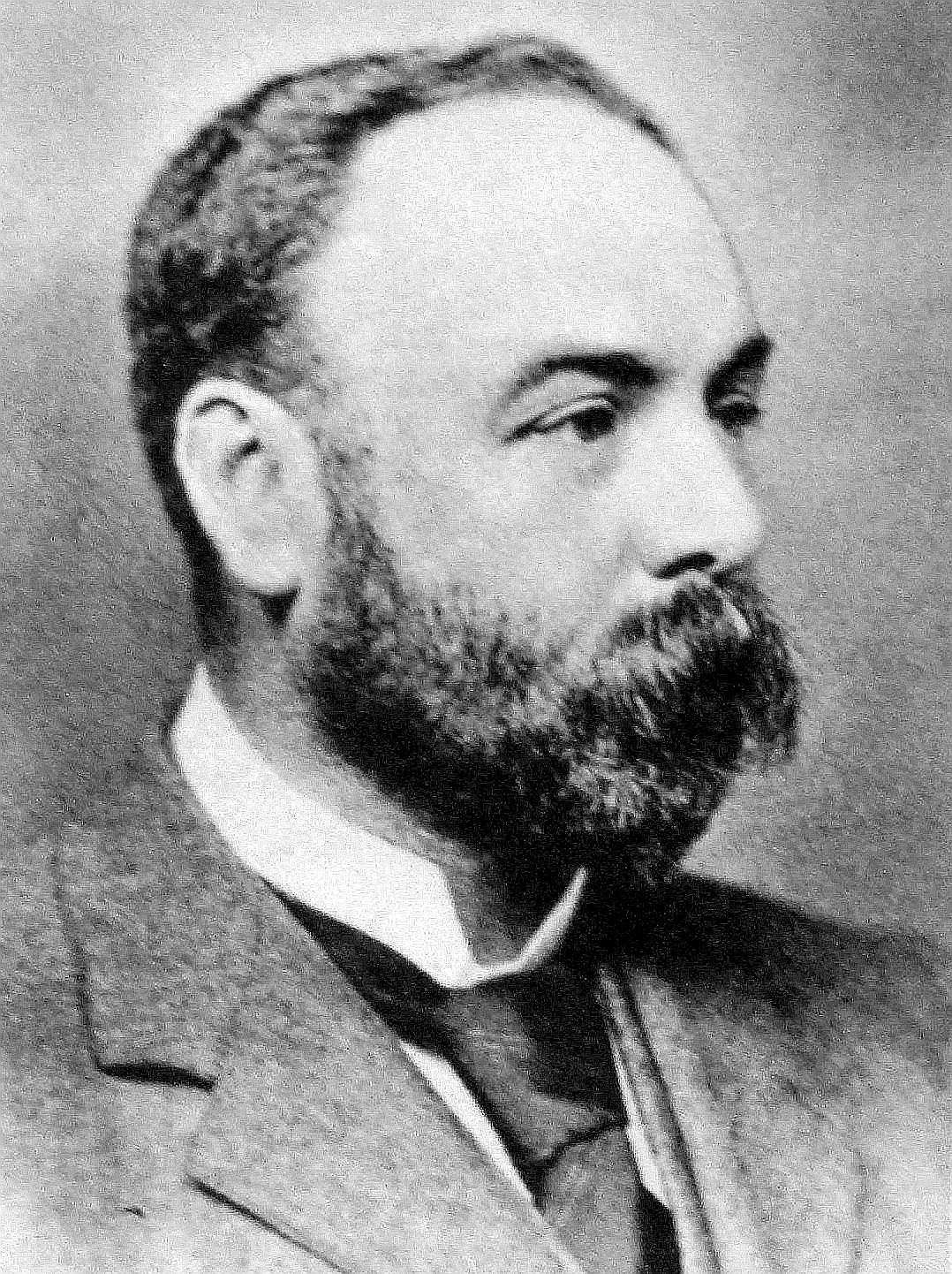
- Woolfall in 1908

2nd President of FIFA
- In office 4 June 1906 – 24 October 1918
- Preceded by: Robert Guérin
- Succeeded by: Jules Rimet

Personal details
- Born: Daniel Burley Woolfall; 15 June 1852
- Died: 24 October 1918 (aged 66)
- Occupation: Football administrator

Daniel Burley Woolfall (15 June 1852 – 24 October 1918) was an English football executive and the second president of FIFA.

An English Football Association administrator from Blackburn, Woolfall was elected as FIFA president on 4 June 1906. A key aim during his FIFA presidency was to achieve uniform football rules on an international level and he played a prominent role in the drafting of FIFA's new constitution. Under Woolfall, the application of the Laws of the Game, established under the English model, became compulsory and a clear definition was made of international matches.

Two years after assuming the presidency, Woolfall helped to organise the first noteworthy international football competition, the 1908 Olympic Games, which took place in London, England.

Woolfall's tenure as FIFA president brought the arrival of FIFA's first non-European members (from South Africa, Argentina, Chile and the United States), but was interrupted by the outbreak of the First World War.

Woolfall's FIFA presidency ended with his death in October 1918.
