= List of FIFA members =

FIFA, the world governing body of association football, has 211 member countries and territories; that number is higher than that of the 193 member states of the United Nations, because FIFA previously allowed non sovereign countries or territories to become members, though that is no longer the case (only sovereign countries are now allowed to become new members of FIFA).

There are 26 countries and territories that are members of FIFA while not being members of the United Nations: American Samoa, Anguilla, Aruba, Bermuda, British Virgin Islands, Cayman Islands, Chinese Taipei, Cook Islands, Curaçao, England, Faroe Islands, Gibraltar, Guam, Hong Kong, Kosovo, Macau, Montserrat, New Caledonia, Northern Ireland, Palestine, Puerto Rico, Scotland, Tahiti, Turks and Caicos, US Virgin Islands, and Wales.

Conversely, there are 8 (eight) United Nations member states which are not members of FIFA: Federated States of Micronesia, Kiribati, Marshall Islands, Monaco, Nauru, Palau, Tuvalu, and the United Kingdom. (The four UK constituent countries – England, Northern Ireland, Scotland and Wales – are members instead, as are several British Overseas Territories.). Although Kiribati and Tuvalu are not FIFA members, they are both OFC associate members.

One of the two United Nations General Assembly observer states, the Holy See (sovereign over Vatican City) is also not a member of a FIFA.

== List of current FIFA members ==
Member state	Body	Notes
Afghanistan	Afghanistan Football Federation	
Albania	Albanian Football Association	
Algeria	Algerian Football Federation	
American Samoa	Football Federation American Samoa	Not a member of the UN; an unincorporated territory of the USA
Andorra	Andorran Football Federation	
Angola	Angolan Football Federation	
Anguilla	Anguilla Football Association	Not a member of the UN; a British Overseas Territory
Antigua and Barbuda	Antigua and Barbuda Football Association	
Argentina	Argentine Football Association	
Armenia	Football Federation of Armenia	
Aruba	Aruba Football Federation	Not a member of the UN; a constituent country of the Kingdom of the Netherlands
Australia	Football Australia	
Austria	Austrian Football Association	
Azerbaijan	Association of Football Federations of Azerbaijan	
Bahamas	Bahamas Football Association	
Bahrain	Bahrain Football Association	
Bangladesh	Bangladesh Football Federation	
Barbados	Barbados Football Association	
Belarus	Football Federation of Belarus	
Belgium	Royal Belgian Football Association	
Belize	Football Federation of Belize	
Benin	Benin Football Federation	
Bermuda	Bermuda Football Association	Not a member of the UN; a British Overseas Territory
Bhutan	Bhutan Football Federation	
Bolivia	Bolivian Football Federation	
Bosnia and Herzegovina	Football Federation of Bosnia and Herzegovina	
Botswana	Botswana Football Association	
Brazil	Brazilian Football Confederation	
British Virgin Islands	British Virgin Islands Football Association	Not a member of the UN; a British Overseas Territory
Brunei Darussalam	Football Association of Brunei Darussalam	
Bulgaria	Bulgarian Football Union	
Burkina Faso	Burkinabé Football Federation	
Burundi	Football Federation of Burundi	
Cabo Verde	Cape Verdean Football Federation	
Cambodia	Football Federation of Cambodia	
Cameroon	Cameroonian Football Federation	
Canada	Canadian Soccer Association	
Cayman Islands	Cayman Islands Football Association	Not a member of the UN; a British Overseas Territory
Central African Republic	Central African Football Federation	
Chad	Chadian Football Federation	
Chile	Chilean Football Federation	
China PR	Chinese Football Association	
Chinese Taipei	Chinese Taipei Football Association	Not a UN member; represents the island of Taiwan, which claims to be the Republic of China, but whose territory is claimed in whole by the People's Republic of China
Colombia	Colombian Football Federation	
Comoros	Comoros Football Federation	
Congo	Congolese Football Federation	
Congo DR	Congolese Association Football Federation	
Cook Islands	Cook Islands Football Association	Non member state of the UN, in free association with New Zealand
Costa Rica	Costa Rican Football Federation	
Côte d'Ivoire	Ivorian Football Federation	
Croatia	Croatian Football Federation	
Cuba	Football Association of Cuba	
Curaçao	Curaçao Football Federation	Not a member of the UN; a constituent country of the Kingdom of the Netherlands
Cyprus	Cyprus Football Association	
Czechia	Football Association of the Czech Republic	
Denmark	Danish Football Association	
Djibouti	Djiboutian Football Federation	
Dominica	Dominica Football Association	
Dominican Republic	Dominican Football Federation	
DPR Korea	DPR Korea Football Association	
Ecuador	Ecuadorian Football Federation	
Egypt	Egyptian Football Association	
El Salvador	Salvadoran Football Association	
England	The Football Association	Not a UN member; a constituent country of the United Kingdom
Equatorial Guinea	Equatoguinean Football Federation	
Eritrea	Eritrean National Football Federation	
Estonia	Estonian Football Association	
Eswatini	Eswatini Football Association	
Ethiopia	Ethiopian Football Federation	
Faroe Islands	Faroe Islands Football Association	Not a UN member, an autonomous territory of the Kingdom of Denmark
Fiji	Fiji Football Association	
Finland	Football Association of Finland	
France	French Football Federation	
Gabon	Gabonese Football Federation	
Georgia	Georgian Football Federation	
Germany	German Football Association	
Ghana	Ghana Football Association	
Gibraltar	Gibraltar Football Association	Not a UN member; a British Overseas Territory
Greece	Hellenic Football Federation	
Grenada	Grenada Football Association	
Guam	Guam Football Association	Not a UN member; an unincorporated territory of the USA
Guatemala	National Football Federation of Guatemala	
Guinea	Guinean Football Federation	
Guinea-Bissau	Football Federation of Guinea-Bissau	
Guyana	Guyana Football Federation	
Haiti	Haitian Football Federation	
Honduras	National Autonomous Federation of Football of Honduras	
Hong Kong	Hong Kong Football Association	Not a UN member; a special administrative region of China
Hungary	Hungarian Football Federation	
Iceland	Football Association of Iceland	
India	All India Football Federation	
Indonesia	Football Association of Indonesia	
Iran	Football Federation Islamic Republic of Iran	
Iraq	Iraq Football Association	
Ireland	Football Association of Ireland	
Israel	Israel Football Association	
Italy	Italian Football Federation	
Jamaica	Jamaica Football Federation	
Japan	Japan Football Association	
Jordan	Jordan Football Association	
Kazakhstan	Football Federation of Kazakhstan	
Kenya	Football Kenya Federation	
Korea Republic	Korea Football Association	
Kosovo	Football Federation of Kosovo	Not a UN member; whole territory claimed by Serbia
Kuwait	Kuwait Football Association	
Kyrgyzstan	Football Federation of the Kyrgyz Republic	
Laos	Lao Football Federation	
Latvia	Latvian Football Federation	
Lebanon	Lebanon Football Association	
Lesotho	Lesotho Football Association	
Liberia	Liberia Football Association	
Libya	Libyan Football Federation	
Liechtenstein	Liechtenstein Football Association	
Lithuania	Lithuanian Football Federation	
Luxembourg	Luxembourg Football Federation	
Macau	Macau Football Association	Not a UN member; a special administrative region of China
Madagascar	Malagasy Football Federation	
Malawi	Football Association of Malawi	
Malaysia	Football Association of Malaysia	
Maldives	Football Association of Maldives	
Mali	Malian Football Federation	
Malta	Malta Football Association	
Mauritania	Football Federation of the Islamic Republic of Mauritania	
Mauritius	Mauritius Football Association	
Mexico	Mexican Football Federation	
Moldova	Football Association of Moldova	
Mongolia	Mongolian Football Federation	
Montenegro	Football Association of Montenegro	
Montserrat	Montserrat Football Association	Not a member of the UN; a British Overseas Territory
Morocco	Royal Moroccan Football Federation	
Mozambique	Mozambican Football Federation	
Myanmar	Myanmar Football Federation	
Namibia	Namibia Football Association	
Nepal	All Nepal Football Association	
Netherlands	Royal Dutch Football Association	
New Caledonia	New Caledonian Football Federation	Not a UN member; French territory
New Zealand	New Zealand Football	
Nicaragua	Nicaraguan Football Federation	
Niger	Nigerien Football Federation	
Nigeria	Nigeria Football Federation	
North Macedonia	Football Federation of Macedonia	
Northern Ireland	Irish Football Association	Not a UN member; a constituent country of the United Kingdom
Norway	Football Association of Norway	
Oman	Oman Football Association	
Pakistan	Pakistan Football Federation	
Palestine	Palestinian Football Association	An observer state of the United Nations General Assembly. Affiliated on 17 May 1929 and recognised by FIFA's government on 6 July 1929.
Panama	Panamanian Football Federation	
Papua New Guinea	Papua New Guinea Football Association	
Paraguay	Paraguayan Football Association	
Peru	Peruvian Football Federation	
Philippines	Philippine Football Federation	
Poland	Polish Football Association	
Portugal	Portuguese Football Federation	
Puerto Rico	Puerto Rican Football Federation	Not a member of the UN; an unincorporated territory of the USA
Qatar	Qatar Football Association	
Romania	Romanian Football Federation	
Russia	Russian Football Union	
Rwanda	Rwandese Association Football Federation	
Saint Kitts and Nevis	St. Kitts and Nevis Football Association	
Saint Lucia	Saint Lucia Football Association	
Saint Vincent and the Grenadines	Saint Vincent and the Grenadines Football Federation	
Samoa	Football Federation Samoa	
San Marino	San Marino Football Federation	
Sao Tome and Principe	São Toméan Football Federation	
Saudi Arabia	Saudi Arabian Football Federation	
Scotland	Scottish Football Association	Not a UN member; a constituent country of the United Kingdom
Senegal	Senegalese Football Federation	
Serbia	Football Association of Serbia	
Seychelles	Seychelles Football Federation	
Sierra Leone	Sierra Leone Football Association	
Singapore	Football Association of Singapore	
Slovakia	Slovak Football Association	
Slovenia	Football Association of Slovenia	
Solomon Islands	Solomon Islands Football Federation	
Somalia	Somali Football Federation	
South Africa	South African Football Association	
South Sudan	South Sudan Football Association	
Spain	Royal Spanish Football Federation	
Sri Lanka	Football Federation of Sri Lanka	
Sudan	Sudan Football Association	
Suriname	Surinamese Football Association	
Sweden	Swedish Football Association	
Switzerland	Swiss Football Association	
Syria	Syrian Football Association	
Tahiti	Tahitian Football Federation	Not a UN member; largest island of French Polynesia, an overseas collectivity of France and its sole overseas country, classified as a non-self-governing territory by the United Nations
Tajikistan	Tajikistan Football Federation	
Tanzania	Tanzania Football Federation	
Thailand	Football Association of Thailand	
The Gambia	Gambia Football Association	
Timor-Leste	East Timor Football Federation	
Togo	Togolese Football Federation	
Tonga	Tonga Football Association	
Trinidad and Tobago	Trinidad and Tobago Football Association	
Tunisia	Tunisian Football Federation	
Türkiye	Turkish Football Federation	
Turkmenistan	Football Federation of Turkmenistan	
Turks and Caicos Islands	Turks and Caicos Islands Football Association	Not a member of the UN; a British Overseas Territory
Uganda	Federation of Uganda Football Associations	
Ukraine	Football Federation of Ukraine	
United Arab Emirates	United Arab Emirates Football Association	
United States of America	United States Soccer Federation	
Uruguay	Uruguayan Football Association	
US Virgin Islands	U.S. Virgin Islands Soccer Federation	Not a UN member; an unincorporated territory of the USA
Uzbekistan	Uzbekistan Football Federation	
Vanuatu	Vanuatu Football Federation	
Venezuela	Venezuelan Football Federation	
Vietnam	Vietnam Football Federation	
Wales	Football Association of Wales	Not a UN member; a constituent country of the United Kingdom
Yemen	Yemen Football Association	
Zambia	Football Association of Zambia	
Zimbabwe	Zimbabwe Football Association	
