= FIFA =

International governing body of association football

- Fédération Internationale de Football Association

- Map of FIFA confederations and their members
- Founded: 21 May 1904; 122 years ago
- Founder: Robert Guérin
- Founded at: Paris, France
- Type: Sports governing body
- Headquarters: Global office: Zurich, Switzerland; Continental offices: Rabat, Morocco (Africa); Paris, France (Europe); Jakarta, Indonesia (Asia-Pacific); Miami, United States (Americas)
- Coordinates: 47°22′53″N 8°34′28″E
- Members: 211 member associations
- President: Gianni Infantino
- Senior vice-president: Salman bin Ibrahim Al Khalifa (AFC)
- Vice-presidents: Alejandro Domínguez (CONMEBOL); Aleksander Čeferin (UEFA); Lambert Maltock (OFC); Patrice Motsepe (CAF); Victor Montagliani (CONCACAF); Sándor Csányi (UEFA); Debbie Hewitt (UEFA)
- Secretary general: Mattias Grafström
- Main organ: FIFA Congress
- Subsidiaries: AFC (Asia); CAF (Africa); CONCACAF (North, Central America and Caribbean); CONMEBOL (South America); OFC (Oceania); UEFA (Europe)
- Affiliations: International Olympic Committee; International Football Association Board
- Staff: 700+
- Website: www.fifa.com

The Fédération Internationale de Football Association (Note: French pronunciation: [fedeʁasjɔ̃ ɛ̃tɛʁnasjɔnal də futbol asɔsjasjɔ̃]; Spanish: Federación Internacional de Fútbol Asociación; Portuguese: Federação Internacional de Futebol Associação; lit. 'International Association Football Federation') (FIFA) (Note: French pronunciation: [fifa] /ˈfiːfə/ FEE-fə) (French for 'Federation international football association') is an international self-regulatory governing body of association football, beach soccer, and futsal. It was founded on 21 May 1904 to oversee international competition among the national associations of Belgium, Denmark, France, Germany, the Netherlands, Spain, Sweden, and Switzerland. Headquartered in Zurich, Switzerland, its membership now comprises 211 national associations. These national associations must also be members of one of the six regional confederations: CAF (Africa), AFC (Asia), UEFA (Europe), CONCACAF (North and Central America and the Caribbean), OFC (Oceania), and CONMEBOL (South America).

FIFA has several objectives in its organisational statutes, including growing the game internationally, ensuring it is accessible to everyone, and advocating for integrity and fair play. It is responsible for organising and promoting association football's major international tournaments, notably the World Cup which began in 1930, and the Women's World Cup which commenced in 1991.

FIFA is a member of the International Football Association Board, which is responsible for the laws of the game, and FIFA applies and enforces the rules across its competitions. FIFA tournaments generate revenue from sponsorships; in 2022, FIFA had revenues of over US$5.8 billion, ending the 2019–2022 cycle with a net positive of $1.2 billion, and cash reserves of over $3.9 billion.

== History ==
The need for a single body to oversee association football became increasingly apparent at the beginning of the 20th century with the increasing popularity of international fixtures. The Fédération Internationale de Football Association (FIFA) was founded in the rear of the headquarters of the Union des Sociétés Françaises de Sports Athlétiques (USFSA) at the Rue Saint Honoré 229 in Paris on 21 May 1904. The French name and acronym are universally adopted outside French-speaking countries. The founding members were the national associations of Belgium, Denmark, France, the Netherlands, Spain (represented by then-Real Madrid CF; the Royal Spanish Football Federation was not created until 1913), Sweden and Switzerland.

On the same day, the German Football Association declared through a telegram its intention to affiliate.

The first president of FIFA was Robert Guérin. Guérin was replaced in 1906 by Daniel Burley Woolfall from England, by then a member of the association. The first tournament FIFA staged, the association football competition for the 1908 Olympics in London was more successful than its Olympic predecessors, despite the presence of professional footballers, contrary to the founding principles of FIFA.

Membership of FIFA expanded beyond Europe with the application of South Africa in 1909, Argentina in 1912, Canada and Chile in 1913, and the United States in 1914.

The 1912 Spalding Athletic Library "Official Guide" includes information on the 1912 Olympics (scores and stories), AAFA, and FIFA. The 1912 FIFA president was Dan B Woolfall. Daniel Burley Woolfall was president from 1906 to 1918.

During World War I, with many players sent off to war and the possibility of travel for international fixtures severely limited, the organisation's survival was in doubt. Post-war, following the death of Woolfall, the organisation was run by Dutchman Carl Hirschmann. It was saved from extinction but at the cost of the withdrawal of the Home Nations (of the United Kingdom), who cited an unwillingness to participate in international competitions with their World War enemies. The Home Nations later resumed their membership. The FIFA collection is held by the National Football Museum at Urbis in Manchester, England. The first World Cup was held in 1930 in Montevideo, Uruguay.

== Identity ==
=== Flag ===
Fédération internationale de football association
- Use: Sport
- Proportion: 3:5
- Adopted: 2018; 8 years ago
- Design: Blue field with a FIFA logo

The FIFA flag is blue, with the organization's wordmark logo in the middle. The current FIFA flag was first flown during the 2018 FIFA World Cup opening ceremony in Moscow, Russia.

=== Anthem ===
Akin to the UEFA Champions League, FIFA has adopted an anthem composed by the German composer Franz Lambert since the 1994 FIFA World Cup. It has been re-arranged and produced by Rob May and Simon Hill. The FIFA Anthem is played at the beginning of official FIFA sanctioned matches and tournaments such as international friendlies, the FIFA World Cup, FIFA Women's World Cup, FIFA U-20 World Cup, FIFA U-17 World Cup, Football at the Summer Olympics, FIFA U-20 Women's World Cup, FIFA Women's U-17 World Cup, FIFA Futsal World Cup, FIFA Beach Soccer World Cup and FIFA Club World Cup.

Since 2007, FIFA has also required most of its broadcast partners to use short sequences including the anthem at the beginning and end of FIFA event coverage and for break bumpers to help promote FIFA's sponsors. This emulates practices long used by international football events, such as the UEFA Champions League. Exceptions may be made for specific circumstances; for example, an original piece of African music was used for bumpers during the 2010 FIFA World Cup.

== Presidents of FIFA ==
No	Name	Country	Took office	Left office	Time in office	Note
1	Robert Guérin	France	23 May 1904	4 June 1906	2 years, 12 days	
2	Daniel Burley Woolfall	England	4 June 1906	24 October 1918	12 years, 142 days	Died in office
—	Cornelis August Wilhelm Hirschman	Netherlands	24 October 1918	1920	1 year, 309 days	Acting
3	Jules Rimet	France	1 March 1921	21 June 1954	33 years, 112 days	
4	Rodolphe Seeldrayers	Belgium	21 June 1954	7 October 1955	1 year, 108 days	Died in office
5	Arthur Drewry	England	9 June 1956	25 March 1961	4 years, 289 days	Died in office
—	Ernst Thommen	Switzerland	25 March 1961	28 September 1961	187 days	Acting
6	Stanley Rous	England	28 September 1961	8 May 1974	12 years, 222 days	
7	João Havelange	Brazil	8 May 1974	8 June 1998	24 years, 31 days	
8	Sepp Blatter	Switzerland	8 June 1998	8 October 2015	17 years, 122 days	Expelled
—	Issa Hayatou	Cameroon	8 October 2015	26 February 2016	141 days	Acting
9	Gianni Infantino	Italy; Switzerland; Lebanon	26 February 2016		10 years, 267 days	Incumbent

== Structure ==
=== Six confederations and 222 national associations ===
Besides its worldwide institutions, there are six confederations recognized by FIFA which oversee the game in the different continents and regions of the world. National associations, and not the continental confederations, are members of FIFA. The continental confederations are provided for in FIFA's statutes, and membership of a union is a prerequisite to FIFA membership.

- Asian Football Confederation (AFC; 47 members - 46 are FIFA members) (Note: Australia has been a member of the AFC since 2006.)
- Confederation of African Football (CAF; 54 members (all FIFA members) + 2 associate members)
- Confederation of North, Central American and Caribbean Association Football (CONCACAF; 41 members - 35 are FIFA members) (Note: French Guiana, Guyana and Suriname are CONCACAF members although they are in South America. The French Guiana team is a member of CONCACAF but not of FIFA.)
- Confederación Sudamericana de Fútbol (CONMEBOL; 10 members - all FIFA members)
- Oceania Football Confederation (OFC; 13 members - 11 are FIFA members)
- Union of European Football Associations (UEFA; 55 members - all are FIFA Members) (Note: Teams representing the nations of Armenia, Azerbaijan, Cyprus, Georgia, Israel, Kazakhstan, Russia (suspended by UEFA in 2022), and Turkey are UEFA members, although the majority or entirety of their territory is outside of continental Europe. Monaco is not a member of UEFA or FIFA.)

In total, FIFA recognizes 211 national associations and their associated men's national teams as well as 204 women's national teams; see the list of national football teams and their respective country codes. The number of FIFA member associations is higher than the number of UN member states as FIFA has admitted associations from 23 non-sovereign entities as members in their own right, such as the four Home Nations within the United Kingdom and the two special administrative regions of China: Hong Kong and Macau.

FIFA can suspend countries due to numerous multifaceted issues. Common reasons include governance interference, corruption, and financial irregularities. Doping or the misappropriation of drugs is also a consideration for expulsion. FIFA suspended Russia from all competitions after the 2022 Russian invasion of Ukraine. The FIFA Men's World Rankings are updated six times each year and rank each team based on their performance in international competitions, qualifiers, and friendly matches. The FIFA Women's World Rankings are updated on a quarterly schedule.

=== Laws and governance ===
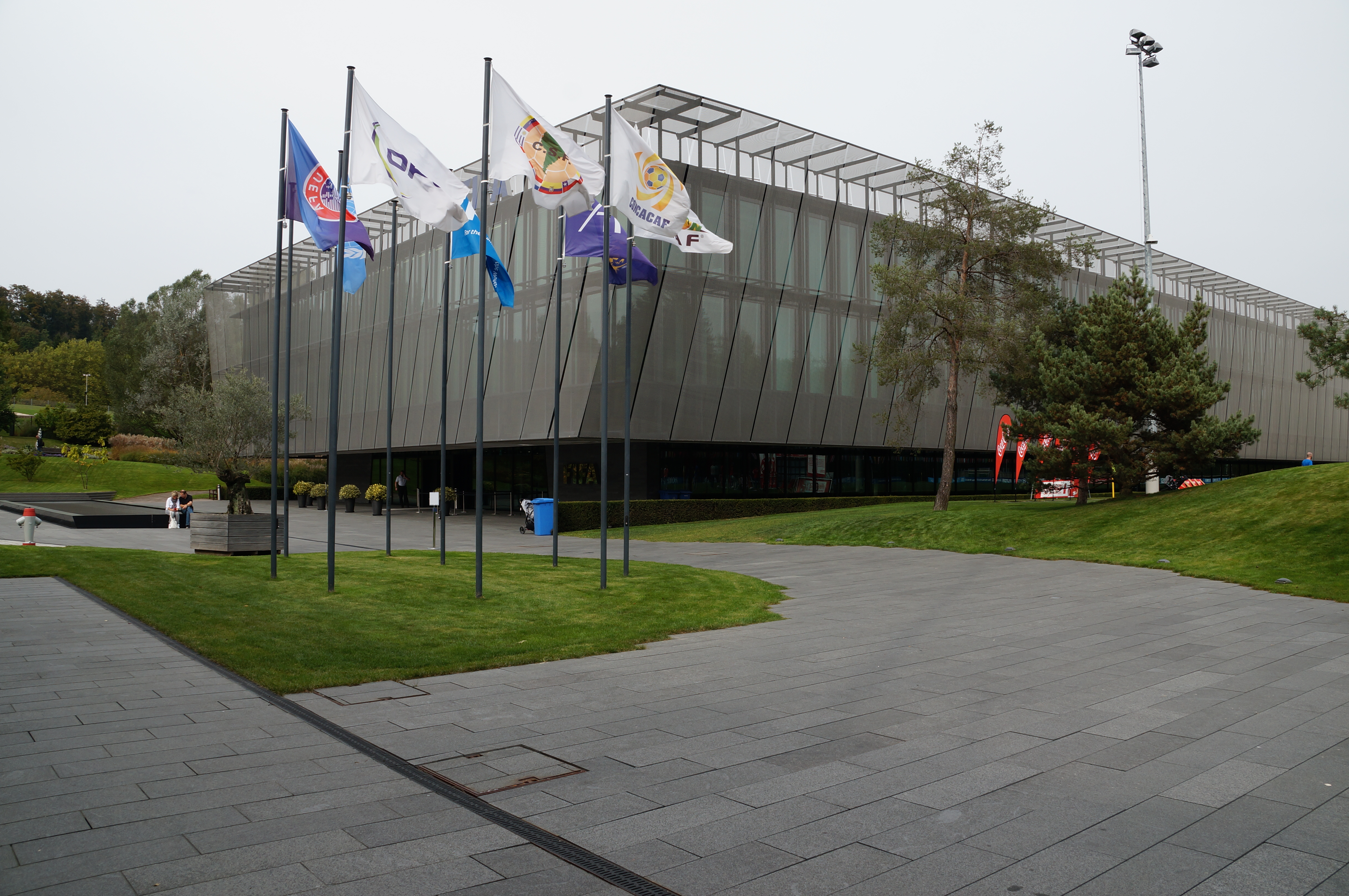
FIFA headquarters in Zürich, Switzerland

FIFA headquarters is in Zürich, and it is an association established under the law of Switzerland.

FIFA's supreme body is the FIFA Congress, an assembly of representatives from each affiliated member association. Each national football association has one vote, regardless of size or footballing strength. The Congress assembles in ordinary sessions once every year, and extraordinary sessions have been held once a year since 1998. Congress makes decisions relating to FIFA's governing statutes and their method of implementation and application. Only Congress can pass changes to FIFA's statutes. The congress approves the annual report and decides on the acceptance of new national associations, and holds elections. Congress elects the President of FIFA, its general secretary, and the other members of the FIFA Council in the year following the FIFA World Cup.

The FIFA Council – formerly called the FIFA Executive Committee – is the organisation's main strategic body, making decisions in the intervals between Congress meetings. The council comprises 37 people: the president, who chairs the Council; 8 vice-presidents; and 28 members from the confederations. Each confederation must elect at least one woman to the Council. Six of the Vice-Presidents hold the role ex officio as the Presidents of the Confederations, and the remaining two must come from UEFA. The Council reviews the bids to host the World Cup and proposes up to three of these to the Congress, which votes to select the host country or countries.

The President and the Secretary General are the main office holders of FIFA and are in charge of its daily administration, carried out by the general secretariat, with its staff of approximately 280 members. Gianni Infantino is the current president, elected on 26 February 2016 at an extraordinary FIFA Congress session after former president Sepp Blatter was suspended pending a corruption investigation.

FIFA's worldwide organizational structure also consists of several other bodies under the authority of the FIFA Council or created by Congress as standing committees. Among those bodies are the Finance Committee, and Referees Committee, as well as independent judicial bodies the Disciplinary Committee, and the FIFA Ethics Committee.

The FIFA Emergency Committee deals with all matters requiring immediate settlement in the time frame between the regular meetings of the FIFA Council. The Emergency Committee consists of the FIFA president as well as one member from each confederation. Emergency Committee decisions made are immediately put into legal effect, although they need to be ratified at the next Executive Committee meeting.

Between 1994 and 2017, FIFA's independent research arm, the FIFA Medical Assessment and Research Centre (F-MARC), led global sports medicine initiatives. The centre standardized injury surveillance, developed the widespread "FIFA 11+" injury prevention warm-up programme, and established the medical evidence that led to mandatory cooling breaks during matches in extreme heat.

=== Administrative cost ===
FIFA publishes its results according to International Financial Reporting Standards. The total compensation for the management committee in 2011 was 30 million for 35 people. Blatter, the only full-time person on the committee, earned approximately two million Swiss francs, 1.2 million in salary, and the rest in bonuses. A report in London's The Sunday Times in June 2014 said the members of the committee had their salaries doubled from $100,000 to $200,000 during the year. The report also said leaked documents had indicated $4.4 million in secret bonuses had been paid to the committee members following the 2010 FIFA World Cup in South Africa.

== Governance ==
The laws that govern football, known officially as the Laws of the Game, are not solely the responsibility of FIFA; they are maintained by a body called the International Football Association Board (IFAB). FIFA has members on its board (four representatives); the other four are provided by the football associations of England, Scotland, Wales, and Northern Ireland, who jointly established IFAB in 1882 and are recognized for the creation and history of the game. Changes to the Laws of the Game must be agreed upon by at least six delegates.

The FIFA Statutes form the overarching document guiding FIFA's governing system. The governing system is divided into separate bodies with the appropriate powers to create a system of checks and balances. It consists of four general bodies: the Congress, the executive committee, the general Secretariat, and standing and ad hoc committees.

=== Discipline of national associations ===
FIFA frequently takes active roles in the running of the sport and developing the game around the world. One of its sanctions is to suspend teams and associated members from international competition when a government interferes in the running of FIFA's associate member organizations or if the associate is not functioning correctly.

A 2007 FIFA ruling that a player can be registered with a maximum of three clubs and appear in official matches for a maximum of two in a year measured from 1 July to 30 June has led to controversy, especially in those countries whose seasons cross that date barrier, as in the case of two former Ireland internationals. As a direct result of this controversy, FIFA modified this ruling the following year to accommodate transfers between leagues with out-of-phase seasons.

=== Video replay and goal-line technology ===
FIFA now permits the use of video evidence during matches, as well as for subsequent sanctions. However, for most of FIFA's history it stood opposed to its use. The 1970 meeting of the International Football Association Board "agreed to request the television authorities to refrain from any slow-motion play-back which reflected, or might reflect, adversely on any decision of the referee". As recently as 2008 FIFA president Sepp Blatter said: "Let it be as it is and let's leave [football] with errors. The television companies will have the right to say [the referee] was right or wrong, but still, the referee makes the decision – a man, not a machine." This stance was finally overturned on 3 March 2018, when the IFAB wrote video assistant referees (also known as VARs) into the Laws of the Game permanently. Their use remains optional for competitions.

In early July 2012 FIFA sanctioned the use of goal-line technology, subject to rules specified by the International Football Association Board (IFAB), who had officially approved its use by amending the Laws of the Game to permit (but not require) its use. This followed a high-profile incident during a second-round game in the 2010 FIFA World Cup between England and Germany, where a shot by Englishman Frank Lampard, which would have levelled the scores at 2–2 in a match that ultimately ended in a 4–1 German victory, crossed the line but was not seen to do so by the match officials, which led FIFA officials to declare that they would re-examine the use of goal-line technology.

== Corruption ==
The 2015 FIFA corruption scandal exposed a widespread bribery and corruption scheme within FIFA. This scandal implicated over two dozen FIFA officials and associates in a 24-year self-enrichment scheme that reached the highest levels of FIFA management. The scandal damaged its reputation and prompting widespread calls for significant reforms in the governance of international football.

After the 2022 Russian invasion of Ukraine, by a recommendation by the International Olympic Committee (IOC), FIFA suspended the participation of Russia. The Russian Football Union unsuccessfully appealed the FIFA ban to the Court of Arbitration for Sport, which upheld the ban.

In 2024 allegations against FIFA were made by 420 players from several countries claiming the organisation did not pay them agreed sums of money, the total reaching up to £3 million.

For the first time since 1962, FIFA rescinded a World Cup red-card suspension in 2026 after United States forward Folarin Balogun was sent off against Bosnia and Herzegovina. The reversal prompted criticism from football officials and governing bodies, who expressed concern that the decision could undermine confidence in FIFA's disciplinary process.

In 2026, in an effort create a $20 billion private commercial subsidiary, FIFA President Gianni Infantino proposed plans to sell a minority stake of FIFA Forward Enterprise (FFE), an event management company, to private investors. Infantino's proposal was ultimately discontinued after heavy opposition and boycott threats from multiple football associations.

=== Anti-corruption initiatives ===
Since the 2010s, FIFA has implemented a variety of initiatives – such as the FIFA Ethics Committee – to combat corruption in international football to mixed results. FIFA banned Indonesia in 2015 due to government intervention within the team. FIFA faced public scrutiny in 2017 after the dismissal of ethics committee chairs Cornel Borbély and Hans-Joachim Eckert who claimed that the organization was unwilling to maintain an independent ethics office.

== Recognition and awards ==
FIFA holds an annual awards ceremony, The Best FIFA Football Awards since 2016, which recognizes both individual and team achievements in international association football. Individually, the top men's player is awarded The Best FIFA Men's Player, and the top women's player is The Best FIFA Women's Player. Other prominent awards are The Best FIFA Football Coach and FIFA FIFPRO World 11.

FIFA presents many other awards each year, including the Ballon d'Or (which is jointly presented with the French Football Federation), given to the best and most popular player. The FIFA Puskás Award honors the most beautiful goal of the year, while the Golden Glove is awarded to the top-performing goalkeeper at each World Cup. Other notable awards include The FIFA Team of The Year, FIFA Player of The Century, and the Golden Boy award.

In 2000, FIFA presented two awards, FIFA Club of the Century and FIFA Player of the Century, to decide the greatest football club and player of the 20th century. Real Madrid was the club winner, while Diego Maradona and Pelé were the joint Player of the Century winners.

=== FIFA Peace Prize ===
On 6 November 2025, FIFA announced the creation of its FIFA Peace Prize—"an award to recognise exceptional actions for peace and unity... bestowed on behalf of all football-loving people from all around the world". At the 2026 World Cup draw in Washington, D.C., on 5 December 2025, the inaugural prize was presented to Donald Trump, president of the United States, by head of FIFA Gianni Infantino. The creation of the prize and the choice of Trump as its first recipient generated widespread ridicule, scrutiny and controversy. Human rights groups, analysts, and soccer stakeholders questioned the transparency of the selection process, the suitability of the inaugural laureate, and the implications both for FIFA's claims of political neutrality and its human rights commitments.

== FIFA variants ==
1. Association football: Recognized 1904 (men), 1988 (women)
2. Futsal: Recognized 1986 (men), 2023 (women)
3. Esports: Recognized 2004
4. Beach soccer: Recognized 2005 (men), 2019 (women)

== Tournaments ==
=== National teams ===
Men's

- FIFA World Cup
- FIFA U-20 World Cup
- FIFA U-17 World Cup
- FIFA U-15 World Cup & Festival
- Men's Olympic Football Tournament (U-23)
- FIFA Futsal World Cup
- FIFA Beach Soccer World Cup
- FIFA Arab Cup (senior teams of the UAFA)
- FIFA ASEAN Cup
- FIFA Series (friendly matches)
- FIFA Youth Series (friendly matches)

Women's

- FIFA Women's World Cup
- FIFA U-20 Women's World Cup
- FIFA U-17 Women's World Cup
- FIFA U-15 Women's World Cup & Festival
- Women's Olympic Football Tournament
- FIFA Futsal Women's World Cup
- FIFA Series (friendly matches)

=== Clubs ===
Men's

- FIFA Club World Cup
- FIFA Intercontinental Cup

Women's

- FIFA Women's Club World Cup
- FIFA Women's Champions Cup

=== eSports ===
Individual

- FIFAe World Cup

Team

- FIFAe Club World Cup (FIFAe Club Series)
- FIFAe Nations Cup (FIFAe Nations Series)
- FIFAe Continental Cup

=== Former tournaments ===
- FIFA Confederations Cup
- Blue Stars/FIFA Youth Cup (Note: FIFA stopped sponsoring this tournament and it was renamed back to the Blue Stars Zurich Youth Cup.)

==== One-off tournaments ====
- FIFA World Champions' Gold Cup (Note: Also known as Mundialito.)
- FIFA Women's Invitation Tournament

== Current title holders ==
Competition	Year	Champions	Details	Runners-up	Next
Men's national teams
FIFA World Cup (qualification)	2026 (qual.)	Spain	Final	Argentina	2030 (qual.)
Men's Olympic Football Tournament (U-23)	2024 (qual.)	Spain	Final	France	2028 (qual.)
FIFA U-20 World Cup	2025 (qual.)	Morocco	Final	Argentina	2027 (qual.)
FIFA U-17 World Cup	2025 (qual.)	Portugal	Final	Austria	2026 (qual.)
FIFA U-15 World Cup & Festival	2026 (qual.)	Spain	Final	Czech Republic	2027 (qual.)
FIFA Futsal World Cup	2024 (qual.)	Brazil	Final	Argentina	2028 (qual.)
FIFA Beach Soccer World Cup (see BSWW)	2025 (qual.)	Brazil	Final	Belarus	2027 (qual.)
FIFA Series	2026	Australia; Aruba; Azerbaijan; Bulgaria; Finland; Kazakhstan; Puerto Rico; Rwanda; Uzbekistan	RR; Final; Final; Final; RR; RR; Final; Final; RR	Cameroon; Liechtenstein; Sierra Leone; Indonesia; New Zealand; Namibia; U.S. Virgin Islands; Grenada; Venezuela	2028
FIFA Youth Series	2025	Paraguay	Final	New Zealand	2029
FIFA Arab Cup (senior teams of the UAFA (Arab world))	2025 (qual.)	Morocco	Final	Jordan	2029
FIFA ASEAN Cup (senior teams of the AFF (Southeast Asia))	2026	Indonesia	Final	Thailand	2032
Women's national teams
FIFA Women's World Cup (qualification)	2023 (qual.)	Spain	Final	England	2027 (qual.)
Women's Olympic Football Tournament	2024 (qual.)	United States	Final	Brazil	2028 (qual.)
FIFA U-20 Women's World Cup	2026 (qual.)	Spain	Final	North Korea	2028 (qual.)
FIFA U-15 Women World Cup & Festival					2027
FIFA U-17 Women's World Cup	2025 (qual.)	North Korea	Final	Netherlands	2026 (qual.)
FIFA Futsal Women's World Cup	2025 (qual.)	Brazil	Final	Portugal	2029 (qual.)
FIFA Series	2026	Australia; Brazil; Ivory Coast; Thailand	Final; RR; RR; Final	Kenya; Canada; Mauritania; DR Congo	2028
Men's club teams
FIFA Club World Cup	2025 (qual.)	Chelsea (England)	Final	(France) Paris Saint-Germain	2029 (qual.)
FIFA Intercontinental Cup	2025	Paris Saint-Germain (France)	Final	(Brazil) Flamengo	2026
Women's club teams
FIFA Women's Club World Cup	—	—	—	—	2028
FIFA Women's Champions Cup	2026	Arsenal (England)	Final	(Brazil) Corinthians	2027

=== eSports ===
Competition	Season	Game	Winner (Player/Gamer ID)	Details	Runner-up (Player/Gamer ID)	Next season
Esports
FIFAe World Cup	2023	EA Sports FIFA 23	ManuBachoore - Manuel Bachoore (Netherlands)	Final	(Australia) Mark Zakhary - Mark11	N/A (Note: Beginning in 2024 the FIFAe World Cup was not held for a simulation football title officially licensed by FIFA, as EA Sports lost the FIFA licence and the game transitioned to EA Sports FC, complete with a separate esports circuit.)
FIFAe World Cup	2024	Football Manager 2024	Ichsan Taufiq (manager), Manar Hidayat (assistant) (Indonesia)	Final	(Germany) Sven Goly (manager), Terry Whenett (assistant)	N/A (Note: Replaced by the FIFAe Club World Cup featuring Football Manager beginning in 2026.)
FIFAe World Cup	2025	Rocket League	Théo Sabiani-juicy, Axel Touret-Vatira, Alexis Bernier-Zen (France)	Final	(Saudi Arabia) Yazid Bakhashwin-Kiileerrz, Saleh Bakhashwin-Rw9, Mohammed Alotaibi-trk511	2026
FIFAe World Cup	2025	eFootball Console	Ostrybuch, Zilo, Rdk.GG (coach) (Poland)	Final	(Italy); Suprema_Ettorito, Naples, thesvnom (coach)	2026
FIFAe World Cup	2025	eFootball Mobile	JXMKT (Thailand)	Final	(Brazil) JUNINHOEFOITBALL	2026
FIFAe Club World Cup (part of the FIFAe Club Series)	2023	EA Sports FIFA 23	RBLZ Gaming (Germany)	Final	(United Kingdom) FUTWIZ	N/A (Note: Beginning in 2024 the FIFAe Club World Cup was not held for a simulation football title officially licensed by FIFA, as EA Sports lost the FIFA licence and the game transitioned to EA Sports FC, complete with a separate esports circuit.)
FIFAe Club World Cup (part of the FIFAe Club Series)	2026	Football Manager 2026		Final		2027
FIFAe Nations Series (part of the FIFAe Nations Cup)	2023	EA Sports FIFA 23	(Paulo Henrique Chaves) (Pedro Henrique Soares) (Paulo Neto) (Brazil)	Final	(Netherlands) (Levi de Weerd) (Manuel Bachoore) (Emre Yilmaz)	N/A (Note: Beginning in 2024 the FIFAe Nations Cup was not held for a simulation football title officially licensed by FIFA, as EA Sports lost the FIFA licence and the game transitioned to EA Sports FC, complete with a separate esports circuit.)
FIFAe Continental Cup	2023	FIFA Online 4	FaZe Clan (Thailand)	Final	(China) Manchester City Esports	N/A (Note: Beginning in 2024 the FIFAe Continental Cup was not held for a simulation football title officially licensed by FIFA, as EA Sports lost the FIFA licence and the game transitioned to EA Sports FC Online, with the FIFAe Continental Cup becoming the EA Sports FC Pro Champions Cup.)

== FIFA World Rankings ==
=== Men's ===
The following table has the Top 20 ranked men's football countries worldwide.

Top 20 rankings as of 18 November 2026
Rank	Change	Team	Points
1	Steady	Spain	2004.48
2	Steady	Argentina	1966.13
3	Steady	France	1950.82
4	Steady	England	1938.9
5	▲2	Morocco	1809.37
6	▼1	Portugal	1801.28
7	▼1	Brazil	1800.91
8	Steady	Belgium	1790.37
9	Steady	Netherlands	1774.06
10	▲1	Colombia	1735.9
11	▲2	Germany	1730.22
12	▲2	Switzerland	1726.15
13	▼3	Mexico	1723.64
14	▲1	Italy	1717.2
15	▼1	Croatia	1714.22
16	Steady	United States	1713.56
17	Steady	Japan	1684.61
18	Steady	Senegal	1655.34
19	Steady	Norway	1650.89
20	Steady	Uruguay	1644.48
*Change from 7 October 2026
Complete rankings at FIFA.com

=== Women's ===
The following table has the Top 20 ranked women's football countries in the world.

Top 20 rankings as of 20 October 2026
Rank	Change	Team	Points
1	Steady	Spain	2121.5
2	Steady	United States	2042.38
3	Steady	Germany	2034.62
4	Steady	England	2025.47
5	Steady	Japan	1994.43
6	Steady	France	1983.77
7	Steady	Brazil	1970.87
8	Steady	Sweden	1938.13
9	Steady	Canada	1926.96
10	▲2	Denmark	1920.14
11	▼1	Netherlands	1918.3
12	▼1	North Korea	1916.52
13	▲1	Norway	1883.31
14	▼1	Italy	1871.59
15	Steady	Australia	1831.48
16	▲1	Iceland	1799.75
17	▲2	South Korea	1791.13
18	▼2	China	1786.8
19	▲1	Colombia	1780.16
20	▼2	Belgium	1780.06
*Change from 16 June 2026
Complete rankings at FIFA.com

== Sponsors of FIFA ==
As of October 2024

=== FIFA Partners ===
- Adidas
- Aramco
- Coca-Cola
- Hyundai–Kia
- Lenovo
- Qatar Airways
- Visa

== FIFA+ ==
FIFA+
- Logo used since 2025
- Website type: OTT streaming platform
- Available in: English
- Headquarters: Paris, France
- Country of origin: France
- Owner: FIFA
- Website: DAZN
- Registration: Required
- Launched: 2022
- Current status: Active

Previous logo (2022–2025)

In April 2022 FIFA launched FIFA+, an OTT service providing up to 40,000 live matches per year, including 11,000 women's matches. It was also confirmed that FIFA would make available archival content, including every FIFA World Cup and FIFA Women's World Cup match recorded on camera, together with original documentary content. Eleven Sports was later reported to be responsible for populating the FIFA+ platform with live matches.

FIFA+ broadcast all matches of the youth World Cups in both genders, starting with the 2023 FIFA U-20 World Cup. FIFA+ also showed the 2023 FIFA Women's World Cup live in selected regions such as Japan, Brazil, Indonesia, and Thailand.

FIFA+ have the rights to competitions in Oceania including the OFC Champions League and the OFC Women's Olympic Qualifying Tournament. They also have rights to the New Zealand domestic competitions and national teams.

FIFA+ was moved to and launched exclusively on DAZN in June 2026.

=== Competitions ===
As of 16 May 2025 FIFA+ covers the following competitions:

==== International ====
- OFC Women's Champions League
- OFC U-16 Men's Championship
- OFC U-16 Women's Championship
- OFC Men's Champions League
- OFC U-19 Men's Championship
- OFC U-19 Women's Championship
- OFC Men's Nations Cup
- CAFA Nations Cup (final and third-place match only)
- UNCAF Women's Interclub Championship
- COSAFA Cup
- COSAFA Women's Champions League
- COSAFA Women's Championship
- COSAFA U-17 Youth Championship
- COSAFA U-17 Women's Championship

==== National ====
- (Albania) Kategoria Superiore
- (Albania) Kategoria e Parë
- (Albania) Albanian Cup
- (Algeria) Algerian League 2
- (Algeria) Algerian Cup
- (Algeria) Algerian Women's Championship D2
- (Aruba) Aruban Division di Honor
- (Anguilla) AFA Senior Male League
- (Australia) A-League Men
- (Australia) A-League Women
- Azerbaijan First League
- Azerbaijan Second League
- (The Bahamas) BFA Senior League
- Barbados Premier League
- Benin Premier League
- (Bermuda) Bermudian Premier Division
- Bhutan Premier League
- (British Virgin Islands) BVIFA National Football League
- (Burkina Faso) Burkinabé Premier League
- Burundi Ligue A
- (Burundi) Burundian Cup
- (Cape Verde) Cape Verdean Football Championship
- (Canada) Futsal Canadian Championship
- Cayman Islands Premier League
- Central African Republic League
- Comoros Premier League
- Djibouti Premier League
- Dominica Premier League
- (Equatorial Guinea) Equatoguinean Primera División
- Premier League of Eswatini
- (Ethiopia) Ethiopian Higher League
- Fiji Premier League
- Super League of Malawi
- (Malawi) FDH Bank Knockout Cup
- Malawi FAM Charity Shield
- (France) Ligue 3
- (France) Première Ligue
- (Gabon) National Foot 1
- (The Gambia) GFA League First Division
- (Grenada) GFA Premier League
- (Guyana) GFF Elite League
- (India) Gujarat Super League
- (India) Bandodkar Trophy
- (India) Santosh Trophy
- (Italy) Serie C
- (Italy) Coppa Italia Serie C
- (Ivory Coast) Ligue 2
- (Japan) WE League Cup
- Women's Football Superleague of Kosovo
- (Laos) Lao League 1
- (Lebanon) Lebanese Premier League
- (Lebanon) Lebanese Super Cup
- (Lebanon) Lebanese Women's Football League
- Lesotho Premier League
- (Liberia) LFA First Division
- (Liberia) Liberian FA Cup
- (Lithuania) TOPLYGA
- (Lithuania) I Lyga
- (Macau) Liga de Elite
- (Mali) Malian Première Division
- (Mali) Malian Cup
- Super Coupe National du Mali
- (Mauritania) Super D1
- (Mauritania) Mauritanian President's Cup
- (Mauritius) Mauritian Premier League
- (Mauritius) Mauritian Cup
- (Mauritius) Mauritian Republic Cup
- (Morocco) Moroccan Women's Championship D1
- New Zealand National League
- (New Zealand) Northern League
- (New Zealand) Central League
- (New Zealand) Southern League
- (New Zealand) Chatham Cup
- (New Zealand) Kate Sheppard Cup
- (Nicaragua) Liga Primera
- Segunda División de Nicaragua
- (Niger) Super Ligue
- Niger Cup
- Oman First Division League
- (Oman) Sultan Qaboos Cup
- Oman Super Cup
- Papua New Guinea Premier Soccer League
- (Saint Vincent and the Grenadines) SVGFF Premier Division
- Samoa National League
- (San Marino) Campionato Sammarinese
- (San Marino) Coppa Titano
- Seychelles Premier League
- Sierra Leone National Premier League
- Solomon Islands S-League
- South Sudan Premier League
- (Saint Kitts and Nevis) SKNFA Premier League
- Suriname Major League
- (Togo) Togolese Championnat National
- (Trinidad and Tobago) TT Premier Football League
- (Tunisia) Tunisian Women's Championship
- (Turks and Caicos Islands) Provo Premier League
- (United Arab Emirates) UAE First Division League
- (United Arab Emirates) UAE President's Cup
- Uganda Premier League
- (United States) USL Championship
- (United States) USL League One
- (United States) USL League Two
- (Venezuela) Liga FUTVE
- (Venezuela) Liga FUTVE 2

== See also ==
- FIFA (video game series)
- List of association football competitions
- List of men's national association football teams
- List of women's national association football teams
- List of world association football records
- Lists of association football clubs
- FIFA Medical Assessment and Research Centre (1994-2017)
