= 2026 Trump–FIFA red card controversy =

Soccer officiating controversy involving Folarin Balogun

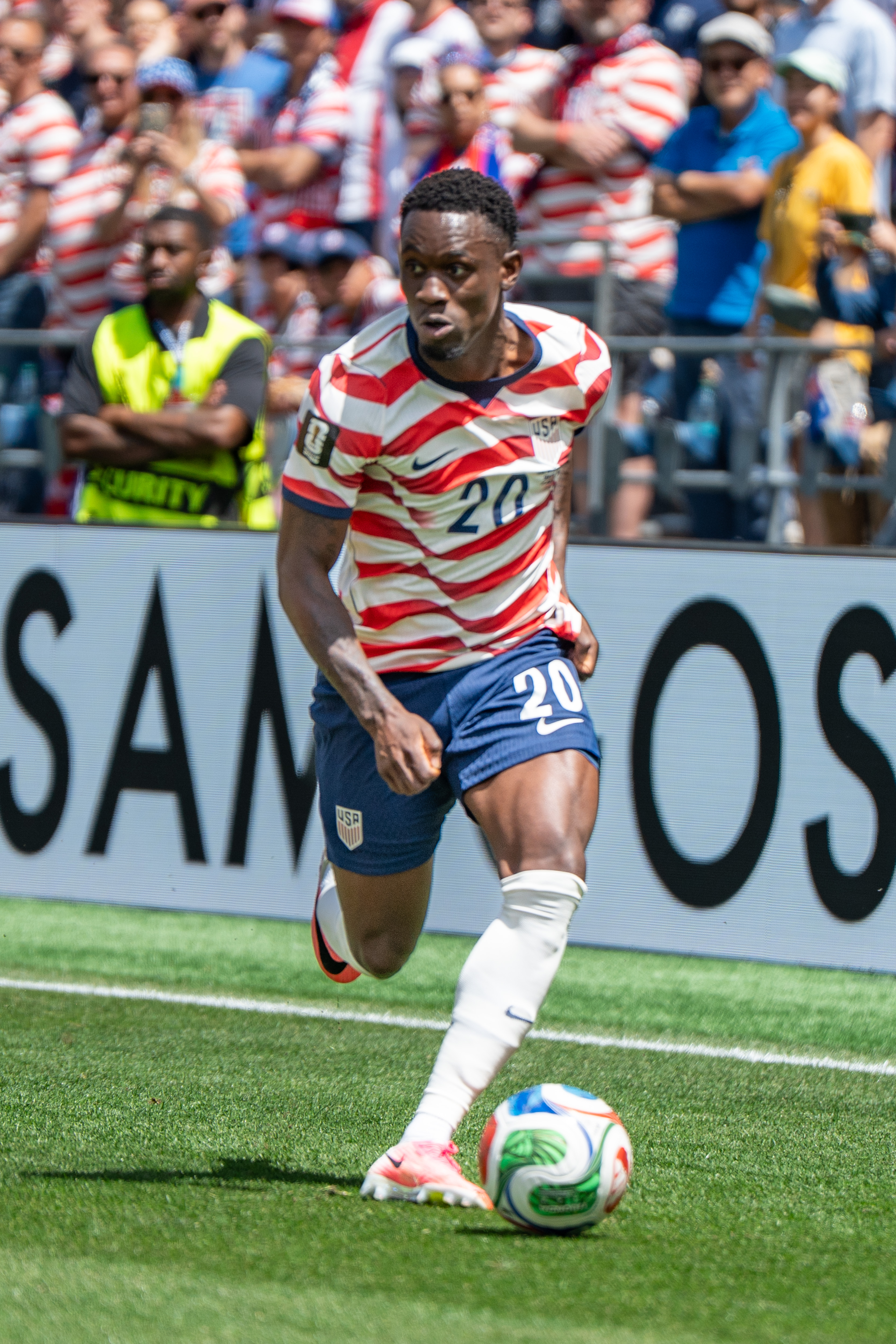
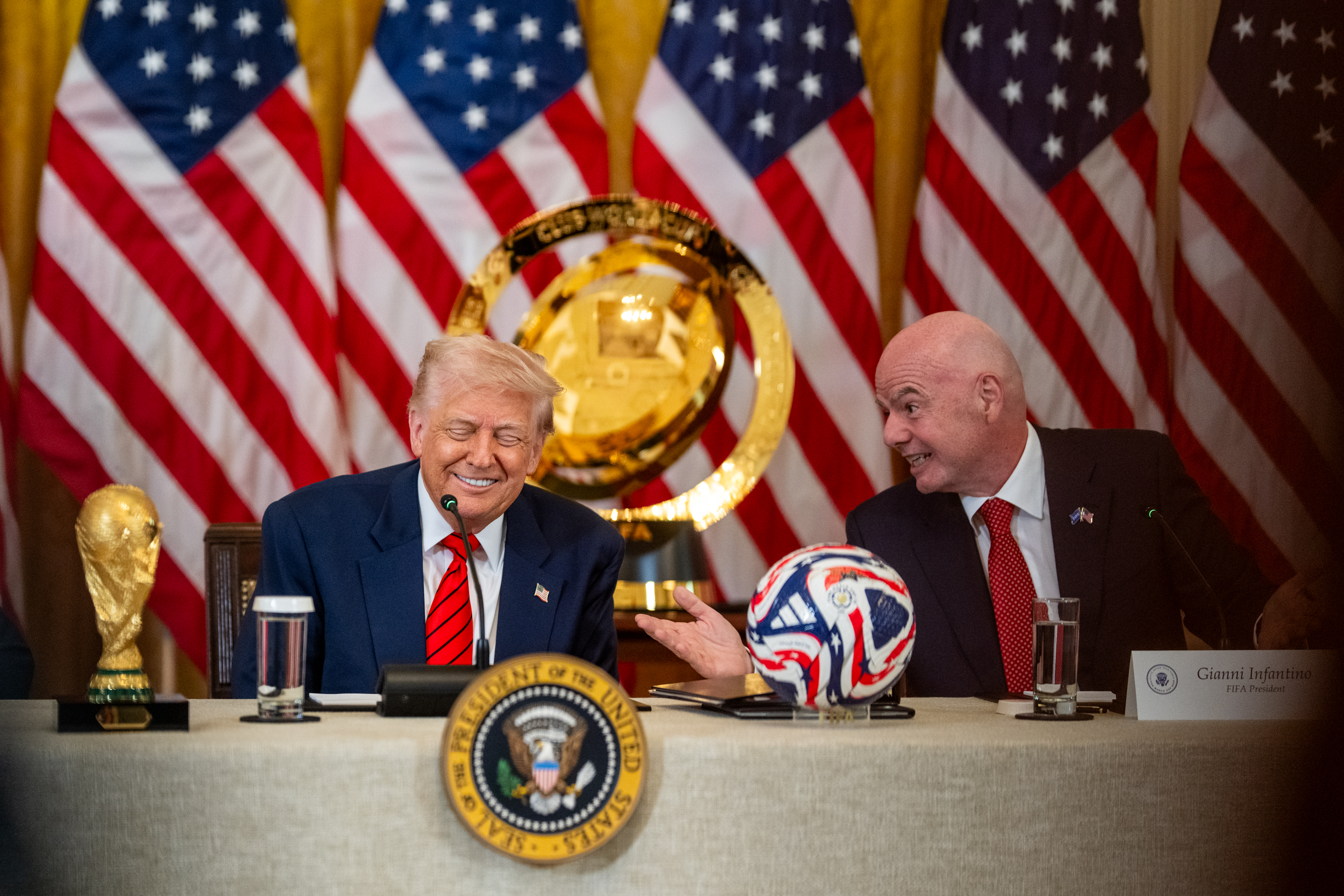
Left to right: Folarin Balogun, Donald Trump, and FIFA president Gianni Infantino

During the 2026 World Cup, FIFA suspended the implementation of a one-game suspension that US national team player Folarin Balogun had received after he was sent off in a round of 32 match victory against the Bosnia and Herzegovina national team for a foul on Tarik Muharemović. Balogun's suspension was delayed for a probationary period of one year under the Article 27 authority of the FIFA Disciplinary Code. United States president Donald Trump had directly called FIFA president Gianni Infantino asking him to review the red card decision. The decision allowed Balogun to participate in the United States' Round of 16 match against Belgium despite the red card remaining in effect. Belgium won the match 4–1, with Balogun playing almost the entire match.

== Background ==
Folarin Balogun entered the 2026 FIFA World Cup as the United States men's national soccer team's starting striker after being named to the nation's 26-player squad. On June 12 in his World Cup debut and the team's opening group stage match against Paraguay, Balogun scored twice in the 4–1 opener, being named Player of the Match. The game marked the first time an American had a multi-goal World Cup match in 96 years, since the 1930 FIFA World Cup in Uruguay, when Bert Patenaude scored the first hat-trick in World Cup history, which had also been against Paraguay. In the following game against Australia, he won a second back-to-back Player of the Match award as the United States secured the top spot in Group D.

== Red card incident ==
Balogun scored the opening goal in the 2–0 win against Bosnia and Herzegovina national football team in the round of 32, matching Landon Donovan for the second-most goals scored by an American in a single FIFA World Cup, with three, trailing only Patenaude's four goals in 1930. However, later in the game, he received a red card. In the 61st minute, Balogun stepped on the ankle of Tarik Muharemović, without injuring him, when the two players were challenging for the ball. The referee Raphael Claus did not call a foul on the field, but the VAR Juan Soto called for an on-field review for a red card. After reviewing the slow motion replays, Claus sent off Balogun for serious foul play. This made Balogun only the fourth World Cup player to both score a goal and receive a red card in the same match, most recently by Zinedine Zidane in 2006, following his headbutt in that final. This initially caused his exclusion from the United States' round of 16 match against Belgium.

== Reactions to red card ==
The decision to award Balogun a red card generated widespread outrage from American fans and led to a media campaign with the slogan "Free Flo". The red card decision was widely considered as excessive compared to similar or worse incidents in the tournament that faced lighter or no punishments, most notably, the comparison of an aggressive foul by Lionel Messi against Algeria that did not result in a red, or even yellow, card, which also led many commentators to criticize the general lack of consistency in punishments within the tournament.

According to two sources heard by the New York Times, U.S. officials including commerce secretary Howard Lutnick and Andrew Giuliani provided lawyers for the United States team to appeal the red card. The sources stated that a US team donor had said that the referee's use of a slow-motion replay made the red card invalid, and that Trump had made the same argument later when talking to Infantino. The Laws of the Game do indeed provide that the on-field referee should use normal speed, not slow motion, to determine the severity of an offence. Additionally, former referee Andy Davies stated that the use of slow motion and still images to make recommendations to the on-field referee relating to the issuance of a red card during the review process constituted a breach of VAR protocols.

The United States Soccer Federation (USSF) planned to argue to the Court of Arbitration for Sport (CAS) that VAR protocols were not followed in issuing Balogun a red card, and notified FIFA of its intention to take such legal action prior to the lifting of the suspension. After Trump expressed doubt about the legitimacy of Claus's red card and professional ethics, the Brazilian Football Confederation expressed support for the referee, who is a member of the organization, and pushed back against any suspicion regarding his professional integrity.

== Suspension of red card ==
Donald Trump on July 6, 2026

Balogun's suspension was later overturned under the Article 27 authority of the FIFA Disciplinary Code. FIFA declined Belgium's appeal to have the effects of Balogun's red card restored, stating that the request was inadmissible. AP News confirmed that president Donald Trump personally called Infantino to review the red card decision. The Guardian reported that Trump made three calls to FIFA lobbying to have the ban lifted. Trump told reporters on July 6 that "All I did, I asked for a review because I didn't think it was a foul". He also said "that wasn't even an infraction." The Times reported on July 12 that Mohammad al-Kamali, chairman of FIFA's disciplinary committee, made the decision to suspend the red card ban independently, without the involvement of the other 17 members of the committee.

=== Legitimacy and precedents ===
FIFA had previously informed The Athletic that national associations could not appeal red cards or the resulting suspensions during the World Cup, prompting suggestions that the disciplinary committee had acted on its own initiative. The FIFA Disciplinary Code states, "Decisions taken by the referee on the field of play are final and may not be reviewed by the FIFA judicial bodies." However, Article 27 of the FIFA Disciplinary Code permits modifications of the consequences of those decisions, including suspensions. It provides FIFA with a wide discretion to fully or partially suspend disciplinary measures. In their appeal, Belgium cited both Article 66.4 and 10.5 of the Regulations for the 2026 FIFA World Cup, which say that if a player or team official is sent off as a result of a direct or indirect red card (second caution), they will automatically be suspended from their team's subsequent match and that additional sanctions may be applied. However, the regulations also include Article 7.1, which states that "disciplinary infringements are dealt with in compliance with the FIFA Disciplinary Code in force as well as with all relevant circulars and directives". This means that the FIFA Disciplinary Code takes precedent over Article 10.5 although Article 66.4 is still subject to Article 27.

Comparisons were made to Cristiano Ronaldo, who received a red card in Portugal's second-last World Cup qualifier against the Republic of Ireland. He received a three-match ban, but after serving his subsequent match ban, the latter two were suspended by FIFA in an unprecedented decision under Article 27, allowing Ronaldo to compete in Portugal's opening two matches of the 2026 World Cup. Article 27 was also used to waive the suspension of Argentina's Nicolás Otamendi and Ecuador's Moisés Caicedo, both of whom received a red card in their country's final World Cup qualifier. This allowed both of them to appear in their country's first match at the World Cup.

The closest precedent to Balogun's case is the dismissal of Brazil's Garrincha during the 1962 FIFA World Cup semi-final. (Note: Physical penalty cards were introduced in football at the 1970 FIFA World Cup so before then, players who were dismissed from the match were verbally done so by the referee) This was the only other time FIFA suspended the next-match ban mid-tournament. However, before 1970, a sending-off by a referee did not automatically result in a one-match ban, as the rule was not yet implemented, so Garrincha's ban would have had to have been issued by a disciplinary committee. The day after the sending-off, the disciplinary committee decided against suspending Garrincha for the final (which Garrincha played in and Brazil won). They were allegedly influenced by intervention from the President of the host nation, Chile, Jorge Alessandri. Out of the other 189 dismissals at the World Cup, only Garrincha had escaped a suspension before Balogun.

=== Reactions ===
==== Political ====
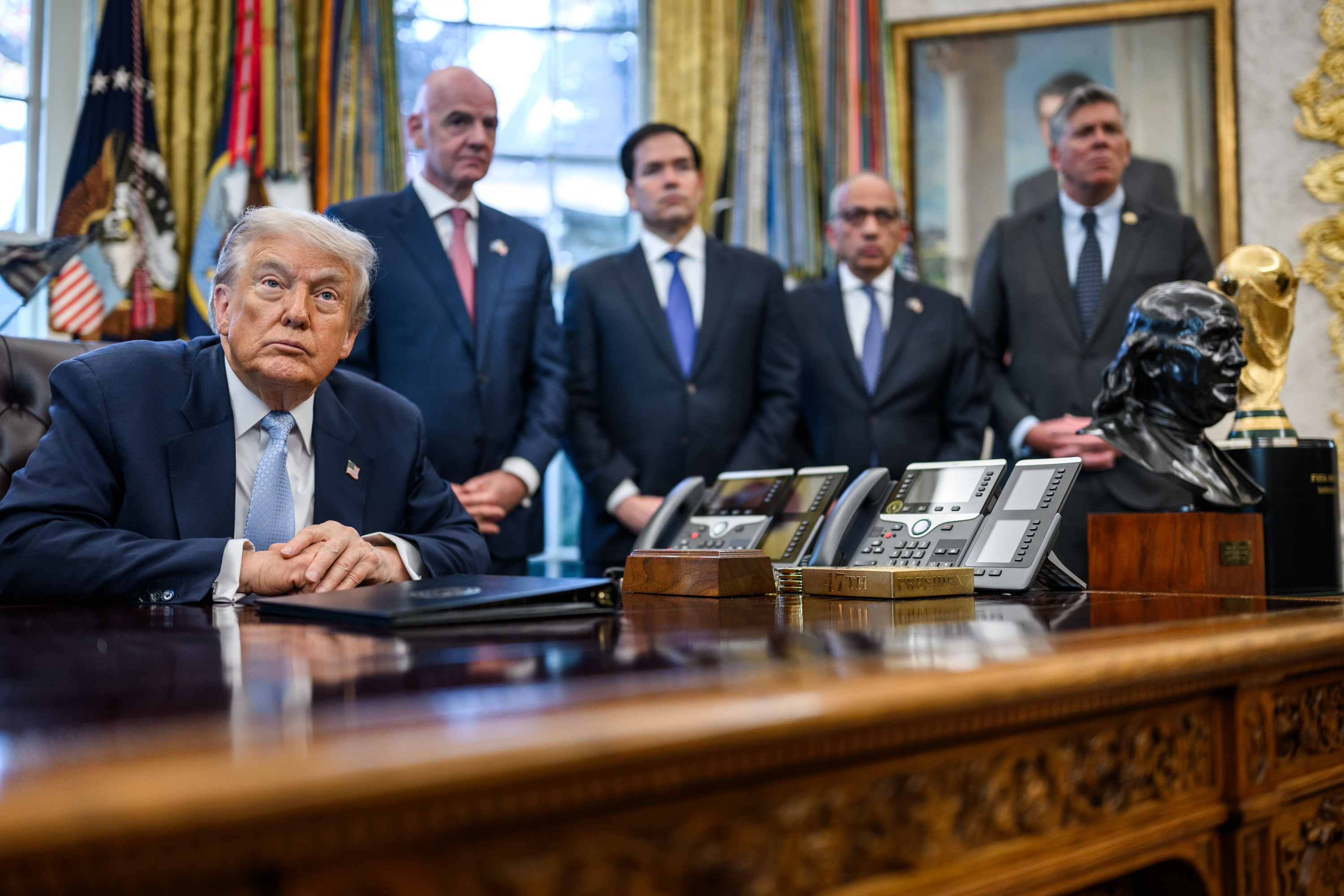
President Donald Trump (left), next to president of FIFA Gianni Infantino, and FIFA advisor Carlos Cordeiro (to the right of Marco Rubio) at the White House in November 2025

Donald Trump welcomed FIFA's decision on Truth Social, writing: "Thank you to FIFA for doing what was right, and reversing a great injustice!". In response to the controversy, Trump said he "didn't think it was a foul" and added that Balogun "didn't do anything wrong". Trump said that "I thought it was two great athletes who crashed into each other and got entangled ... I think it [the suspension] would have left a big stain. I can't tell them what to do. I don't believe they made the decision; I believe it was the commission that made the decision. And it was the right decision." Trump called the referee "a little bit suspect" and said to "check his past". He said that "I didn't know what the hell a red card is, when I found out I said, 'you've got to be kidding'." Weeks later, it was reported that Trump wants Infantino to be the next secretary-general of the United Nations.

United States Secretary of State Marco Rubio praised FIFA's decision, stating that the organization should not perform slow-motion reviews. He joked about bringing up the controversy up "at NATO tomorrow when we're there with the Belgians and everybody else". Ted Cruz, the junior United States Senator from Texas, praised the decision and thanked President Trump for "getting rid" of the red card. Prime Minister of Belgium Bart De Wever mocked FIFA's decision on Instagram, sharing an image of his cat with a speech bubble reading "Red card? I'll play anyway." Belgian Foreign Minister Maxime Prévot criticized FIFA's decision, calling it "incomprehensible". The Belgian Socialist Party condemned the decision, calling it a "deplorable image for FIFA, for the soccer World Cup, and for the United States".

European commissioner Glenn Micallef, called the red card suspension the "wrong decision", and asserted that "decisions on sporting rules and sporting matters belong to sporting bodies, not politicians." Yvan Verougstraete, a member of the European Parliament, responded to the decision, arguing that "FIFA must defend fairness, not give the impression of yielding to political pressures." On July 8, MEPs Barry Andrews, Lara Wolters and Niels Fuglsang called the FIFA decision a "disgrace and a perversion of justice" and asked the European national football associations to ask the FIFA Ethics Committee to investigate Infantino. On the same day, the Associated Press reported that "[d]ozens of European [Union] lawmakers are gathering support to launch an investigation" of Infantino.

==== FIFA current and former officials ====
Infantino said on July 6 that he had talked with Trump about Balogun's red card. He said that "During our conversation, I explained that there was an ongoing legal process involving FIFA's independent judicial bodies and that the case would be decided in due course by the competent bodies ... That is how FIFA's system works, and it is a principle that I will always uphold." He further rejected criticism by reaffirming that FIFA's disciplinary bodies operate independently and autonomously under the FIFA Disciplinary Code, emphasizing that their decisions are based solely on the applicable rules and the facts of each case, and that their independence must be protected from any external political or public influence. FIFA's Appeals Committee rejected Belgium's challenge to Balogun's eligibility for the World Cup round of 16, ruling the Royal Belgian Football Association had no standing to appeal as it was not a party to the original disciplinary proceedings.

The chairperson of the FIFA Disciplinary Committee issued a statement explaining the decision, confirming that the red card shown to Balogun during the match against Bosnia and Herzegovina had not been overturned. FIFA stated that the committee had upheld the automatic one-match suspension resulting from the sending-off, but used Article 27 of the FIFA Disciplinary Code to suspend the implementation of the ban for a one-year probationary period. The suspension would only be enforced if Balogun committed another infringement of a similar nature and gravity during that period. The committee also confirmed that Balogun was fined USD 40,000, with half attributed to the violation concerning player misconduct during the celebration and half to the offence relating to the red-card suspension. The United States Soccer Federation was declared jointly liable for payment of the fine under Article 6.5 of the FIFA Disciplinary Code.

Former FIFA president Sepp Blatter complained on social media that "Red cards are not overturned by political phone calls. They are overturned by rules, evidence and independent bodies". He said that "If a US President intervenes with the FIFA President – and a player is suddenly cleared before a World Cup knockout match – the question is unavoidable: Quo vadis, FIFA? Football must never become a playground for political power".

A week after the tournament's conclusion, Infantino wrote that in a social media post that review of red and yellow cards are "routine and widely accepted in some of the biggest leagues worldwide," a statement that The Times and Associated Press regarded as response to the Balogun decision.

==== National football associations ====
- Belgium: Belgium's national team was set to be the United States' next opponents. The Royal Belgian Football Association (RBFA) issued a statement expressing shock at FIFA's decision to suspend Balogun's automatic one-match ban. They argued the ruling contradicted FIFA Disciplinary Code Article 66.4 and 2026 World Cup Regulation Article 10.5, both of which mandate an automatic suspension for a red card in the next match. The former article states that "a sending-off automatically incurs suspension from the subsequent match". The RBFA said they would review all options to protect fair play and tournament integrity, while coach Rudi Garcia likened the announcement to an April Fools' Day joke. Belgium had also issued an appeal directly to FIFA, which determined it to be "inadmissible" and rejected it, citing RBFA being uninvolved. Regardless, Belgium beat the U.S. 4–1 in the match, both during, and after, which the Belgian players could be seen openly mocking Trump for his role in that political controversy, and after which officials from the RBFA reacted on their official online channels with the message: "Overturn this!" On September 7, the RBFA withdrew its support for Infantino's re-election bid at the upcoming 77th FIFA Congress, scheduled for March 2027 in Rabat, Morocco. The association cited the FIFA Forward Enterprise (FFE) and the handling of Balogun’s red card among its reasons for withholding support.
- England: Speaking in the aftermath of England's contemporaneous 3–2 victory against Mexico, in which English player Jarell Quansah was sent off for an incident similar to that of Balogun's and subsequently banned two games, the England national team head coach Thomas Tuchel said that the ruling on Balogun set a dangerous precedent: "Where to draw the line is the question that I ask. I have no answer to that". He added: "Do we appeal if a yellow card is not a yellow card? Do we think it is not a red card, or who thinks it? Where does this start, and where does this end? It's my question. I don't have an answer."
- Germany: German Football Association president Bernd Neuendorf said that "The impression that there has been active political interference in sport must be dispelled swiftly and conclusively. The integrity of the competition and the credibility of FIFA are at stake."
- Italy: Italian Football Federation president Giovanni Malagò said that "[t]his is objectively a very dangerous precedent, an extremely dangerous political precedent", adding that "when you see a decision like this, the meritocracy that is the foundation of football is lost."
- Norway: Norway national football team manager Ståle Solbakken said that FIFA's suspension of the red card was a "bad decision that will hurt the World Cup. I feel also sorry for the United States, because if they win, that will always hang in the balance for it". On July 23, The Times reported that Lise Klaveness, president of the Norwegian Football Federation, would be submitting a formal complaint to the FIFA ethics committee. In the interview, Klaveness called on Infantino to admit that the decision was an "error."
- Spain: Javier Tebas, president of LALIGA, argued that the case reflected broader governance issues within FIFA and criticized what he described as arbitrary decision-making. Later in July, Tebas claimed that the suspension of the red card was "something of absolute gravity" and suggested that, had Belgium not beaten the United States in round of 16, the ensuing fallout "could have cost Infantino his job."
- Switzerland: The Swiss Football Association published a statement declaring its solidarity with the Royal Belgian Football Association, saying that the decision is incomprehensible and the credibility of the competition depends on the equal application of the laws, and that the principle was clear until this moment. The law is equal for everyone: any player who is sent off is suspended in the coming match. The decision raises ambiguity, especially regarding the authority of refereeing decisions, particularly when the VAR intervenes.
- United States: United States head coach Mauricio Pochettino welcomed FIFA's decision to suspend the ban, saying those who value ethics and integrity "should celebrate" the ruling. With regards to potential political pressure, he said "we shouldn't mix that".

==== International sporting bodies ====
- Europe: The Union of European Football Associations (UEFA) stated that "[w]hen the certainty of rules is no longer guaranteed by its guardians, the integrity of the game is at stake and the credibility of a competition is undermined", further adding that "We express our disbelief at such an unprecedented, incomprehensible and unjustifiable decision." On July 19, UEFA President Aleksander Čeferin boycotted the World Cup final in protest of the decision. Čeferin also invited Somali referee Omar Artan to officiate the 2026 UEFA Super Cup, personally attending the match in what marked his first public appearance since his initial boycott. The appointment, which followed a controversy a month prior when Artan was denied entry to the United States to referee in the World Cup, was widely viewed alongside the red card incident as a direct protest against FIFA's perceived alignment with the U.S. administration and its failure to protect its officials.
- IOC: The International Olympic Committee (IOC) received a request to its Ethics Commission to investigate Infantino, who sits on the IOC. As an IOC member, he swore an oath to uphold political neutrality. The complaint, which was filed by non-governmental organization FairSquare, alleged that he violated these principles. IOC President Kirsty Coventry confirmed that the IOC was monitoring the controversy and that the complaint would be considered once received by the ethics commission. The complaint was formally received the following week. The IOC ethics commission was not able to investigate the complaint due to it being outside the IOC’s legal jurisdiction.

=== Betting market irregularities ===
The Group of Copenhagen, an international advisory body, related this incident with possible betting irregularities. They noted that Polymarket opened a market on the same day of the red card asking whether Balogun would play against Belgium, something that did not happen for any other suspension in the tournament.

== See also ==
- List of 2026 FIFA World Cup controversies
- 1934 FIFA World Cup – Also alleged to have been affected by a host nation's political interference, in this case Fascist Italy
