= List of 2026 FIFA World Cup controversies =

The 2026 FIFA World Cup was accompanied by a number of controversies mostly relating to FIFA ticket pricing, political, logistical, environmental, and human rights issues across its three host nations—the United States, Mexico, and Canada. It has been described as the most controversial World Cup. Many venues were criticized for inadequate public transit access. Mandatory hydration breaks introduced in response to extreme heat concerns became a source of criticism after broadcasters used them to air commercials. Environmental groups projected the expanded 48-team tournament to be among the most carbon-intensive in World Cup history. Additional concerns included labor disputes at SoFi Stadium, security and infrastructure issues in all three host nations, unrest related to drug cartels in Guadalajara, cost overruns in Canadian host cities, and the restriction of the Spanish language at official press conferences, despite Spanish being one of FIFA's seven official languages and the primary language of co-host Mexico.

== Commercial and ticketing controversies ==
=== Ticket prices ===
One of the most prominent disputes was FIFA's use of dynamic pricing for tickets—with tickets to the final at MetLife Stadium listed at up to $11,000—which drew criticism from fans, politicians, and players and prompted investigations by multiple U.S. state attorneys general. In September 2025, FIFA confirmed it would use dynamic pricing for World Cup tickets for the first time, following the practice used in the 2025 FIFA Club World Cup. The use of demand-based pricing drew criticism from some United States lawmakers, who argued that it could reduce affordability for fans. FIFA stated that its variable pricing approach differed from fully dynamic pricing, as adjustments were made based on periodic reviews of demand rather than automatic real-time changes.

Fans and players voiced concerns about high ticket prices, particularly for matches hosted in the United States. FIFA's use of dynamic pricing and their own secondary market were criticized as a deviation from the previous first-come, first-served model. President Donald Trump questioned the fees charged by FIFA and stated that he would not pay a thousand dollars to watch the United States' opening match. New York mayor Zohran Mamdani attempted to combat FIFA's price gouging by campaigning for the organization to end its dynamic pricing model, albeit to no avail. House Democrats also called on FIFA to lower prices, but were ignored by the organization. Also joining the inquiry into the price gouging were the attorneys general of New York (Letitia James), New Jersey (Jennifer Davenport), Texas (Ken Paxton), and California (Rob Bonta).

FIFA was heavily criticized by the media and fans for raising ticket prices for the final match at MetLife Stadium, with a single ticket costing US$11,000. United States midfielder Timothy Weah stated that tickets were "too expensive", criticisms that were dismissed by manager Mauricio Pochettino, causing backlash from American fans. In May 2026, FIFA president Gianni Infantino defended the price of tickets, insisting the organization "had to apply market rates".

The high ticket prices were seen as a possible cause for empty seats seen during multiple matches. While the opening match was played in a full stadium, the second match showed thousands of empty seats, again raising concerns about high ticket prices. In an official statement by FIFA regarding the empty seats, they stated that this was due to "several ticketed fans standing in concourses rather than staying in their assigned seats". This statement drew scrutiny, even more so when thousands of empty seats were visible again during the first match by host nation Canada. Several other reasons were given for the empty seating, including people sheltering from the heat. Many empty hospitality seats were seen during the match between the Netherlands and Japan, which were filled by FIFA volunteers ten minutes into the match after they had been allowed to occupy the seats.

=== Final match halftime show ===
FIFA announced that there would be a halftime show for the World Cup final, similar to the NFL's Super Bowl halftime show. It was the first halftime show in the history of the FIFA World Cup. This was criticized as an Americanization and commercialization of the sport, and for going against general IFAB protocol, which in the codified Laws of the Game stated that the halftime could not exceed 15 minutes.

=== Bottle bans ===
FIFA initially announced a ban on reusable water bottles inside all stadiums during the 2026 World Cup, stating that the bottles posed a safety hazard as they could be thrown and cause injuries. The decision was widely criticized, as most games would be played during the hottest hours of the day, raising concerns about hydration, spectator welfare, and environmental impact. FIFA responded that it would provide hydration stations, cooling areas, and other measures. Later, FIFA stated that spectators in the United States and Canada could bring factory-sealed plastic water bottles into stadiums.

== Climate and environmental impact ==
=== Climate ===
In January 2025, Queen's University Belfast warned about potential heat risks for most of the host cities and urged FIFA to schedule match kickoffs later into the afternoon or evening, stating that the wet-bulb globe temperature in certain host cities was higher than that of Qatar in the winter. During the 2025 FIFA Club World Cup, which was also hosted in the United States, several matches reported high temperatures ranging from 90 to 102 °F (32 to 39 °C) and weather delays. On May 20, 2026, a letter from the New Weather Institute signed by dozens of players called for FIFA to take stronger action on heat protocols during the tournament, as well as to reduce the climate impact of the game.

==== Hydration breaks ====
In December 2025, FIFA announced that all matches at the 2026 World Cup would include a mandatory three-minute hydration break in each half to allow players to rest in hot conditions. Despite the reported initial motivation behind the break as the players' welfare, many media sources largely interpreted the break to provide a period of tactical instruction midway through the half. Momentum appeared to shift significantly after the break, and, in the first matchday, there were a total of 170 shots between the hydration break and halftime, compared to just 115 shots from the start of matches to the hydration break. In addition, the breaks came under criticism, particularly when being implemented in all stadiums, including the air-conditioned ones. During the group stage match between Ghana and Panama in Toronto, supporters began booing the hydration break as it took place despite heavy rain; a large portion of these breaks across the tournament went on to be booed by spectators in attendance.

The three-minute period would also be available for commercials at the discretion of tournament broadcasters. During the tournament, several broadcasters used the break to air commercials, although FIFA requested that broadcasters return to the match 30 seconds before play resumed. This sparked criticism from fans, who argued that it disrupted the pace of play and allowed broadcasters to extract added advertising revenue. Some fans reported missing the resumption of play after broadcasters failed to return from commercials before play resumed.

During hydration breaks, commercials made by U.S. English-language broadcaster Fox Network (which also included FS1 and FS2) were the subject of scrutiny by viewers who were watching the matches at home, and viewers harshly criticized the network for lengthy commercial breaks that had drawn out before the match had resumed (although multiple international broadcasters also inserted ads into those breaks). U.S. Spanish-language broadcaster Telemundo, on the other hand, never showed commercials during those breaks, with its announcers actively mentioning so during each. In addition, Telemundo's coverage was streamed on the cheaper Peacock service at a $10.99 per month subscription versus Fox's coverage streamed on Fox One at $19.99 per month. It was thus reported that at least 20 percent of Telemundo's viewers stated that English was their primary language instead of Spanish, leading to "tensions" between Fox/FS1/FS2/Fox One's parent company the Fox Corporation, and Telemundo/Peacock's parent company NBCUniversal. As a result, FIFA bundled the U.S. English and Spanish rights together for the next World Cups to increase their bids.

==== Air quality during the final ====
Prior to the final, there were concerns that smoke from the 2026 Canadian wildfires would affect the air quality of the final and impact player performance. Spain decided to practice under the smoke, while Argentina practiced in Atlanta to avoid the smoke. FIFA president Gianni Infantino met with US president Donald Trump and World Cup Task Force leader Andrew Giuliani to discuss the wildfires. At the time, New York and New Jersey were under air quality alerts, and air quality readings in New York City were deemed "very unhealthy" and well beyond levels deemed dangerous to the general public. But the day prior to the final, due to heavy thunderstorms passing through the venue for the final, the amount of smoke became light, and the air quality improved to the point where there was no risk to the general public.

=== Environmental impact ===
The tournament's environmental impact also drew significant criticism. Concerns were raised by climate activists about the environmental impact of expansion to 48 teams and the large distances between venues. A report by Scientists for Global Responsibility calculated that the tournament's greenhouse gas emissions would make it one of the most polluting events in the world, as it would be almost double the average for the last four tournaments. This was seen to contradict FIFA's sustainability goals.

An independent study by carbon accounting firm Greenly estimated the event's total carbon footprint as equivalent to 7.8 million metric tons of CO₂, more than double the official emissions reported for the 2022 World Cup in Qatar. While utilizing existing stadiums limited infrastructure emissions to just 3% of the total, the vast geographical distribution of matches across three North American countries and the expansion to 48 teams caused spectator and team transit to account for 87.8% of the tournament's overall carbon footprint. Critics also questioned FIFA's sustainability commitments, citing its sponsorship agreement with Saudi oil company Aramco. Additional scrutiny was directed at the United States' withdrawal from the Paris Agreement under the second Trump administration in 2026, which was seen as going against the environmental commitments linked with hosting and highlighting FIFA's lack of enforcement on climate standards.

== Infrastructure, transit, and host-city logistics ==
=== Decentralized host committees in the United States ===
Unlike previous World Cups, where there was a centralized organizing committee, each of the eleven U.S. host cities largely followed a decentralized American sports model, setting up its own host committee, with independent deals with FIFA. As a result, most of the financial and legal responsibilities shifted from the national level to the local level, including the majority of those for infrastructure improvements, public safety and security, and transportation.

In February 2026, the Select Board of Foxborough refused to grant the entertainment license to hold matches at Gillette Stadium, stating that it still needed $7.8 million upfront in security funding—too heavy a burden for a community of about 18,000 people to pay upfront and wait to be reimbursed later. While the federal government had earmarked a total of $625 million for security across the eleven U.S. host cities, it remained unclear how much Foxborough's share would be and when it would arrive. In addition, while the local Boston host committee was responsible for most public safety costs, it was still awaiting federal grant funding. The town board had set a deadline of March 17 to resolve the funding issue, which was met when Robert Kraft agreed five days before the deadline that his company would pay the bill. Various cities also had issues planning the FIFA Fan Festival, resulting in large central fan festivals—typically a feature of the tournament—either being canceled and replaced with smaller, community-focused festivals, or scaled down due to high costs in New York/New Jersey, the San Francisco Bay Area, and Seattle.

=== Stadium access ===
Many U.S. venues lacked public transit rail access, instead being serviced primarily or exclusively by private car-dependent infrastructure that the American Society of Civil Engineers rated deficient. Visitors to the United States instead considered walking to venues such as MetLife Stadium along the shoulder of Interstate 95. This would be difficult due to the closure of some pedestrian crossings for the event. Additionally, local officials chastised anyone attempting to walk to the venue and blamed them for endangering motorists and police officers. The New York Times found that some Americans dismissed the calls for public transit and walkability as Europeanism.

MetLife Stadium, located in East Rutherford, New Jersey, is part of the New York Metropolitan area, but not located in New York City proper. The location of the stadium was the subject of criticism due to the slow pace of transporting spectators to and from the stadium. Three hours after the Brazil vs Morocco group stage match, spectators were still stuck at MetLife Stadium, with New Jersey Transit struggling to move spectators. These challenges occurred despite less than expected demand for taking the train to the stadium.

The U.S. Federal Transit Administration made $100 million in grants available to transit agencies in host cities for the tournament to offset the cost of running specialized service, including express routes to stadiums. The regular fare of US$12.90 for a New Jersey Transit rail trip to MetLife Stadium was raised to US$150 to cover additional operating costs; it was then reduced to US$98 after public backlash. Other cities, such as Atlanta, Houston, and Seattle, charged normal fares for their transit to stadiums despite introducing special service. A study of Arrowhead Stadium in Kansas City, which had no rail access, found that the nominal 32-minute travel time by private car from the airport was expected to balloon to 136 minutes due to traffic. To meet FIFA's contractual obligations, Kansas City bolstered its municipal bus service, but intended to cut it back once the World Cup ended.

Urban planner Ray Delahanty ranked the venues on their transit access and proximity to urban cores, noting that World Cup fans were "people who are, for the most part, used to being able to walk, bike, or take transit to a stadium that is close to the heart of their city". His tier list ranked Vancouver and Seattle most highly (S-tier); followed by Atlanta (A-tier); Toronto, Philadelphia, and Mexico City (B-tier); Houston (C-tier); Monterrey and San Francisco (D-tier); Los Angeles, Kansas City, Guadalajara, and Dallas (E-tier); and Miami, Boston (where the local MBTA raised its round trip fares to $80), and New Jersey (F-tier).

=== Cost overruns (Canada) ===
In the host cities of Toronto and Vancouver, residents expressed concern that the costs of hosting the FIFA World Cup, which were around $1 billion, were not worth it, citing concerns over disruptions, street closures, security perimeters, tax breaks for FIFA, and the cancellation or rescheduling of summer events. In addition, past guarantees to keep costs down were not held, with costs increasing by double or triple the initial estimate in the eight years since the bid was announced in 2018, with much of the funding coming from government sources.

=== Host city demands (Canada) ===
Montreal, the second-largest city in Canada, had initially been considered to host World Cup games after Vancouver dropped out due to cost concerns; however, officials in Montreal stated that FIFA's demands were too restrictive and opted out in 2021, as complying would have forced the cancellation of events such as the Canadian Grand Prix, the Montreal International Jazz Festival, the Montreal Triathlon, and Les Francos de Montréal, on top of the stadium and field demands.

=== Infrastructure projects (Mexico) ===
Multiple projects, including the construction and renovation of airports, stadiums, and railways, were affected by delays in planning and execution. Three days after President Claudia Sheinbaum inaugurated the renovations at Mexico City International Airport, part of a bridge collapsed onto a vehicle, injuring the driver. Line 2 of the Mexico City Metro, which connected to the Mexico City Light Rail serving Estadio Azteca, had multiple stations closed for renovation work in June. Head of Government of Mexico City Clara Brugada said the delay was caused by the late disbursement of funds. In Monterrey, multiple highways and metro stations were reported incomplete as of June 1, 2026. Renovation work was still underway outside Monterrey International Airport, while construction of Lines 4 and 6 was also ongoing. In Guadalajara, the planned Line 5 of the Urban Electric Train System was replaced by a bus rapid transit line operated by Mi Macro.

== Immigration and visa issues ==
As in earlier World Cups hosted by Russia and Qatar, the host countries' immigration policies drew criticism. A U.S. travel ban covering 39 countries, including qualified teams Haiti, Iran, Ivory Coast and Senegal, kept most ordinary fans from those countries from getting visas. It exempted athletes, coaches and support staff, as well as dual nationals, permanent residents and existing visa holders. A separate visa bond program initially required fans from five African qualifiers to pay deposits of up to $15,000. The requirement was suspended in May 2026 for fans with tickets.

Several players and officials had problems at the border. Iraqi striker Aymen Hussein was questioned for seven hours at O'Hare International Airport, and Somali referee Omar Artan was refused entry at Miami International Airport and sent back to Istanbul. Members of Iran's coaching and administrative staff were denied U.S. visas, which Iranian officials called discriminatory. In Canada, Ghana's Thomas Partey was refused a visa, reportedly because of criminal charges against him in the United Kingdom, and missed the team's opening match. CTV News reported that Canada rejected more than half of all World Cup visitor applications, including almost 90% of those from Ghanaian fans.

There were also concerns about immigration enforcement in host cities. ICE had issued no guidance barring arrests at stadiums, and Homeland Security Secretary Markwayne Mullin said customs officials could stop processing international travelers at airports in sanctuary cities, a plan that airlines warned would hurt the industry.

== Boycott threats ==
There were various calls to boycott the 2026 World Cup, largely as a consequence of U.S. immigration policy under the second presidency of Donald Trump. CNN reported Trump's travel ban on 39 countries, which it described as "mostly non-White, African or Muslim-majority countries." An online boycott petition in the Netherlands gathered 174,000 signatures. Former FIFA president Sepp Blatter also endorsed a fan-led boycott movement.

Following U.S. assertions regarding Greenland in January 2026, European political and sporting figures discussed a potential boycott of the 2026 FIFA World Cup, with calls for action emerging from the United Kingdom, Germany, and the Netherlands. While major governing bodies remained cautious, the debate highlighted growing friction between FIFA—headed by Gianni Infantino, who presented a "FIFA Peace Prize" to United States president Donald Trump in December 2025—and European football associations, with some figures drawing parallels to the exclusion of Russia from international competitions in 2022.

== Iran's participation ==
On November 27, 2025, the Football Federation Islamic Republic of Iran (FFIRI) said it would boycott the December 5 World Cup draw after its president, Mehdi Taj, was denied a visa to enter the United States. Four other delegation members, including head coach Amir Ghalenoei, were approved. An FFIRI spokesperson told state media the United States' decision was "unrelated to sport" and said the federation quickly raised the issue with FIFA president Gianni Infantino. However, on December 3, the FFIRI reversed its decision and announced that it would send representatives to the draw, with head coach Ghalenoei serving as the national team's technical representative.

FIFA had long promoted the World Cup under the slogan "Football Unites the World," presenting it as a symbol of global connection and harmony. However, several reports suggested that the 2026 edition was taking place in a more complex context, with political tensions—including those involving Iran and the United States—as well as security concerns and immigration and visa policies in the U.S., potentially making participation in the tournament more difficult. Some analysts also described the tournament as facing a mix of political, security, and logistical challenges at the same time. Commentators argued that while FIFA continued to emphasize messages of unity, these conditions could undermine that narrative by highlighting divisions and unequal access for fans from different parts of the world.

=== Protests against the Iran national team ===
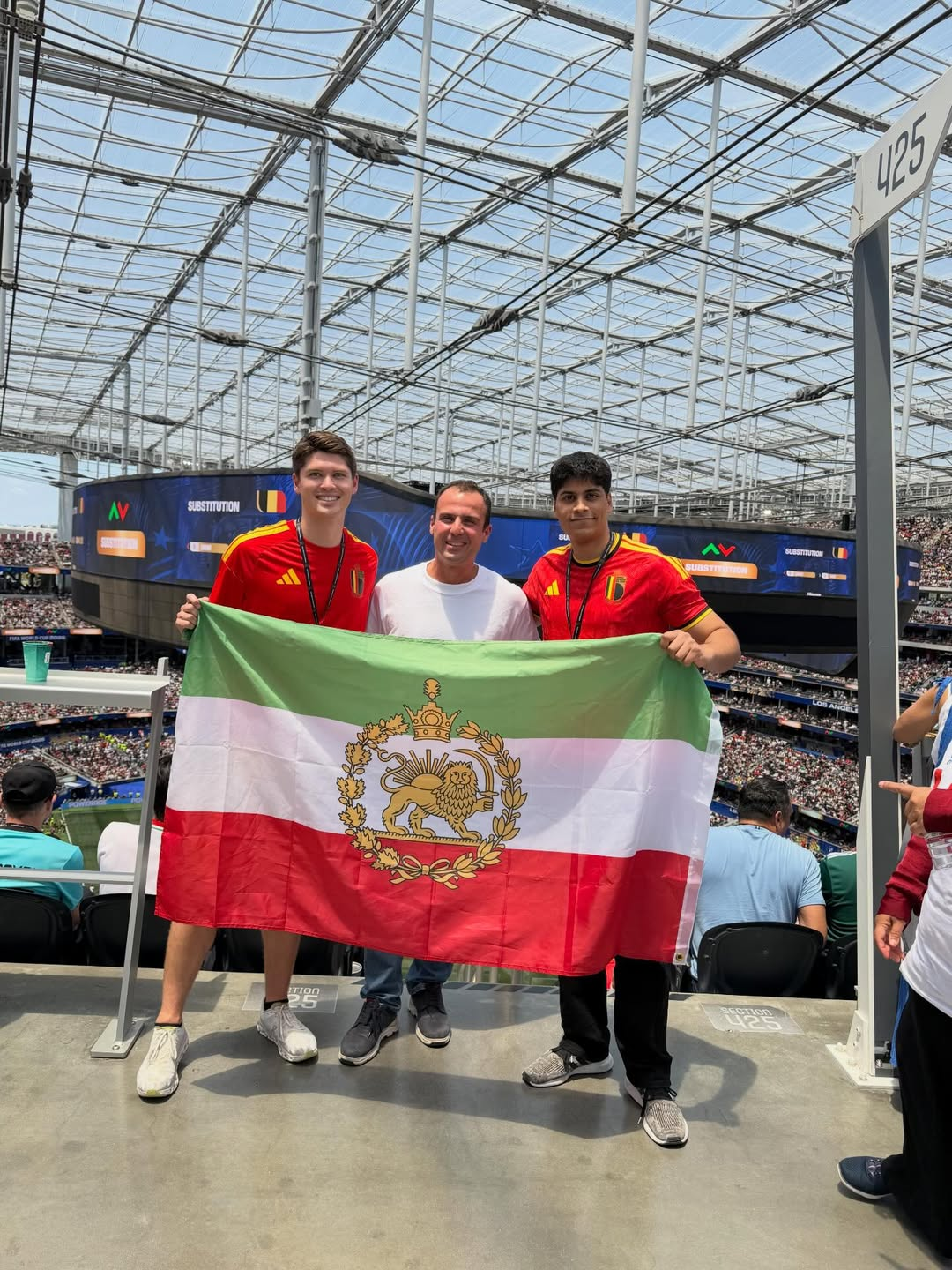
Fans with the Lion and Sun flag prior to the Iran vs. Belgium 2026 FIFA World Cup match at SoFi Stadium in Los Angeles

On April 30, 2026, members of the Iranian opposition held protests outside the 2026 FIFA Congress in Vancouver, stating that the team represented the Islamic Revolutionary Guard Corps (IRGC) instead of the people of Iran. On May 19, it was reported that FIFA would again ban the Iranian Lion and Sun flag from World Cup stadiums, similar to previous World Cups. On May 26, FIFA faced the threat of legal action from The Institute for Voices of Liberty over its ban of the Lion and Sun flag. On June 10, Iran's sports minister Ahmad Donyamali stated that the team may pull out of matches if "unofficial flags" or "chants against the national team" were present inside stadiums during matches involving the country.

Despite this, several hundred Iranian-Americans brought Lion and Sun flags before the match in defiance of the rules and booed the current anthem, with many of them being members of Los Angeles's Iranian community, who were known for opposing the current government. Some Iranian protesters supported the New Zealand team against Iran and also waved Israeli flags and chanted slogans in favor of Reza Pahlavi, the eldest son of the last Shah of Iran Mohammad Reza Pahlavi. Similar clashes occurred during the match against Belgium, where protesters scuffled with fans carrying the current flag of Iran; however, security had been increased ahead of the game. During Iran's final group match against Egypt in Seattle, protesters showed up outside of the stadium carrying the Lion and Sun flag.

=== Iran war impact ===
Further complications regarding Iran's participation occurred as a result of the 2026 Iran–United States crisis in February 2026, which resulted in the United States and Israel launching a war against Iran. In retaliation, Iran launched missiles and drones at Israel, American-aligned Arab countries, and U.S. bases. FIFA stated that it was monitoring the situation and was focused on getting all countries to participate, despite reports suggesting Iran might not take part. According to The Guardian, if Iran were to withdraw, either intercontinental playoff participant Iraq or the United Arab Emirates, the last Asian Football Confederation team eliminated from the qualifiers, could be likely beneficiaries, replacing Iran in Group G. FIFA warned that Iran could face fines and a ban from future competitions should it withdraw from the tournament. However, on March 10, Iran hinted that it might do so due to the risk of defections by players, similar to the women's team during the 2026 AFC Women's Asian Cup in Australia. Following a meeting with U.S. president Trump on March 10, Infantino said that Trump had reiterated that the Iranian team "is, of course, welcome to compete in the tournament in the United States". In a post on Truth Social, Trump later added that, while the team was welcome, he did not believe it would be "appropriate that they be there, for their own life and safety". In response, Iran asked FIFA to remove the United States as tournament host, referring to Trump's statement that the Iranian team's safety could not be guaranteed.

On March 11, Iran's Minister of Sport and Youth, Ahmad Donyamali, reportedly ruled out participation in the World Cup in an interview with Deutsche Presse-Agentur, citing the assassination of Ali Khamenei, and later told Iranian state television that "under no circumstances can we participate in the World Cup". On March 17, it was reported that FFIRI was negotiating with FIFA to move Iran's scheduled matches from the United States to Mexico, again citing Trump's statement that the Iranian team's safety could not be guaranteed. However, FIFA denied Iran's request to move its matches and said the schedule would go ahead as planned. That same day, the Asian Football Confederation (AFC) stated that it had not received any formal notification from Iran regarding an intention to withdraw from the tournament. Speaking to reporters at AFC headquarters in Kuala Lumpur, General Secretary Windsor John said that the final decision rested with FFIRI, adding that "the federation has informed us that they are going to the World Cup." He also expressed hope that Iran would resolve its internal issues and participate, noting that the team was among the first Asian teams to secure qualification, having done so in March 2025.

On March 27, ahead of a scheduled AFC Champions League Elite match, state media reported that Iran's Ministry of Sport and Youth had banned its sports teams from traveling to countries it considers "hostile", but it did not explicitly mention the World Cup. In April 2026, Trump envoy suggested that Italy should take Iran's spot in the World Cup, according to the Financial Times. However, FIFA president Infantino confirmed Iran's participation, stating: "The Iranian team is coming, for sure." In May 2026, Iran announced its demands for attending the World Cup, which included visa guarantees for players, staff, journalists, and fans without further questioning by immigration authorities, security guarantees for players and staff, and "respectful" treatment of the Iranian flag, symbols, and national anthem. Requests were also made for any press conference featuring the Iranian team to exclude questions unrelated to the game.

On May 16, 2026, FIFA Secretary-General Mattias Grafström met with Iranian Football Federation officials in Istanbul to offer reassurance over Iran's participation in the World Cup, following concerns about the team's ability to enter the United States due to the war with Iran. Earlier, Iranian FA president Mehdi Taj had been refused entry to Canada for the FIFA Congress due to his links to the Islamic Revolutionary Guard Corps (IRGC), which the U.S. and Canada classified as a terrorist entity. FIFA confirmed it was working with relevant authorities to ensure all teams could compete in a safe environment without discrimination. On May 19, the Iran national team reached Istanbul to start its training camp for the World Cup. It was later confirmed that Iran would play a friendly in Turkey against the Gambia before the start of the tournament. The Iranian Football Federation later announced that the national team's training camp for the World Cup had been moved from the United States (in Tucson, Arizona) to Tijuana, Mexico, due to security concerns, which received official approval from FIFA. Iran's team received visas to enter the United States just ten days before its opening match against New Zealand, while some members of its coaching and administrative staff had not received visas, according to the Fars News Agency. The U.S. State Department considered these individuals to be linked to Iran's Islamic Revolutionary Guard Corps. Later, the Football Federation of Iran announced that its ticket allocation for the tournament had been revoked just days before the start, leaving fans who had already finalized their travel arrangements unable to attend their team's matches.

==== Incidents during the tournament ====
When the team arrived, players wore pins with the number 168, representing the number of victims killed in the 2026 Minab school attack. Iranian players including Mehdi Taremi and Alireza Jahanbakhsh also expressed concerns over visa delays and restrictions, stating that the United States entry policies created additional uncertainty and logistical difficulties for the team ahead of the tournament. Celebrations by members of the Iran national team during their 2–2 draw against the New Zealand national team in Los Angeles generated controversy. After scoring Iran's second goal, midfielder Mohammad Mohebi performed a gesture simulating the firing of guns, which many observers on social media interpreted as a political message amid the ongoing war involving Iran and the United States. Mohebi later stated that the celebration had been spontaneous and was intended only for the fans. In the same match, teammate Ramin Rezaeian made a separate gesture that he acknowledged carried a political meaning, although he declined to elaborate further. The celebrations sparked widespread debate online and prompted criticism from some commentators and supporters.

Following that match, Iran was reportedly ordered by U.S. officials to return to their training camp in Tijuana immediately, rather than the following day as was previously planned, amidst political protests outside the stadium. The single-entry visa of winger Mahdi Torabi, an unused substitute in the match, was expired immediately after he left the United States for Tijuana. The FFIRI later negotiated with FIFA and a multi-entry visa for Torabi was reissued for Iran's next match against Belgium. Later, the FFIRI lodged an official complaint to FIFA for travel restrictions on team members. Following the conclusion of their second match against Belgium, Iran's delegation left a handwritten note in the dressing room at SoFi Stadium in Los Angeles which referenced "peace" and expressed gratitude for the host city. The message stated that the team had competed "with honor" and would leave "with dignity," while also wishing that "peace, respect, and friendship prevail among all nations."

On June 23, the U.S. Department of Homeland Security announced that it would ease travel restrictions for Iran's national team during the World Cup, allowing them to enter the United States two days before their scheduled match against Egypt in Seattle instead of the previously stricter timeline. The policy came a week after signing the Islamabad Memorandum to end the Iran war. Following Iran's third group-stage match, team captain Mehdi Taremi criticized FIFA for what he called a "disaster" tournament, saying the organization had failed to fix serious off-pitch problems such as constant travel between the United States and Mexico, lack of proper recovery time, and missing staff due to visa issues. Upon Iran's elimination from the World Cup, the Homeland Security Secretary Markwayne Mullin said he was very happy that the team had been knocked out and that their visas had been revoked, adding that he was glad they were no longer on U.S. soil and that he may have even sung a song or done a "happy dance" in celebration.

=== Impact on Iraq ===
The war also significantly impacted Iraq's logistical preparations for the intercontinental playoffs, in which the team needed to win just one match to qualify for the World Cup. Following the closure of Iraqi airspace and the suspension of international flights, the Mexican Secretariat of Foreign Affairs intervened to grant entry visas for the national team through diplomatic channels in Saudi Arabia and Qatar, since Mexico does not have an embassy in Iraq. However, despite the issuance of visas, over 60% of the domestic-based squad remained stranded in Baghdad, and a scheduled training camp in Houston before the playoffs was canceled. Head coach Graham Arnold was forced to manage team operations remotely from the United Arab Emirates, as the delegation was unable to secure safe passage out of the conflict zone during the initial weeks of the war.

The Iraq Football Association (IFA) formally petitioned FIFA to postpone the playoff match, citing the impossibility of safe transit for the players and staff. FIFA denied the request, citing the rigidity of the FIFA International Match Calendar, and instead proposed an alternative overland route through Turkey to Istanbul. This proposal was rejected by the IFA and Arnold due to security concerns regarding repeated Iranian strikes in the Kurdistan region. Amid these travel complications, the Mexican government maintained its commitment to the team's participation, working directly with the Iraqi Embassy in Mexico to finalize all documentation. On March 16, it was confirmed that FIFA would provide a chartered private jet to transport the Iraqi team to Mexico. The original plan was for the team to fly on March 20 from Arar Domestic Airport in Saudi Arabia, near the Iraqi border, and arrive in Monterrey the next day, 10 days before the match. However, further airspace closures in the area forced the players and staff based in Iraq to travel overland to Jordan, where they departed on a charter flight from Queen Alia International Airport in Amman on March 21. After a technical layover in Lisbon, they arrived in Monterrey minutes after midnight. On March 31, Iraq qualified for the World Cup after a 40-year absence by beating Bolivia 2–1 in the intercontinental playoff final. This marked the longest qualifying campaign ever by a national team, spanning 21 matches over 28 months beginning in November 2023.

== Human rights and labor concerns ==
=== Mexico ===
==== Labor rights ====
In March 2025, the trade union Building and Wood Workers' International (BWI) accused FIFA of blocking a planned labor inspection at Mexico City's Estadio Azteca, which was undergoing renovations in preparation for the 2026 FIFA World Cup. According to BWI, FIFA's intervention prevented inspectors from evaluating working conditions at the site, raising concerns about potential labor rights violations similar to alleged instances of forced labor at the 2022 World Cup in Qatar. The Italian newspaper L'Espresso reported that Haitian and Venezuelan migrants were hired through subcontractors and were therefore not properly registered, which could result in their lacking social security coverage and other labor rights.

==== Unrest in Jalisco ====
Following the capture and death of Jalisco New Generation Cartel (CJNG) leader Nemesio "El Mencho" Oseguera Cervantes in Tapalpa on February 22, 2026, retaliatory violence was launched by CJNG members across the state of Jalisco and various other Mexican states, involving shootouts, explosions, and the blocking of roads with burned-out vehicles, as well as arson attacks on various businesses, raising concerns about security during matches played in Guadalajara, Jalisco's largest city. Despite this, FIFA officials stated they had no intention of moving any matches, and the Mexican government reassured visitors that their security would be guaranteed. In March 2026, Mexico announced that 100,000 troops would be deployed for security during the tournament. The matches took place as scheduled with no reported altercations with CJNG members.

==== Social protests ====
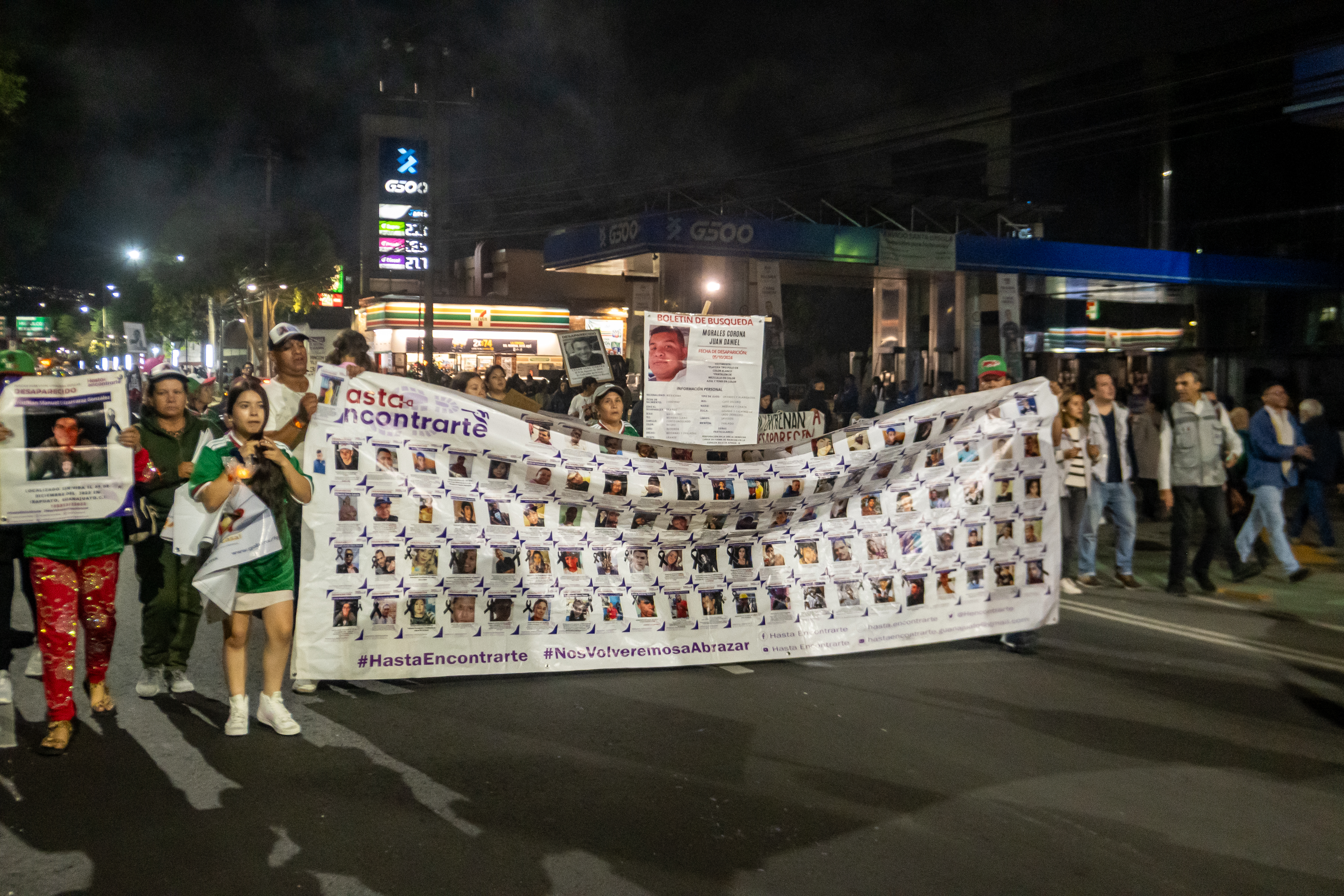
Groups of madres buscadoras protesting the day before the opening match over the thousands of missing-person cases in Mexico

In Mexico City, before the inauguration match was scheduled to take place on June 11 at Estadio Azteca, several groups demonstrated in the city, including the National Educational Workers Coordination (CNTE), demanding that President Sheinbaum fulfill her campaign promise to reverse a 2007 pension and social security reform that they believed had adversely affected them. They also vandalized World Cup-related decorations and announced that they would protest during the opening match. In the days that followed, other groups joined the protests held on the day of the opening match, including the Searching Mothers, retired Pemex and CFE employees, transport workers, farmers, healthcare workers, and groups protesting the gentrification of the city. The city government further restricted access to the Zócalo, the city's main square, to prevent educational workers from entering it and disrupting the FIFA Fan Festival. Days later, the government dispersed a demonstration attempting to access the square with tear gas.

==== Concealment of poverty ====
In the state of Nuevo León, neighborhoods with impoverished homes were covered with billboards. Governor Samuel García said he was already in "party mode" and would not address any problems or complaints during the World Cup.

==== Training base issues ====
On the eve of the 2026 World Cup, Japan established a training base in Monterrey, Mexico, to acclimate to local weather conditions and conduct initial preparations. The team initially planned to hold its training sessions at the practice facility of Tigres UANL. However, due to the poor quality of the grass, the unevenness of the playing surface, and concerns about an increased risk of injury to players, the technical staff ultimately decided to change the training venue.

==== Legal disputes at the Mexico City stadium ====
Following FIFA's requirement for total control over stadiums at host venues as part of its "clean venue" policy, Estadio Azteca was the source of disputes between the stadium's owner, Grupo Ollamani, and the owners of the stadium's luxury suites. When the stadium was built in the 1960s, the luxury suite owners obtained not only their spots but also rights and benefits, such as the ability to bring in food and beverages and to use parking for any event held there over a 99-year period. However, both Grupo Ollamani and FIFA denied the suite owners the right to obtain tickets at no cost, an issue that cost the group $62.4 million to guarantee access for the box seat owners. In addition, the legal case remained unresolved, as FIFA successfully sued the box owners to prevent them from bringing in food and beverages and using the parking lot.

==== Anti-doping controversy ====
Routine anti-doping tests detected traces of the banned substance clenbuterol in samples from eight members of the Tunisia national team. Following an investigation, authorities concluded that the positive tests were most likely the result of contaminated food consumed at the team's training base in Mexico rather than intentional doping, and no players were sanctioned.

=== United States ===
==== Training base issues ====
Switzerland warned players and staff about the presence of rattlesnakes around its training base at the San Diego Jewish Academy in San Diego, marking nearby areas as a "snake area" and advising caution during training sessions. Days before the tournament began, nine people sustained non-life-threatening injuries in a shooting near England's World Cup base camp in Kansas City, Missouri. The incident occurred several miles from the team's designated training facility, Swope Soccer Village, while the England squad was training in Florida and had not yet arrived at its tournament base. Moreover, German midfielder Joshua Kimmich said players had encountered a venomous snake near Germany's training base in Winston-Salem, North Carolina, and had been warned that a bite would require hospital treatment.

==== Excessive security checks ====
On June 9, 2026, a major controversy erupted before the tournament as the Senegal and Uzbekistan national teams faced unusually strict security checks upon arriving in the United States. Senegal players underwent thorough individual searches immediately after disembarking from their plane, while the Uzbekistan delegation was inspected by police narcotics dogs before entering the stadium for a friendly match. These intensive measures by U.S. authorities, one of the World Cup co-hosts, sparked widespread reactions on social media, with users saying the players were being "treated like criminals" and calling the incidents "shameful", "disgusting", and an "embarrassment". In addition, the Uruguay national team also faced an excessive security check, while players' luggage were inspected by sniffer dogs.

==== Labor disputes ====
Workers at SoFi Stadium, which hosted eight matches including the United States' opening game, voted 96 percent in favor of authorizing a strike in early June 2026 after working for a year without a contract. Unite Here Local 11, representing nearly 2,000 food service workers employed by Legends Hospitality, cited stalled negotiations over pay and safety protections related to potential ICE activity at the stadium. The union had asked FIFA and stadium operators to bar ICE from the venue and filed complaints with California regulators over FIFA's accreditation process, which collected workers' nationality and country of birth. A tentative agreement was reached on June 8, three days before the stadium's first match, preserving a contractual right for workers to strike if the union determined that federal immigration enforcement threatened worker safety during a match.

==== Labor rights ====
In June 2026, Equidem published a report detailing that labor violations took place during the construction of Texas Health Mansfield Stadium in Mansfield, Texas, which would become the training base for the Czech Republic national team. Reportedly, some of the violations included exploitation, accountability gaps among subcontractors, and severe health risks related to excessive wet bulb globe temperature measurements. Working conditions took place under 96 °F (36 °C) weather and involved daily exposure to toxic silica dust and insulation materials.

== FIFA rules, officiating, and regulations ==
=== Officiating controversies ===
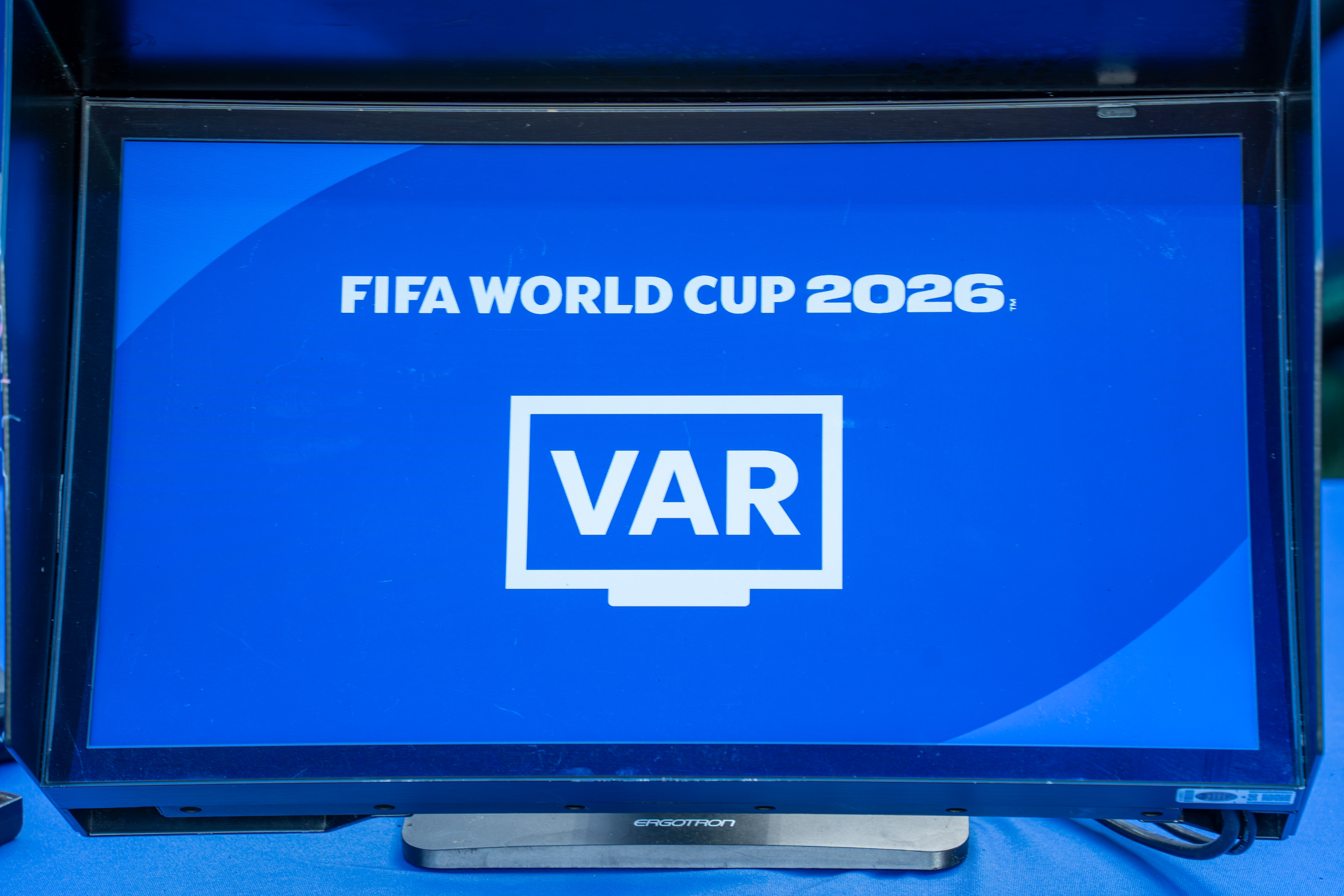
VAR at the 2026 FIFA World Cup

The tournament saw a number of contentious refereeing and VAR decisions. Qatar's Assim Madibo received an extended five-match ban for a challenge that broke the leg of Canada's Ismaël Koné, a punishment some commentators called excessive. Ghana manager Carlos Queiroz criticized VAR for not intervening on two penalty-area incidents in a draw with England. Germany's elimination on penalties to Paraguay followed a disallowed extra-time goal that head coach Julian Nagelsmann called "a joke", though FIFA defended the call. Senegal were eliminated by a stoppage-time VAR penalty awarded to Belgium that critics argued should not have been given. United States forward Folarin Balogun's VAR-reviewed red card against Bosnia and Herzegovina was widely called excessive and drew comparisons to a similar, uncarded challenge by Lionel Messi against Algeria.

Further disputes followed in the knockout rounds. Portugal's win over Croatia involved a contested VAR penalty and a Croatia equalizer disallowed via FIFA's Connected Ball technology, prompting a formal complaint from the Croatian Football Federation. France's physical win over Paraguay drew criticism of the referee's man-management, and its aftermath included widely condemned racist remarks about Kylian Mbappé by a Paraguayan senator that prompted a French criminal investigation. FIFA also suspended Folarin Balogun's one-match ban after his controversial red card against Bosnia and Herzegovina, allowing him to face Belgium, a decision praised in the United States but criticized abroad following Donald Trump's public call for a review. England's Jarell Quansah received a two-match ban for a red card against Mexico, with a UK lawmaker unsuccessfully calling for it to be reconsidered in light of the Balogun precedent. Argentina's comeback win over Egypt was marred by a disallowed Egyptian goal, an anti-racism gesture from coach Hossam Hassan, and an official Egyptian complaint alleging bias, which FIFA's refereeing chief Pierluigi Collina rejected. Finally, an England equalizer against Norway was allowed to stand despite claims the ball had struck an overhead camera cable, which FIFA disputed using ball-tracking data.

The 2026 FIFA World Cup final between Argentina and Spain, played on 19 July 2026 at MetLife Stadium in East Rutherford, New Jersey and won 1–0 by Spain after extra time, included an officiating decision that drew the attention of the media. In the 82nd minute, Argentina midfielder Enzo Fernández was given a yellow card for dissent after reacting angrily to referee Slavko Vinčić's decision to allow play to continue following contact from Spain's Rodri, with no free kick or card shown for the challenge. In the third minute of second-half stoppage time, Fernández was given a second yellow card, and a resulting red card, for a late challenge on Spain's Pau Cubarsí while chasing a clearance, leaving Argentina to play the remainder of the match with ten men. Spain went on to win the match 1–0 in extra time via a goal from substitute Ferran Torres, securing the country's second men's World Cup title.

=== Modification of kits ===
Before the tournament, FIFA required the Haiti national team to alter its kit because it depicted the Battle of Vertières, citing equipment regulations prohibiting political, religious, or personal messages or slogans on team kits.

=== Spanish language at press conferences ===
During the early days of the tournament, a Mexican reporter was prevented from asking Moroccan player Achraf Hakimi a question in Spanish at an official FIFA post-match press conference, after being told that Spanish-language interpretation was not available at the venue, although Hakimi, who was born and raised in Spain, could also speak the language. At several press conferences, including those held with representatives of the Brazil and Morocco squads, accredited Spanish-speaking reporters were asked by FIFA moderators to switch to English in order to keep proceedings moving, citing the absence of simultaneous interpretation. In some cases, questions were either turned away or translated unofficially by those present.

Spanish is one of FIFA's seven official languages, alongside English, French, German, Arabic, Portuguese and Russian, as established by amendments to the FIFA Statutes in 2022. FIFA had previously provided simultaneous interpretation in at least English, French, German, and Spanish at World Cup press events, with additional languages added based on the teams involved. Mexico, one of the three co-hosts of the 2026 tournament, is the world's most populous Spanish-speaking country. FIFA changed their policy to allow Spanish even if a Spanish-speaking country was not involved.

=== Shaun Evans hand gesture controversy ===
During the referee introductions before the June 14 group stage match between Germany and Curaçao, Australian VAR official Shaun Evans was seen on camera making an upside-down OK gesture, which, among other connotations, is sometimes associated with white supremacy. While the Anti-Defamation League noted that "use of the okay symbol in most contexts is entirely innocuous and harmless", the symbol had been used by white supremacists on 4chan and spread in white power circles. After investigating the incident, FIFA said that they found no evidence that Evans had intentionally made a racist hand gesture. In a statement released on June 15, the FIFA Disciplinary Committee confirmed that "after looking into the matter involving support video assistant referee Shaun Evans, it has found no evidence of breaches of the FIFA Disciplinary Code."

Evans said that he did not intentionally perform the hand gesture, calling it a "subconscious twitch", while also saying "I would like to clarify that I did not intentionally make a hand gesture or symbol to communicate a message, affiliation, game or belief of any kind." On June 16, Evans was officially cleared by FIFA of any wrongdoing, and was announced to be returning to duty for the June 21 match between New Zealand and Egypt. In subsequent games after the incident, the VAR officials in the pre-match formalities were shown being at their monitors instead of posing for the camera. There was no official response from FIFA for this change.

== Racism and discrimination incidents ==
=== Racist comments against France and Kylian Mbappé ===
Before France met Paraguay in the round of 16, former Paraguay goalkeeper José Luis Chilavert wrote that the French were a squad from Africa, drawing condemnation from the French football federation president.

After Paraguay was eliminated following their tie with France in the round of 16, Paraguayan senator Celeste Amarilla made comments about French captain Kylian Mbappé on social media which were widely condemned as racist. (Note: Attributed to multiple references:) Mbappé called Amarilla "despicable", and the French Football Federation announced that it would file a criminal complaint with the Public Prosecutor's Office. French prosecutors subsequently opened an investigation into the alleged racist abuse. (Note: Attributed to multiple references:)

=== Egyptian team and the Israeli–Palestinian conflict ===
Following Egypt's round of 32 victory over Australia, Egyptian coach Hossam Hassan celebrated by waving a Palestinian flag and said he dedicated the victory to both the Egyptian and Palestinian people. FIFA told The Guardian that the display of the flag was permitted because Palestine was one of its 211 member associations, prompting criticism from some Israeli circles. The incident reportedly influenced an Argentine fan to wave an Israeli flag in front of Hassan after Egypt's defeat to Argentina in the following round. Hassan appeared to approach the fan waving the Israeli flag before spitting in the direction of the flag, prompting security staff to restrain him.

=== Pride Match (Egypt vs Iran) ===
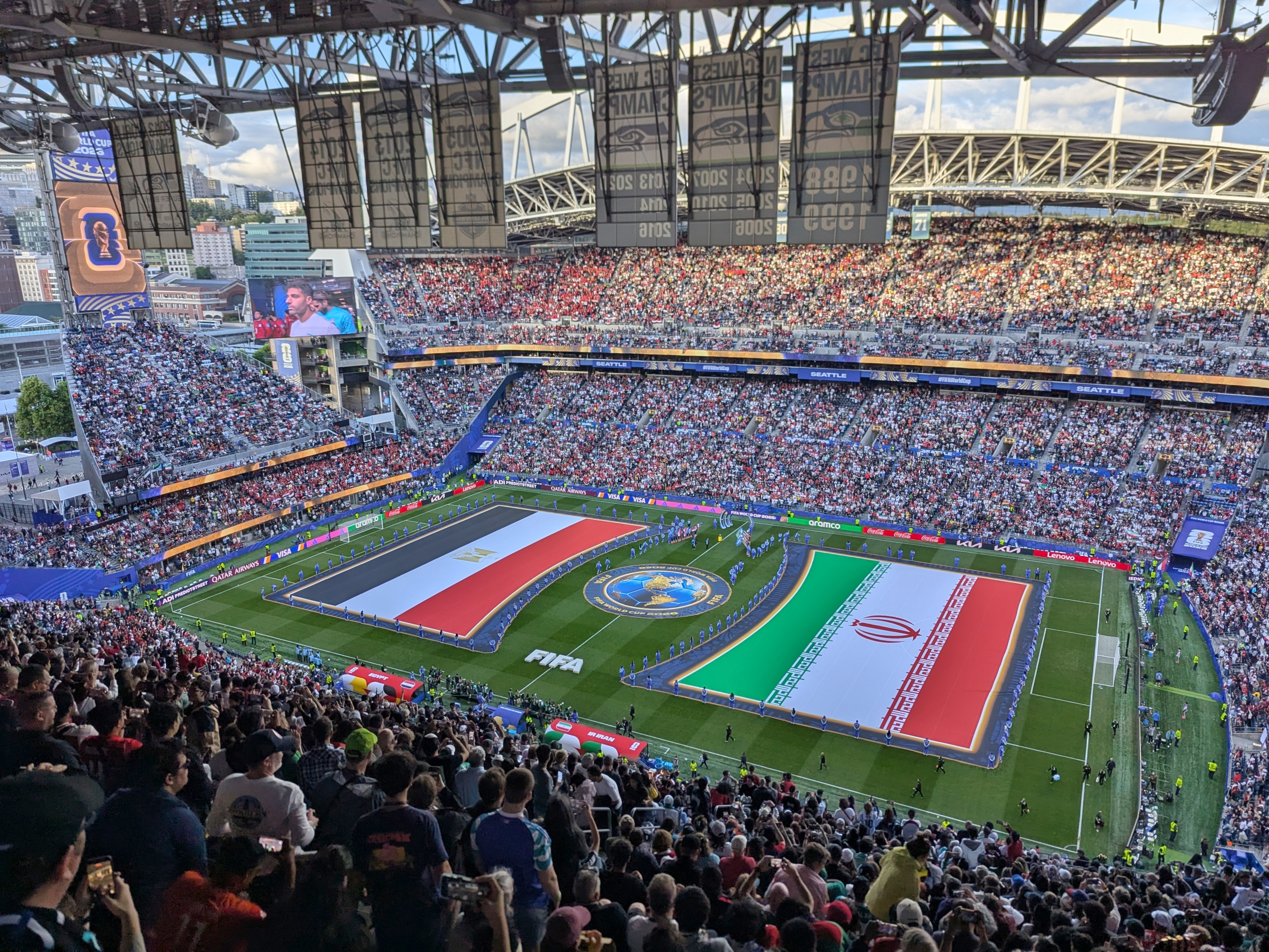
Egypt vs Iran

Prior to the match draw, Seattle's local organizing committee (without FIFA endorsement) announced that it would promote the June 26 match as a "Pride Match". However, the draw resulted the match featuring Egypt and Iran, two countries where homosexuality is punishable by law. This drew controversy as Iran and Egypt attempted to get the pro-LGBTQ aspects of the match cancelled while the organizing committee stated that "The Pride Match has been scheduled to celebrate and elevate Pride events in Seattle and across the country and it was planned well in advance." People in rainbow attire and/or with pride flags and protestors against the Iranian government as well as the criminalization of homosexuality were present at and around the match.

=== Mexican racist gesture towards South Korean fan ===
During the June 11 match between South Korea and the Czech Republic, a Mexican man was filmed making a racist gesture towards a South Korean fan in the stands. The fan, Yoon Su Jin, a Korean YouTuber who also went by the name "Ino Cat", posted a video of the incident on social media, and it quickly went viral. Yoon made a post on Instagram in which she thanked her fans for their support, and said, "You travelled across the world for the World Cup ... and experienced racism." The Mexican man was later identified as Ulises Fernando Bernal Miramontes, who was reported to have lost his job at an engineering firm soon after the match. On June 14, Bernal posted a public apology on social media, acknowledging that the video had circulated widely and "generated a wide range of reactions". Yoon was invited by FIFA to attend the June 18 match between South Korea and Mexico.

=== Online racist abuse against players ===
Following the Netherlands' elimination from the tournament after a penalty shoot-out loss to Morocco, several Dutch players, including Justin Kluivert, Quinten Timber, and Crysencio Summerville, who all failed to convert their penalties, were subjected to racist abuse on social media platforms. The Royal Dutch Football Association (KNVB) described the abuse as "terrible" and said that, "racism and discrimination had no place in football, on the internet, or in society", and that it would file complaints with Meld.Online Discriminatie, the dedicated Dutch reporting hub for racist and hateful content found online. Dutch Minister for Sport Mirjam Sterk also condemned the abuse as "deeply regrettable" and said cases could be referred to police for investigation.

Reports also circulated online claiming the existence of a formal petition targeting migrant-background German national team players following their elimination against Paraguay, which were later debunked as misinformation.

=== IShowSpeed racism controversy ===
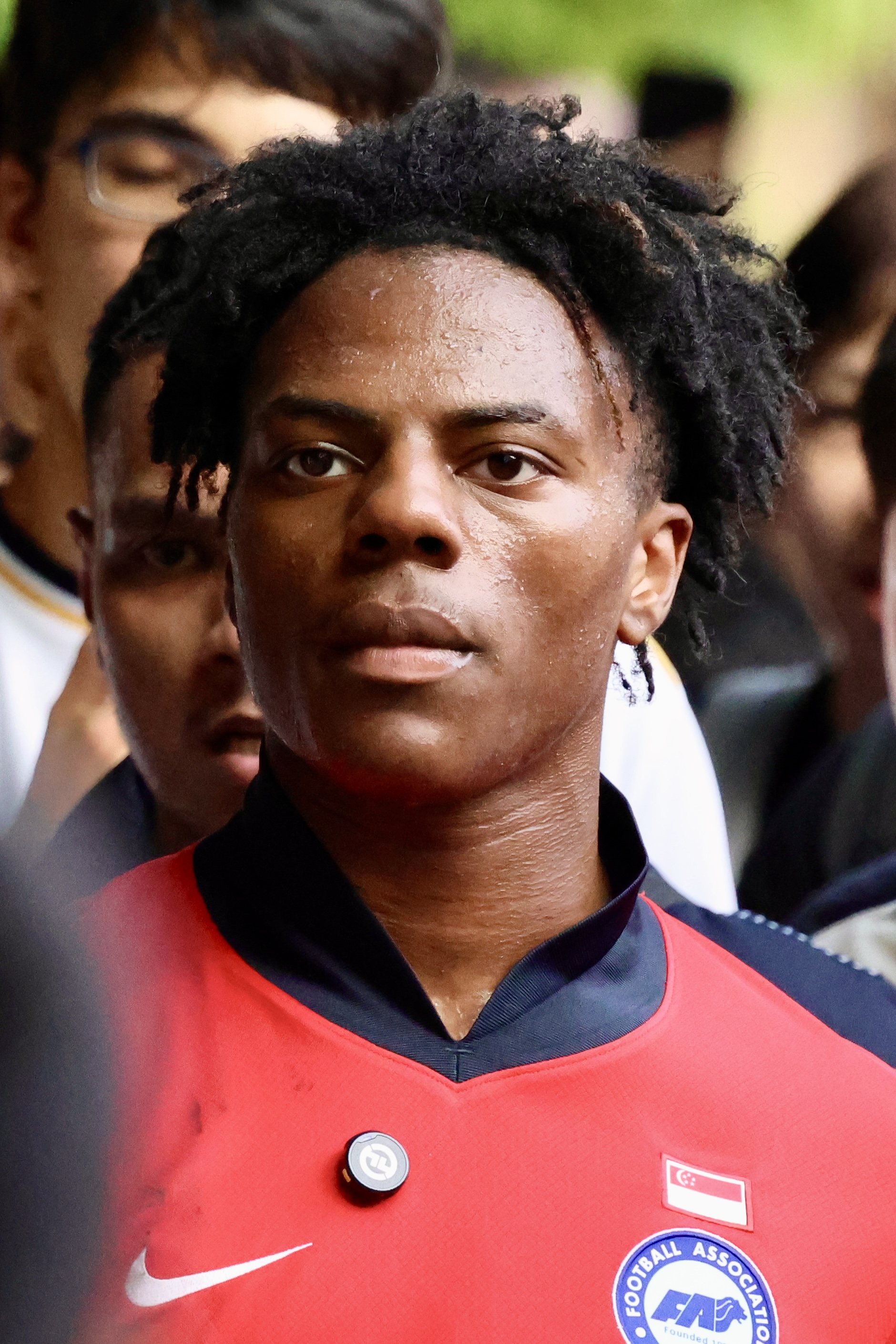
Streamer IShowSpeed was the target of racist insults at the 2026 World Cup.

During the July 3 round of 32 match between Argentina and Cape Verde at Miami Stadium, streamer and internet personality IShowSpeed was the target of racist chants heard in certain sections of the crowd. Speed had been streaming live from the match while wearing a Cape Verde jersey, when fans wearing Argentina shirts started surrounding him. A fan near Speed in the stands allegedly used a racial slur and told him to "go home". Another fan was heard telling him to "go cry at the zoo" in Spanish. After initially responding to the fans, Speed ignored them and continued watching the match. Footage of the incident went viral on social media and prompted FIFA to issue a condemnation statement. On July 6, FIFA launched an investigation into the incident after they became aware of an "alleged incident of racist abuse." FIFA said that it "strongly condemns racism, hate and discrimination in all forms" on a statement released on July 7 on the social media platform X. The incident fueled online discourse about the history of racism in Argentina.

In a different incident, which occurred during the July 7 round of 16 match between Argentina and Egypt, a fan in the stands appeared to be making monkey gestures at Speed, who was seated in the front row directly behind the Egyptian net. In an X post written in Spanish, the fan, posting under the name Micha, denied allegations of racism and said he had been attempting to mimic a gesture Speed made earlier in the match when he was attempting to distract Argentina's Lionel Messi during a penalty kick.

=== Mariano Rajoy's comments on the French team ===
On July 10, prior to the France–Spain semifinal match, former Prime Minister of Spain Mariano Rajoy wrote in El Debate that the French team "don't have any French players". The People's Party, Rajoy's party, stated that his comments were "without ill intent". French Football Federation President Philippe Diallo, French ministers Jean-Noël Barrot, Naïma Moutchou, and Laurent Nuñez, and French politicians Olivier Faure and Fabien Roussel spoke out against Rajoy's comments, with current Spanish Prime Minister Pedro Sánchez adding "may the best team win and may racism lose".

== Tournament expansion ==
The tournament expansion and qualifying spots allocation was a target of polemics. UEFA president Aleksander Čeferin reportedly called the expansion "unnecessary" and said that it would fill the tournament with "useless games". Thirteen qualified teams from both Asia and Africa quickly rebutted the UEFA president with an official statement, stating that for their countries, "there is no such thing as an unimportant World Cup match," and that "football does not belong to a select group of nations; we believe every nation that qualifies deserves respect. Every team has earned its place on merit. Every supporter has the right to dream. Every match carries meaning for millions of people around the world." The federations also mentioned that the impact of a World Cup qualification included the "acceleration football development", praising the impact of the expanded World Cup providing more opportunities to smaller nations. Four-time champions Italy had failed to qualify for the tournament, having finished second in their qualifying group to Norway before losing the play-off final to Bosnia and Herzegovina 4–1 on penalties after a 1–1 draw, with some fans and journalists calling for a spot for Italy instead of smaller nations.

A 2023 FIFA revision to the group stage format was criticized for its perceived excessive length (72 group stage matches, up from 48 in the original expansion proposal) and for lacking in jeopardy, as only 16 teams would be eliminated before the knockout stage. In The Athletic, Michael Cox wrote that "on average — there simply isn't a huge amount of meaning in any individual group stage match. ... there is a danger that the group stage will feel more like a qualification phase than a proper World Cup." Despite said remarks, the 2026 World Cup proceeded with 48 teams distributed in 12 groups, with FIFA president Gianni Infantino claiming that the following tournament might even consist of 64 teams.

== Player controversies ==
=== Granit Xhaka reaction controversy ===
Following Switzerland's 4–1 win over Bosnia and Herzegovina, the Swiss captain Granit Xhaka became the subject of criticism for what USA Today described as "toxic rumors" due to a hand gesture he made while on the field after scoring a late penalty goal. It was reportedly in response to previous allegations of creating a toxic environment, with Xhaka saying, "They know why I did it," after the match.

=== Korea FA defeat and corruption investigations ===
Following South Korea's surprise World Cup group stage elimination thanks to a defeat against South Africa, South Korean president Lee Jae Myung called for an investigation into the Korea Football Association (KFA). Hong Myung-bo's re-appointment as South Korea head coach in 2024 was met with allegations of favoritism, with the sports ministry calling for a review of the process at the time. Hong and KFA president Chung Mong-gyu both resigned from their positions shortly after the team's elimination. Chung submitted his formal resignation letter earlier in the day after presiding over his final meeting with senior executives at Korea Football Park in Cheonan.

=== Alexi Lalas "free soccer" controversy ===
On July 3, after the United States defeated Bosnia and Herzegovina in the round of 32, American commentator and former national team player Alexi Lalas was asked on X for his opinion on whether the American "pay to play" system was ruining youth soccer in America. Lalas responded with a post saying "Sure. Pay to play is not ruining youth soccer. Millions benefit. It's a business catering to a market willing to pay for the product. Soccer (like piano lessons) is not an inalienable right. Free soccer costs money. Someone has to pay. So who will pay for all this free soccer?" After the United States lost to Belgium in the round of 16, Lalas made another post about his opinion on free soccer, saying "I’d love if soccer was free to all. But who is going to pay for all this free soccer?" His comments drew widespread debate and discourse around the soccer world, with one critic posting "Youth sports should not be a business", to which Lalas directly responded "So they should be taxpayers funded government entities or charities?"

On The Dan Patrick Show, Entertainment Tonight host Kevin Frazier and producer Seton O’Connor both used their platforms to challenge Lalas' stance. O’Connor said "Why do companies think that buying 30 seconds of advertising creates more value than building the next generation of players? I feel like that’s something that a proud American and a proud capitalist who also loves soccer, like Alexi Lalas, could speak to." Lalas was labelled as "part of the problem" of why the United States men's national team had underperformed on the world stage.

=== Leandro Paredes' physical altercation against Spain national team ===
Following the full time whistle in the World Cup final, Argentine midfielder Leandro Paredes was involved in an altercation where he pushed Spain players Eric García and then unused substitute Gavi; Paredes was initially sent off for a red card for his altercation before it was overturned altogether, which meant he had to leave the field before the medal ceremony. FIFA confirmed it would investigate Argentina over post-game scenes described as “shocking and disgraceful” following the match in New Jersey. In the days that followed, the teams attempted to tone the incident down, with Argentina assistant coach Roberto Ayala apologizing and Gavi speaking against possible suspensions for his rivals. On 21 August 2026, FIFA announced that Paredes was handed a ten-match ban for his actions.

== Legal issues ==
=== StubHub ticket cancellations ===
During the tournament, American ticket reselling platform StubHub was widely criticized following multiple reports that fans had their resale tickets cancelled shortly before matches, even though they were purchased weeks or months in advance. Affected customers claimed they could not enter the games, and were offered refunds, or even "store credit", rather than alternative tickets. The issue resulted in a class-action lawsuit against the company.

=== Dallas mural lawsuit ===
The Whaling Wall mural in Dallas, pictured before it was painted over

In June 2026, marine artist Robert Wyland filed a $25 million lawsuit against FIFA after his Whaling Wall 82 / Ocean Life mural in downtown Dallas was painted over to make room for World Cup advertisements. Wyland's mural, which had originally been painted in 1999 to raise awareness about ocean pollution, had been mostly painted over by May 18. Wyland's legal team cited the Visual Artists Rights Act (VARA), a U.S. copyright law that protected prominent public art from unauthorized destruction or defacement. According to an official statement, "FIFA has no involvement in this whatsoever and refers all inquiries on this matter to the host city committee." Wyland said he was "shocked" when he learned that FIFA would be whitewashing the mural, and called the impending lawsuit "a David and Goliath thing for sure".

=== Chapultepec Castle gala dinner ===
The day before the opening match, FIFA organized a gala dinner at Chapultepec Castle, a building that forms part of Mexico's national heritage, and a UNESCO World Heritage Site building. President Sheinbaum attended the event. When asked about the use of the historic building for the gala, Sheinbaum stated that the castle is available for rent, commenting that FIFA paid over 1 million pesos. However, the castle's official website states that the venue may be used exclusively for cultural, academic, or scientific events and explicitly prohibits its use for social or commercial gatherings. Researchers at the National Institute of Anthropology and History (INAH) filed a complaint with the Attorney General office. The Secretary of Culture, Claudia Curiel, dismissed the complaint, stating that it lacked merit because the event was considered cultural in nature. She added that it involved "the payment of fees for the use of the venue as part of a cultural diplomacy event." The INAH classified all "contracts, agreements, or any related documents" pertaining to the event as confidential for five years.

=== Usage of Persona characters by Croatia ===
In a social media post celebrating the Croatia national soccer team's 1–0 win over Panama on June 23, the Croatian Football Federation posted an image that included the characters Joker and Morgana from the Persona video game series. This led Atlus, the copyright holders of the Persona characters, to open an investigation into the matter, but the issue was eventually settled out of court.

=== FBI investigations on Argentine Football Association ===
On July 8, 2026, Argentine newspaper La Nación reported that the Federal Bureau of Investigation (FBI), together with U.S. federal prosecutors, was conducting a preliminary investigation into the Argentine Football Association (AFA) over suspected money laundering and fraud. The investigation reportedly focused on financial operations involving the commercial rights of the Argentina national team, including the alleged diversion of millions of U.S. dollars through Florida-based companies. According to the report, investigators were examining transactions totaling approximately US$300 million, including more than US$42 million alleged to have been improperly diverted, although no criminal charges had been announced.

=== Prohibited items policy ===
A request for an emergency temporary restraining order (TRO) was filed in California against FIFA's ban on political symbols, which prevented fans from bringing flags—including the Lion and Sun flag—at SoFi Stadium. The case was dismissed without any TRO being issued.

=== California Attorney General inquiry ===
On May 13, California attorney general Rob Bonta sent a letter to FIFA regarding his concerns about potentially misleading ticketing practices relating to the upcoming World Cup, as they may have violated California's strict consumer protection laws. In a statement, Bonta said "Californians deserve transparency and fairness when purchasing tickets for any event held in our state. Californians should be able to trust that the seats they purchase match the representations made during the sales process. We look forward to receiving the requested information from FIFA as part of our ongoing review." Bonta requested various information about ticket sales for World Cup games in California to assess whether any state laws may have been violated.

=== DOJ Mass Piracy Takedown (Operation Offsides) ===
Image uploaded to seized domains by the Department of Justice

On June 26, the United States Department of Justice (DOJ) announced the seizure of nearly 400 internet domains that were being used to illegally stream World Cup matches. The websites were identified to be providing visitors with unauthorized real-time streams of World Cup matches in direct violation of U.S. copyright law. Assistant Attorney General A. Tysen Duva of the Justice Department's Criminal Division confirmed in a statement that the DOJ had "seized hundreds of domains, used to illegally stream World Cup matches for profit, to disrupt the international networks that profit from the global popularity of the World Cup."

The actions were taken by U.S. coordination with international partners through the International Computer Hacking and Intellectual Property (ICHIP) Network, with authorities reported to be targeting servers and domains located in Peru, Bulgaria, Croatia, Romania, Poland, and Colombia. U.S. authorities provided information to national law enforcement agencies to assist them in identifying seized domains. FIFA also provided assistance to international agents, as well as corporations such as NBCUniversal, beIN Media Group, the Motion Picture Association's Alliance for Creativity and Entertainment, Ultimate Fighting Championship, and Warner Bros. According to Director Ivan J. Arvelo of the National Intellectual Property Rights Coordination Center, "Through Operation Offsides and strong partnerships with law enforcement and the private sector, we identified and seized hundreds of domains, disrupting those who steal and distribute copyrighted content. Our ongoing efforts ensure that the excitement of the World Cup reaches fans through legitimate, secure channels." The Justice Department also published an infographic that was displayed on removed piracy sites, which read "This website has been seized by law enforcement authorities as part of Operation Offsides, a coordinated global effort led by the National Intellectual Property Rights Coordination Center with international law enforcement and private sector partners. This action was taken to protect consumers and enforce intellectual property rights worldwide."

Less than a week later, The Athletic reported that 1,376 illegal World Cup streaming sites had their advertising revenue cut off, a move led by the non-profit Trustworthy Accountability Group (TAG), which worked with its partners to create a "pirate domain exclusion list" of illegal sites, which it shared with digital advertising companies to block the distribution of funds to those sites. According to a report published by SatNews, the DOJ relied on public-private data sharing model to identify illegal piracy websites. Additional resources such as network mapping, signal telemetry, and proprietary tracking data were also provided by international anti-piracy coalitions. An analysis of the seized server connections published by the DOJ noted that visitors to the sites were frequently exposed to unencrypted connections, deceptive advertising redirects, browser hijacking scripts, and banking trojans potentially collecting user data.

== Security incidents and threats ==
=== Theft of sporting equipment ===
On June 13, the England national team reported the theft of part of its sporting equipment during its transfer from West Palm Beach, Florida to its base camp in Kansas City, Missouri. The stolen items reportedly included cleats belonging to players such as Harry Kane, Jude Bellingham and Anthony Gordon, as well as official match balls, analytical materials and essential technical equipment used by the coaching staff in their daily work, which had an estimated value of US$18,000. Two men were charged, and the majority of what was stolen was recovered by the police.

=== Egypt hotel security incident ===
A security incident occurred at Westin Hotel in Arlington, Texas, ahead of Egypt's round of 32 match against Australia. A Dallas police officer pushed Egypt assistant coach Ibrahim Hassan and another member of the delegation, who were not wearing credentials, away from Egyptian player Trézéguet, who was taking pictures with a young fan. This led to a brief verbal exchange with the police officer. The situation was quickly de-escalated on site, and the Egyptian Football Association later confirmed that the matter was minor, with team preparations continuing as normal. Dallas police said they had responded to a hotel security request after an individual without event credentials attempted to gain access, and later expressed appreciation to the Egyptian delegation by presenting a gold World Cup security badge.

=== Armed attack in Yautepec ===
An armed attack occurred at a multi-use sports field in Yautepec, Morelos, Mexico, during an event organized to broadcast the round of 32 match between Mexico and Ecuador. Three people were killed, and nine others injured, including mayoral pre-candidate Sandra Fernández Gómez.

=== Bomb threat at MetLife Stadium ===
On July 5, during the round of 16 match between Brazil and Norway, two individuals, including 26-year-old Amar Ramkissoon, threatened to blow up the area in which the individual sent a text message to FIFA around 4:15 p.m. ET. Authorities quickly tracked the threat, and were later arrested and charged after a text message threatened to "blow up" a World Cup match at MetLife Stadium, leading New Jersey State Police to charge Ramkissoon with creating a false public alarm and making terroristic threats. The threat ultimately did not disrupt the match.

== Drone controversies ==
On July 18, The Federal Bureau of Investigation (FBI) claimed it had seized more than 700 illegal drones — and detected almost 1,600 in total — around the eleven stadiums in the United States during the World Cup. The agency added in a statement on its website that the threat of drones was "a growing problem at special events", which is why it said it had put in place the "most comprehensive airspace security and drone mitigation effort in U.S. history".

For the World Cup, security forces established "no-drone zones" of a three nautical-mile radius and 3,000 feet above ground level around stadiums, unless otherwise authorised by air traffic control. Those who flew drones into restricted airspace faced fines of up to US$100,000, confiscation of equipment, and criminal charges, according to the FBI.

The FBI worked with the Federal Aviation Administration (FAA) to enforce temporary flight restrictions (TFRs), using federally authorized capabilities to detect, track, and assess unauthorized drone activity, with personnel from both agencies deployed full-time to identify drone activity that could threaten aviation safety, critical infrastructure, or publicity safety out or around event venues. Before every flight, drone operators were meant to check for active flight restrictions using FAA-approved B4UFLY service providers.

Below were the TFRs established for Philadelphia events:

- Within a 3 Nautical Mile Radius (NMR) and up to 3,000 feet above ground level, unless otherwise authorized by ATC, all aircraft operations were prohibited in the vicinity of the Philadelphia Stadium on June 14, 19, 22, 25, 27, and July 4.
- Within a 1 Nautical Mile Radius (NMR) and up to 1,000 feet above ground level, unless otherwise authorized, all UAS operations were prohibited in the vicinity of Lemon Hill Park from June 11 to 30, and July 1 to 19.

Andrew Giuliani, executive director for the White House World Cup Task Force, told The Athletic prior to the tournament that "drones getting above players or fans" was "an emerging threat" that organisers had prepared for long in advance of the World Cup. He said that some who had violated the temporary flight restrictions — underpinned by the Safer Skies Act, which was brought in last year — may have simply been "putting it up to go and take a look at the tailgate... but that obviously takes resources away in case there are potentially evildoers that are doing that."

Counter-unmanned aircraft systems (C-UAS) were installed around venues, including at MetLife Stadium, the host of the final. The ‘C-UAS Fly Away Kit’ at MetLife was manufactured by defence company Anduril and comprised a launch box, communication tower, and 360-degree electro-optical/infrared visual detection and camera system.

In another incident, law enforcement officials confiscated over 700 devices nationwide across American host cities, including 95 in Atlanta and 94 in North Texas. The enforcement led to federal criminal charges and civil penalties for operators violating strict temporary flight restrictions, and was also used as a counter measure against piracy streaming services.

== Legacy contribution dispute ==
Following the 2026 FIFA World Cup, several U.S. host cities claimed FIFA had failed to deliver promised $1 million legacy contributions intended for community projects. City officials said FIFA representatives had repeatedly assured them the payments would be made, but no funds had been distributed. The issue sparked criticism over the financial burden placed on host cities, which covered major costs such as security, transportation, and operations while FIFA retained most tournament revenues.
