= Živilė =

Živilė is a female given name of Lithuanian origin that may refer to:

- Živilė Balčiūnaitė (born 1979), Lithuanian long-distance runner
- Živilė Pinskuvienė (born 1975), Lithuanian politician
- Živilė Raudonienė (born 1982), Lithuanian fitness model, bodybuilder and former professional wrestler
- Živilė Rezgytė, Lithuanian gymnast and business executive
- Živilė Vaiciukevičiūtė (born 1996), Lithuanian race walker
