= Juan Soto (referee) =

Venezuelan football referee (born 1977)

- Full name: Juan Ernesto Soto Arévalo
- Born: Caracas, Venezuela
- Other occupation: Civil engineer

Domestic
Years	League	

International
Years	League	Role
2005-2023	FIFA	Referee
2021-	FIFA	VAR

Juan Ernesto Soto Arévalo (born 14 October 1977) is a Venezuelan football referee. He was a FIFA referee from 2005 to 2023 and a FIFA video match official since 2021. He was the Assistant Video Assistant Referee (AVAR) for the 2022 FIFA World Cup final.

== Career ==
Soto was a FIFA referee from 2005 through 2023. He refereed many international tournaments including the 2011 Copa America, the 2012 Olympic Games, and the 2013 U17 World Cup. He transitioned to become a FIFA video match official in 2021.

He was selected as a VAR for the 2022 FIFA World Cup in Qatar. He was appointed as the AVAR for the final between Argentina and France.

Soto has been a VAR for several Club World Cups. He was appointed as an AVAR for the final in 2023. He also was assigned the VAR for the 2024 FIFA Intercontinental Cup Final.

Soto was invited back for his second World Cup for the 2026 FIFA World Cup in North America. He received five assignments as a VAR or AVAR in the group stage.

On July 2, 2026, Soto was the VAR for the round of 32 knockout match between the United States and Bosnia. During the match, he triggered a review for a red card on Folarin Balogun for serious foul play. After reviewing the slow motion replays, referee Raphael Claus controversially sent Balogun off. However, the day before the US national team was set to play Belgium in the round of 16, FIFA suspended the ban after a call from Donald Trump.

== See also ==
- Folarin Balogun red card controversy
