= Živilė Rezgytė =

Lithuanian-American businesswoman (born 1979)

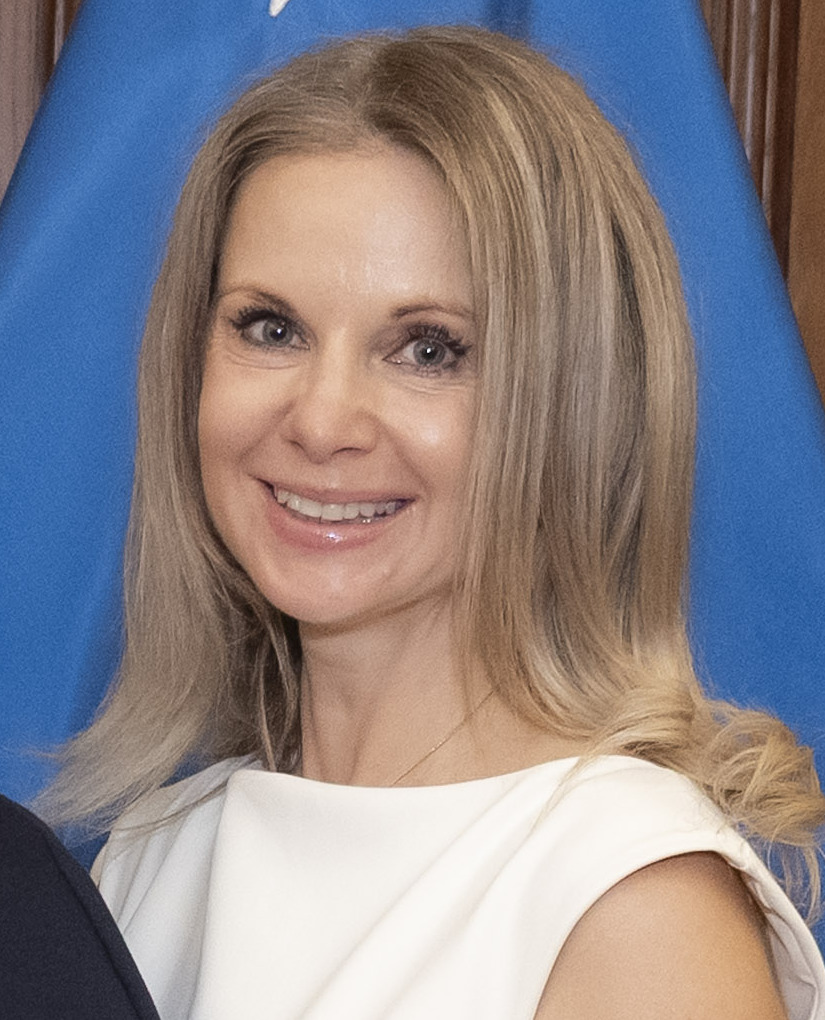
- Born: 1979 (age 46–47); Klaipėda, Lithuanian SSR, Soviet Union
- Spouse: Andrew Giuliani (m. 2017)
- Children: 1
- Relatives: Donna Hanover (mother-in-law), Rudy Giuliani (father-in-law)

Živilė Rezgytė (born 1979) is a Lithuanian-American business executive and former rhythmic gymnast who competed in the 1990s. After immigrating to the United States, she began working as a business executive. Rezgytė married Andrew Giuliani, son of former New York City Mayor Rudy Giuliani, in 2017.

== Early life and gymnastics career ==
Rezgytė was born in 1979 and raised in Klaipėda, Lithuania. She trained as a rhythmic gymnast and, in 1996, competed in the 1996 Rhythmic Gymnastics European Championships in both the individual and team categories. The next year, she competed in the 1997 World Rhythmic Gymnastics Championships in Berlin, representing Lithuania in the individual category. She also competed in the Rhythmic Gymnastics Grand Prix.

== Business career ==
Rezgytė immigrated to the United States, taking up residency in New York City, in the early 2000s. She later became an American citizen.

In 2004, Rezgytė began working in the real estate industry as a broker with RE/Max Millennium. She started working for First American Financial Corporation in 2012 and has become a Vice President.

== Personal life ==
On September 25, 2014, Rezgytė met Andrew Giuliani while attending a New York Yankees game at Yankee Stadium. After Giuliani proposed in Palanga, they married on July 14, 2017, in a Catholic ceremony celebrated by Monsignor Alan Placa at the Church of St. Joseph in Greenwich Village. Their daughter Grace Juzefa was born in 2021.
