= FIFA World Cup 2026 Task Force =

United States government task force

The FIFA World Cup 2026 Task Force was a United States government task force created to coordinate federal efforts in support of the 2025 FIFA Club World Cup and the 2026 FIFA World Cup.

The task force was abolished after the 2026 FIFA World Cup final on July 19, 2026.

== Background ==
The 2026 World Cup drew millions of tourists to the United States, Canada, and Mexico. The tournament featured 48 teams playing 104 matches, with 78 in the United States and 13 each in Canada and Mexico. The task force was announced on March 7, 2025 to oversee the logistics and security for the whole event over three countries.

== Structure ==
The task force was chaired by US President Donald Trump, with Vice President JD Vance serving as its Vice Chair. In May 2025, Trump announced that Andrew Giuliani, the son of former New York City Mayor Rudy Giuliani, would lead the task force, with Carlos Cordeiro, a senior advisor to FIFA, also serving on the task force.

A congressional task force, initially led by Michael McCaul and Mark Green, worked in parallel to support the White House Task Force through legislative means and oversight. The task force collaborated with multiple federal agencies, such as the Department of Homeland Security (DHS), the Federal Emergency Management Agency (FEMA), the Transportation Security Administration (TSA), and the Department of State.

=== Members ===
- Donald Trump: President of the United States (Chair)
- JD Vance: Vice President of the United States (Vice Chair)
- Andrew Giuliani: Executive Director of the White House Task Force on the FIFA World Cup 2026
- Marco Rubio: Secretary of State (also Acting National Security Advisor)
- Scott Bessent: Secretary of the Treasury
- Pete Hegseth: Secretary of Defense
- Todd Blanche: Acting Attorney General (previously Pam Bondi from March 2025 to April 2026)
- Howard Lutnick: Secretary of Commerce
- Sean Duffy: Secretary of Transportation
- Markwayne Mullin: Secretary of Homeland Security (previously Kristi Noem from March 2025 to March 2026)
- Dan Scavino: Assistant to the President and Deputy Chief of Staff
- Stephen Miller: Assistant to the President and Deputy Chief of Staff for Policy
- James Blair: Assistant to the President and Deputy Chief of Staff for Legislative, Political and Public Affairs (until May 2026)

== Events ==
The first meeting of the task force was held in public on May 6, 2025, where Trump and FIFA President Gianni Infantino stated that the World Cups would be the "biggest, safest, and most extraordinary soccer tournament in history while contributing almost $50 billion in economic output. While Infantino welcomed all visitors stating that "America will welcome the world," numerous comments were made by members such as Vance, that highlighted the Trump administration's aggressive deportation policies. Concerns were also raised about the ability for the administration to process and approve the large number of travel visas for foreign visitors and fans, which were brushed off by Homeland Secretary Kristi Noem.

In October 2025, it was announced that the Task Force was being designated $500 million by the Trump administration to support state and local governments to develop an anti-drone security strategy ahead of the tournaments. While currently only federal agencies can disrupt or intercept drones, the laws were reviewed by the administration and Justice Department.

== Response ==
FIFA President Gianni Infantino expressed support for the task force, and said that it would cause each visitor to feel safe, happy, and that they were "creating something special".
