= FIFA Disciplinary Code =

Sports ruleset

The FIFA Disciplinary Code (FDC) is a set of codes and regulations promulgated by FIFA's judicial bodies which are composed by its "Disciplinary Committee" and its "Appeal Committee".

The FDC regulates almost all issues related to doping, corruption, arbitration, racism, stadium bans, etc... It also details the code of conduct of football's world governing body.

== Committees ==
The FDC decisions and regulations engages the following FIFA committees:

- Player Status Committee
- Disciplinary Committee
- Appeal Committee
- Court of Arbitration for Sport

== See also ==
- International Olympic Committee
