= Andrew Giuliani =

American politician (born 1986)

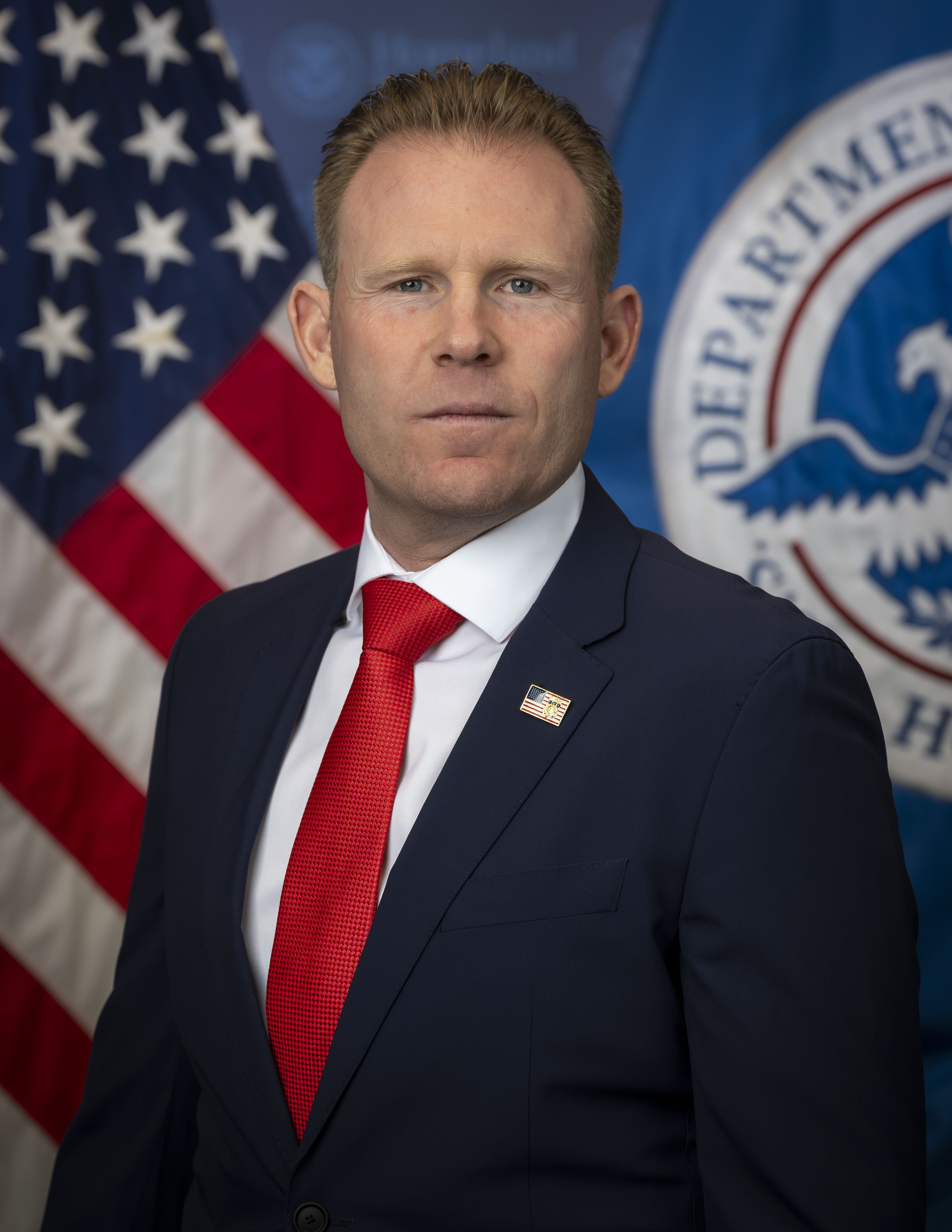
- Official portrait, 2025

Executive Director of the White House Task Force on the 2026 FIFA World Cup
- In office May 6, 2025 – July 19, 2026
- President: Donald Trump

Special Assistant to the President
- In office March 2019 – January 20, 2021
- President: Donald Trump

Associate Director of White House Office of Public Liaison
- In office March 6, 2017 – March 2019
- President: Donald Trump

Personal details
- Born: Andrew Harold Giuliani; January 30, 1986 (age 40) New York City, U.S.
- Party: Republican
- Spouse: Živilė Rezgytė (m. 2017)
- Children: 1
- Parents: Rudy Giuliani; Donna Hanover
- Relatives: Caroline Giuliani (sister)
- Education: Duke University (BA)

Andrew Harold Giuliani (born January 30, 1986) is an American politician, political commentator, and former professional golfer. He is the son of Rudy Giuliani, the former mayor of New York City.

A member of the Republican Party, Giuliani was a special assistant to the president and associate director of the Office of Public Liaison during the first administration of President Donald Trump. After working as a contributor for the conservative media channel Newsmax TV, Giuliani announced that he would be running for governor of New York in 2022. He lost the 2022 Republican gubernatorial primary to Lee Zeldin. Following Trump's return to the White House, he served as the executive director of the White House Task Force for the 2026 FIFA World Cup.

== Early life ==
Giuliani was born to Rudy Giuliani and Donna Hanover on January 30, 1986. He has one sister, Caroline, who was born in 1989.

At age seven, Giuliani was present at the ceremony when his father took the oath of office as mayor of New York City in 1994.

In October 2000, his father filed for divorce, which was finalized in July 2002. His mother was awarded custody.

Giuliani attended Saint Joseph Regional High School in Montvale, New Jersey, graduating in 2005. Giuliani studied marketing, management, and sociology at Duke University and graduated in May 2009 with a Bachelor of Arts degree. After college, Giuliani worked as a sales intern at CapRok Capital in Rye, New York.

== Golf career ==
In June 2001, at 15 years of age, he played in the pro-am at the Buick Classic at the Westchester Country Club, partnered with world #1 Tiger Woods. His father, Rudy Giuliani, was originally scheduled to play with Woods, but could not because of a sore left foot. Despite his inability to play, Rudy Giuliani accompanied Woods and his son.

Giuliani was recruited to Duke by golf coach Rod Myers, although Myers died shortly after, and a new coach, O.D. Vincent, was appointed. In February 2008, while Giuliani was a junior, he was cut from the team for breaches of discipline, which he said were minor or fabricated infractions.

Although Giuliani was already cut from the team, Vincent agreed to reinstate him if the rest of the team voted for it. On April 9, 2008, five of Giuliani's teammates sent him an email expressing a lack of interest in reinstating him. In July 2008, Giuliani sued the university, alleging that his golf coach "manufactured accusations against him to justify kicking him off the team to whittle the squad." He further claimed that the university, by way of the deceased Myers, had already verbally promised him a spot on the Blue Devils and “life-time access” to Duke golf facilities. The lawsuit was dismissed in 2010.

Giuliani turned pro at the beginning of 2009. In August of that year, he won the Metropolitan Open, earning $27,500, his only victory as a professional golfer. Between 2009 and 2016, he pursued a golf career by playing on minor league tours and participating in a Golf Channel reality show. In 2016, he started the process to regain his amateur status.

== Political career ==
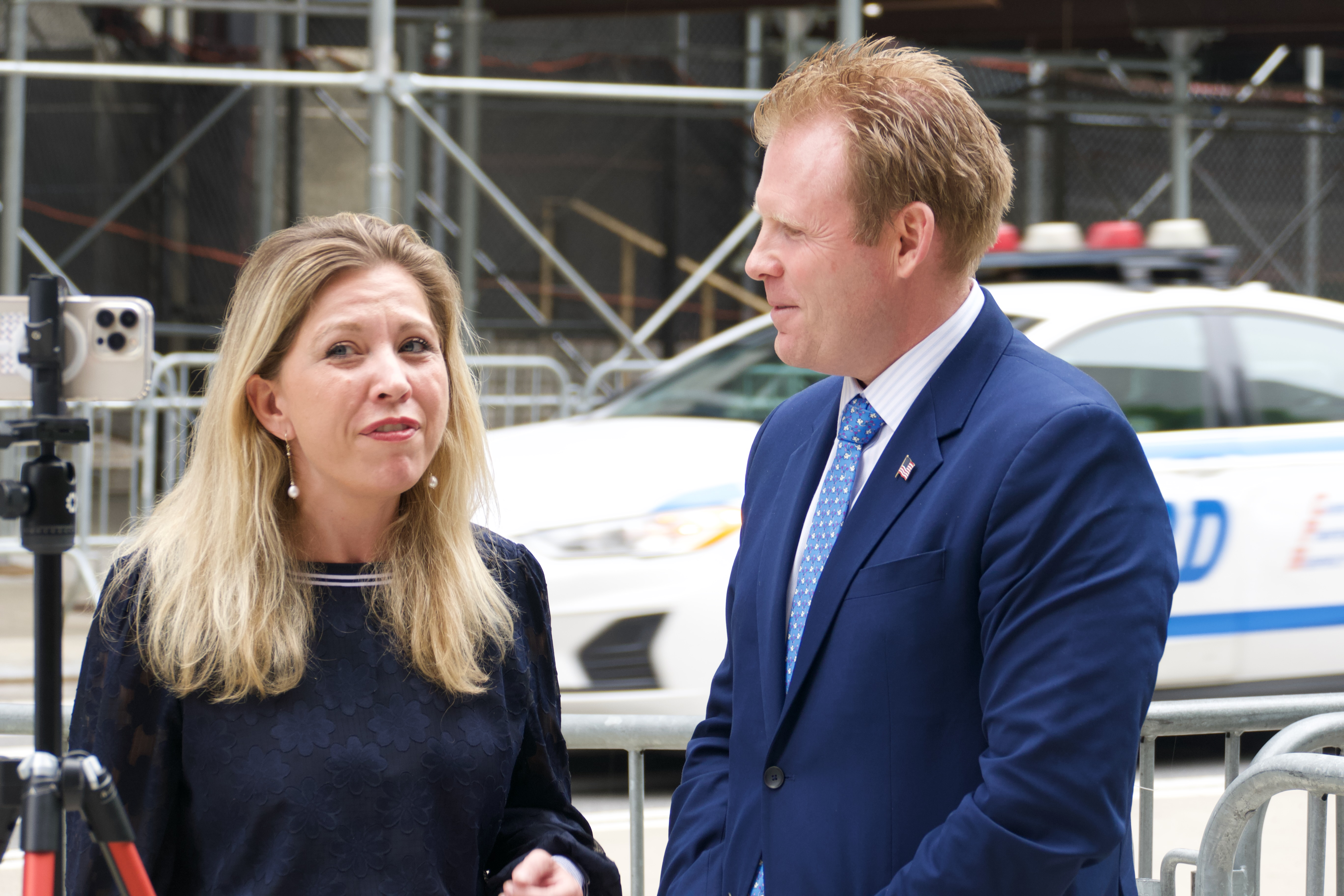
Giuliani reporting with Kasondra Watkins at the prosecution of Donald Trump in New York

=== First Trump administration (2017–2021) ===
In 2017, Giuliani was hired to work in the first Trump administration, in the Office of Public Liaison, as an Associate Director. In 2019, he was promoted to Special Assistant to the President. In his position, he helped arrange sports team's visits to the White House, and interfaced between the White House and business, nonprofit, and other groups, meeting with President Donald Trump up to four times a week. He also represented his office in White House meetings on the opioid crisis. He originally had an annual salary of $77,000, which by mid-2018 had increased to $90,700, and by mid-2019 was $95,000.

Giuliani's unescorted access to the West Wing was rescinded by White House Chief of Staff John F. Kelly around the beginning of June 2018. After Kelly's departure in January 2019, Mick Mulvaney restored Giuliani's access.

Giuliani has played golf with Trump since Giuliani was a teenager. Since starting work at the White House, he was a regular golf partner of Trump, and traveled with him for the sole purpose of playing a round or two of golf. In January 2020, The Irish Times called him "Trump's most regular playing partner". In December 2020, Giuliani was appointed to the board of trustees of the United States Holocaust Memorial Museum for a five-year term.

=== Gubernatorial run (2021–2022) ===
From March to May 2021, Giuliani was a contributor to Newsmax TV, hired to comment on news and politics. On May 18, 2021, Giuliani formally announced his candidacy for governor of New York in the 2022 gubernatorial election.

On September 24, 2021, Politico Playbook reported that Fox News had banned Giuliani and his father from appearing on air. The report was disputed by Fox News, which said Giuliani had made multiple appearances on the network since announcing his gubernatorial run.

Giuliani faced three other candidates in the 2022 Republican gubernatorial primary. He was defeated by Lee Zeldin, who held a 20-point lead over Giuliani.

=== Second Trump administration (2025–present) ===
In May 2025, Giuliani was appointed as the executive director of the White House Task Force for the 2026 FIFA World Cup, within the Department of Homeland Security. After a year in the job, he had generally positive reviews from the American cities participating in the World Cup.

== Personal life ==
Between 2010 and 2011, Giuliani dated Sarah Hughes, a competitive figure skater and Olympic gold medal winner.

In August 2016, he announced his engagement to Živilė Rezgytė, a Lithuanian-born real estate account executive whom he met at Yankee Stadium. They married in a Catholic ceremony at the Church of St. Joseph in Greenwich Village in Manhattan on July 14, 2017. Their daughter was born in 2021.

Giuliani was famously portrayed by Chris Farley in "Yankee Stadium Opening Day" in season 19 of Saturday Night Live.

== Electoral history ==
2022 Republican gubernatorial primary results
Party	Candidate	Votes	%
Republican	Lee Zeldin	193,184	44.1
Republican	Andrew Giuliani	100,372	22.9
Republican	Rob Astorino	80,223	18.3
Republican	Harry Wilson	64,594	14.7
Total votes		438,373	100
