= Craiova Group =

Cooperation project between Romania, Bulgaria, Greece and Serbia

Craiova Group: Група Крайова (Bulgarian); Ομάδα Κραϊόβα (Greek); Grupul Craiova (Romanian); Крајовска група (Serbian)
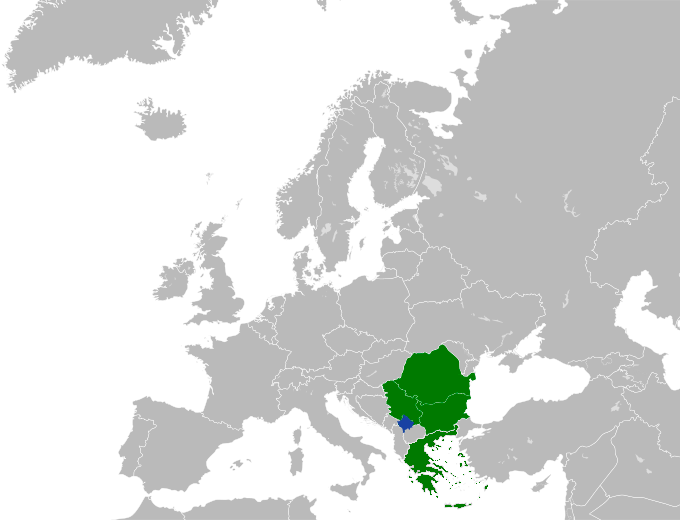
- Membership: Bulgaria; Romania; Serbia; Greece
- Establishment: 24 April 2015

Area
  - Total: 558,822 km^{2} (215,762 sq mi)

Population
  - 2026 estimate: ▼42,364,963
  - Density: 75.8/km^{2} (196.3/sq mi)
- GDP (PPP): 2026 estimate
  - Total: ▲$1.946 trillion
  - Per capita: ▲$45,936
- GDP (nominal): 2026 estimate
  - Total: ▲$1.033 trillion
  - Per capita: ▲$24,389
- HDI (2023): 0.858 very high

The Craiova Group (Quadrilateral), Craiova Four, or C4 is a cooperation project of four European states – Romania, Bulgaria, Greece and Serbia – for the purposes of furthering their European integration as well as economic, transport and energy cooperation with one another. The Group originated in a summit meeting of the heads of governments of Bulgaria, Romania and Serbia, held on 24 April 2015 in the Romanian city of Craiova. At the group's inaugural meeting, Romania's then-Prime Minister Victor Ponta indicated that he was inspired by the Visegrád Group. Romania and Bulgaria both joined the European Union in 2007, while Serbia has been in accession negotiations since 2014. Since 2017 meeting in Varna, Bulgaria and the inclusion of Greece, meetings have been quadrilateral.

One of the first initiatives, after a meeting in Vidin, Bulgaria, was to strengthen the telecommunication networks in the border areas of the countries. Other goals include helping Serbia join the European Union and the construction of a motorway linking Bucharest, Sofia and Belgrade.

On 2 November 2018, Prime Minister of Bulgaria Boyko Borisov stated that Prime Minister of Greece Alexis Tsipras proposed joint bid for the 2030 FIFA World Cup by Bulgaria, Romania, Serbia and Greece during the meeting in Thessaloniki.

Since the 2020s, however, the cooperation between the Craiova Group has stalled.

== Current leaders ==
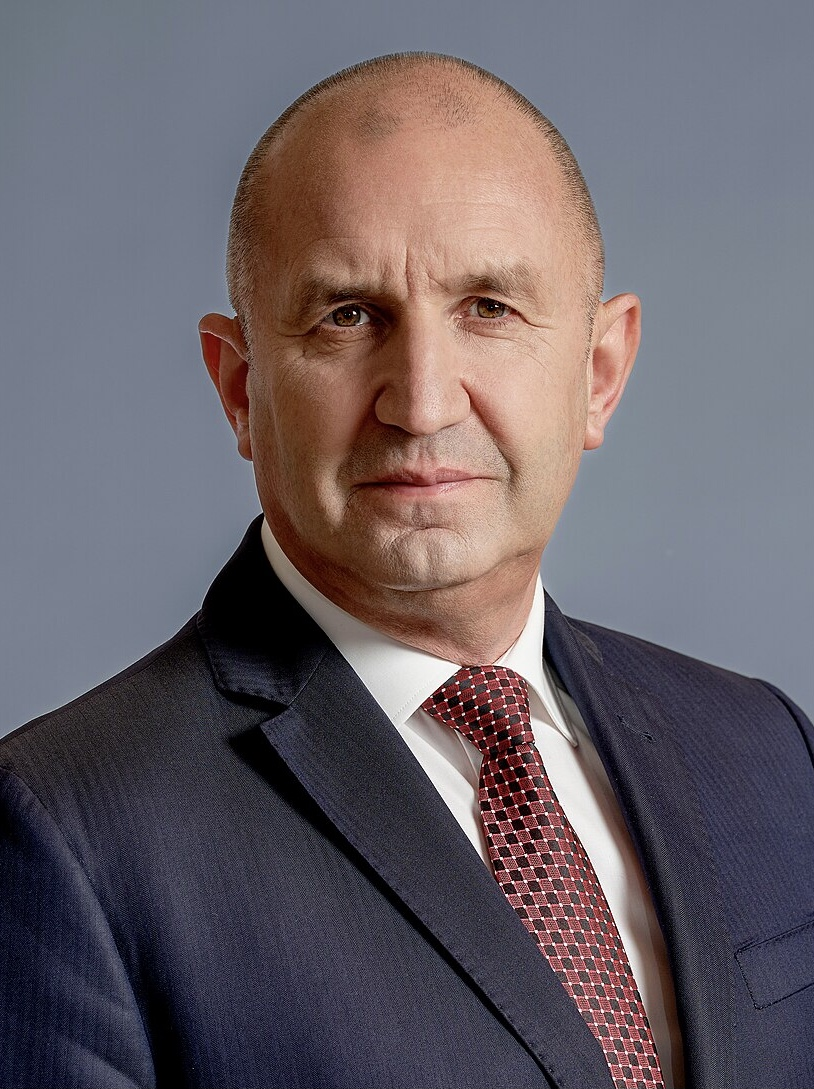
(Bulgaria) Bulgaria
Rumen Radev
Prime Minister

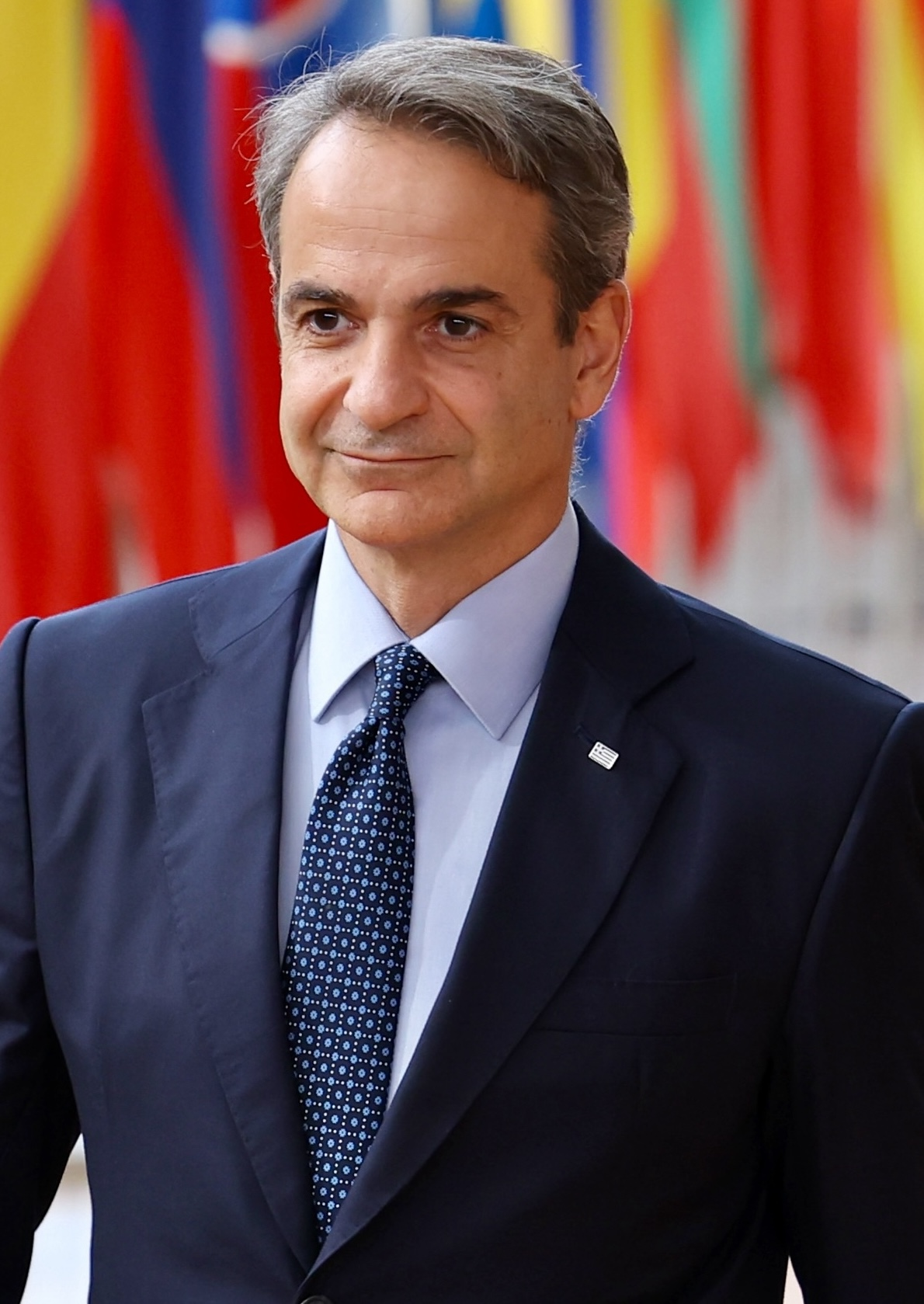
(Greece) Greece
Kyriakos Mitsotakis
Prime Minister

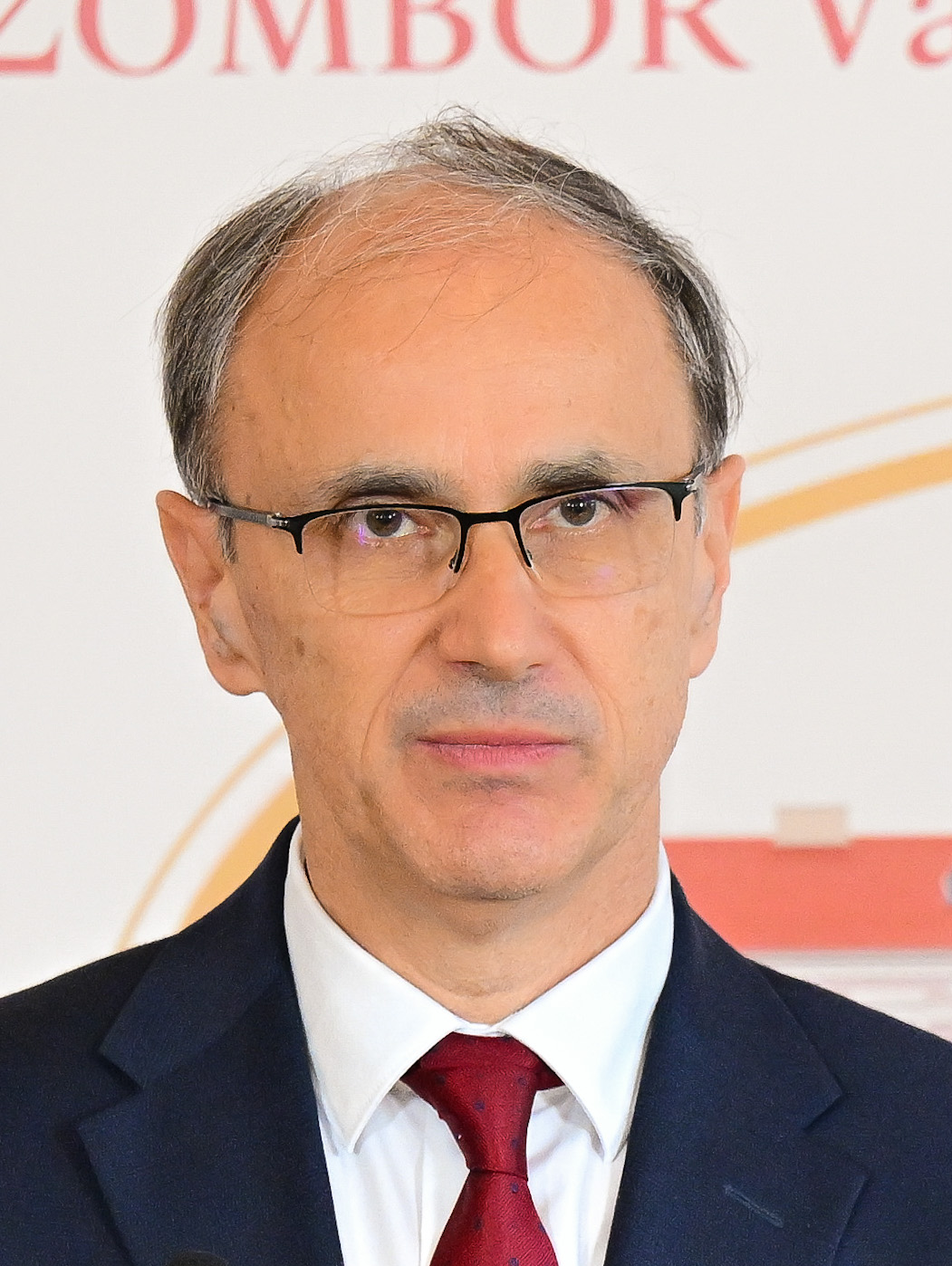
(Serbia) Serbia
Đuro Macut
Prime Minister

(Romania) Romania
Luca Niculescu
Prime Minister

== Country comparison ==
Name	Romania	Bulgaria	Greece	Serbia
Official name	Romania (România)	Republic of Bulgaria (Република България / Republika Bŭlgariya)	Hellenic Republic (Ελληνική Δημοκρατία)	Republic of Serbia (Република Србија / Republika Srbija)
Coat of Arms				
Flag	Romania	Bulgaria	Greece	Serbia
Population	▼19,043,151 (2026)	▼6,423,207 (2026)	▼10,366,586 (2026)	▼6,532,019 (2026)
Area	238,397 km^{2} (92,046 sq mi)	110,993.6 km^{2} (42,854.9 sq mi)	131,957 km^{2} (50,949 sq mi)	77,747 km^{2}(29,913 sq mi)(excluding Kosovo)
Population Density	79.9/km^{2} (206.8/sq mi)	57.8/km^{2} (149.8/sq mi)	78.5/km^{2} (203.5/sq mi)	84.0/km^{2} (218.3/sq mi)
Government	Unitary semi-presidential constitutional republic	Unitary parliamentary constitutional republic	Unitary parliamentary constitutional republic	Unitary parliamentary constitutional republic
Capital	Bucharest – 1,716,961 (2,304,408 metro)	Sofia – 1,248,452 (1,667,314 metro)	Athens – 643,452 (3,638,281 metro)	Belgrade – 1,383,875 (1,681,405 metro)
Largest City	Bucharest – 1,716,961 (2,304,408 metro)	Sofia – 1,248,452 (1,667,314 metro)	Athens – 643,452 (3,638,281 metro)	Belgrade – 1,383,875 (1,681,405 metro)
Official language	Romanian	Bulgarian	Greek	Serbian
First Leader	Alexandru Ioan Cuza, Domnitor of the United Principalities (first ruler of the modern unified state). Burebista, King of Dacia (first leader of the Romanian peoples).	Khan Asparuh of Bulgaria (founder of the First Bulgarian Empire)	Governor Ioannis Kapodistrias (first head of state of the modern independent state)	Prince Višeslav of Serbia (first ruler known by name)
Current Head of Government	Prime Minister Luca Niculescu (Independent)	Prime Minister Rumen Radev (Progressive Bulgaria)	Prime Minister Kyriakos Mitsotakis (New Democracy)	Prime Minister Đuro Macut (Independent)
Current Head of State	President Nicușor Dan (Independent)	President Iliana Iotova (BSP)	President Konstantinos Tasoulas (New Democracy)	President Aleksandar Vučić (SNS)
Main religions	81% Eastern Orthodox, 6.2% Protestant, 5.1% Latin and Greek Catholic, 0.2% irreligious, 1.5% Other religious	59.5% Eastern Orthodox, 9.3% irreligious, 7.9% Islam, 0.9% Protestant, 0.7% Roman Catholic	90% Eastern Orthodox, 3% Other Christians (excluding Catholic), 4% irreligious, 2% Islam, 3% Other religious (including Eastern or Western Catholic)	81.1% Eastern Orthodox, 4.2% Islam, 3.9% Roman Catholic, 1.1% irreligious, 1% Protestant
Ethnic groups	88.9% Romanians, 6.1% Hungarians, 3.3% Roma, 0.2% Ukrainians, 0.2% Germans	84.8% Bulgarians, 8.8% Turks, 4.9% Roma, 0.7% others	Greek 91.6%, Albanian 4.4%, other 4%	80.6% Serbs, 2.8% Hungarians, 2.3% Bosniaks, 2% Roma, 12.3% others
GDP (nominal)	▲$480.834 billion (2026) 38th; ▲$25,693 per capita (2026) 53th	▲$148.121 billion (2026) 62nd; ▲$23,848 per capita (2026) 54th	▲$307.544 billion (2023) 50th; ▲$29,696 per capita (2026) 47th	▲$112.025 billion (2026) 73th; ▲$17,252 per capita (2026) 68th
GDP (PPP)	▲$950.384 billion (2026) 38th; ▲$50,783 per capita (2026) 45th	▲$283.481 billion (2026) 72nd; ▲$45,642 per capita (2026) 55th	▲$488.577 billion (2026) 55th; ▲$47,175 per capita (2026) 49rd	▲$226.376 billion (2026) 79th; ▲$34,863 per capita (2026) 66th
External debt	36.8 % of GDP	20.4 % of GDP	178.2 % of GDP	48.2 % of GDP
Currency	Leu (L) – RON	Euro (€) – EUR	Euro (€) – EUR	Dinar (din) – RSD
Human Development Index	▲0.845 very high 55th; 0.758 high IHDI 43rd	▲0.845 very high 55th; 0.748 high IHDI 52nd	▲0.908 very high 34th; 0.825 very high IHDI 31th	▲0.833 very high 62nd; 0.772 high IHDI 41th

== See also ==
- Accession of Serbia to the European Union
- Bulgaria–Greece–Romania–Serbia UEFA Euro 2028 and 2030 FIFA World Cup bid
- Frugal Four
- Inner Six
- Nordic Defence Cooperation

=== Other groups in Southeastern Europe ===
- Bucharest Nine
- Central European Defence Cooperation
- Central European Initiative
- Salzburg Forum
- Three Seas Initiative

=== Similar groups ===
- Association Trio
- Commonwealth of Independent States
- Visegrád Group
- EU Med Group
- Lublin Triangle
- Nordic Defence Cooperation
- Nordic-Baltic Eight
- Weimar Triangle
- Open Balkan

=== Other ===
- Comecon
- Eastern Bloc
- Group of Nine
- Pact of Free Cities
- Soviet Union
- Warsaw Pact
- Intermarium (region)
