= Visegrád Group =

Cultural and political alliance in Europe

(in state languages)
Czech	Visegrádská skupina
Hungarian	Visegrádi Együttműködés
Polish	Grupa Wyszehradzka
Slovak	Vyšehradská skupina
- The group's logo, representing the relative positions of the four member states' capitals

- Visegrád Group members Other member states of the European Union
- Membership: Czech Republic; Hungary; Poland; Slovakia

Leaders
  - Rotating presidency: Hungary
- Establishment: 15 February 1991

Area
  - Total: 533,616 km^{2} (206,030 sq mi) (49th)

Population
  - 2025 estimate: ▼62,365,948 (25th)
  - Density: 117/km^{2} (303.0/sq mi)
- GDP (PPP): 2026 estimate
  - Total: ▲$3.63 trillion (13th)
  - Per capita: ▲$57,245 (41th)
- GDP (nominal): 2026 estimate
  - Total: ▲$1.99 trillion (16th)
  - Per capita: ▲$31,447 (42th)
- HDI (2023): 0.900 very high
- Website www.visegradgroup.eu

The Visegrád Group (also known as the Visegrád Four or the V4) is a cultural and political alliance of four Central European countries: the Czech Republic, Hungary, Poland, and Slovakia. The alliance aims to advance co-operation in military, economic, cultural and energy affairs. All four nations are also members of the European Union, the North Atlantic Treaty Organization, and the Three Seas Initiative.

The alliance traces its origins to the summit meetings of leaders of Czechoslovakia, Hungary and Poland, held in the Hungarian castle town of Visegrád on 15 February 1991. Visegrád was chosen as the location for the summits as an intentional allusion to the medieval Congress of Visegrád between John I of Bohemia, Charles I of Hungary, and Casimir III of Poland in 1335.

After the dissolution of Czechoslovakia in 1993, the Czech Republic and Slovakia became independent members of the alliance, increasing the number of members from three to four. All four members of the Visegrád Group joined the European Union on 1 May 2004, achieving its main goal.

During the 2015 European migrant crisis, the Visegrád Group jointly opposed an EU-wide refugee relocation mechanism and, after its adoption, increasingly used asylum policy as a common area of political mobilization while resisting mandatory refugee quotas and broader reforms of the EU asylum system.

The Visegrad Four became politically split due to changes in governments and diverging reactions to the Russian invasion of Ukraine in 2022. Yet its role in fostering exchange among countries' public servants and civil societies (Visegrad Fund) remains significant.

== History ==
=== Background (1335–1989) ===
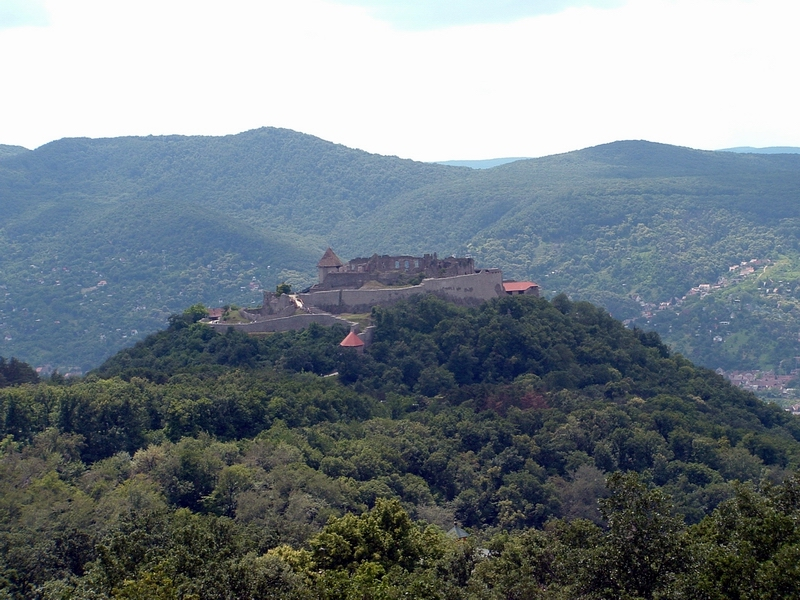
The Castle of Visegrád, where the 1335 and 1339 Congresses of Visegrád took place

The name of the Visegrád Group references the place of meeting selected for the 1335 Congress of Visegrád held by the Bohemian (Czech), Polish, and Hungarian rulers in Visegrád. Charles I of Hungary, Casimir III of Poland, and John I of Bohemia agreed to create new commercial routes to bypass the city of Vienna (a staple port, which required goods to be offloaded and offered for sale in the city before they could be sold elsewhere) and to obtain easier access to other European markets. The recognition of Czech sovereignty over the Duchy of Silesia was also confirmed. The second Congress of Visegrád took place in 1339 and decided that if Casimir III of Poland died without a son (as actually happened in 1370), then the son of Charles I of Hungary, Louis I of Hungary would become the King of Poland.

From the 16th century, large parts of the present-day territories of the group's members became part of, or were influenced, by the Vienna-based Habsburg monarchy. This situation continued until the end of World War I and the dissolution of Habsburg-ruled Austria-Hungary in 1918. In the three years after the end of World War II in 1945 the countries became satellite states of the Soviet Union, as the Polish People's Republic, the Hungarian People's Republic and the Czechoslovak Socialist Republic. In 1989, the fall of the Berlin Wall and the fall of communism in central and eastern Europe enabled Poland, Hungary and Czechoslovakia to adopt capitalism and democracy. In December 1991, the fall of the Soviet Union occurred, further allowing the three countries to look westward.

=== Establishment (1990s) ===
The Visegrád Group was established on 15 February 1991 at a meeting between the President of the Czech and Slovak Federative Republic, Václav Havel, the President of the Republic of Poland, Lech Wałęsa, and the Prime Minister of the Republic of Hungary, József Antall, in the Hungarian town of Visegrád. The group was created with the aim of moving away from communism and implementing the reforms required for full membership of the Euro-Atlantic institutions, such as NATO and the EU.

After the dissolution of Czechoslovakia in 1993, the Czech Republic and Slovakia became independent members of the alliance, raising the number of members from three to four. All four members of the Visegrád Group joined the European Union on 1 May 2004.

=== Contemporary history (2004–present) ===
With all four Visegrad countries joining the EU in 2004, the primary goal of the group was achieved. Since then, the Visegrad Group has focused mostly on cultural cooperation through the Visegrad Fund and expert-level cooperation on topics such as infrastructure. The group became politically active and media visible during the European Migration Crisis in 2015. The Visegrad countries forcefully fought against the EU quota that aimed to distribute Syrian refugees from the overwhelmed southern EU countries across the continent. The coherence of the group decreased with the lower salience of migration in the subsequent years.

The full-scale invasion of Ukraine by Russia in 2022 caused a rift within the group. The Hungarian government under Viktor Orbán and the Slovak government under Robert Fico rejected support for Ukraine and echoed Russian claims that the war had been provoked by NATO. On the other hand, the Czech government under Petr Fiala and the Polish government under Donald Tusk are among the strongest supporters of Ukraine. This rift was highlighted by the summit in Prague in 2024, where Fiala said it "wouldn't make sense that we differ in the views of the cause of the Russian aggression against Ukraine and the ways of solving it." Polish Foreign Minister Radosław Sikorski also stressed that the priority for Poland (the largest country in the group) should be collaboration within the Weimar Triangle (Poland, Germany, France) and with the US, rather than with the Visegrad Four.

While some Czech politicians even called for leaving the Visegrad Four, Vít Dostál, head of the foreign policy think-tank AMO, argued that the V4 survived many governments with differing foreign policy priorities. He highlighted V4's crucial role in networking among public servants (down to the level of ministerial experts), which helps the four countries in EU negotiations - as well as networking among civil society actors.

== Economies ==
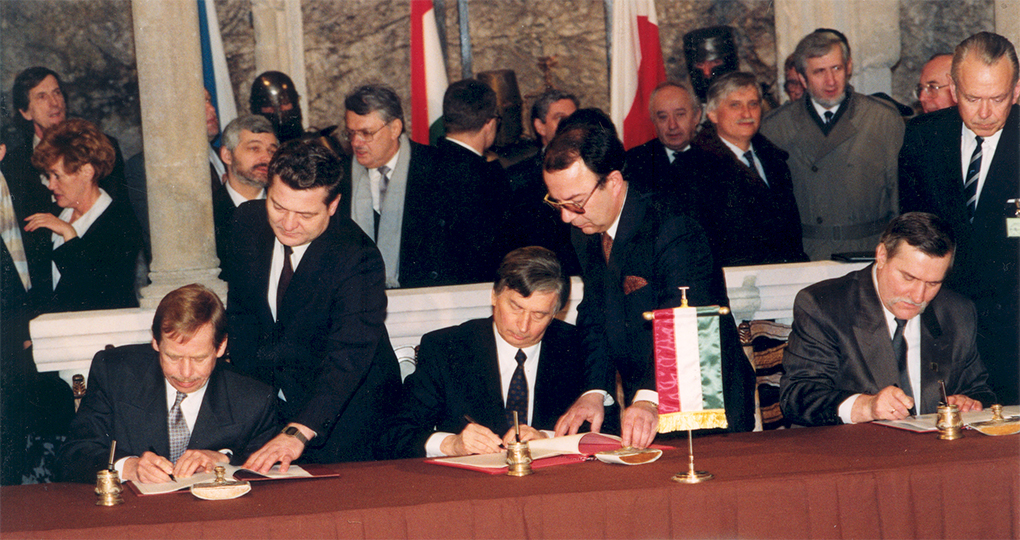
The Visegrád Group signing ceremony in February 1991

The transition from central planning to market economies was one of the founding goals of Visegrád cooperation in 1991. The founding governments also sought closer ties with Western Europe after communist rule ended in 1989. Economic output initially fell during the 1990s, before recovering at different speeds across the region.

Western European companies invested in factories in the region, and acquired existing manufacturers, producing surplus for export. The region became a manufacturing base for German carmakers and their suppliers. Political scientist Visnja Vukov argues that governments encouraged foreign investment to preserve their industrial base, accepting dependence on foreign ownership. She contrasts this approach with greater reliance on borrowing and domestic consumption in Southern Europe.

Slovakia has been the first and the only country of the block that adopted the euro. The other three members still use their own currencies. They are obliged to adopt the euro once they meet the convergence criteria, but the EU treaties set no deadline.

The Visegrád Group reached a combined gross domestic product (GDP) of $3.38 trillion at PPP, representing 11.4% of the EU total. If counted as a single economy, in 2025 they would rank fourth in the EU, behind Germany, France and Italy. Their combined nominal GDP was €1.63 trillion.

The Czech Republic had the highest GDP per capita in the group when adjusted for price differences, at 92% of the EU average. Poland followed at 81%, Hungary at 76% and Slovakia at 75%.

=== Energy ===
Nuclear power accounts for a large share of electricity production in Czechia, Hungary and Slovakia. In 2024, it supplied 61.6% of Slovakia's electricity and around 40% in Czechia and Hungary. Poland, which has no operating nuclear power plants, generated 51% of its electricity from coal in 2025. Renewable electricity generation has expanded unevenly across the region, particularly through solar power in Hungary and Poland.

Czechia, Hungary and Slovakia plan to expand their existing nuclear generating capacity, while Poland is developing its first nuclear power plant. The Visegrád countries have also jointly advocated greater support for nuclear energy within the EU, particularly in access to financing. In October 2026, V4 energy ministers urged the EU to give nuclear power the same support as renewables, particularly when financing new reactors.

=== Automotive industry ===
All four countries manufacture vehicles and have large networks of automotive parts suppliers. These supply local assembly plants and export to Germany and other markets. In 2024, manufacturers of automotive parts and components employed about 398,000 people across the four countries and had a turnover of €97.4 billion. Both totals were higher than in any single EU member state, accounting for around a third of EU employment and turnover in the sector.

Alongside manufacturing, automotive companies also carry out research and development in the region, including work on electric powertrains, vehicle electronics and software for advanced driver-assistance systems.

In the Czech Republic, Porsche Engineering develops automotive software and electronics at its offices in Prague and Ostrava, including technologies for electric vehicles and driver assistance. In Hungary, Bosch and Aumovio develop driver-assistance technologies. In Slovakia, ZF develops components for hybrid and electric powertrains.

=== Information technology ===
The Visegrád countries host numerous centres for software development, serving businesses worldwide. Multinational companies operating in the sector include Accenture, Capgemini, Kyndryl, IBM, SAP, Oracle and Microsoft.

=== Czech Republic ===
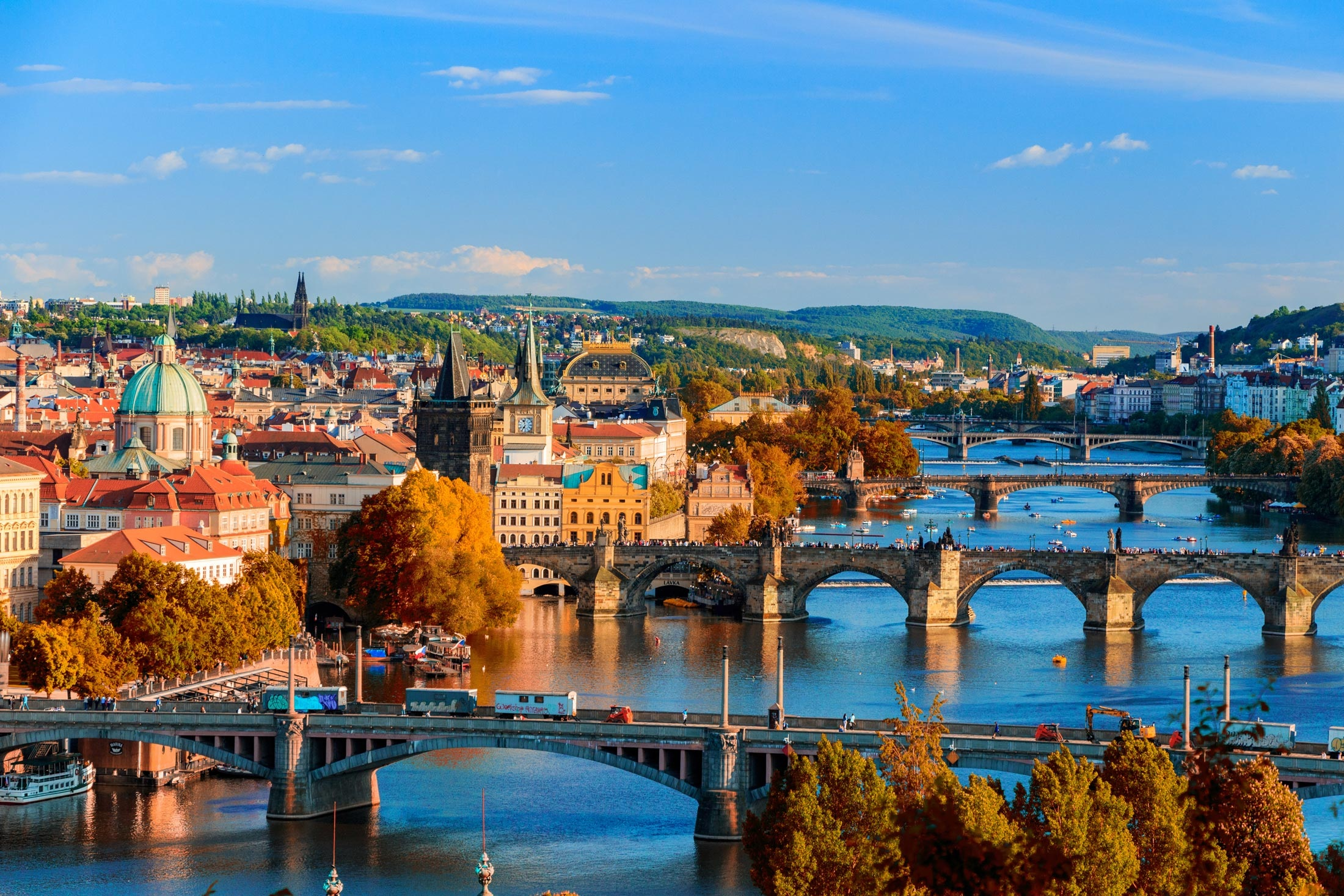
Prague, Czech Republic

Czechia has the second-largest economy in the Visegrád Group by total GDP and the highest GDP per capita at purchasing power parity. Services accounted for 65% of gross value added in 2023, while industry and construction contributed 33%. Germany is the country's largest export market, accounting for 32% of its goods exports in 2025.

The automotive industry is the country's largest manufacturing sector, led by carmakers Škoda Auto, Hyundai and Toyota. Škoda Group and AŽD Praha are major suppliers of railway vehicles and equipment. Other businesses include the energy groups ČEZ and EPH, defence and engineering group Czechoslovak Group and hospital bed manufacturer LINET.

Software and internet companies include Seznam.cz, enterprise software developer Seyfor, cybersecurity firm Avast and game developer Warhorse Studios. Brno is a centre for electron microscopy with manufacturers TESCAN and Thermo Fisher Scientific. Around one-third of the world's electron microscopes are made in the city.

=== Hungary ===
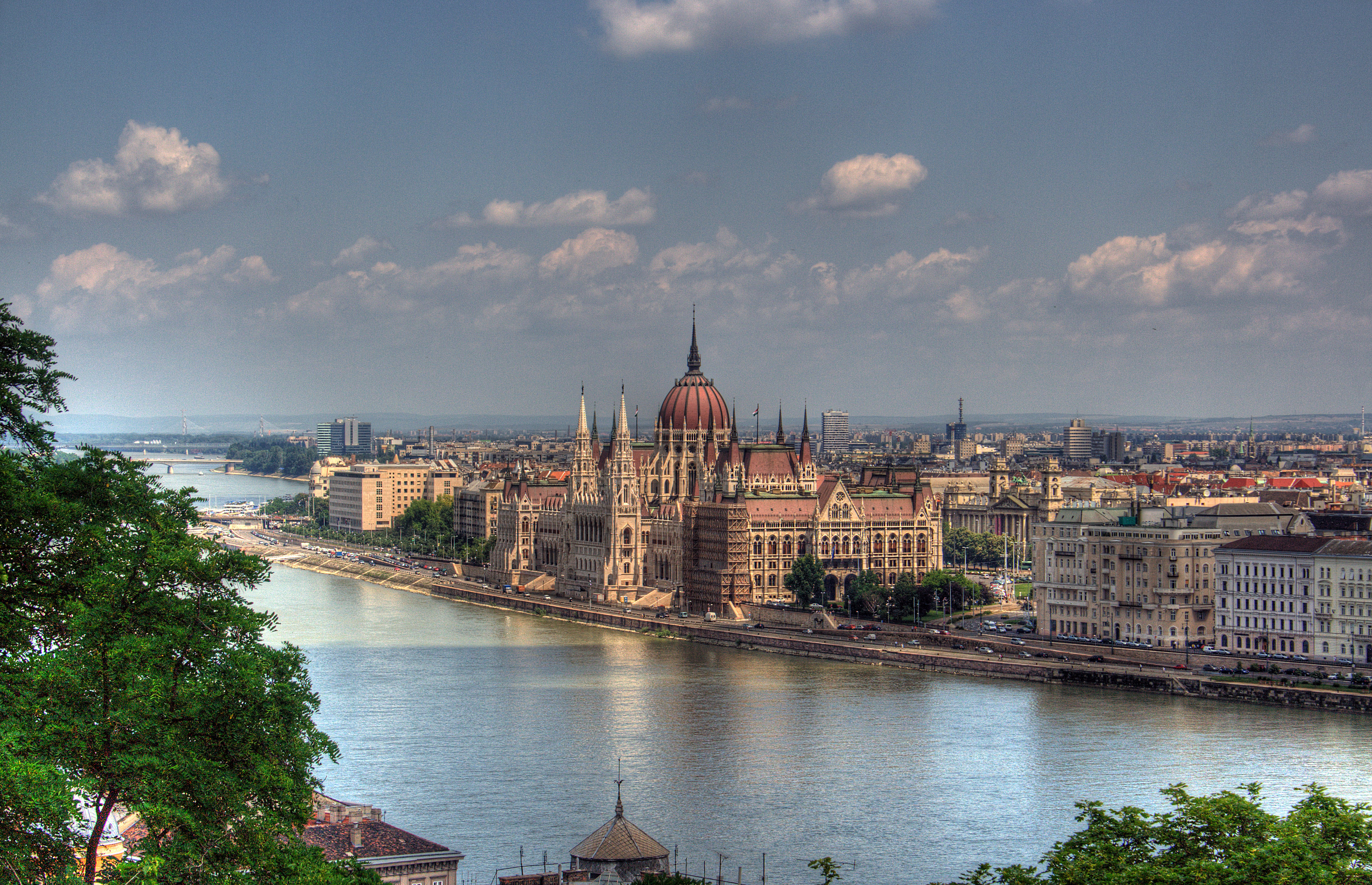
Budapest, Hungary

Hungary has the third-largest economy of the Visegrád group. Services accounted for about 70% of its gross value added in 2024, followed by industry and construction at 27%. Major industries include automotive manufacturing, electronics, machinery, pharmaceuticals and food processing.

Foreign investment has played an important role in Hungary's economy since the transition to a market economy. Audi, Mercedes-Benz, Suzuki and BMW operate manufacturing plants in the country, while Chinese and South Korean companies have invested heavily in battery production. Hungary also has an established pharmaceutical industry, with domestic companies such as Gedeon Richter and Egis. Tourism is another important sector, particularly in Budapest and around Lake Balaton.

=== Poland ===
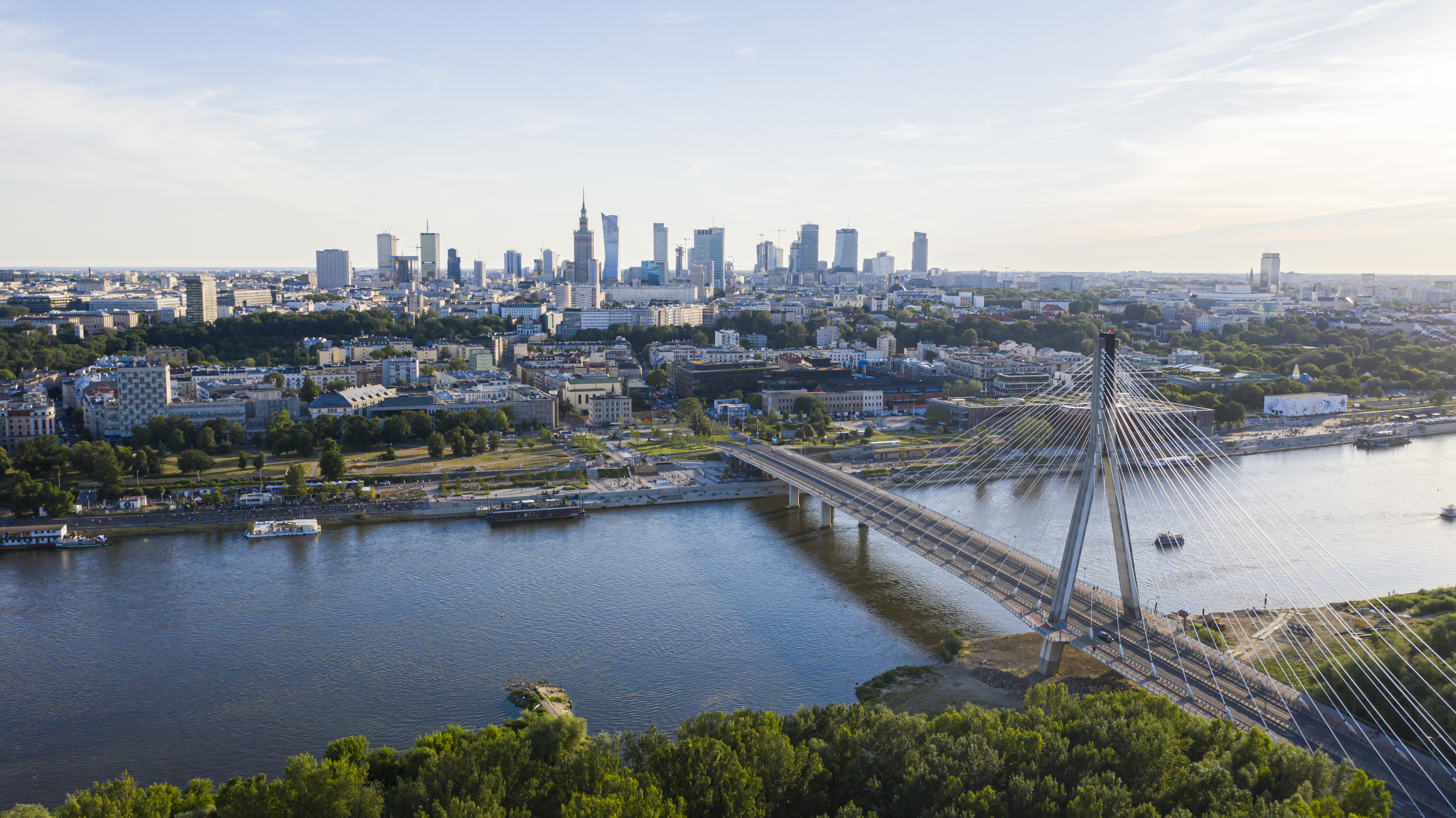
Warsaw, Poland

Poland has the largest economy and domestic market of the Visegrád countries. Services accounted for 65% of its gross value added in 2023, followed by industry and construction at 32%. Major industries include automotive manufacturing, machinery, electronics, chemicals, food processing and furniture production.

Poland has experienced substantial economic growth since its transition to a market economy. It was the only European Union member to avoid a recession during the financial crisis of 2008–2009. Foreign investment and EU funding have contributed to the development of its industries and infrastructure. Germany remains its largest export market.

Poland is home to several major companies, including the energy group Orlen, copper producer KGHM and software company Asseco. Its technology and services sectors also include CD Projekt, known for video games, the e-commerce platform Allegro and parcel delivery company InPost.

=== Slovakia ===
Bratislava, Slovakia

Slovakia has the smallest economy of the Visegrád countries. Services account for about two-thirds of its economic output, while industry and construction contribute about one-third.

Slovakia is the world's largest producer of cars per capita, with major factories operated by Volkswagen, Kia, Stellantis and Jaguar Land Rover. Transport equipment accounts for more than a third of its merchandise exports.

The service sector includes IT and business service centres operated by international companies such as IBM and Amazon. Slovakia is also home to software companies including ESET and Sygic.

== Demographics ==
At the start of 2026, the Visegrád countries had a population of about 62.1 million, with 36.3 million in Poland, 10.9 million in Czechia, 9.5 million in Hungary and 5.4 million in Slovakia. All four countries experienced natural population decline in 2025, but immigration helped counter this trend. Czechia was the only member to record overall population growth.

Following the Russian invasion of Ukraine, many Ukrainians fled to the Visegrád countries. At the end of August 2026, around 940,000 people displaced from Ukraine had temporary protection in Poland, while 400,000 had the same status in Czechia. Relative to their populations, Czechia and Slovakia had the highest numbers of displaced Ukrainians in the EU.

Future population trends will depend partly on continued immigration, the return of citizens living abroad and whether Ukrainians displaced by the war remain in the region or return home.

=== V4 capitals ===
- Warsaw (Poland) – 1,790,658 inhabitants (metro – 3,105,883)
- Budapest (Hungary) – 1,779,361 inhabitants (metro – 3,303,786)
- Prague (Czech Republic) – 1,318,688 inhabitants (metro – 2,647,308)
- Bratislava (Slovakia) – 432,801 inhabitants (metro – 659,578)

== Current leaders ==
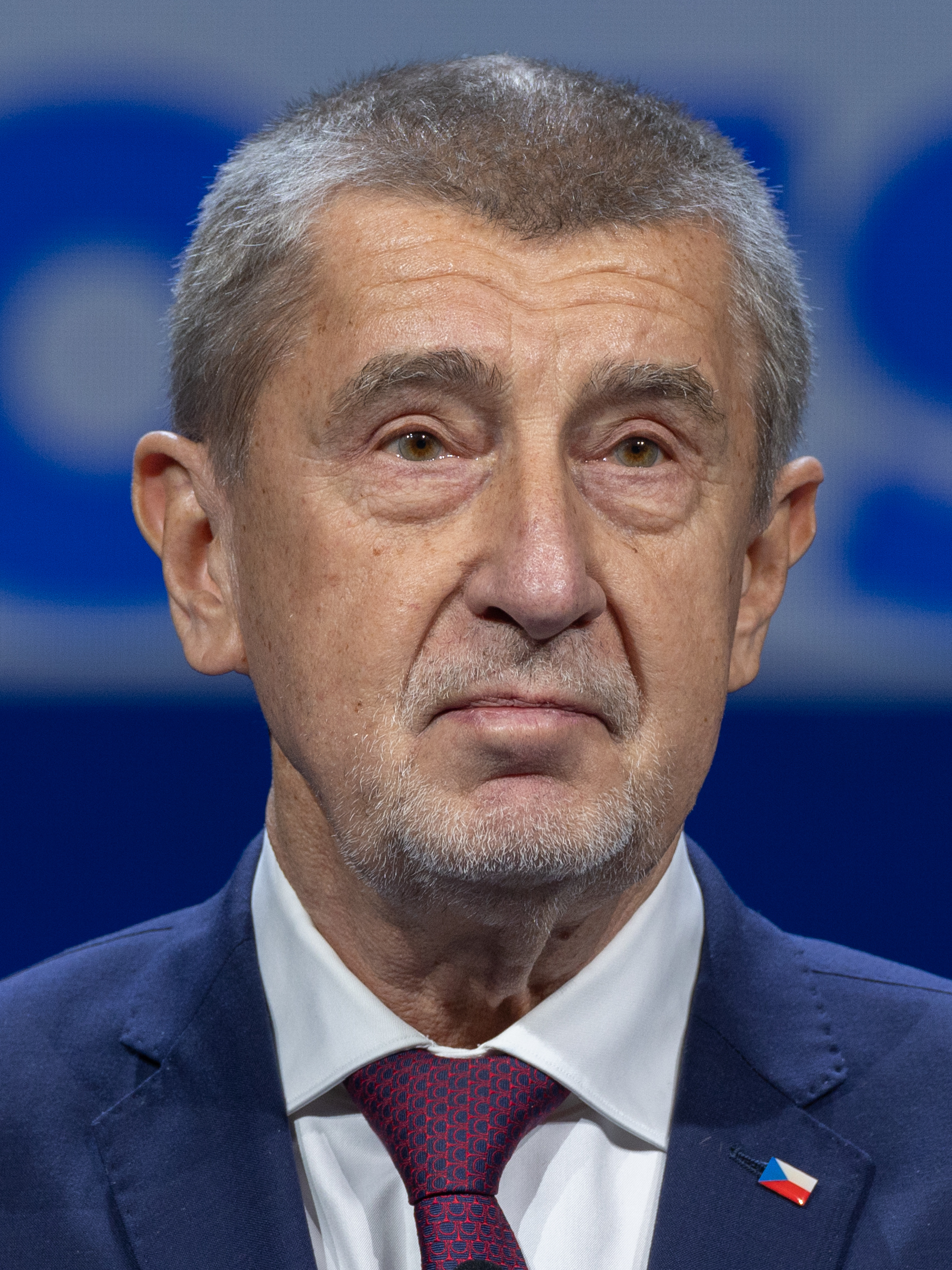
(Czech Republic) Czech Republic
Andrej Babiš
Prime Minister

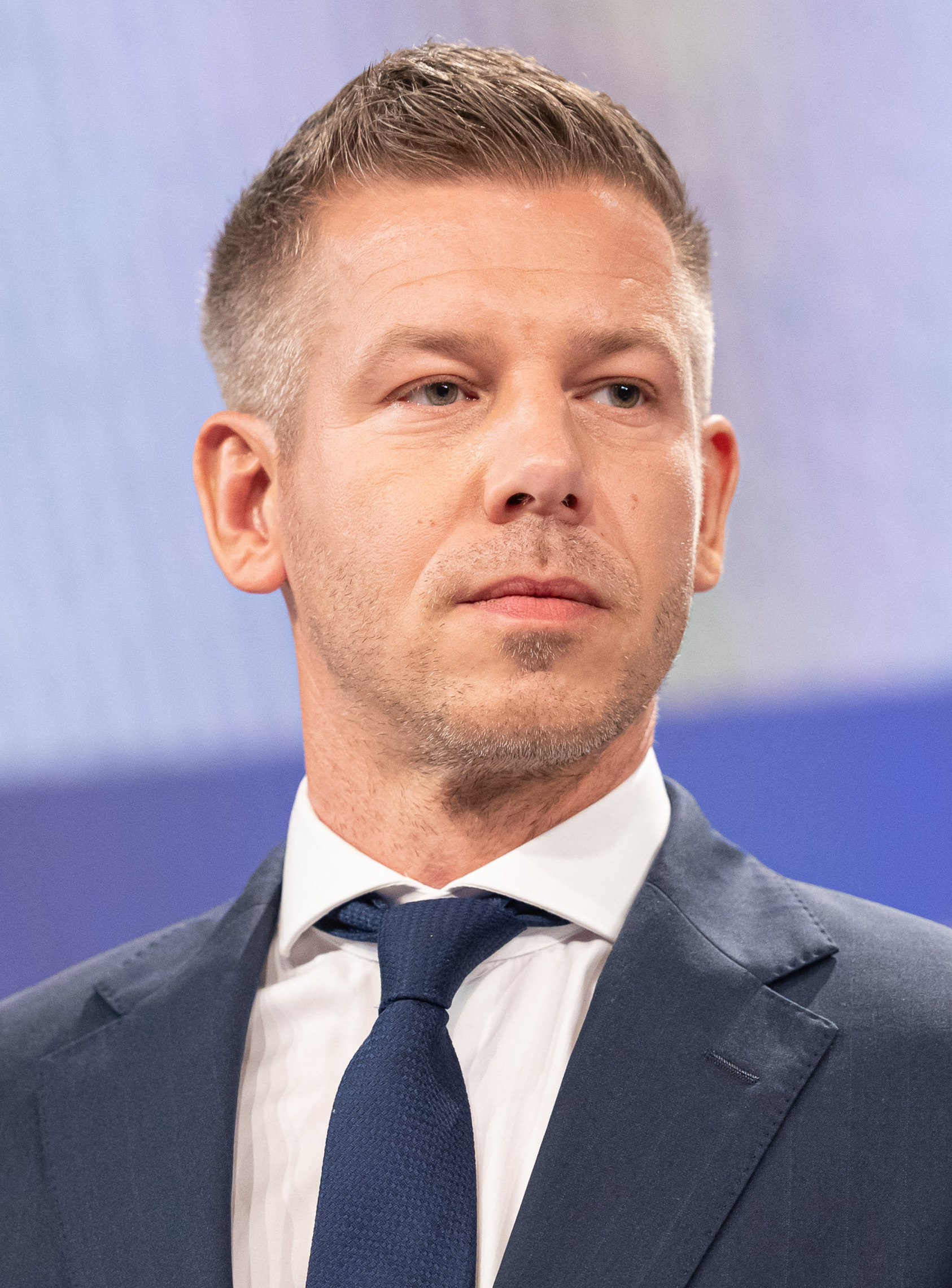
(Hungary) Hungary
Péter Magyar
Prime Minister

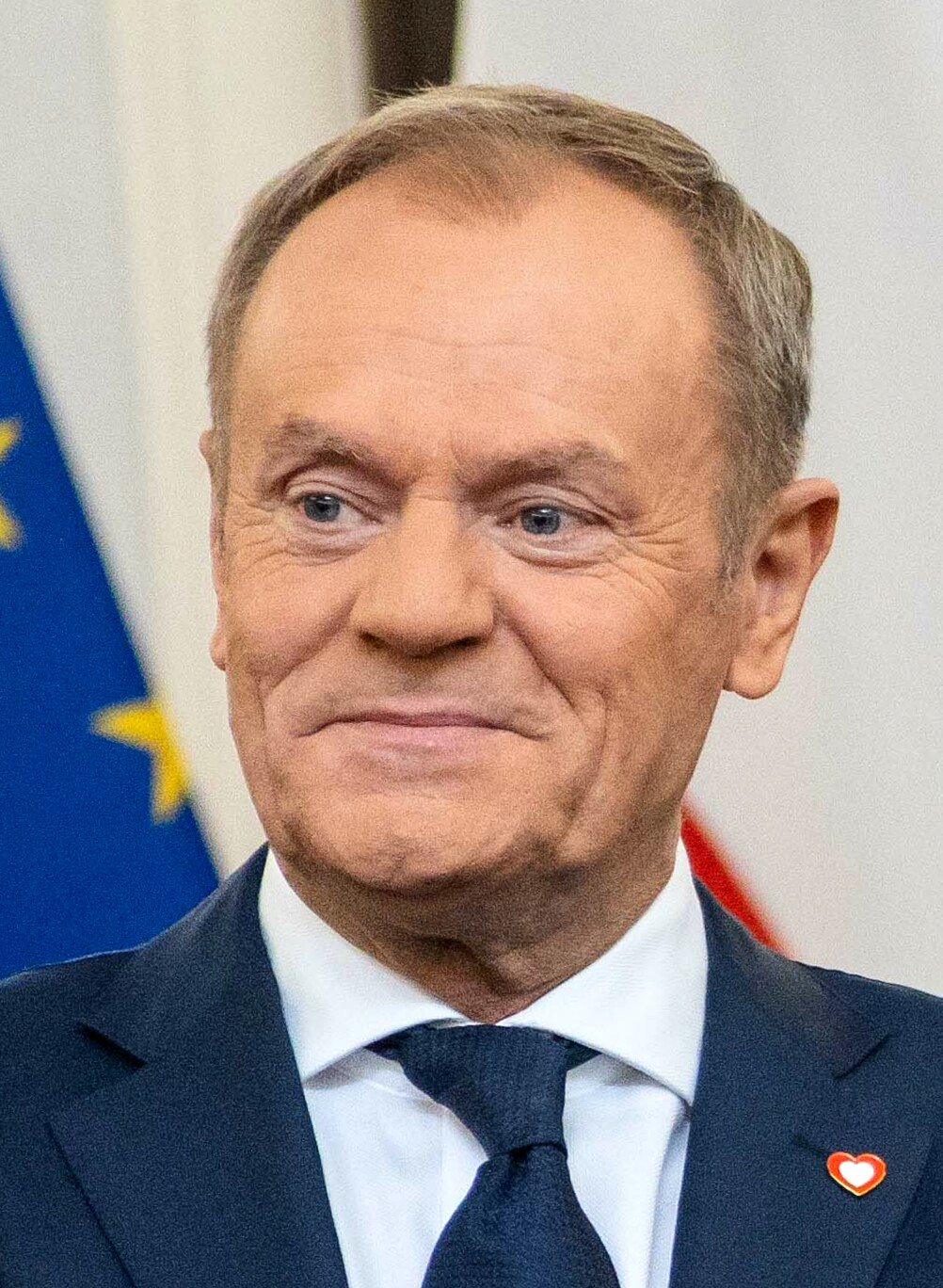
(Poland) Poland
Donald Tusk
Prime Minister

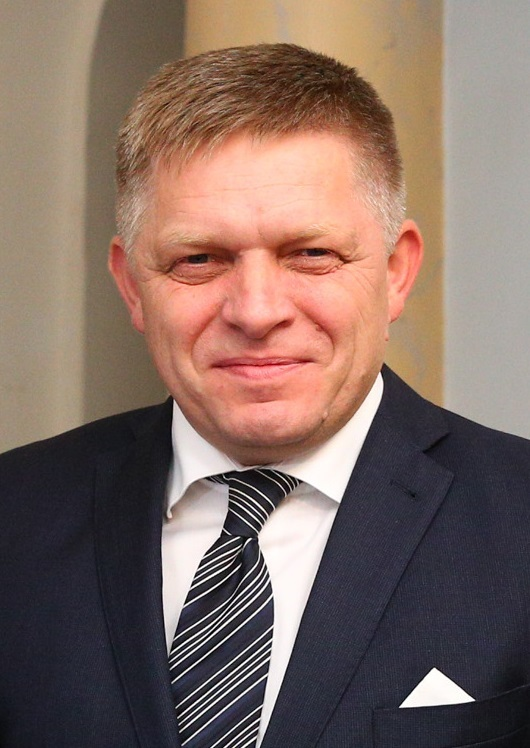
(Slovakia) Slovakia
Robert Fico
Prime Minister

== Initiatives ==
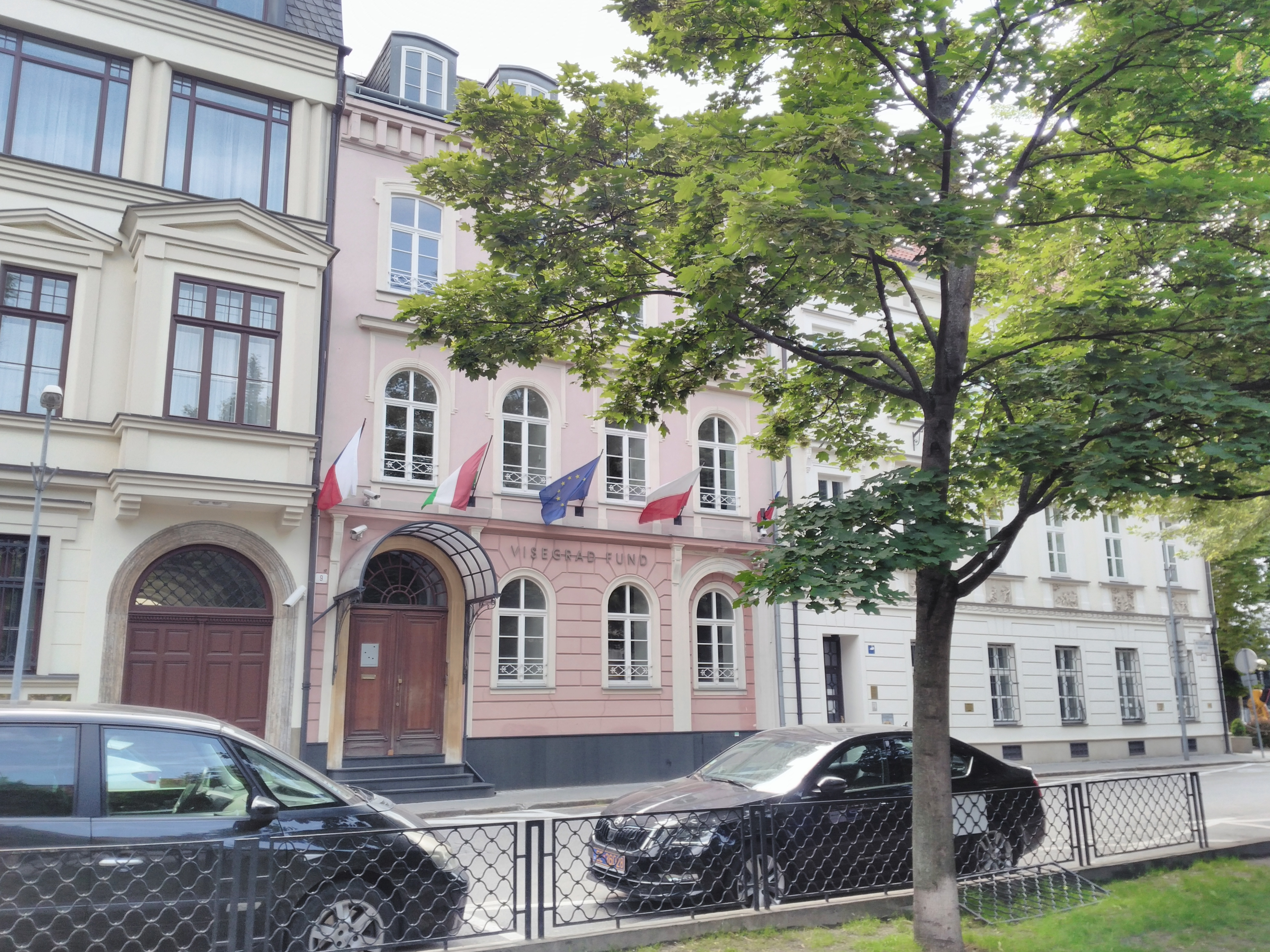
Visegrád Fund building in Bratislava

=== International Visegrád Fund ===
The International Visegrád Fund (IVF) is the only institutionalized form of regional cooperation of the Visegrád Group countries.

The main aim of the fund is to strengthen the ties among people and institutions in Central and Eastern Europe through giving support to regional non-governmental initiatives.

=== Defence cooperation ===
==== Visegrád Battlegroup ====
On 12 May 2011, Polish Defence Minister Bogdan Klich said that Poland will lead a new EU Battlegroup of the Visegrád Group. The decision was made at the V4 defence ministers' meeting in Levoča, Slovakia, and the battlegroup became operational and was placed on standby in the first half of 2016. The ministers also agreed that the V4 militaries should hold regular exercises under the auspices of the NATO Response Force, with the first such exercise to be held in Poland in 2013. The battlegroup included members of V4 and Ukraine. Another V4 EU Battlegroup was formed in the second semester of 2019 (V4 + Croatia) and another will be on standby in the first semester of 2023.

==== Other cooperation areas ====
On 14 March 2014, in response to the 2014 Russian military intervention in Ukraine, a pact was signed for a joint military body within the European Union. Subsequent Action Plan defines these other cooperation areas:

- Defence Planning
- Joint Training and Exercises
- Joint Procurement and Defence Industry
- Military Education
- Joint Airspace Protection
- Coordination of Positions
- Communication Strategy

V4 Joint Logistics Support Group Headquarters (V4 JLSG HQ) was established in 2020 and will reach the full operational capability by the beginning of 2023.

=== Visegrád Patent Institute ===
Created by an agreement signed in Bratislava on 26 February 2015, the Institute aims at operating as an International Searching Authority (ISA) and International Preliminary Examining Authorities (IPEA) under the Patent Cooperation Treaty (PCT) as from 1 July 2016.

== Neighbour relations ==
=== European Union ===
All members of the V4 have been member states of the European Union since the EU's enlargement in 2004, and members of the Schengen Area since 2007.

==== Austria ====
The countries participating in the Austerlitz format. From north to south: Czech Republic, Slovakia, Austria.

Austria is the Visegrád Group's southwestern neighbor. The Czech Republic, Slovakia and Austria launched the Slavkov format for the three countries in early 2015. The first meeting in this format took place on 29 January 2015 in Slavkov u Brna in the Czech Republic. Petr Drulák, the deputy foreign minister of the Czech Republic, emphasized that the Slavkov format was not a competitor, but an addition to the Visegrád group, after proposals to enlarge the V4 with Austria and Slovenia were rejected by Hungary.

The leadership of the Freedom Party of Austria, the junior partner in the former Austrian coalition government, has expressed its willingness to closely cooperate with the Visegrád Group. Former Chancellor and leader of the Austrian People's Party Sebastian Kurz wanted to act as a bridge builder between the east and the west.

==== Germany ====
Germany is one of the Visegrád Group's main trading partners. The four countries have close ties to German manufacturing, particularly in the automotive industry.

In 2025, trade between Germany and the V4 totalled approximately €400 billion, comprising €202 billion in German exports and €198 billion in imports. Together, the four countries accounted for nearly 13% of German goods exports, making them a larger export market than any individual country.

==== Romania ====
On 24 April 2015, Bulgaria, Romania and Serbia established the Craiova Group. The idea came from Victor Ponta, the then Romanian Prime Minister, who said he was inspired by the Visegrád Group. Greece joined the group in October 2017.

Romania has been invited to participate in the Visegrád Group on previous occasions.

=== Non-EU ===
Hungary, Poland, and Slovakia border Ukraine on their east. Poland additionally borders Belarus and Russia's Kaliningrad Oblast to the northeast. The Czech Republic is fully surrounded by other EU members. Hungary borders Serbia, a candidate for EU accession, in the south.

==== Ukraine ====
Ukraine, an eastern neighbour of the V4 that is not a member of the EU, is one of largest recipients of the International Visegrád Fund support and receives assistance from the Visegrád Group for its aspirations to European integration. Ukraine joined the Deep and Comprehensive Free Trade Area with the EU and therefore with the V4 in 2016.

The 2022 Russian invasion of Ukraine has led to tensions within the Visegrád Group with Hungary under Viktor Orban, opposed to harsher sanctions against Russia, while the Czech Republic, Slovakia, and Poland strongly supporting Ukraine. In November 2022, Czech Prime Minister Petr Fiala stated, “This is not the best of times for the (Visegrád) format, and Hungary's different attitudes are significantly influencing and complicating the situation.”

Since Robert Fico return to office in 2023 in Slovakia, Hungary and Slovakia have forged a strong strategic and ideological partnership, characterized by shared opposition to the European Union's stance on migration and military aid to Ukraine. This close alignment has positioned Slovakia as a key ally for Hungary in Brussels, with Fico publicly stating that the "sovereign positions of Hungary and Slovakia would be suitable for a significant strengthening of cooperation within the Visegrad Four".

== Country comparison ==
Name	Czech Republic (Česká republika)	Hungary (Magyarország)	Poland	Slovakia
Official name	Czech Republic (Česká republika)	Hungary (Magyarország)	Republic of Poland (Rzeczpospolita Polska)	Slovak Republic (Slovenská republika)
Coat of arms				
Flag	Czech Republic	Hungary	Poland	Slovakia
Population	▲10,649,800 (2019)	▼9,772,756 (2019)	▼37,972,812 (2019)	▲5,450,421 (2019)
Area	78,866 km^{2} (30,450 sq mi)	93,028 km^{2} (35,918 sq mi)	312,696 km^{2} (120,733 sq mi)	49,035 km^{2} (18,933 sq mi)
Population Density	134/km^{2} (350/mi^{2})	105.9/km^{2} (274/mi^{2})	123/km^{2} (320/mi^{2})	111/km^{2} (290/mi^{2})
Government	Unitary parliamentary constitutional republic	Unitary parliamentary constitutional republic	Unitary parliamentary constitutional republic	Unitary parliamentary constitutional republic
Capital	Prague – 1,318,688 (2,647,308 Metro)	Budapest – 1,779,361 (3,303,786 Metro)	Warsaw – 1,783,321 (3,100,844 Metro)	Bratislava – 429,564 (659,578 Metro)
Largest City	Prague – 1,318,688 (2,647,308 Metro)	Budapest – 1,779,361 (3,303,786 Metro)	Warsaw – 1,783,321 (3,100,844 Metro)	Bratislava – 429,564 (659,578 Metro)
Official language	Czech (de facto and de jure)	Hungarian (de facto and de jure)	Polish (de facto and de jure)	Slovak (de facto and de jure)
First Leader	Bořivoj I, Duke of Bohemia (first historically documented Duke of Bohemia, 867–889)	Grand Prince Árpád (traditional first leader of tribal principality, 895–907) King St. Stephen (of Christian kingdom, 997–1038)	Duke Mieszko I (traditional first leader of unified state, 960–992)	Pribina (traditional ancestor, ?–861)
Current Head of Government	Prime Minister Andrej Babiš (ANO 2011; 2017–2021, since 2025)	Prime Minister Péter Magyar (TISZA; since 2026)	Prime Minister Donald Tusk (Civic Platform; 2007–2014, since 2023)	Prime Minister Robert Fico (Smer; 2006–2010, 2012–2018, since 2023)
Current Head of State	President Petr Pavel (independent; since 2023)	President András Baka (independent; since 2026)	President Karol Nawrocki (independent; since 2025)	President Peter Pellegrini (independent; since 2024)
Main religions	44.7% undeclared, 34.5% irreligious, 10.5% Roman Catholic, 2% other Christians, 0.7% others	38.9% Catholicism (Roman, Greek), 13.8% Protestantism (Reformed, Evangelical), 0.2% Orthodox, 0.1% Jewish, 1.7% other, 16.7% Non-religious, 1.5% Atheism, 27.2% undeclared	71.3% Roman Catholic, 20.6% Unanswered, 0.1% Other faiths, 2.41% Irreligious, 6.9% Not stated	62% Roman Catholic, 5.9% Evangelical Church of the Augsburg Confession in Slovakia, 3.8% Slovak Greek Catholic Church, 1.8% Reformed churches, 0.9% Czech and Slovak Orthodox Church, 0.3% Jehovah's Witnesses, 0.2% Evangelical Methodist, 10.6% not specified, 13.4% no religion
Ethnic groups	64.3% Czechs, 25.3% unspecified, 5% Moravians, 1.4% Slovaks, 1.0% Ukrainians, 3.0% Other	83.7% Hungarian, 3.1% Roma, 1.3% German, 14.7% not declared	98% Poles, 2% other or undeclared	80.7% Slovaks, 8.5% Hungarians, 2.0% Roma, 0.6% Czechs, 0.6% Rusyns, 0.1% Ukrainians, 0.1% Germans, 0.1% Poles, 0.1% Moravians, 7.2% unspecified
GDP (nominal)	▲$245.226 billion (2018) (45th); ▲$23,113 per capita (2018) (36th)	▲$161.182 billion (2018) (54th); ▲$16,484 per capita (2018) (47th)	▲$585.816 billion (2018) (21st); ▲$15,426 per capita (2018) (56th)	▲$106.573 billion (2018) (60th); ▲$19,579 per capita (2018) (40th)
External debt (nominal)	$77.786 billion (2019 Q2) – 31.6 % of GDP	$112.407 billion (2019 Q2) – 66.6 % of GDP	$281.812 billion (2019 Q2) – 47.5 % of GDP	$51.524 billion (2019 Q2) – 46.9 % of GDP
GDP (PPP)	▲$396.176 billion (2018) (45th); ▲$37,340 per capita (2018) (34th)	▲$312.052 billion (2018) (53rd); ▲$31,914 per capita (2018) (40th)	▲$1.215 trillion (2018) (23rd); ▲$32,005 per capita (2018) (41st)	▲$191.252 billion (2018) (68th); ▲$35,136 per capita (2018) (38th)
Currency	Czech koruna (Kč) – CZK	Hungarian forint (Ft) – HUF	Polish złoty (zł) – PLN	Euro (€) – EUR
Human Development Index	0.915 very high 29th: 0.867 very high IHDI 14th	0.870 very high 46th: 0.819 very high IHDI 33rd	0.906 very high 35th: 0.817 very high IHDI 35th	0.880 very high 44th: 0.833 very high IHDI 28th

== See also ==
=== Other groups in Central Europe ===
- AHICE (Art Historian Information from Central Europe)
- Bucharest Nine
- Central European Defence Cooperation
- Central European Initiative
- Salzburg Forum
- Three Seas Initiative

=== Similar groups ===
- Association Trio
- Commonwealth of Independent States
- Craiova Group
- EU Med Group
- Lublin Triangle
- Nordic Defence Cooperation
- Nordic-Baltic Eight
- Weimar Triangle
- Weimar+
- Open Balkan

=== Other ===
- Central Europe
- Comecon
- Eastern Bloc
- International Visegrád Day
- Pact of Free Cities
- British–Polish–Ukrainian trilateral pact
- Soviet Union
- Warsaw Pact
- Intermarium (region)
