= CEDC =

CEDC may refer to:

- Central European Defence Cooperation
- Central European Development Corporation
- Central European Distribution Corporation, owner of Bols (brand)
- Clark Electric Distribution Corporation, see Electricity sector in the Philippines
- Community Enterprise Development Corporation, see Alaska Commercial Company
