= Central European Defence Cooperation =

Military collaboration among Central European states

- Logo

- Map of Europe indicating the member countries of the Central European Defence Cooperation
- Membership: Austria; Croatia; Czech Republic; Hungary; Slovakia; Slovenia

Leaders
  - Rotating Presidency: Slovenia (2026)
- Establishment: 2010

Area
  - Total: 381,676 km^{2} (147,366 sq mi) (62nd)

Population
  - Estimate: ▼40,609,125 (39th)
- GDP (PPP): estimate
  - Total: ▲$2.52 trillion (19th)
  - Per capita: ▲$62,007 (35th)
- GDP (nominal): estimate
  - Total: ▲$1.68 trillion (17th)
  - Per capita: ▲$41,381 (34th)
- HDI: 0.921 very high (16th)
- Website https://cedc.info/

The Central European Defence Cooperation (CEDC) is a military collaboration consisting of the Central European states of Austria, Croatia, the Czech Republic, Hungary, Slovakia and Slovenia. Poland has an observer status in this cooperative framework.

The joint objective is enhancing the defence co-operation, including the pooling and sharing of defence capabilities of the member countries and organizing common training and exercises. Since the European migrant crisis of 2015-2016 the cooperation has focused on handling mass migration too.

The CEDC was created in 2010. All members are also members of European Union and all except Austria are in NATO. The presidency rotates yearly. As of 2026, the presidency is held by Slovenia.

The CEDC geo-political borders are more or less the same borders of the former Habsburg monarchy, and its successors, the Austrian Empire and Austria-Hungary. Territory of participating states is 381,682 km^{2} while the territory of the Austrian Empire in 1804 was 698,700 km^{2}.

== History ==
Formation of the group started in late 2010, the first meeting of defence ministers took place in June 2012 in Frauenkirchen, Austria.

From March 31 to April 1, 2016, a conference of defense ministers from the CEDC member states as well as those from Poland, Serbia, North Macedonia and Montenegro took place in Vienna. The central theme was the European migrant crisis. Germany and Greece were also invited but did not participate. A joint initiative was taken to secure the external border, a continued closure of the Balkan route and the implementation of settlement measures of migrants who had arrived previously.

On 19 June 2017 the six countries pledged in Prague closer cooperation on tackling illegal migration including the use of armed forces. Among the group's goals is that all migrants who want to apply for asylum in any EU country must do so from outside the bloc. Countries are working on the joint action plan, which will distribute tasks between member's armies, police forces and other organisations when common response is needed.

In September 2017 the group organized a joint military exercise Cooperative Security 2017 (COOPSEC17) in Allentsteig, Austria focused on fortifying borders against mass migration.

== See also ==
- Visegrád Group
- EU Med Group
- Craiova Group
- Central European Initiative
- Open Balkan
- Nordic Defence Cooperation
- Three Seas Initiative
- Salzburg Forum
- Slavkov Declaration
- Common Security and Defence Policy
