= AHICE =

Supraregional art and heritage news service

The AHICE project (Art Historian Information from Central Europe) is a supraregional art and heritage news service, bringing together almost 170 partners from the Visegrád Group countries. Its aim is to facilitate access to information about events in the Czech Republic, Hungary, Poland and Slovakia. The ICC's institutional partners in the AHICE project are the Moravian Gallery (Czech Republic), the Department of Art History at Comenius University (Slovakia) and the National Office of Cultural Heritage (Hungary). The service is a project of the International Culture Centre in Kraków.
