= International Visegrád Day =

European day celebrating intergovernmental cooperation

- Visegrád Group
- Observed by: Poland; Czechia; Slovakia; Hungary
- Type: International
- Significance: Civil awareness day
- Date: 15 February
- Next time: 15 February 2027
- Frequency: Annual

International Visegrád Day commemorates the anniversary of the meeting of the presidents of Poland and Czechoslovakia and the prime minister of Hungary at Visegrád Castle on 15 February 1991. It is celebrated on 15 February every year. It was initiated by the International Visegrad Fund along with public service media from Visegrád Group countries (Telewizja Polska, Polskie Radio, Česká televize, Český rozhlas, Rozhlas a televízia Slovenska, Médiaszolgáltatás-támogató és Vagyonkezelő Alap) and established by memorandum of understanding between public service media form Visegrád Group countries on 18 June 2015.

The aim of establishing the day is to underline historical and social ties binding the people and institutions of Poland, Czechia, Slovakia, and Hungary, and to promote their cooperation. Public service media of Visegrád Group countries celebrate this day by broadcasting content that supports cooperation between the four states and underlines common issues and problems.

The first Visegrád Day was celebrated on 15 February 2016, on the 25th anniversary of the original meeting, in 1991.
