= Salzburg Forum =

- Membership: Austria; Bulgaria; Croatia; Czech Republic; Hungary; Poland; Romania; Slovakia; Slovenia
- Establishment: 2000
- Website www.salzburgforum.org

The Salzburg Forum (SF) is a Central European security partnership of Austria, Bulgaria, Croatia, the Czech Republic, Hungary, Poland, Romania, Slovakia and Slovenia. Member states cooperate in areas of police cooperation, illegal immigration, witness protection, fight against drugs, traffic safety and other areas of internal security. They also focus on positions coordination and advancing common interests in the European Union in the area of Home Affairs. At least two conferences of interior ministers per year are held. As a rule, three SF ministerial meetings are held per year. One meeting takes place in the country holding the presidency and one further meeting is usually held in summer in Austria. In addition, ministers regularly meet in the margins of EU Council meetings.

== Purpose ==
In a report on migration in the Czech Republic, the responsible Czech ministry published the following summary on SF.

“The Ministers of the Interior of the Czech Republic, Hungary, Poland, Austria, Slovakia, and Slovenia have cooperated within the Salzburg groups since the adoption of the Salzburg Declaration in 2001. Ministers of Bulgaria and Romania joined the group in 2005 as candidate countries of the European Union. This cooperation became a basis for close partnership of participating countries in activities relating to internal security and regional stability. The initial objective of the Salzburg Group was, through mutual cooperation and exchanges of experience, to facilitate the inclusion of candidate countries and new EU Member States into a single European area of freedom, security and justice, with priorities being police cooperation, border checks, illegal migration, and asylum. Activities of the Salzburg Group focus nowadays mainly on specific cooperation in the area of common regional issues in the context of membership of the Salzburg Group states in the European Union. The Salzburg Group is, according to the statement of the Commissioner for Justice and Home Affairs, Mr. Frattini, at the meeting of the Ministers of the Interior of the Salzburg Group states held in Gratz, Austria, in July 2005, an important forum for the exchange of opinions, ideas and experiences concerning the creation of the area of freedom, security and justice, i.e. tasks arising from the Hague Programme. A special emphasis is, in this context, placed on regional cooperation regarding asylum and migration, in particular on enhancing information exchanges and cooperation between public institutions concerned, the development of common strategies for combating illegal migration, trafficking in human beings and the exploitation of women and children, as well as on the harmonisation of relevant legal provisions of the European Union in relation to third countries. With regard to the domain of asylum, cooperation aims at harmonising standards for the admission of asylum seekers and procedural guarantees corresponding with the good practice of asylum proceedings in EU Member States. An Expert Working Group for information on countries of origin of asylum seekers operates within the Salzburg Group.”

== Structure ==
The Ministers of Interior of the member states (and their experts) meet several times per year. Since 1 July 2004 the SF has been organized as a semi-annual presidency, which rotates in alphabetical order according to the English name of the member states. Until 1 July 2004 all the SF meetings were organized solely by Austria.

== Reconstructed timeline ==
=== 17–19 July 2003, Fuschl (Salzburg) ===
At the fourth SF participants included not only the six members, but also Antonio Vitorino (EU Commissioner for JHA) and Giuseppe Pisanu (EU Council's President, Minister of Interior of Italy). This was the first time that the President of the European Council has participated in the SF meeting. The key points of the meeting were:

- The ministers agreed that the SF would support the neighbours of Austria to accept the Schengen-System, this way a double safe zone would unfold which provides Austria more security. Notwithstanding Austria was highly interested in gradually moving the Schengen border to the external border of the EU.
- Pisanu insisted on the main issues of the Italian presidency in the field of internal security: border control, migration, and asylum, war on terrorism and organised crime. Each country should decide on its own the number of immigrants to be received. Better cooperation is needed with the transit countries. In the border control "common units" should be established, first in the "smallest and weakest" countries so that the change for the Schengen-System would be easier for the countries of East Europe and the Mediterranean. He urged a strict visa policy and compulsory stamping for tourists with visa-waiver. The unfounded asylum applications should be firmly refused. Common investigation teams should be established in the fight against organized crime, where the national police chiefs might have a leading role in order to support the Europol's strategic direction. A network of contact officers should be set up.
- Vitorino urged the establishment of a European Border Police for extreme situations, but the integrity of the external border should be provided by the national border patrol.
- The ministers of interior signed a "Common Statement on the regional cooperation in the frame of the expanded European Union". The statement is on the Schengen cooperation at the borders and the establishment of a European external border management.
- Austria and Slovenia signed an agreement on cooperation and improving security in the two countries, which ought to contribute to the preparation of opening their borders even before Slovenia's EU accession.
- Austria demanded a common European border protection for which the first step would be the common standards of education, equipment, participation of national border officers and the improvement of the national border services. This work is based on an Italian study which proposes a network of decentralised competences. Austria would take part in the education of the border officers and provides the core material for their studies and the financial and personal background as well. A permanent coordination office could be built in Austria.
- Giuseppe Pisanu, Rado Bohinc (Slovenia) and Ernst Strasser (Austria) signed a protocol on police co-operation in supervising state borders and preventing illegal migration

=== Austrian Presidency, 1st half year, 2004 ===
==== 26 January 2004, Vienna ====
At a meeting between the American Attorney General John Ashcroft and the Austrian interior minister Ernst Strasser, the Austrian minister used the opportunity to point out insofar the European security is concerned Austria's place as a bridge between the western and eastern European countries and their task to connect these states, especially the SF countries to the USA. He also talked about the goals of SF, like a "European police force" (the so-called Euro cops), the implementation of the Solana Paper, the West Balkan Strategy, the training workshop for air marshals, and the fight against drug trade in the countries of Central Asia and the Caucasus, which are significant for transit to Austria. A future visit at SF meeting by a USA representative was also mentioned.

==== 15 April 2004, Vienna ====
Interior ministers of 11 current (6 of them that time still future) members of the European Union met for informal talks to discuss common security and immigration issues during which Austria submitted a six-point security plan. Austria Interior Ministry spokesman Rudolf Gollia said the talks would take place in Vienna between the five largest EU states—Britain, France, Germany, Italy and Spain—and the six-nation Salzburg Group, comprising the Czech Republic, Hungary, Poland, Slovakia, Slovenia and Austria itself. Austria's Interior Minister Ernst Strasser outlined six proposals to share information and coordinate measures taken to improve security in Europe, in the wake of the 11 March train bombings in Madrid in which killed 191 people. Strasser's six-point plan included access to a European finger-printing databank, exchanges of information about people seeking visas and about travellers, improved cooperation between Interpol and its European equivalent Europol, new biometric information in passports and standardised security at EU airports. After the Madrid attacks, Austria called for the establishment of a new intelligence service dubbed "a European CIA", but ran into opposition from France and Germany. The ministers also discussed the status of refugees which had just been harmonised by the EU despite criticism from aid and rights organisations.

=== Czech Presidency, 2004 2nd half year ===
==== 15–17 July 2004, Fuschl ====
- The Austrian Interior Minister insisted on that the future EU Border Agency should be in one of the SF member countries and the financial burden of the external border protection should be divided among all EU states. Mr. Strasser was skeptical about the plans of the Dutch presidency on common EU border police.
- From the SF Slovenia, Poland and Hungary were competing for the seat of the border agency, along with Estonia and Malta.
- The above-mentioned points were included in the twelve points proposal which was to be filed at the JHA Council on 19 July.
- The participants agreed on an anti-terror package which eminently based on the cooperation of the police authorities and the improvement of the data exchange. The plans include a study on the use of the EURODAC databank for purposes fighting criminality and terror.
- It was agreed experts from the newcomers should be involved in developing the second generation Schengen Information System (SIS II) so as to secure technical uniformity.
- Simplified border regimes should be introduced on other internal borders such as already exist between Slovenia, Austria and Hungary.
- Quick completion of Europol's information infrastructure and a two-phase evaluation of the Schengen system (dividing the evaluated regions into chapters which would be temporarily closed, according to the rule that nothing can be closed without having discussed everything) were the main issues at the meeting, according to the Polish Ministry of Interior.
- The Polish minister presented a feasibility study on the implementation of a system of improved exchange of data with Europol through a network of liaison officers. In his opinion, a more co-ordinated and active communication between liaison officers from the countries of the Salzburg Forum is possible. He was also in favour of a quick completion of electronic infrastructure of Europol - EIS system, which will ensure a safe and undelayed communication between liaison officers residing in the Hague and the national contact points delegating them. He suggested preparing and signing a joint declaration on creating a "Network of Co-operation between Liaison Officers of the Salzburg Group" and forming a working group whose task would be to draw up detailed guidelines regulating co-operation within the framework of this initiative.5
- The Hungarian party put forward a concept of removing the existing barriers which at present make it impossible to use the EURODAC system for police purposes. The concept envisages adding the records gathered in the national criminal dactyloscopic registers to the EURODAC database and providing Europol, Eurojust and national police authorities with access to the so enriched base. Fingerprints would be taken from persons arrested while illegally crossing the border or detained during an illegal stay. They would be compared not only with the fingerprints of persons seeking asylum, but also with other records of the enlarged EURODAC database.

==== 12 November 2004, Prague. ====
- Main issues: Opening of the EURODAC database for police purposes, cross-border exchange of police data, EU accession 2007, Schengen Accession in 2007.
- Austria signed a readmission agreement with the Czech Republic so that it would be easier to readmit the asylum-seekers who have already started an asylum procedure in the Czech Republic.
- Slovenia expected to enter the Schengen group by 2007.
- Newcomers should have access to the Schengen database even before they officially join the group. (Slovenia).
- Hungary suggested that EURODAC data should be used by other databases such as Europol, Eurojust, INTERPOL and the Schengen group.

=== Hungarian Presidency, 2005 1st half year ===
==== January, 2005 Warsaw ====
The ministers of foreign affairs of SF countries met for the fifth times in Warsaw to discuss the actual political matters in Ukraine, and the further relationship between the EU and Ukraine. The ministers also talked about the future EU relationship between the EU countries and the West-Balkan countries, the bases of the EU neighbour politics, the humanitarian aid, and the consular collaboration.

==== 21–22 April 2005, Budapest ====
During the first half of 2005 Hungary presided over the SF, that time consisted of the Ministers of the Interior of Austria, Czech Republic, Hungary, Poland, Slovakia, and Slovenia. The program of the 22 April 2005, meeting of the Forum included, inter alia, enlarging the 6 Forum to Romania and Bulgaria, cooperating to protect witnesses, sharing reliable information on the country of origin in asylum procedures, and preparing to implement the Schengen Convention standards, the Visa Information System, and biometrics. The Hungarian Minister of Interior has put forward the idea of connecting Eurodac (the EU database on asylum seekers and illegal aliens) to criminal records, an idea that was fully supported by the five other ministers and was proposed to the EU.

Under the Hungarian freedom of information legislation HCLU obtained a note from the Hungarian Minister of Interior issued by the Hungarian Deputy State Secretary of International Affairs of the Ministry of Interior, July 2005.

(unofficial translation)

Subject: summary on the Hungarian presidency of the Salzburg Forum

1. Completion of a list of experts, which aims to develop the coordination mechanism of the SF. The list includes the contacts of experts from SF countries who work either in Brussels or other capitols. This establishes the possibility for discussion by them on such specific matters as migration, visa policy and law enforcement.
2. With the expansion of the Salzburg Group, internal affairs ministers of Romania and Bulgaria have been invited to the Ministers Meeting in Graz on 28–29 July, which further helps the integration of these new members to the EU.
3. In relation to cooperation in criminal matters, examining possible regional cooperation trends and uniting the witness protection activity was launched on Hungarian initiation. SF member states accepted the plan and Austria has volunteered to carry it out. A joint document was expected to be issued in July by the justice and internal affairs departments.
4. Hungary's intention in planning to share the reliable and up-to-date country of origin information is to assist the SF in finding its own path down the clearly confined ways of the EU. Experience gained would not only benefit Hungary, but also other member states and bordering third states. SF member states have agreed to have a specific expert group work out all related details. Hungary has volunteered to carry out the project. (The UNHCR has shown an interest in taking part in the country of origin project and have offered their help.)
5. An agreement was reached in relation to cooperation on practices in traffic-safety and traffic-control. It was agreed that a traffic-enforcement network will be established for information-exchange, experience collection and expert-exchange. Basically, national police headquarters of the SF states will cooperate. The launch of the operation "Falcon" was decided by ministers at the Assembly of ministers in Budapest. With the joint cooperation of six countries' police, Operation Hawk took place 6–12 June 2005. Among the goals of the operation were to enforce drivers to obey the rule of the road, to filter out drivers under the influence of alcohol and search for missing persons and individuals for whom warrants of arrest have been issued. The operation was a success.
6. Review of the initiatives of 2004 – 2005
  1. In reply to the report submitted to the European Committee by the SF on the expansion of EURODAC functions/functioning, the European Committee stated that it intends to issue a publication on increased synergies between SIS II, VIS and EURODAC in 2006.
  2. On Czech initiative, the matter of criminal information exchange was brought up on 15–17 July 2004 in Salzburg. The goal was to upgrade results and to exchange data of national police databases. Member states supported the proposal of organizing regular conferences for experts on data protection. Primarily current legal matters could be discussed. The conferences have not taken place until this day.
  3. The establishment of a Communication Directors Network was a Hungarian initiative. Throughout the decision-making process of the Council of the European Union, difficult and sensitive matters of internal politics frequently emerge. In such cases, the launch of concurrent media campaigns based on common argument in the region's states could be very effective, as states of the SF often face the same problems. The first meeting took place in Budapest, on 22 April 2005.
7. In the interest of underlining an effective and joint stand, primary interest matters such as strengthening of inner security, fighting against illegal migration, stressing of return policy, fighting against corruption as well as refugee issues and migration management were discussed and debated and settled at the meetings of the Salzburg Forum.
8. During the preparation and organization of the Schengen evaluations, Poland-Slovakia, and Czech Republic-Slovenia-Hungary have to work closely together in groups assigned by the Schengen Workgroup. The collation on technical details have begun, the appointed coordinators contacted. The exchange of the national Schengen Action Plans among each other, through which SF member states joining the Schengen Agreement has secured the excellent possibility of familiarizing with other member state's current stand and the remaining law-making and institution development tasks.

=== Cooperation in the area of traffic control ===
The ministers of interior discussed how to make regional cooperation more efficient, topics included the highway patrol, highway security and the small border traffic, together with the expectations of the Schengen Agreement.

The cooperation in the area of traffic control began on 22 April 2005 with the meeting of the ministers of interior in Budapest. In advance at the meeting of experts at the Ministry of Interior an agreement had been concluded about the necessity of the cooperation which specified the fields of cooperation and given concrete suggestions of the minister's meeting.

From the Hungarian side, the following suggestions were introduced concerning the traffic control:

- unified approach at the performance of the traffic checks (by concentrating on the highest risk factors and using the same kind of sanctions)
- introducing the "objective responsibility" as regards infringements of traffic control
- initiative of the most advanced traffic control systems
- more efficient action against the foreign traffic violators (necessity of bilateral agreements, etc.)
- the further deepening of relations, professional exchange, and education of the best practical solutions through the exchange of policemen who speak foreign languages.

At the ministers of interior meeting in Budapest an agreement was concluded about the establishment of a "traffic control contact network" through the SF countries, which would help the daily share of information and the professional experiences, plus the experts exchange.

This would be the beginning of all the actions, which would help to reach further goals.

On Slovak initiative the ministers also agreed on common traffic controls. The first action called "Hawk" was made 6–11 June 2005 with great success. This was the first common traffic control action made by 6 EU countries. The second action was at the end of July 2005, which was organized by the Hungarian police.

After the success of these actions, if the ministers approve this suggestion the further traffic control actions would be organized, coordinated and evaluated by the Hungarian police department of traffic control according to the preliminary agreement of the international partners. Next to the common traffic controls personal discussions and professionals meetings are needed in every year or half year. (The above-mentioned suggestions were realized at the next meeting of ministers of interior in Graz at 28–29 July 2005. Hungary took on the execution of the future traffic control actions, and Poland, under its half year of presidency of the SF, would plan the meeting of experts.)

=== Polish Presidency, 2005 2nd half year ===
==== 28–29 July 2005, Graz ====
As the Polish Ministry of Interior and Administration reported

“Another meeting of the Salzburg Group took place in Graz (Austria) on 28 and 29

July 2005. The Ministry of the Interior and Administration of Poland was represented by the Undersecretary of State, Mr Paweł Dakowski. The Ministers of the Interior of Austria, Poland, Hungary, Slovakia, Slovenia, Czech Republic and Romania as well as the E.U Commissioner, Mr. Franco Frattini and the Director General of the International Organisation for Migration (IOM), Mr Brunson McKinley discussed issues connected with:

- the Action Plan, which is a result of the Hague Programme;
- combating terrorism, especially after the recent events in London;
- regional co-operation.

Romania became an official member of the Group.

Ministers adopted Declaration.

Minister Paweł Dakowski introduced main priorities of the Polish Presidency in the Salzburg Group. The priorities are:

- Schengen evaluation;
- Co-ordination of tasks connected with the area of witness protection;
- Well thought out approach to the future exchange of credible and updated information regarding the country of origin;

Co-ordination of efforts in the area of road traffic patrol and safety on roads.“

==== 19 October 2005, Warsaw ====
Another consultation was on 19 October 2005 in Warsaw, where the Romanian and Bulgarian representatives of traffic police were present too. The reason of this consultation was the development of the regional road regulation coordination, the determination of the main risks in traffic security, and the development of the common traffic campaigns. The Hungarian side proposed four common actions executions for the year of 2006 in Warsaw (April - drugs and alcohol check, May - safety belt check, September - traffic control of trucks, October - speeding control).

==== November 2005, Warsaw ====
The Czech Ministry of Interior reported that

“An Expert Working Group for information on countries of origin of asylum seekers

operates within the Salzburg Group. Its first meeting was held in November 2005 in Warsaw. This meeting identified common priorities of participating states with regard to the countries of origin of asylum seekers arriving in the states of the Salzburg Forum. The participants discussed also issues of closer regional cooperation in collecting information on the countries of origin in relation to the objectives setting in this respect by the Hague Programme.”

=== Slovak Presidency, 2006 1st half year ===
==== 22–23 May 2006, Bratislava ====
At the meeting of the ministers of interior of the SF countries the question of the European cooperation in protection of witnesses was not solved, although the EU countries decided long ago to make it possible for the protected witnesses and their families to start a new life in another country. The solution failed because of the problem of the biometric parts of the documents like finger prints and pictures. The ministers also discussed the financing of the Eastern EU borders, and the new European traffic control actions.

=== Slovenian Presidency, 2006 2nd half year ===
==== 27–28 July 2006, Göttweig ====
The SF meeting in Göttweig was the first time when at a meeting of the group Croatia took part as an observer. The eubusiness.com reported

“Interior Ministers from eight Central European countries demanded on Friday that new EU members be quickly allowed into the Schengen border-free zone. The ministers of the "Salzburg Group" countries (plus Croatia), demanded that the sophisticated computer system SIS II, intended to ensure the safety of the borderfree zone, be rapidly implemented after long delays. This system should be "completed in a timely fashion... in order to lift internal border controls as soon as possible," they said in a declaration, citing their own efforts to improve border controls in accordance with Schengen. European Union Justice Commissioner Franco Frattini had said the EU's newest members would join the Schengen unified visa system in March 2008 at the earliest, instead of autumn 2007,

because of technical problems.

Countries within the Schengen zone eliminated their internal borders in 1995 but reinforced controls on their external borders with the Strasbourg-based Schengen Information System (SIS).

SIS relies on the authorities (police, courts and customs offices) of the 15 Schengen states but does not have the capacity to absorb the 10 members who joined the EU in 2004, as well as Switzerland which joined Schengen last year, according to Brussels, making the second-generation SIS necessary.

The Salzburg Group countries, which want to act as a counterbalance to the large EU members on issues of justice and the police, also agreed to reinforce DNA data exchanges to fight crime, Austrian Interior Ministry spokeswoman Iris Mueller-Guttenbrunn said.”

==== 25 October 2006, Brdo ====
The Slovenian Ministry of the Interior summarized that

“Representatives of the Ministries of the Interior of Austria, Czech Republic, Hungary, Poland, Slovakia, Bulgaria, Romania and Slovenia met today at Brdo near Kranj within the framework of the Salzburg Forum. On behalf of Slovenia, which on 1 July 2006 took over the presidency of the Forum, Minister Mate had invited the ministers to hold a discussion on the future strategy and manner of operation of the Forum as well as on the programme and priorities of Slovenia’s EU presidency. Additionally, ministers reviewed the activities of the existing working groups and discussed the final confirmation of leadership of individual working groups assumed by the member countries.

At the press conference, the Minister of the Interior of the Republic of Austria Liese Prokop and the Minister of the Interior of the Republic of Slovenia Dragutin Mate summed up that the Salzburg Forum nowadays represents a respectable group of countries endeavouring to promote common interests within the EU, assisting each other and cooperating in various fields. During today’s meeting, they discussed the need to cooperate with other countries in the repression of organised crime, terrorism and illegal migration.

The Portugal’s proposal of setting up the system »SISone4all« or »SIS I+«, which represents an alternative solution for the new EU Member States in joining the Schengen Area, featured high on the agenda. As Minister Mate said, Slovenia’s access to the Schengen database depends on the opinion of the EU Justice and Home Affairs Council, which will decide on eventual implementation of the system SIS I+ at its meeting this December. »The 25 EU Member States must receive complete assurance that the system will provide the highest security standards, that it will be tested and technically adequate« replied Minister Liese Prokop when asked when we can expect entry into the Schengen area without internal borders.”

“Before the informal meeting of the JHA Council, in Tampere (Finland) Slovenia, in its capacity as the presiding country of the Salzburg Forum, organised a meeting of Salzburg Forum Member States which was mostly aimed at exchanging views on the new schedule of implementing SIS II. Slovenian Minister of the Interior Dragutin Mate reiterated the concerns and dissatisfaction expressed at the meeting between the current presidency and future presiding states of the Council of the European Union over the current situation and appealed to Salzburg Forum states to seek alternative solutions that would enable

access to Schengen databases irrespective of future development of SIS II.

The Czech Republic agreed with the suggested approach in principle whereas the rest of the SF Member States supported further development of SIS II and appealed to the Commission to provide more transparency, mostly by submitting regular reports on the current state of affairs in SIS II development to the Council of Ministers.

In the context of the debates on delayed SIS II implementation and, subsequently, abolition of internal borders, the Slovenian Minister of the Interior Dragutin Mate drew attention to a great financial burden that will be shouldered on, mostly, new Member States.

Ministers of the Salzburg Forum wrote a letter to Vice-President Frattini and the Finnish chairperson. The letter called upon the current EU presidency and the Commission to come up with solutions to help overcome financial implications of the delay until entering the Schengen area by either considering the 2007-2013 financial instruments or establishing a special financial instrument for that purpose.”

==== 4 October 2006 ====
The development of the Schengen Information System, the visa policy, the function of the European Union Fundamental Rights Agency, the criminal protection of the intellectual property were among the discussed topics of the meeting. The member states paid greater attention to the review of the Hague Programme.

=== Austrian Presidency, 2007 1st half year ===
==== 12–13 July 2007, Innsbruck ====
This meeting dealt with the enlargement of the Schengen area, and the European Football Championship, which will be organized by Austria this time.

The Hungarian minister introduced the actions, which have been taken to achieve full membership in the Schengen area: the technical developments, the training of the personal staff, the police's integration, and believed that the Hungarian accession will not increase the illegal immigration and organized crime in Austria.

He also indicated that the Hungarian police is ready to monitor the Hungarian fans, who will travel to the Championship, to keep up the public order. Moreover, he mentioned all the measures to be demanded on the Hungarian side, when Austria will set back the frontier control during the Championship. They also discussed the SF's future foreign strategy, the future of the European internal/interior politics from 2010, the possibility of making a European Information Net. A Common Declaration was signed by the participants including all these matters (http://www.bmi.gv.at/bmireader/documents/430.pdf).

In the second semester of 2007

“Bulgaria took up the Presidency of the Salzburg Forum, which unites the

countries from Central Europe. This country will work for the further confirmation of the Forum as a regional mechanism for exchange of information and coordinating positions in the sphere of internal affairs within the EU; as well as for encouraging common interests, the Ministry of Home Affairs announced. Bulgaria’s presidency of the Forum would focus on the development of the “external dimension” of the Salzburg Forum and the enhancement of cooperation with the countries of the Western Balkans.

The first one of the basic political goals of the Bulgarian Presidency of the Salzburg Forum is the enhancement of exchange among member-countries in the sphere of internal affairs, said at a news conference Bulgarian Interior Minister Rumen Petkov. The Salzburg Forum was created by the countries of Central and East Europe for the building of common positions and policies in the sphere of justice and internal order. During its presidency Bulgaria will work for the deepening of police cooperation through the creation of operative relations, a system for information exchange in real time and the working out of a common

database.“

=== Austrian Presidency, 2007 2nd half year ===
==== 20–21 September 2007, Pleven ====
This meeting established the Group of Friends of Salzburg Forum from the Western Balkans. The function of this group was to promote dialogue and cooperation between the Salzburg Forum countries and third countries.

"The cooperation between the Salzburg Forum and its Friends is based on a balanced

and flexible approach, aiming to ensure maximum coordination and coherence in their joint activities, thus avoiding unduly duplication and overlap of efforts and resources. The common goal of the Salzburg Forum countries and their Friends from Western Balkans is to enhance the level of security of their citizens and to contribute to the further stabilisation of the region. The additional strengthening of mutual trust is one of the most important prerequisites for an active and successful partnership. The Salzburg Forum countries will actively support their Friends from the Western Balkans on their way to European integration. They will also encourage and assist them in the adoption and effective implementation of European standards practices in the field of justice and home affairs, and more specifically towards achieving the European security standards regarding fight against terrorism, organised crime, corruption, and illegal migration, building upon the results achieved so far."

Other topics discussed by the Forum at Pleven meeting were the security of EU external borders, EU Migration Policy, and enhancing FRONTEX capacity.

=== Czech Presidency, 2008 ===
==== 15–16 May 2008, Prague ====
The Prague meeting of the SF was headed by principal quaestor Vasile-Gabriel Nita, Secretary of State, Head of the Schengen Department of the MIAR.

In considering the external dimension of the Salzburg Forum, one of the key points addressed during this meeting was the decision to support Romania and Bulgaria in their efforts to join the Schengen territory. There were also approached questions regarding a possible European agreement in the area of Immigration and Asylum.

The prevention of road traffic accidents was also discussed. The future of the Schengen system was also addressed. At the conclusion of the meeting, the presiding country of the Salzburg Forum, the Czech Republic, presented the priorities of its EU Council Presidency, while the ministers also discussed the conclusions and recommendations of the working parties operating within the Salzburg Forum. The meeting concluded with a discussion on the development and implementation of the second-generation Schengen information system (SIS II) and on the potential for further enlargement of the Schengen area.

== The future ==
Apparently the SF continues its work at least until the Schengen Agreement implementation by Romania and Bulgaria. Although originally Austria has forged the coalition to speed up the abolishment of the borders with its neighbours within the Schengen framework, now the SF rises above the original plan both geographically and in scope of its activities.

According to the Austrian Federal Minister of Interior the members of the SF are powerful together (now that the coalition comprises eight EU states), but he has not substantiated his statement and it is unlikely that he will succeed in that in the near future.

== Calendar ==
Date	Location	Presidency
16–17 August 2000 (informal meeting)	Salzburg (A)	
26–28 July 2001 (informal meeting with Antonio Vitorino)		
25–27 July 2002 (informal meeting)	Salzburg (A)	
17–19 July 2003	Fuschl (Salzburg) (A)	
15 April 2004 15–17 July 2004; 12 November 2004	Vienna (A) Fuschl (A); Prague (CZ)	1st half year – 2nd half year (CZ)
25 January 2005	Warsaw (Pl)	1st half year (H)
22 April 2005 (experts’ consultation 24 March 2005; preparation for Graz 30 June – 1 July 2005)	Budapest (H) Vienna (A)	
28–29 July 2005	Graz (A)	2nd half year (Pl)
19 October 2005	Warsaw (Pl)	
November 2005	Warsaw (Pl)	
22–23 May 2006	Bratislava (SK)	1st half year (SK)
27–28 July 2006	Göttweig (A)	2nd half year (Sl)
25 October 2006	Brdo (Sl)	
4 October 2006		
12–13 July 2007	Innsbruck (A)	1st half year (A)
20–21 September 2007	Pleven (B)	2nd half of 2007 (BU)
15–16 May 2008	Prague (CZ)	

Forthcoming presidencies of the Salzburg Forum:

Czech Republic: 1st half of 2008
Hungary: 2nd half of 2008
Poland: 1st half of 2009
Romania: 2nd half of 2009
Slovakia: 1st half of 2010
Slovenia: 2nd half of 2010
Austria: 1st half of 2011

== Sources ==
Introduction

https://web.archive.org/web/20110607120800/http://www.mvcr.cz/dokument/2006/migrace05en.pdf

2003 Fuschl

http://www.bmi.gv.at/oeffentlSicherheit/2003/09_10/artikel_5.asp https://web.archive.org/web/20070429080845/http://slonews.sta.si/index.php?id=1134&s=48

2004 January Vienna

http://www.bmi.gv.at/oeffentlSicherheit/2004/03_04/artikel_14.asp

2004 April Vienna

http://www.borrull.org/e/noticia.php?id=31280&id2=2210

2004 Fuschl

http://www.vienna.at/engine.aspx?page=vienna-article-detail-print-page/cn/commonnews-20040717-042300_000030 http://www.mswia.gov.pl/wai/en/1/92 http://www.gzs.si/eng/news/sbw/past.asp?idi=340 http://www.mswia.gov.pl/portal/en/1/103

2004 Prag

http://www.ots.at/presseaussendung.php?schluessel=OTS_20041111_OTS0254&ch=politik https://web.archive.org/web/20080120073248/http://www.ukom.gov.si/eng/slovenia/publications/slovenia-news/1426/1433/

2005 Budapest

https://web.archive.org/web/20070315163636/http://www.privacyinternational.org/survey/phr2005/PHR2005greece-latvia.pdf http://balesetmegelozes_hu.web.maxer.hu/cms/index.php?option=com_content&task=view&id=47&Itemid=20

2005 Graz

https://web.archive.org/web/20110518233815/http://www.mswia.gov.pl/wai.php?serwis=en&dzial=1&id=145&sw=1 http://www.bmi.gv.at/oeffentlSicherheit/2005/09_10/FORUMSALZBURG.pdf

2005 Warsaw

https://web.archive.org/web/20110607120800/http://www.mvcr.cz/dokument/2006/migrace05en.pdf

2006 Heligendamm

http://arquivo.pt/wayback/20090715045142/http%3A//www.openeurope.org.uk/media%2Dcentre/article.aspx?newsid%3D1470

2006 Bratislava

https://web.archive.org/web/20110721105056/http://www.echotv.hu/index.php?akt_menu=73&page=448&catid=6

2006 Göttweig

http://www.eubusiness.com/Living_in_EU/060728170206.43ormt5j http://www.ots.at/presseaussendung.php?schluessel=OTS_20060721_OTS0094

2006 Brdo

https://web.archive.org/web/20070430090309/http://www.mnz.gov.si/en/splosno/vstopna_stran/current_events_news/more1/ https://web.archive.org/web/20070430090331/http://www.mnz.gov.si/en/splosno/vstopna_stran/current_events_news/jha/

2007 Innsbruck

http://www.inforadio.hu/hir/kulfold/hir http://ots.mti.hu/news.asp?view=2&newsid=45276 http://www.bnr.bg/RadioBulgaria/Emission_English/News/0507B16.htm

2007 Pleven

http://www.mswia.gov.pl/wai/en/1/381/Ministerial_Meeting_of_the_Salzburg_Forum.html http://press.mvr.bg/en/News/news080125_03.htm

2008 Prague

https://web.archive.org/web/20080526033043/http://www.mai.gov.ro/engleza/index10.htm#schengen https://web.archive.org/web/20110719072228/http://www.mnz.gov.si/en/splosno/cns/news/article/2049/5974/?cHash=fe69591cb9 http://tokyo.mae.ro/index.php?lang=en&id=31&s=67758

2012 Mátraháza
10–12 October

== See also ==
- Central European Defence Cooperation
- Visegrád Group
- Three Seas Initiative
- G6 (Group of Six)
- Area of freedom, security and justice
