= Three Seas Initiative =

International political forum of Middle-European states

- Logo

- Membership: Participants: Austria; Bulgaria; Croatia; Czech Republic; Estonia; Greece; Hungary; Latvia; Lithuania; Poland; Romania; Slovakia; Slovenia; Partner-participants: Albania; Moldova; Montenegro; Ukraine; Strategic partners: European Commission; Germany; Japan; Spain; Turkey; United States

Leaders
  - Chairman: Andrej Plenković, Prime Minister of Croatia
- Establishment: 2015

Area
  - Total: 1,218,975 km^{2} (470,649 sq mi)

Population
  - Estimate: ▼110,150,445
  - Density: 90/km^{2} (233.1/sq mi)
- GDP (nominal): 2022 estimate
  - Total: ▲€2.295 trillion
  - Per capita: ▲€20,838

The Three Seas Initiative (3SI or TSI), known also as the Baltic, Adriatic, Black Sea (BABS) Initiative or simply as the Three Seas (Polish: Trójmorze, Croatian: Inicijativa triju mora) is a forum of 13 states in the European Union, and four non-EU partner-participants, roughly connecting the Baltic, Adriatic, and Black Seas in Central and Eastern Europe. The Initiative aims to create a regional dialogue on questions affecting the member states.

In 2016, representatives of the original 12 member states (Austria, Bulgaria, Croatia, Czech Republic, Estonia, Hungary, Latvia, Lithuania, Poland, Romania, Slovakia, and Slovenia) met for their first summit in Dubrovnik, Croatia. At the seventh summit in 2022, Ukraine received the status of a partner-participant. At the 2023 summit, Greece became a member, and Moldova a partner-participant. At the 2025 summit, Albania and Montenegro became partner-participants.

== Statistics ==
The twelve Three Seas countries cover 29 percent of the European Union's territory (1,210,000 km^{2} or 470,000 sq mi), are home to 25 percent of the European Union's inhabitants (110 million), and produce €2.3 trillion or one seventh of the EU's GDP (nominal).

== History ==
The Three Seas Initiative, which was influenced by the Polish interwar Intermarium concept, was launched in 2015 by Polish President Andrzej Duda and Croatian President Kolinda Grabar-Kitarović.

=== First summit, Dubrovnik, 2016 ===
The Initiative's first summit, held in Dubrovnik, Croatia, on 25–26 August 2016, ended with a declaration of economic cooperation in energy and in transport and communications infrastructures. Polish President Andrzej Duda called the initiative "a new concept to promote Europe's unity and cohesion... an idea of cooperation among 12 countries located between the Adriatic, Baltic and Black Seas, the three seas of Central Europe."

Guests included Chinese Ministerial Assistant for Foreign Affairs Liu Haixing, who spoke about Three Seas Initiative's interconnectedness with China's Belt and Road Initiative, and former US National Security Advisor General James L. Jones, who stressed the Three Seas Initiative's role in European development and security.

=== Second summit, Warsaw, 2017 ===
The Initiative's second summit was held 6–7 July 2017 in Warsaw, Poland. Guest attendees included US President Donald Trump. The participating countries unanimously agreed to set up a Three Seas Business Forum.

=== Third summit, Bucharest, 2018 ===
The Initiative's third summit took place 17–18 September 2018 in Bucharest, Romania. Participants approved interconnection projects in three key areas: transport, energy, and digital. Guest attendees included President of the European Commission Jean-Claude Juncker, German Foreign Minister Heiko Maas, and US Secretary of Energy Rick Perry. The first edition of the Business Forum was organised. A 3SI Network of Chambers of Commerce was created, and a letter of intent was signed concerning establishment of a Three Seas Investment Fund.

=== 11th summit, Dubrovnik, 2026 ===
Around 1,600 representatives of total 724 companies from 45 countries registered for participation. At the pre-summit event, organized in cooperation with the Atlantic Council and the PPD gas company, US secretary of energy Chris Wright called for the construction of the infrastructure necessary for the expansion of the natural gas market, highlighting the example of the LNG terminal on Krk, built through a US-Croatian partnership. US Ambassador to Croatia Nicole McGraw emphasized in an interview with Hina the week before the summit that business agreements between the US and Croatia related to data centers and artificial intelligence would be signed at the summit. Croatian prime minister Andrej Plenković, Polish president Karol Nawrocki and Slovak president Peter Pellegrini stressed at a press conference at the end of the first day of the summit that "the United States remains Europe's most important strategic partner"; Nawrocki announced Poland, invited to the G20 summit in Miami, as "the spokesperson for the Three Seas at the Summit."

=== List of summits ===
	Date	Location	Hosting leader	Notes
1	2016; 25–26 August	Dubrovnik, Croatia	Kolinda Grabar-Kitarović	Format established.
2	2017; 6–7 July	Warsaw, Poland	Andrzej Duda	U.S. President Donald Trump attended.
3	2018; 17–18 September	Bucharest, Romania	Klaus Iohannis	E.U. Commission President Jean-Claude Juncker, German Foreign Minister Heiko Maas, and U.S. Secretary of Energy Rick Perry attended.
4	2019; 5–6 June	Ljubljana, Slovenia	Borut Pahor	E.U. Commission President Jean-Claude Juncker, German president Frank-Walter Steinmeier, and U.S. Secretary of Energy Rick Perry attended.
5	2020; 19 October	Tallinn, Estonia	Kersti Kaljulaid	Virtual summit
6	2021; 8–9 July	Sofia, Bulgaria	Rumen Radev	Greek president Katerina Sakellaropoulou attended.
7	2022; 20–21 June	Riga, Latvia	Egils Levits	
8	2023 6-7 September	Bucharest, Romania	Klaus Iohannis	IMF Managing Director Kristalina Georgieva attended. Greece became the 13th member of the initiative and Moldova a partner-participant.
9	2024 11 April	Vilnius, Lithuania	Gitanas Nausėda	Japan became 4th Strategic Partner of the Initiative
10	2025 28-29 April	Warsaw, Poland	Andrzej Duda	Albania and Montenegro became partner-participants.
11	2026 28-29 April	Dubrovnik, Croatia	Andrej Plenković	About 1,600 representatives of 724 companies and financial institutions (Blackstone, Canadian pension funds, various US fonds and investment banks, among others) from 45 countries registered. The American delegation is led by Energy Secretary Chris Wright. Polish president Karol Nawrocki, as well as government officials of Austria, Moldova, Czechia, Montenegro, Slovakia, Ukraine, Greece, Latvia, Lithuania, Romania, as well as Speaker of the Estonian Parliament and Slovenian Deputy Prime Minister are expected to participate.

== Projects ==
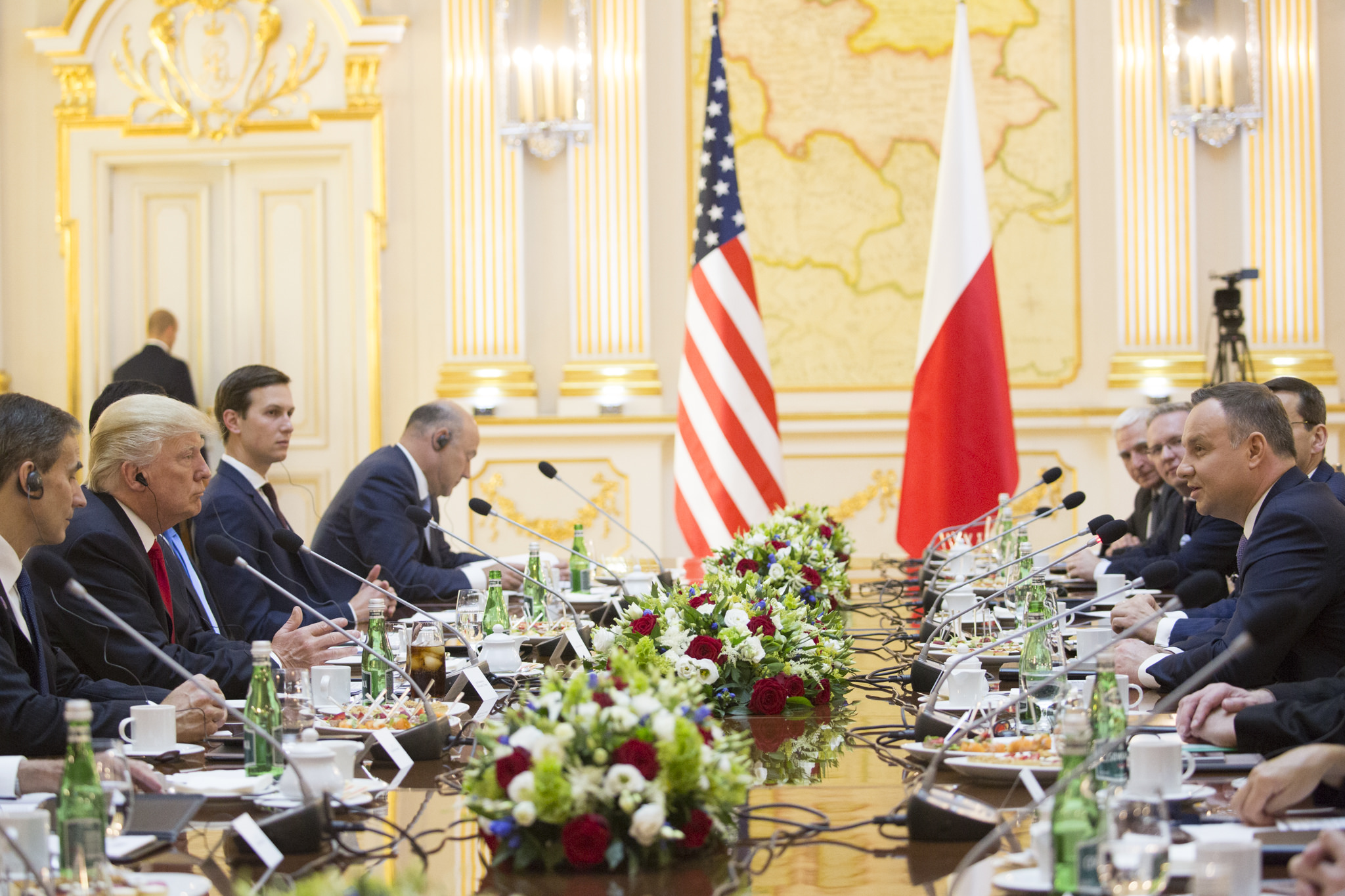
Donald Trump's visit to Poland, July 2017

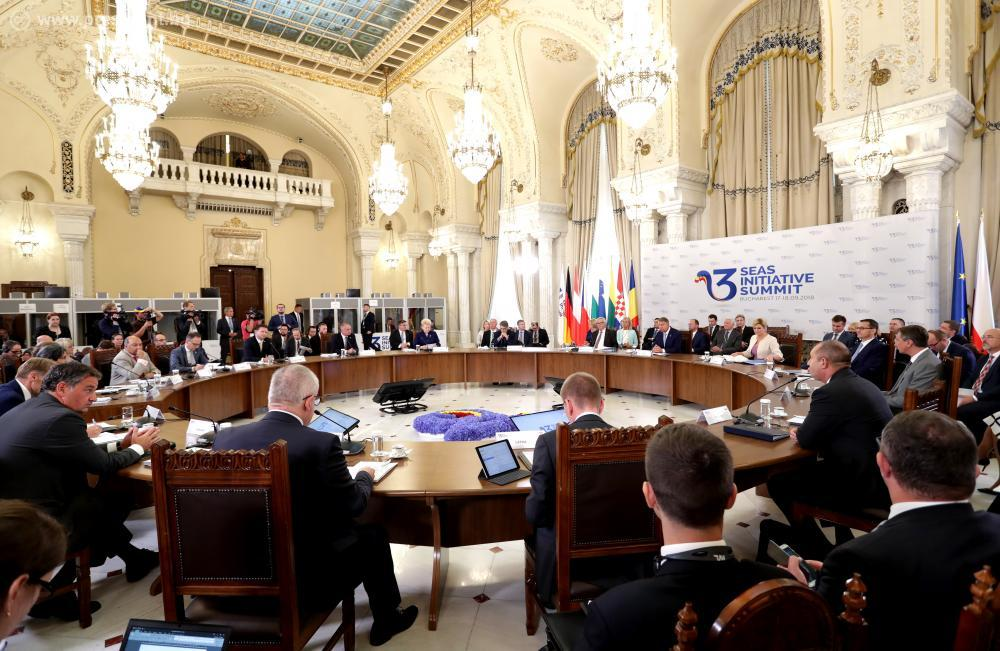
2018 Three Seas summit in Bucharest

The initiative is closely related to two major infrastructure projects in the region:

- A north–south highway "Via Carpathia", connecting Klaipėda in Lithuania with Thessaloniki in Greece
- Liquefied natural gas infrastructure, with sea terminals in Poland and Croatia and a connecting pipeline

Other projects are the Baltic-Adriatic Corridor, Via Baltica road, Rail Baltica and Amber Rail Freight Corridor rail connections. Another project is Rail-2-Sea, which aims to connect the Baltic Sea port of Gdańsk (Poland) with the Black Sea port of Constanța (Romania) through a 3,663 kilometres (2,276 miles) long railway line.

=== Three Seas Initiative Investment Fund (3SIIF) ===
The initial two founding institutions from Poland and Romania have committed themselves to make payments totaling more than 500 million euros. The Fund is open to other Three Seas countries, which may join it after obtaining appropriate permits. The supervisory board of the Fund consists of representatives of development banks from Poland, Romania, Latvia, and the Czech Republic.

In 2019, Bank Gospodarstwa Krajowego and Export–Import Bank of Romania signed the founding act of the Three Seas Initiative Investment Fund. The fund is to focus on projects creating transport, energy and digital infrastructure in the Three Seas region. Private investors from pension funds, private investment funds, and other entities will also be invited to the fund. The aim is to raise up to €3–5 billion.

The fund will engage, on a commercial basis, in infrastructure projects with a total value of up to €100 billion, while the needs of the Three Seas region have been estimated at over €570 billion.

Prior to the 2020 Tallinn Summit, United States Secretary of State Mike Pompeo pledged up to a billion dollars in financing for the Investment Fund. The investment was not made.

The fund's assets were estimated at €900 mil. in 2023. The fund is collaborating with the Amber Infrastructure Group in raising capital and managing investments.

== Perception ==
=== Croatia ===
Croatia spearheaded the initiative together with Poland in 2015. In 2020, the social-democratic president Zoran Milanović opposed the initiative, claiming it "unnecessary and potentially harmful due to possible resentment towards Berlin and Moscow." However, initiative is strongly supported by prime minister Andrej Plenković and minister of foreign affairs Gordan Grlić Radman, with Croatian government having its own national coordinator for the Initiative. Some of Croatian goals in the Initiative are connecting Rijeka and Zagreb by rail and Via Adriatic, improvement of the Adriatic-Ionian corridor into the European TEN-T corridor, liquefied natural gas terminal in the Adriatic, gas connection between Croatia and Bosnia and Herzegovina, among others. At the 2026 Summit in Dubrovnik, Croatia and US signed document on the intention of cooperation in the use of nuclear energy for civilian purposes and the 'southern gas interconnection' (južna plinska interkonekcija), i.e. the connection of the gas pipeline between Croatia and Bosnia and Herzegovina, which would reduce dependence on Russian gas and switch to gas supply from the LNG terminal on the island of Krk in northern Adriatic. At the same Summit, Plenković confirmed Croatian interest in partenrship for the Krško 2 nuclear plant in Slovenia, as well as for development of nuclear energy for civilian purposes.

=== Czech Republic ===
The Three Seas Initiative was perceived rather negatively by Czech experts and diplomats during its launch. It was seen as a Polish attempt to create its sphere of influence (similar to the historical perception of Intermarium). Further fears were related to a possibility of deepening the east–west division in the EU and exclusion of Germany. A long term Czech objection was that there should be no competing geopolitical project in the region that would weaken the EU. Some of those objections have been partially addressed lately also due to a good experience with cooperation on infrastructure projects in the Visegrád Group. Further improvement of Czech position toward the Initiative happened after the term of the president Miloš Zeman ended and the government could remove from the Czech priority list the controversial project of Danube-Oder-Elbe channel in 2023. The Ministry of Foreign Affairs suggested the new priority projects should be the gas connection STORK II and high-speed rail connection to Poland. On the other hand, the Czech Republic still does not seem interested in joining the Investment fund or hosting a summit.

=== Finland ===
The populist Finns Party has advocated for Finland to join the initiative.

=== Ukraine ===
In 2016, Ukraine was sent an invitation to the Three Seas Summit in Dubrovnik. However, no state representative was sent to the meeting. In August 2019, during the visit of Ukrainian President Volodymyr Zelenskyy to Poland, he stated that Ukraine is interested in becoming an active participant in regional projects and initiatives in Poland, such as the Three Seas, which covers the Baltic, Adriatic and Black Seas. It was also noted that Ukraine is already cooperating in the construction of the trans-European Via Carpatia highway, and is discussing an ambitious E-40 waterway project for Ukraine."

In October 2019, Polish Foreign Minister Jacek Czaputowicz said that Ukraine could not now join the Three Seas Initiative, as it includes the countries of Central and Southern Europe, which are members of the European Union. The head of Polish diplomacy explained that the Three Seas Initiative should not be associated with geopolitics, as it is only an infrastructure project.

In November 2019, during the visit of the President of Ukraine Volodymyr Zelenskyy to Estonia, he stated that Ukraine is interested in joining the TSI and intends to discuss this issue with Estonian partners.

After the start of the 2022 Russian invasion during the Russian-Ukrainian War, President of Poland Andrzej Duda in his address to the Verkhovna Rada of Ukraine on 22 May 2022, stated that Ukraine should join the Three Seas Initiative. Later, on 7 June 2022, the Prime Minister of Poland, Mateusz Morawiecki, at the opening of a two-day congress of local self-government in the Three Seas in Lublin, stated that the Three Seas Initiative is impossible without involving a free and sovereign Ukraine.

At the seventh summit in Riga on 20 June 2022, speaking on video, the President of Ukraine Volodymyr Zelenskyy stated that Ukraine should become a member of the Three Seas Initiative. Zelenskyy suggested strengthening the interpretation of cooperation within the Three Seas, emphasizing the importance of logistics. Speaking about cooperation in the energy sector, Zelenskyy reminded that Ukraine has one of the largest gas storage facilities in the region. At this summit Ukraine received the status of a partner-participant of the TSI, de facto becoming a participant in this initiative.

== See also ==
- Amber Road
- Association Trio
- Bucharest Nine
- Central European Defence Cooperation
- Central European Initiative
- Cooperation between China and Central and Eastern European Countries
- Craiova Group
- Historic recurrence
- Intermarium
- Intermarium (region)
- Open Balkan
- Lithuanian–Polish–Ukrainian Brigade
- Lublin Triangle
- Northern Future Forum
- Odesa Triangle
- Visegrád Group
