= Pact of Free Cities =

Cooperation agreement between European cities

The Pact of Free Cities originated as a cooperation agreement between the mayors of Bratislava, Budapest, Prague, and Warsaw—Matúš Vallo, Gergely Karácsony, Zdeněk Hřib, and Rafał Trzaskowski respectively—signed on 16 December 2019 at Central European University in Budapest. The goals of the signatories include sharing information about best practices in urban development, mitigating the housing crisis, and global warming. Since 2019, the pact has grown to include dozens of cities, mostly in Europe but also including Los Angeles in the United States.

== Background ==
According to Hřib, the initiative was first thought up by Karácsony, who, after winning an election against Fidesz' preferred candidate in October 2019, is facing reduction in local government autonomy. The first call to plan the pact was in November 2019. The mayors all control a significant part of their countries' economies: 25, 26, 17, and 27 percent of GDP respectively for Prague, Bratislava, Warsaw, and Budapest. The mayors all come from the same generation; the oldest is Trzaskowski (47) and the youngest Hřib (38). All are from pro-European parties that are in the opposition at the national level. According to Euractiv, the pact is ideologically inspired by the 2013 book If Mayors Ruled the World: Dysfunctional Nations, Rising Cities by American sociologist Benjamin Barber.

They published an article on the website of European Council on Foreign Relations to explain their decision, stating that they believe in "an open society based on our cherished common values of freedom, human dignity, democracy, sustainability, equality, the rule of law, social justice, tolerance, and cultural diversity". The pact has also been described as "anti-populist"; at the signing ceremony, Hřib said that populism provides "a simple and wrong answer to the problems" facing their cities and countries. Karácsony contrasted what he called the grassroots democracy practiced by cities with the populist approach: "The national populists advocate centralisation, and treat voters as ‘subjects’." Although the cities are the capitals of the four Visegrád Group countries, the initiative does not mention the Visegrád Group. Hřib stated that the alliance is a "pro-European, positive alliance, which is also open to other cities".

The venue, Central European University, was described as symbolic, given the Viktor Orbán government's attacks on the university which forced it to move most of its educational programs to Vienna.

== Aims ==
The goals of the signatories include sharing information about best practices in urban development, housing crisis, and global warming. They also are lobbying for European Union policies that are tailored for cities and for the ability to access European funding directly, rather than through national governments which have been accused of politicizing the disbursal of funds. Karácsony sees such direct access as a good alternative to blanket defunding of EU countries under rule of law conditionality.

In 2020, the mayors criticized the Polish government for its stance on climate change (it was the only EU country not to agree to become carbon-neutral by 2050). Trzaskowski wanted to be able to access European Green Deal funds in order to implement environmentally friendly policies in Warsaw. In August 2020, the mayors declared support for the 2020 Belarusian protests, stating "The future of Belarus should be in the hands of Belarusians, and not of Europe's last dictator, Alexander Lukashenko and his aides". In 2021, Hřib stated that the pact sent "a clear message that there are strong actors in Visegrad who are committed to liberal and progressive values of the EU".

== Reception ==
The pact is opposed by Visegrád national governments. However, transparency advocates, mayor of Berlin Michael Müller, and the European Green Party declared their support.

== Members ==
As of May 2026, the alliance has 49 member cities.

=== Founding cities ===
- Bratislava, Slovakia
- Budapest, Hungary
- (Czech Republic) Prague, Czechia
- Warsaw, Poland

=== Joined in 2021 ===
- Amsterdam, Netherlands
- Athens, Greece
- Barcelona, Spain
- Florence, Italy
- Frankfurt, Germany
- Gdańsk, Poland
- Ljubljana, Slovenia
- London, United Kingdom
- (United States) Los Angeles, California
- Mannheim, Germany
- Neu-Ulm, Germany
- Paris, France
- Podgorica, Montenegro
- Rijeka, Croatia
- Stuttgart, Germany
- Taipei, Taiwan
- Taoyuan, Taiwan
- Tirana, Albania
- Ulm, Germany
- Vienna, Austria
- Zagreb, Croatia (Note: In 2021, Tomislav Tomašević, the mayor of Zagreb, Croatia, was invited to join.)

=== Joined in 2022 ===
- Berlin, Germany
- Brussels, Belgium
- Hamburg, Germany
- Kyiv, Ukraine
- Milan, Italy
- Riga, Latvia
- Rome, Italy
- Vilnius, Lithuania

=== Joined in 2023 ===
- Munich, Germany
- Lviv, Ukraine

=== Joined in 2024 ===
- Sofia, Bulgaria
- Kharkiv, Ukraine
- Reykjavík, Iceland

=== Joined in 2025 ===
- Timișoara, Romania

=== Joined in 2026 ===
- (United States) Beaverton, Oregon
- (United States) Boston, Massachusetts
- (United States) Chicago, Illinois
- (United States) Cincinnati, Ohio
- (United States) Cleveland, Ohio
- (United States) Montgomery, Alabama
- (United States) Oklahoma City, Oklahoma
- (United States) San Antonio, Texas
- (United States) San Diego, California
- (United States) Seattle, Washington
