= Nordic Defence Cooperation =

Defense collaboration among the Nordic countries

- Formation: 4 November 2009
- Type: International organisation
- Members: 5 states: Denmark; Finland; Iceland; Norway; Sweden
- Website: http://www.nordefco.org

The Nordic Defence Cooperation (NORDEFCO) is a collaboration among the Nordic countries in the area of defence. Its five members are Denmark, Finland, Iceland, Norway, and Sweden.

The organization aims to strengthen the member countries' defence capabilities by identifying areas for cooperation and promoting effective solutions. The memorandum of understanding was signed in Helsinki on November 4, 2009, succeeding the Nordic Supportive Defence Structures (NORDSUP), the Nordic armaments cooperation (NORDAC) and the Nordic Coordinated Arrangement for Military Peace Support (NORDCAPS), previous parallel cooperative arrangements.

Participation in the NORDEFCO is voluntary and states can choose which areas they want to collaborate within and to what extent. This means that cooperation can occur bilaterally and among all five members. It is also considered within the organizational scope to work with non-Nordic countries in fields where there is an added value to doing so. According to the official webpage, the cooperation is based on the conviction that there is much to be gained through cost sharing, joint solutions, and joint actions.

== Limitations ==
Practical Nordic and Scandinavian defence cooperation has been impeded by their differing memberships:

Membership of the principal European and Western defence arrangements
	European Union	North Atlantic Treaty Organization	Organisation for Joint Armament Cooperation	Finabel
Denmark	Yes	Yes	No	No
Finland	Yes	Yes	Partial	Yes
Iceland	No	Yes	No	No
Norway	Partial (non-voting participation in the European Defence Agency of the EU's Common Security and Defence Policy)	Yes	No	Yes
Sweden	Yes	Yes	Partial	Yes

== Organization ==
The official presidency of the organization rotates among the member states, but the Nordic Ministers of Defence are ultimately responsible for NORDEFCO; they meet twice a year. They preside over the Nordic Defence Policy Steering Committee, composed of senior departmental officers from the member countries. Underneath this committee is the Nordic Military Coordination Committee, composed of flag officers who represent the member countries' Chiefs of Defence.

The areas of cooperation (COPAs) are divided into five sections:

- Strategic Development (COPA SD)
- Capabilities (COPA CAPA)
- Human Resources & Education (COPA HR&E)
- Training & Exercises (COPA TR&EX)
- Operations (COPA OPS)

These are staffed with senior officers from the participating countries and mandated to further coordinate and implement the given tasks. The recommendations reported back from the COPAs also form the basis for the decisions made by the Nordic Defence Policy Steering Committee and the Nordic Military Coordination Committee.

In addition to the Cooperation Areas, Acquisition & Life Cycle Support (ALCS) is tasked with coordinating and facilitating armaments relating to cooperation issues. This is performed through a yearly screening process, where all participating nations provide input from their procurement plans. The plans are compared, screened, and cooperation possibilities, vetted by ALCS, are identified. If considered suitable for further cooperation, established formally as a Subgroup. These Subgroups comprise experts from the participating nations, and are tasked with establishing the foundations for how cooperation can happen, for instance, gearing towards a common procurement project. Historically, such cooperation has enabled the Nordic nations to take advantage of upwards of €60 million in cost savings.

== Nordic Combat Uniform ==
Wanting a more integrated military in the Nordic countries, the Nordic militaries began a search for a shared Nordic Combat Uniform (NCU), including all clothing from underwear to jacket. The countries each provided a list of demands to suppliers, wanting customization and ability to easily modify them for a wide range of climates. Following a series of tests, a system was chosen and the first orders made in 2022. While the clothing systems are the same, each country uses its camouflage pattern.

== Mutual defence ==
NORDEFCO has not generally been seen as a mutual defence pact and it is not regarded as a command structure, but its members have increasingly added features that show some resemblance to a defence pact. In 2021, the defence ministers of Denmark, Norway and Sweden signed an agreement of increased cooperation among their militaries with a coordination structure that would make it easier to "act together in peace, crisis or conflict" in the southern Nordic region, and in 2022 it was agreed to further enhance the capabilities by allowing access to each other's airspace and military infrastructure. A similar agreement for the northern Nordic region already existed between Finland, Norway and Sweden, which was further updated in 2022. Following Finland's and Sweden's request to join NATO in 2022, Denmark, Iceland and Norway released a statement saying that in the case of an attack on Finland or Sweden before they had become part of NATO, all necessary means would be used to help in their defence.

== See also ==
- Finland–NATO relations
- Sweden–NATO relations
- Common Security and Defence Policy of the European Union
- Craiovia Group
- Nordic Council
- Scandinavism
- Central European Defence Cooperation
- Open Balkan
