= Slavkov Declaration =

Czech-Slovak-Austrian cooperative grouping

The countries participating in the Austerlitz format. (From North to South: Czech Republic, Slovakia, Austria.)

The Austerlitz format, or Slavkov format, also "North-Trilateral" or "Slavkov trilateral", is a loose cooperation between Czech Republic, Slovakia and Austria.

== Name ==
The name derives from the South Moravian town of Slavkov u Brna, in the German language historically called Austerlitz, which is known as the site of the Battle of the Three Emperors of 1805.

== History ==
On the 15 February 1991 the Visegrád Group was formed as a cultural and political cooperation between the central European countries of Poland, Czech Republic, Slovakia and Hungary, and there was a push to expand this group to include Slovenia and Austria.

On 3 April 2014, the Czech President Miloš Zeman announced at a press conference in Ljubljana that Slovenia and Austria will also participate in the meetings of an enlarged Visegrád group in the future. However, the next day, Hungarian Ministry of Foreign Affairs by his spokesman, Gábor Kaleta, stated that an expansion of the Visegrád Group is not planned, thus rejecting Zeman's offer to Slovenia and Austria.

Apart from Hungary's reluctance to include Slovenia and Austria in the Visegrád Group, the different points of view regarding the Russian sanctions in the wake of the Russo-Ukrainian War that had begun in 2014 on one hand and the three states of the Czech Republic, Slovakia and Austria on the other proved to be an obstacle for an expansion of the Visegrád group. It was therefore necessary to find a different framework for enhanced cooperation. On January 29, 2015, the Prime Minister of Czech Republic Bohuslav Sobotka and Slovakia Robert Fico and the Austrian Chancellor Werner Faymann came together in Slavkov u Brna, Austerlitz near Brno. The 'Austerlitz Declaration' was signed and the Austerlitz framework for mutual co-operation was launched.

Petr Drulák, the deputy minister of the Czech Republic, emphasized that the Austerlitz framework was not a competitor, but a complement to the Visegrád group.

On 22 April 2026, Hungarian politician Peter Magyar proposed merging the Visegrad group with the Slavkov format.
