= List of countries by inequality-adjusted Human Development Index =

World map showing more detailed breakdown of countries by inequality-adjusted Human Development Index (based on 2023 data, published in 2025): 0.900–0.950 0.850–0.899 0.800–0.849 0.750–0.799 0.700–0.749 0.650–0.699 / 0.600–0.649 0.550–0.599 0.500–0.549 0.450–0.499 0.400–0.449 / 0.350–0.399 0.300–0.349 0.250–0.299 0.200–0.249 Data unavailable

This is a list of countries by inequality-adjusted Human Development Index (IHDI), as published by the United Nations Development Programme (UNDP) in its 2025 Human Development Report. According to the 2016 Report, "The IHDI can be interpreted as the level of human development when inequality is accounted for", whereas the Human Development Index itself, from which the IHDI is derived, is "an index of potential human development (or the maximum IHDI that could be achieved if there were no inequality)".

== Methodology ==
The index reduces the HDI by the Atkinson index with inequality aversion parameter ϵ of 1 according to the inequality of the distribution of health, education and income. Under perfect equality, the HDI and IHDI are equal; the greater the difference between the two, the greater the inequality.

The IHDI, estimated for the world and specific countries, captures the losses in human development due to inequality in health, education and income. Losses in all three dimensions vary across countries, ranging from just a few percent (e.g. Czech Republic and Slovenia) up to over 40% (e.g. Angola and Comoros). Overall loss takes into account all three dimensions.

== List ==
The table below ranks countries according to their inequality-adjusted human development index (IHDI). Data is based on 2023 estimates.

=== 2023 inequality-adjusted HDI (IHDI) (2025 report) ===
Table of countries by IHDI
Rank	Country	2023 estimates (2025 report)		
Rank	Country	IHDI	HDI	Overall loss (%) due to inequality
1	Iceland	0.923	0.972	5.0
2	Norway	0.909	0.970	6.3
2	Denmark	0.909	0.962	5.5
4	Switzerland	0.894	0.970	7.8
5	Netherlands	0.892	0.955	6.6
6	Belgium	0.891	0.951	6.3
6	Finland	0.891	0.948	6.0
8	Germany	0.890	0.959	7.2
9	Sweden	0.886	0.959	7.6
9	Ireland	0.886	0.949	6.6
11	Slovenia	0.885	0.931	4.9
12	Australia	0.873	0.958	8.9
13	United Kingdom	0.869	0.946	8.1
14	Canada	0.867	0.939	7.7
14	Czechia	0.867	0.915	5.2
16	United Arab Emirates	0.866	0.940	7.9
17	Austria	0.861	0.930	7.4
18	South Korea	0.857	0.937	8.5
19	New Zealand	0.853	0.938	9.1
20	Japan	0.845	0.925	8.6
21	Malta	0.843	0.924	8.8
22	Cyprus	0.841	0.913	7.9
22	Estonia	0.841	0.905	7.1
24	Hong Kong	0.839	0.955	12.1
25	Luxembourg	0.838	0.922	9.1
26	Andorra	0.837	0.913	8.3
27	France	0.836	0.920	9.1
28	Slovakia	0.833	0.880	5.3
29	United States	0.832	0.938	11.3
30	Croatia	0.828	0.889	6.9
31	Greece	0.825	0.908	9.1
32	Singapore	0.823	0.946	13.0
33	Spain	0.819	0.918	10.8
33	Hungary	0.819	0.870	5.9
35	Italy	0.817	0.915	10.7
35	Poland	0.817	0.906	9.8
37	Israel	0.813	0.919	11.5
38	Lithuania	0.812	0.895	9.3
38	Latvia	0.812	0.889	8.7
40	Portugal	0.795	0.890	10.7
41	Serbia	0.772	0.833	7.3
42	Montenegro	0.771	0.862	10.6
42	Belarus	0.771	0.824	6.4
44	Kazakhstan	0.766	0.837	8.5
45	Argentina	0.761	0.865	12.0
46	Romania	0.758	0.845	10.3
46	Russia	0.758	0.832	8.9
48	Brunei	0.756	0.837	9.7
49	Seychelles	0.755	0.848	11.0
50	Georgia	0.754	0.844	10.7
51	Oman	0.750	0.858	12.6
52	Bulgaria	0.748	0.845	11.5
53	Uruguay	0.747	0.862	13.3
54	Armenia	0.743	0.811	8.4
55	Azerbaijan	0.735	0.789	6.8
56	Chile	0.723	0.878	17.7
56	North Macedonia	0.723	0.815	11.3
58	Moldova	0.719	0.785	8.4
59	Ukraine	0.715	0.779	8.2
60	Turkey	0.708	0.853	17.0
61	Malaysia	0.707	0.819	13.7
62	Albania	0.705	0.810	13.0
63	Bosnia and Herzegovina	0.689	0.804	14.3
64	Tonga	0.682	0.769	11.3
65	Costa Rica	0.678	0.833	18.6
66	Thailand	0.677	0.798	15.2
67	Bahamas	0.670	0.820	18.3
67	China	0.670	0.797	15.9
69	Mauritius	0.669	0.806	17.0
70	Panama	0.664	0.839	20.9
71	Kyrgyzstan	0.649	0.720	9.9
72	Mongolia	0.647	0.747	13.4
73	Mexico	0.646	0.789	18.1
74	Iran	0.643	0.799	19.5
75	Vietnam	0.641	0.766	16.3
76	Ecuador	0.640	0.777	17.6
77	Jordan	0.637	0.754	15.5
78	Dominican Republic	0.634	0.776	18.3
79	Peru	0.633	0.794	20.3
80	Sri Lanka	0.630	0.776	18.8
81	Marshall Islands	0.626	0.733	14.6
81	Fiji	0.626	0.731	14.4
83	Barbados	0.620	0.811	23.6
84	Palau	0.616	0.786	21.6
85	Samoa	0.609	0.708	14.0
86	Indonesia	0.608	0.728	16.5
87	Venezuela	0.605	0.709	14.7
88	Maldives	0.602	0.766	21.4
89	Algeria	0.601	0.763	21.2
90	Paraguay	0.599	0.756	20.8
90	Nauru	0.599	0.703	14.8
92	Philippines	0.597	0.720	17.1
93	Tunisia	0.595	0.746	20.2
94	Brazil	0.594	0.786	24.4
94	Tajikistan	0.594	0.691	14.0
96	Colombia	0.593	0.788	24.7
	World	0.590	0.756	22.0
97	Jamaica	0.590	0.720	18.1
98	Egypt	0.582	0.754	22.8
99	Bolivia	0.578	0.733	21.1
99	Tuvalu	0.578	0.689	16.1
101	Gabon	0.558	0.733	23.9
102	El Salvador	0.555	0.678	18.1
103	Palestine	0.538	0.674	20.2
104	Nicaragua	0.535	0.706	24.2
104	Kiribati	0.535	0.644	16.9
106	Iraq	0.534	0.695	23.2
107	Saint Lucia	0.523	0.748	30.1
108	Vanuatu	0.521	0.621	16.1
109	Morocco	0.517	0.710	27.2
110	Botswana	0.509	0.731	30.4
111	Honduras	0.496	0.645	23.1
112	Solomon Islands	0.483	0.584	17.3
113	Bangladesh	0.482	0.685	29.6
114	Guatemala	0.479	0.662	27.6
115	Bhutan	0.478	0.698	31.5
115	Cabo Verde	0.478	0.668	28.4
115	São Tomé and Príncipe	0.478	0.637	25.0
118	Myanmar	0.477	0.609	21.7
119	South Africa	0.476	0.741	35.8
120	India	0.475	0.685	30.7
121	Laos	0.462	0.617	25.1
122	Kenya	0.456	0.628	27.4
123	Timor-Leste	0.451	0.634	28.9
124	Cambodia	0.444	0.606	26.7
125	Namibia	0.438	0.665	34.1
126	Nepal	0.437	0.622	29.7
127	Eswatini	0.431	0.695	38.0
128	Republic of the Congo	0.426	0.649	34.4
129	Papua New Guinea	0.423	0.576	26.6
130	Zimbabwe	0.406	0.598	32.1
131	Uganda	0.400	0.582	31.3
132	Ghana	0.399	0.628	36.5
132	Rwanda	0.399	0.578	31.0
134	Tanzania	0.391	0.555	29.5
135	Nigeria	0.379	0.560	32.3
136	Mauritania	0.374	0.563	33.6
137	Malawi	0.365	0.517	29.4
138	Pakistan	0.364	0.544	33.1
139	Togo	0.363	0.571	36.4
140	Zambia	0.361	0.595	39.3
140	Cameroon	0.361	0.588	38.6
142	Angola	0.360	0.616	41.6
143	Lesotho	0.357	0.550	35.1
144	Comoros	0.356	0.603	41.0
145	Côte d'Ivoire	0.350	0.582	39.9
146	Democratic Republic of the Congo	0.341	0.522	34.7
146	Djibouti	0.341	0.513	33.5
148	Senegal	0.340	0.530	35.8
149	Haiti	0.337	0.554	39.2
150	Guinea-Bissau	0.331	0.514	35.6
151	Gambia	0.329	0.524	37.2
152	Sudan	0.328	0.511	35.8
153	Liberia	0.326	0.510	36.1
153	Ethiopia	0.326	0.497	34.4
155	Yemen	0.325	0.470	30.9
156	Afghanistan	0.321	0.496	35.3
157	Madagascar	0.319	0.487	34.5
158	Benin	0.316	0.515	38.6
159	Guinea	0.302	0.500	39.6
160	Mozambique	0.297	0.493	39.8
161	Burundi	0.286	0.439	34.9
162	Mali	0.281	0.419	32.9
162	Sierra Leone	0.281	0.467	39.8
164	Burkina Faso	0.273	0.459	40.5
165	Niger	0.265	0.419	36.8
166	Central African Republic	0.253	0.414	38.9
167	Chad	0.252	0.416	39.4
168	Somalia	0.229	0.404	43.3
169	South Sudan	0.226	0.388	41.8

== See also ==
- Economic inequality
- Human Development Report
- List of countries by Human Development Index
- List of countries by income equality
- List of countries by planetary pressures–adjusted Human Development Index
- List of countries by share of income of the richest one percent
- Median income
- Per capita income
- Poverty
- Social Progress Index
- Social inequality
- Welfare's effect on poverty
- Douglas A. Hicks
