= Eastern Hemisphere =

Half of Earth which lies east of the prime meridian

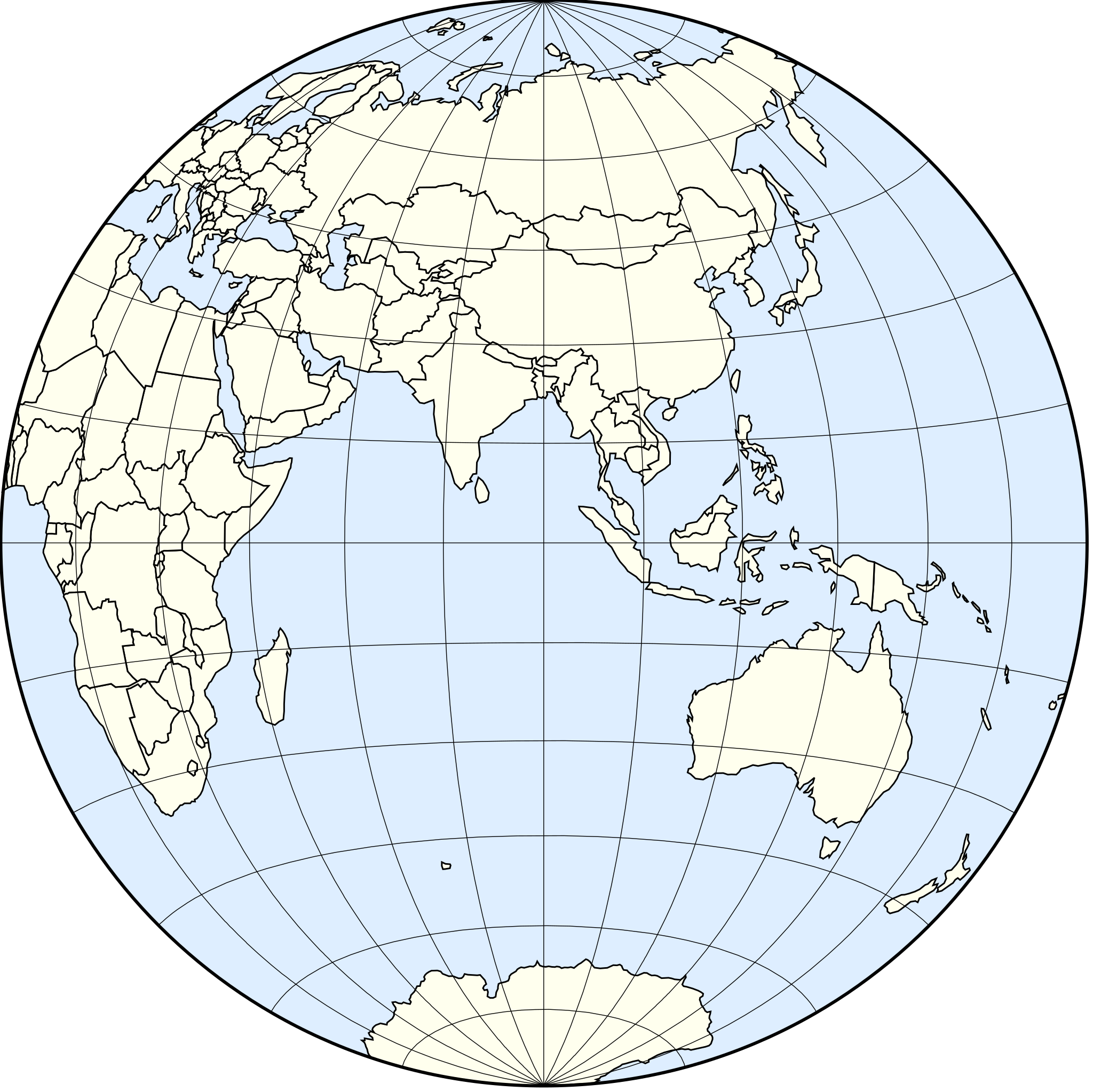
Eastern Hemisphere

The Eastern Hemisphere is the half of the planet Earth which is east of the prime meridian (which crosses Greenwich, London, United Kingdom) and west of the antimeridian (which crosses the Pacific Ocean and relatively little land from pole to pole). It is also used to refer to Afro-Eurasia (Africa and Eurasia) and Australia, in contrast with the Western Hemisphere, which includes mainly North and South America. The Eastern Hemisphere may also be called the "Oriental Hemisphere", and may in addition be used in a cultural or geopolitical sense as a synonym for the European term, "Old World".

== Geography ==
The boundary line between the Western and Eastern Hemispheres is an almost perfect circle (the Earth is an oblate spheroid, i.e. wider around the equator). The position of this boundary line must be an arbitrary convention, unlike the equator (an imaginary line encircling Earth, equidistant from its poles, which divides the Northern and Southern hemispheres). The prime meridian at 0° longitude and the antimeridian, at 180° longitude, are the conventionally accepted boundaries, since they divide eastern longitudes from western longitudes. This convention was established in 1884 at the International Meridian Conference held in Washington, D.C., where the standard time concepts of Canadian railroad engineer Sir Sandford Fleming were adopted. The hemispheres agreed do not precisely correspond with continents. Portions of Western Europe, West Africa, Oceania, and extreme northeastern Russia are in the Western Hemisphere, in contrast to the split between the "Old World" and the "New World" or the Americas.

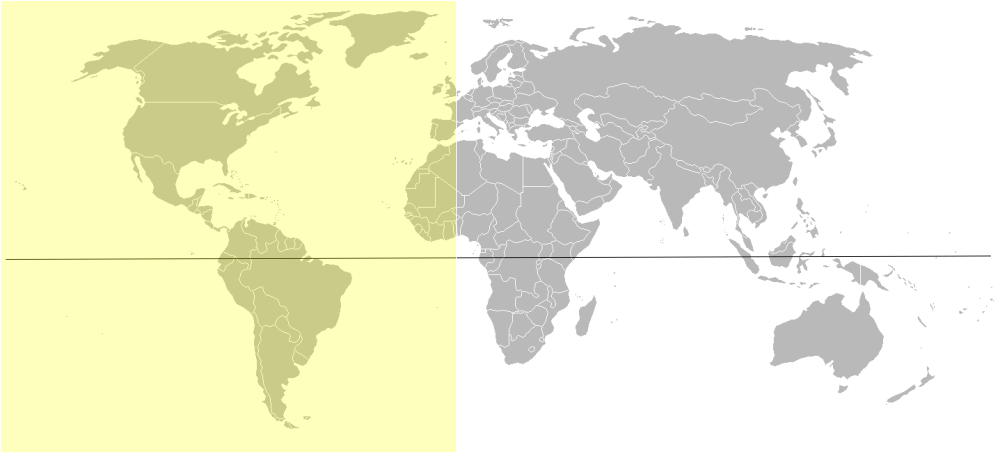
Countries in the Eastern Hemisphere, east of the prime meridian (shown not in yellow).

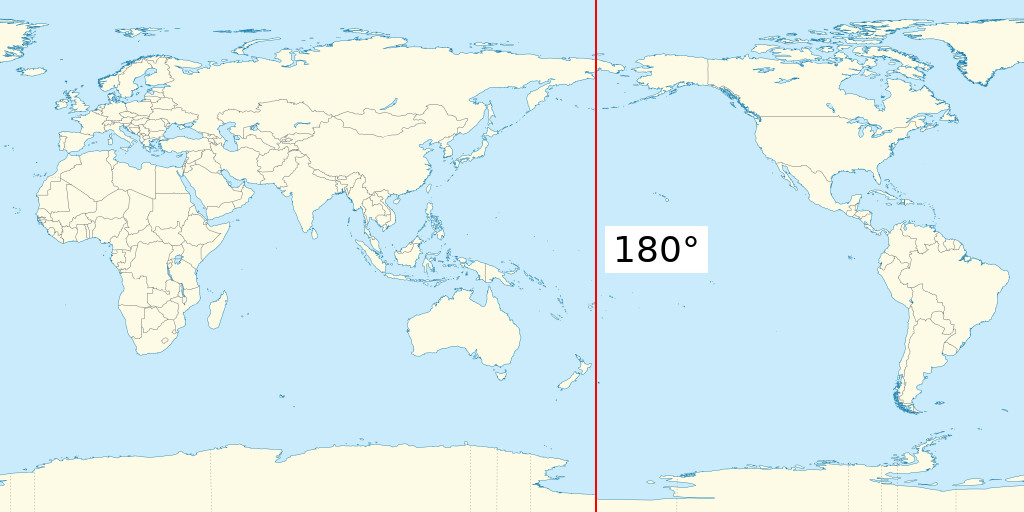
The 180th meridian on a Pacific-centered map of Earth.

Alternatively, meridians of 20°W and the diametrically opposed 160°E are sometimes used outside of matters of physics and navigation. This arrangement is preferred by some since it includes all of the European and African mainlands as part of the Eastern Hemisphere. However, it also includes a small portion of northeast Greenland (typically reckoned as part of North America) and excludes more of eastern Russia and Oceania (e.g., New Zealand's two main islands). Prior to the global adoption of standard time, numerous prime meridians were decreed by various countries where time was defined by local noon.

The Indian Ocean is the only ocean located entirely in the Eastern Hemisphere. The centre of the Eastern Hemisphere is located in the Indian Ocean at the intersection of the equator and the 90th meridian east, 910 km west of Indonesia in the Ninety East Ridge. The nearest land is Simeulue Island at 2°35′N 96°05′E.

The land mass of the Eastern Hemisphere is larger than that of the Western Hemisphere and has a wide variety of habitats. The center of all the land of the Eastern Hemisphere (excluding Antarctica) has been located at 30°00′00″N 62°15′00″E in southern Afghanistan. Even though Russia has the largest amount of total land in the Eastern Hemisphere, the largest country entirely in the Eastern Hemisphere is China at 9,596,961 km^{2}.

=== Countries in the Eastern Hemisphere ===
18 independent countries entirely in the Eastern Hemisphere have no land borders with other countries: Australia, Comoros, Federated States of Micronesia, Japan, Madagascar, Maldives, Malta, Marshall Islands, Mauritius, Nauru, Palau, Philippines, São Tomé and Príncipe, Seychelles, Solomon Islands, Sri Lanka, Tuvalu and Vanuatu. Fiji, Kiribati and New Zealand, which have land in both the Eastern and Western Hemisphere, are also borderless countries, while Brunei, Cyprus, Indonesia, Papua New Guinea and Timor-Leste are considered divided island countries, as they have land borders. The United Kingdom is another divided island country, though most of the country is in the Western Hemisphere. Bahrain and Singapore have no natural land borders, but are connected to Saudi Arabia and Malaysia by man-made bridges and causeways.

39 of Africa's 54 independent countries are entirely in the Eastern Hemisphere: the five largest are DR Congo at 2,345,409 km^{2}, Sudan at 1,886,068 km^{2}, Libya at 1,759,541 km^{2}, Chad at 1,280,000 km^{2} and Niger at 1,267,000 km^{2}.

When Sudan and South Sudan split into separate countries in 2011, Algeria became the largest country in Africa at 2,381,741 km^{2}, and it straddles the prime meridian, with the greater proportion of its land being east of the prime meridian. Aside from Algeria, four additional African countries have land in both the Eastern and Western Hemispheres, and another ten are entirely in the Western Hemisphere.

34 of Europe's 44 independent countries are entirely in the Eastern Hemisphere, and besides Russia, all countries associated with the Eastern Europe region are entirely in the Eastern Hemisphere. Seven European countries are partially in the Eastern Hemisphere, and three are entirely in the Western Hemisphere (those being Iceland, Ireland and Portugal). The five largest European countries entirely in the Eastern Hemisphere are Ukraine at 603,628 km^{2}, Sweden at 450,295 km^{2}, Germany at 357,022 km^{2}, Finland at 338,455 km^{2} and Poland at 312,696 km^{2}. Norway is larger than Germany, Finland and Poland at 385,207 km^{2}, though it has land in the Western Hemisphere, as the remote island of Jan Mayen is west of the prime meridian. Mainland France straddles the prime meridian, but the majority of the country's 543,940 km^{2} total land area in Europe is east of the prime meridian. The majority of Spain's 506,030 km^{2} total land area is west of the prime meridian.

Most Polynesian islands are entirely in the Western Hemisphere, including the countries of Samoa and Tonga and various semi-independent territories. However, no countries or territories in the neighboring regions of Melanesia and Micronesia are entirely in the Western Hemisphere, and only Fiji (Melanesia) and Kiribati (Micronesia) have any land in the Western Hemisphere.

== Temperature records ==
=== Low temperatures ===
The majority of Antarctica's lowest recorded temperatures have been recorded in the larger Eastern Hemisphere portion. The lowest temperature ever recorded in the Eastern Hemisphere and the Southern Hemisphere was a −89.2 °C (−128.6 °F) reading at Antarctica's Vostok Station on July 21, 1983. This is also the lowest temperature ever recorded on earth. Outside of Antarctica, the lowest temperature ever recorded in the Western Hemisphere was a −69.6 °C (−93.3 °F) reading at the Klinck Automatic Weather Station in Greenland on December 22, 1991. This is also the lowest temperature ever recorded in the Northern Hemisphere. Byrd Automatic Weather Station is situated in the Western Hemisphere portion of Antarctica and recorded a −64.4 °C (−83.9 °F) reading on July 18, 1985.

=== High temperatures ===
The 56.7 °C (134 °F) temperature recorded in Death Valley, California on July 10, 1913, is the highest temperature ever recorded in the Northern Hemisphere and also in the Western Hemisphere. It is also the highest temperature ever recorded on earth. A 55.0 °C (131 °F) temperature recorded in Kebili, Tunisia, on July 7, 1931, is the second highest temperature ever recorded on Earth, and the highest in the Eastern Hemisphere. However, some weather historians question its accuracy. A 1922 reading of 58 °C (136.4 °F) in El Azizia, Libya, was long cited as the world record before the World Meteorological Organization decertified it in 2012 due to measurement errors. The Southern Hemisphere's highest recorded temperature is tied at 50.7 °C (123.3 °F) between Oodnadatta, South Australia on January 2, 1960, and Onslow, Western Australia on January 13, 2022.

The Italian island of Sicily is east of the prime meridian and recorded a 48.8 °C (119.8 °F) temperature on August 11, 2021, the highest associated with Europe. Mitribah, Kuwait recorded a temperature of 53.9 °C (129.0 °F) on July 21, 2016, which briefly became the highest associated with Asia and the entirety of Eurasia. Ahvaz, Iran recorded a 54 °C (129.2 °F) temperature on June 29, 2017, which remains the current record for Asia and Eurasia.

== Zoology ==
Animals exclusively occurring in the Eastern Hemisphere include those associated with regions such as Australasia, East Asia, South Asia and Southeast Asia, like kangaroos, kiwis, koalas, pandas, orangutans and various species of tigers. Some African animals such as chimpanzees occur both east and west of the prime meridian in Africa, although giraffes, gorillas and zebras only occur in the Eastern Hemisphere portion. Bald eagles, the national symbol of the United States, can on rare occasion be found in the Eastern Hemisphere towards the end of Alaska's Aleutian Islands chain, which stretches across the North Pacific Ocean. While penguins are nearly exclusive to Antarctic-influenced regions of the Southern Hemisphere, they are widely found in both the Eastern and Western Hemispheres. Likewise, polar bears, which are exclusive to Arctic-influenced regions of the Northern Hemisphere, can be found in both the Eastern and Western Hemispheres.

== Oceanography ==
=== Atlantic Ocean ===
The open Atlantic Ocean lies predominantly in the Western Hemisphere. One of the few Atlantic islands in the Eastern Hemisphere is Bouvet Island, a remote Norwegian volcanic island at 54°S 3°E in the southern Atlantic; it is one of the most isolated islands on earth and is largely covered by glaciers. The Mediterranean Sea, a marginal sea of the North Atlantic, is almost entirely in the Eastern Hemisphere, and some of its major islands include France's Corsica, Greece's Crete, Spain's Mallorca, Italy's Sardinia and Sicily, Cyprus and Malta. Malta occupies a position between Sicily and the North African nations of Libya and Tunisia. Malta and Sicily are both geologically part of the African Plate rather than the Eurasian Plate. All of these islands are commonly grouped as Mediterranean islands rather than being grouped with open Atlantic islands.

=== Indian Ocean ===
The Indian Ocean's islands range from large continental landmasses to coral atolls and volcanic islands. The continental Madagascar lies off southeastern Africa, while Sri Lanka lies just south of India. Like Australia, Madagascar has many endemic animals, owing to its unique geological history. Further into the Indian Ocean are islands of volcanic geological origin. These include Mauritius, the Maldives, Réunion, the Kerguelen Islands and Australia's remote Heard Island and McDonald Islands, which contains Australia's only active volcano. Heard Island and McDonald Islands and the Kerguelen Islands are surrounded by cold sub-Antarctic waters, but are well north of Antarctica. The Cocos (Keeling) Islands are low coral atolls of volcanic origin, while Christmas Island is the emergent summit of a submarine mountain with a narrow fringing reef. The Seychelles are particularly diverse, with ancient granitic islands in the Inner Islands and low coralline islands in the Outer Islands, rather than forming a single volcanic chain like Mauritius. The volcanic North Sentinel Island is part of India's wider Andaman and Nicobar Islands, and is known for its hostile native population, who have had virtually no contact with the outside world since the earliest documentation of the island. The language and culture of the North Sentinelese are considered to be almost entirely unknown to outsiders.

=== Pacific Ocean ===
The Eastern Hemisphere includes the western portion of the Pacific Ocean, and some central portions. The Western Hemisphere has more remote sections of the Pacific Ocean, with some areas being devoid of islands for thousands of kilometers. The Australian mainland borders the Indian Ocean to the west, and the South Pacific and its marginal seas to the east, with the Great Barrier Reef being part of Australia's Pacific coast. Some parts of Australia's northern coast connect to South Pacific seas, while other parts of the northern coast connect to Indian Ocean seas. Australia is sometimes described as an "island continent" because it is a large landmass surrounded by ocean, rather than by continents. Among Australians, the country is also considered to border the Southern Ocean to its south, although many non-Australian geographers consider the Southern Ocean to begin much closer to Antarctica, with these geographers considering Australia's south to be bordering the Indian Ocean rather than the Southern Ocean. Some geographers also do not recognize the Southern Ocean as a distinct ocean, and consider Antarctica to be bordering the southern extents of the Atlantic, Indian and Pacific oceans. Other large landmasses situated in the western Pacific and its seas include Tasmania, New Guinea, New Zealand's North Island and South Island, Borneo, Taiwan, China's Hainan, and the main islands of Japan, the Philippines and Indonesia. The latter three countries comprise extensive archipelagos extending across the western Pacific and adjacent seas; the Philippines alone consists of more than 7,600 islands.

Beyond these large islands, the western Pacific contains numerous smaller volcanic and coral island groups in Melanesia and Micronesia. Melanesia consists of Fiji, New Caledonia, the Solomon Islands, and Vanuatu, with New Guinea often being included in a cultural sense, despite being much larger. Micronesia includes the Mariana, Caroline, Marshall and Gilbert island groups, and encompasses the independent nations of the Federated States of Micronesia, Kiribati, Nauru, Palau, and the Marshall Islands, along with the U.S. overseas territories of Guam and the Northern Mariana Islands. Japan's territory also extends through several volcanic island arcs, including the Izu Islands, and the remote Bonin/Volcano Islands, while the Ryukyu Islands form a long volcanic chain between southern Japan and Taiwan. The volcanic islands of the western Pacific range from high volcanic islands to low coral atolls and typically support distinctive tropical and subtropical ecosystems.

The Indian Ocean and most of the tropical Pacific Ocean make up the Indo-Pacific bioregion. Areas like Northern Australia, Indonesia, Papua New Guinea, Taiwan, the Philippines and the islands of Melanesia and Micronesia all fall within this bioregion. Southern Australia, New Zealand and most of Japan do not fall within the Indo-Pacific bioregion, as they are not tropical areas. Japan's volcanic islands like the Ryukyu Islands are on the northern fringes of the bioregion. Some tropical areas of the Pacific in the Western Hemisphere still belong to the Indo-Pacific bioregion, including Hawaii, French Polynesia, Samoa and Tonga, although the tropical Pacific coast of Latin America is distinct.

Japan's northernmost island Hokkaido is known for its subarctic-influenced weather. Along with Japan, Russia also occupies land in the colder northwestern Pacific area. Sakhalin is a large Russian island between the Sea of Okhotsk and the Sea of Japan, and has significant mineral resources and oil/gas reserves. The Kuril Islands, another Russian possession, form a long volcanic chain extending from the Kamchatka Peninsula toward Hokkaido. Further north, Russia's Commander Islands form the westernmost geological segment of Alaska's Aleutian Islands arc. Despite being politically part of Russia, geological studies identify these islands as part of the Aleutian arc system. The Aleutian chain itself crosses the 180th meridian, placing some of its far-western islands technically in the Eastern Hemisphere despite their political association with Alaska. The Aleutian Islands and Russia's Pacific islands are often discussed in broader Arctic contexts rather than Pacific contexts, due to their different climates to the tropical islands of the Pacific.

=== Arctic Ocean ===
The Eastern Hemisphere portion of the Arctic Ocean contains numerous Russian island groups, including Novaya Zemlya, Severnaya Zemlya, the New Siberian Islands and Franz Josef Land, as well as Svalbard farther west under Norwegian sovereignty. Novaya Zemlya separates the Barents and Kara seas, Severnaya Zemlya lies between the Kara and Laptev seas, and Franz Josef Land forms one of the world's northernmost archipelagos. Wrangel Island, despite being Russian and lying in the Arctic Ocean, straddles the 180th meridian and therefore has land on both sides of the conventional Eastern–Western Hemisphere boundary.

== Human history ==
The majority of land in the Eastern Hemisphere is part of Afro-Eurasia, which is sometimes referred to as the "Old World", and whose people had varying cultural linkages for centuries. Modern humans reached Eurasia from Africa roughly 120,000 years ago, with influential cultures subsequently developing in regions such as Europe and the Middle East. Major Pacific landmasses in the Eastern Hemisphere like Australia, New Guinea, Indonesia, the Philippines and Japan were settled by humans roughly 65,000 to 40,000 years ago. Madagascar, New Zealand and the islands of Melanesia and Micronesia were among some of the more recently settled areas of the Eastern Hemisphere. Owing to their isolated locations, Australia, New Zealand, Melanesia and Micronesia had little contact with the peoples of Afro-Eurasia until the Age of Discovery beginning in the 16th century, similar to the Americas or the "New World". The more remote populations living in Southern Africa were also generally isolated until the Age of Discovery. Following the Age of Discovery, Australia, New Zealand and certain African states like South Africa received colonial settler populations from Europe, which disrupted the native populations, with this occurring on a much larger scale throughout the Americas. Israel is often regarded as another example of a colonial settler society in the Eastern Hemisphere, although it received settlers later than the aforementioned areas.

Areas in the Eastern Hemisphere which had no contact with humans until the Age of Discovery include the part of Antarctica in the Eastern Hemisphere, and certain remote islands, such as Bouvet Island, Christmas Island, Cocos (Keeling) Islands, Heard Island and McDonald Islands, the Kerguelen Islands, Lord Howe Island, Mauritius, Seychelles, Svalbard, the Volcano Islands and Wake Island. The Bonin Islands were discovered uninhabited in 1543, however, they are theorized to have possibly had contact with Micronesians before this. Islands which were seemingly uninhabited before the Age of Discovery, like the Bonin Islands, Christmas Island and Lord Howe Island, developed high levels of endemism in their ecosystem due to their remoteness and lack of human interference. Mauritius was the only place in the world with the unique dodo species, and it went extinct in 1662, following human discovery of the island. Christmas Island, Cocos (Keeling) Islands and Lord Howe Island are currently part of Australia and eventually received small human populations, as did the now Japanese-administered Bonin Islands. Mauritius and Seychelles became their own independent countries in 1968 and 1976, and are some of the only nation states in the world without true Indigenous populations, along with a few others in the Western Hemisphere such as Cape Verde.

== Demographics and economy ==
82% of humans live in the Eastern Hemisphere, and 18% in the Western Hemisphere. The difference in population is less lopsided than that of the Northern Hemisphere and Southern Hemisphere, with 90% of humans living in the Northern Hemisphere, and only 10% in the Southern Hemisphere. In 2026, the states with the highest population density in the Eastern Hemisphere and the entire world were Macau and Monaco, which had 20,815 people and 18,333 people per kilometer. In 2026, the least densely populated states in the Eastern Hemisphere were Australia and Mongolia, which had 3 people and 2 people per kilometer. In 2025, Monaco had the highest life expectancy for both males and females in the Eastern Hemisphere and the entire world, with an average life expectancy of 84.6 years for males and 88.6 years for females. That year, Chad had the lowest life expectancy for males in the Eastern Hemisphere and the entire world (53.4 years), while Nigeria had the lowest life expectancy for females in the Eastern Hemisphere and the entire world (54.9 years).

The Eastern Hemisphere displays greater religious diversity than the Western Hemisphere, where the vast majority of countries are Christian (e.g. the whole Americas, Polynesian islands and the few European countries west of the prime meridian). Nearly all countries with Islam as the main religion are located in the Eastern Hemisphere, and the only Western Hemisphere countries with Islam as the main religion are the Northwestern African nations of Guinea, Guinea-Bissau, Ivory Coast, Mauritania, Morocco, Senegal, Sierra Leone and The Gambia. Islam is also the main religion in the African nations of Algeria, Burkina Faso and Mali, which straddle the prime meridian. Along with the European areas east of the prime meridian, Christianity is the most common religion in several Eastern Hemisphere areas with European colonial influence, such as Australasia, Melanesia, Micronesia, Southern Africa, the Philippines, and Timor-Leste. Israel has the largest Jewish population in the Eastern Hemisphere and the entire world, with 7,153,000 Jews living in the country in 2024. Other Eastern Hemisphere countries which rank high in global Jewish populations are Germany (125,000), Russia (123,000), Australia (117,000), South Africa (49,500) and Hungary (45,000). The majority of France's 438,500 Jews reside in the Eastern Hemisphere. India and Nepal are the only Hindu-majority countries in the world, and India has over a billion Hindus. Bangladesh, Pakistan and Indonesia have the three next highest total number of Hindus, although Islam is the majority religion in these countries. Mauritius has a 48% Hindu population. Most countries in Southeast Asia have Buddhist-majority populations. While Buddhism was historically a prominent religion in East Asia, the majority of the modern populations in East Asian countries do not follow any religion.

In 2016, the top 25 most visited cities entirely in the Eastern Hemisphere were Bangkok, Paris, Dubai, Singapore, Kuala Lumpur, Istanbul, Tokyo, Seoul, Hong Kong, Barcelona, Amsterdam, Milan, Taipei, Rome, Osaka, Vienna, Shanghai, Prague, Munich, Berlin, Mumbai, Riyadh, Chennai, Beijing and Sydney. Bangkok was the most visited city in the world in 2016. In 2025, countries entirely in the Eastern Hemisphere with the highest GDPs were China, Germany and Japan, while the Eastern Hemisphere countries with the lowest GDPs were the Marshall Islands, Nauru and Tuvalu (which had the lowest GDP in the world in 2025).

=== Currency ===
In the Eastern Hemisphere, countries and territories use national currencies, share regional currencies or monetary systems, or use the currency of another country. The euro is used in Austria, Belgium, Bulgaria, Croatia, Cyprus, Estonia, Finland, France, Germany, Greece, Italy, Latvia, Lithuania, Luxembourg, Malta, the Netherlands, Slovakia and Slovenia. It is also used by Andorra, Monaco, San Marino, and Vatican City, which have formal monetary agreements with the EU allowing them to issue their own euro coins. Meanwhile, Kosovo and Montenegro adopted the euro as their national currency without an official EU agreement. Other European currencies include the Albanian lek, Belarusian ruble, Bosnia and Herzegovina convertible mark, Czech koruna, Danish krone, Hungarian forint, Liechtenstein and Swiss francs, Moldovan leu, Norwegian krone, Polish złoty, Romanian leu, Russian ruble, Serbian dinar, Swedish krona and Ukrainian hryvnia. Within Spain's Eastern Hemisphere portion, Barcelona, Catalonia, Mallorca and the parts of the Valencian Community east of the prime meridian use the euro. In the United Kingdom's Eastern Hemisphere portion, Cambridge, Essex, Ipswich, Kent, Norwich and the parts of London and Sussex east of the prime meridian use the pound sterling. Finland's autonomous Åland region uses the euro.

Asian and Middle Eastern currencies include the Afghan afghani, Armenian dram, Azerbaijani manat, Bahraini dinar, Bangladeshi taka, Bhutanese ngultrum, Brunei dollar, Cambodian riel, Chinese yuan, Georgian lari, Indian rupee, Indonesian rupiah, Iranian rial, Iraqi dinar, Israeli new shekel, Japanese yen, Jordanian dinar, Kazakhstani tenge, Kuwaiti dinar, Kyrgyzstani som, Lao kip, Lebanese pound, Malaysian ringgit, Maldivian rufiyaa, Mongolian tögrög, Myanmar kyat, Nepalese rupee, North Korean won, Omani rial, Pakistani rupee, Philippine peso, Qatari riyal, Saudi riyal, Singapore dollar, South Korean won, Sri Lankan rupee, Syrian pound, Tajikistani somoni, Thai baht, Turkmenistani manat, United Arab Emirates dirham, Uzbekistani sum, Vietnamese đồng, Yemeni rial and Turkish lira. Timor-Leste uses the United States dollar, while the Palestinian territories have no separate national currency and use the Israeli new shekel, Jordanian dinar and United States dollar. Among entitles politically associated with China, Hong Kong uses the Hong Kong dollar, Taiwan the new Taiwan dollar, and Macau the Macanese pataca.

African countries in the Eastern Hemisphere use a variety of national and shared currencies. These include the Algerian dinar, Angolan kwanza, Botswana pula, Burundian franc, Comorian franc, Congolese franc in the Democratic Republic of the Congo, Djiboutian franc, Egyptian pound, Eritrean nakfa, Ethiopian birr, Ghanaian cedi, Kenyan shilling, Libyan dinar, Malagasy ariary, Malawian kwacha, Mauritian rupee, Mozambican metical, Namibian dollar, Nigerian naira, Rwandan franc, Seychellois rupee, Somali shilling, South African rand, South Sudanese pound, Sudanese pound, Tanzanian shilling, Tunisian dinar, Ugandan shilling, Zambian kwacha and Zimbabwe Gold (ZiG). Benin and Niger use the West African CFA franc. The parts of Burkina Faso, Mali and Togo east of the prime meridian also use the West African CFA franc, as in the rest of each country. Cameroon, the Central African Republic, Chad, the Republic of the Congo, Equatorial Guinea and Gabon use the distinct Central African CFA franc. The two CFA franc currencies are issued by separate regional monetary authorities. The parts of Ghana east of the prime meridian use the Ghanaian cedi. Lesotho uses the loti, Eswatini the lilangeni, and Namibia the Namibian dollar; all three also have close monetary links with the South African rand.

In the Pacific, currencies include the Australian dollar, Fijian dollar, New Zealand dollar, Papua New Guinean kina, Solomon Islands dollar and Vanuatu vatu. Kiribati, Nauru and Tuvalu use the Australian dollar, while the Federated States of Micronesia, the Marshall Islands and Palau use the United States dollar. The United States dollar is also used in its overseas Pacific territories of Guam, the Northern Mariana Islands and Wake Island. The Aleutian Islands west of the 180th meridian are part of Alaska and use the United States dollar. The westernmost Aleutians are uninhabited aside from Shemya Island, which hosts Eareckson Air Station, where military and support personnel are based.

A number of other territories use the currency of their administering state. The Norwegian krone is associated with both Svalbard and Bouvet Island, although Bouvet Island is uninhabited. France's overseas territories Mayotte, New Caledonia and Réunion use the CFP franc, rather than the euro like mainland France. The Australian dollar is used in its external territories Christmas Island, the Cocos (Keeling) Islands and Norfolk Island. The Coral Sea Islands and Heard and McDonald Islands are Australian external territories which also use the Australian dollar, but Heard Island and McDonald Islands is uninhabited, while the Coral Sea Islands are uninhabited aside from meteorological staff on Willis Island.

=== Languages ===
English is the primary language in Australia, New Zealand and the Eastern Hemisphere portion of the United Kingdom. New Zealand also recognizes Māori and New Zealand Sign Language as official languages. Outside of English, Australia encompasses numerous Aboriginal and Torres Strait Islander languages, and the country has no official language. Anindilyakwa, Arrernte, Djambarrpuyngu, Pitjantjatjara, Tiwi, Warlpiri and Yolŋu Matha are among the Indigenous Australian languages spoken across the Northern Territory and Central Australia. Neighboring Papua New Guinea is even more linguistically varied than Australia, despite being smaller in size. It has over 800 languages, making it one of the most linguistically diverse countries in the world. English, Tok Pisin and Hiri Motu are among the most common languages. Micronesian islands and smaller islands in Melanesia mainly speak languages from the Micronesian language family and Melanesian language family. The principle language of Tuvalu is Tuvaluan, a Polynesian language, with English also being a joint official language. Tuvalu and New Zealand are the only Polynesian-speaking countries or territories in the Eastern Hemisphere, and Tuvalu is the only one entirely in the Eastern Hemisphere. English is now the administrative language in the Aleutian Islands west of the 180th meridian. These islands have been uninhabited by the Indigenous Aleut people since World War II, when Japan invaded them. Aleuts traditionally speak Aleut, also known as Unangam Tunuu, an endangered language with Eastern and Western dialects. Mednyj Aleut, a language influenced by Russian, developed in Russia's Commander Islands, which have ethnic ties to the Aleutian Islands. English has historically been used on the US-controlled Wake Island, which was discovered uninhabited by Europeans in 1568.

Spain and Equatorial Guinea are the only countries in the Eastern Hemisphere which have Spanish as a major language. Spain's Eastern Hemisphere portion also contains non-Spanish languages, including the Catalan language in Barcelona, Catalonia, the Valencian Community and the Balearic Islands (including Mallorca), and the Aranese language in northwestern Catalonia. Italian is spoken mainly in Italy and San Marino, while German is predominant in Germany, Austria and Liechtenstein. Both are also spoken in Switzerland. Dutch is used in the Netherlands and northern Belgium, while Luxembourgish, French and German are spoken in Luxembourg. French is also spoken in southern Belgium, and is the sole official language of France. South/Central Europe and Eastern Europe are home to numerous Slavic languages, such as Belarusian, Czech, Polish, Russian, Slovak and Ukrainian, and the South Slavic languages, including Bosnian, Bulgarian, Croatian, Macedonian, Montenegrin, Serbian, and Slovenian. Eastern and Southern European languages outside of the Slavic family include Albanian, Estonian, Greek, Hungarian, Latvian, Lithuanian, and Romanian. In Scandinavian Eastern Hemisphere countries, the principal languages are Danish, Finnish, Norwegian, and Swedish. Indigenous Sámi languages are also spoken across northern Norway, Sweden and Finland. Russian is the dominant language throughout Russia, although Siberia and the Russian Far East are also home to many Indigenous languages, including Buryat, Even, Evenki, Koryak, Nenets, Orok, Sakha (Yakut), and Tuvan. The Ainu language is associated with Japan's Hokkaido, and was historically spoken on the Kuril Islands and Sakhalin, but is now extinct on these Russian islands. Central Asia is characterized by Turkic languages, including Kazakh, Kyrgyz, Turkmen, and Uzbek, with the Indo-Iranian language Tajik also being spoken in Tajikistan. Russian also remains widely used in the region. The Caucasus is one of the most lingustically diverse areas in the world, with Armenian, Azerbaijani and Georgian among its principal languages, alongside Chechen, Ossetian and other regional languages. Turkish is dominant in Turkey, while Mongolian is spoken in Mongolia.

English, French and Portuguese are widely used in Africa's Eastern Hemisphere portion, alongside Indigenous languages. English is prominent in countries such as Ghana, Kenya, Nigeria, South Africa, and Uganda, while French is an official language or joint official language in Benin, Burundi, Cameroon, the Central African Republic, Chad, the Democratic Republic of Congo, Gabon, Madagascar, the Republic of the Congo, Rwanda, Seychelles and Togo. It was also formerly an official language of Burkina Faso, Mali and Niger, although these three countries removed it as an official language during the 2020s. Portuguese is an official language in the Eastern Hemisphere African nations of Angola, Mozambique and São Tomé and Príncipe. Arabic is the principal language across much of the Middle East and North Africa, including the Arabian Peninsula, Iraq, the Levant, Egypt and the Maghreb. It has several regional varieties and coexists with languages such as Hebrew, Persian and Kurdish. The Maltese language is related to Arabic but considered its own distinct language. South Asia contains several major language groups, including Bengali, Hindi, Punjabi, and Urdu, which are widely spoken across India, Bangladesh and Pakistan. Nepali is the official language of Nepal, while Afghanistan has two official languages, Dari (a variety of Persian) and Pashto. Mandarin Chinese is the principal language of China, alongside major regional languages such as Cantonese. Taiwan uses Mandarin, alongside minority languages and Indigenous Austronesian languages. Japanese is dominant in Japan, with Ryukyuan languages and the critically endangered Ainu representing minority languages. The Korean language is overwhelmingly dominant in both North Korea and South Korea, although linguistic differences have developed between these two countries since the 20th century. Southeast Asia has a wide range of languages, including Burmese, Khmer, Lao, Thai and Vietnamese on the mainland. Malay and Indonesian are widely spoken across the Malay Archipelago (including Borneo and Indonesia), while Filipino and other Philippine languages are used in the Philippines, with the colonial language of Spanish formerly being an official language. Spanish was also once a prominent colonial language in Micronesian islands, but in the Pacific the language is now restricted to islands in the Western Hemisphere which are adjacent to the Americas, such as Easter Island and the Galápagos Islands. Portuguese is an official language in the island nation of Timor-Leste, alongside the native Tetun. Portuguese is also one of the official languages in Macau, including the island of Coloane. However, most residents speak Cantonese, and the Portuguese language has declined since the end of Portuguese colonial rule.

=== Sports ===
Cricket is the most popular sport in highly populated South Asian countries, and also has a major following in several other Eastern Hemisphere countries, as well as in the United Kingdom. Eastern Hemisphere countries where the sport is prevalent include Afghanistan, Australia, Bangladesh, India, New Zealand, Pakistan, South Africa, Sri Lanka and Zimbabwe. Aside from the portion of the United Kingdom west of the prime meridian, the sport's popularity in the Western Hemisphere is mostly concentrated in English-speaking Caribbean countries like Jamaica. These Caribbean nations have their own composite side in international cricket known as the West Indies. Baseball's popularity is concentrated in the Western Hemisphere, particularly the United States, Canada, Cuba and the Dominican Republic, although it also has a sizable following in the Eastern Hemisphere with Japan, South Korea and Taiwan, where professional leagues and international competitions attract substantial audiences. Japan also has a distinctive sporting culture involving sumo wrestling, while martial arts such as judo, karate and taekwondo have significant followings across the East Asia region. Table tennis, also known as ping-pong, is the among the most popular sports in China, with an estimated 300 million players.

Association football is the dominant team sport across most of the Eastern Hemisphere, including the Middle East, Southeast Asia, Central Asia and the portions of Europe and Africa east of the prime meridian. Countries entirely or mostly in the Eastern Hemisphere have won 10 men's FIFA World Cup titles, with Germany and Italy having won four each, and France two. Two European countries mostly in the Western Hemisphere have also lifted the trophy, with the United Kingdom having won the tournament once, and Spain twice. Five Eastern Hemisphere countries have made the FIFA World Cup final while having never won it; Croatia, Hungary, the Netherlands, Sweden and Czechoslovakia (a former country comprising modern-day Czechia and Slovakia). Eastern Hemisphere football clubs have won the majority of UEFA Champions League tournaments, due to most European clubs being east of the prime meridian. Italy's AC Milan have won the second most UEFA Champions League titles at seven, while other Eastern Hemisphere clubs such as AFC Ajax, FC Bayern Munich, Inter Milan, Juventus FC and Paris Saint-Germain F.C. have also won the tournament on multiple occasions. FC Barcelona's home city is situated east of the prime meridian and it is the second most successful club in domestic Spanish football, having also won the UEFA Champions League five times. The home city of Real Madrid is west of the prime meridian, and it is the most successful club in the history of domestic Spanish football and the UEFA Champions League, having won the UEFA Champions League on 15 occasions. Several Western Hemisphere clubs from the United Kingdom and Portugal have also won the UEFA Champions League. Several countries associated with Asia and the Middle East compete in UEFA club and international competitions, including Armenia, Azerbaijan, Georgia, Israel, Turkey and Kazakhstan (who were Asian Football Confederation members until 2002). Israel were founding members of the AFC in 1954, but eventually left due to geopolitical tensions with neighboring Middle Eastern countries. In the 1980s and early 1990s, Israel competed in the Oceania Football Confederation, despite not being located in the Pacific, before joining UEFA in 1994. Taiwan, which is physically in the Pacific but close to East Asia, was formerly a member of the OFC rather than the AFC, due to geopolitical tensions with China. It rejoined the AFC in 1989, after 14 years in the OFC. Australia were a member of the OFC from its founding in 1966, but left the confederation for the AFC in 2006, partially due to a lack of competition from smaller Pacific island teams. Outside of sport, Australia and Israel also compete in the Eurovision singing contest, despite not being considered part of Europe, although during the 1970s Australia had also competed in a short-lived Pacific Rim singing contest known as the Pacific Song Contest.

Australian rules football is one of the Eastern Hemisphere's most distinctive sporting traditions. Originating in Australia during the nineteenth century, the sport is overwhelmingly concentrated in Australia, where it has particularly strong followings in Victoria, South Australia, Western Australia, Tasmania and the Northern Territory. Outside of Australia, the only country where Australian rules football is the national sport is Nauru, which was under Australian administration between 1914 and 1968. Nauru is also one of the only sovereign countries in the world which is not a member of FIFA, alongside other remote countries in Micronesia, including the Federated States of Micronesia, the Marshall Islands, Palau and Kiribati. Rugby union is prominent throughout certain parts of the Eastern Hemisphere, particularly Fiji, France, New Zealand, South Africa and Australia. New Zealand and South Africa are among the most successful nations in Rugby World Cup history. Rugby league is a distinct sport from rugby union, and it has a greater presence in Australia than rugby union does. In Australia, its popularity is primarily concentrated in the eastern states of New South Wales and Queensland, and it is also the most popular sport in Papua New Guinea. Additionally, New Zealand has an established rugby league tradition, despite rugby union being more popular in the country. Since 1995, New Zealand has had a club in Australia's National Rugby League competition, with a club from Papua New Guinea also set to join in 2028.

Tennis is a major international sport in which the Eastern Hemisphere, particularly Europe, has produced many of the world's most successful players. Players from the Eastern Hemisphere portion of Europe, such as Novak Djokovic of Serbia and Roger Federer of Switzerland, are among the most successful in the history of the sport. Spain's Rafael Nadal is another of the most successful players in the history of the sport, and he was born in the Eastern Hemisphere portion of the country, on the island of Mallorca. Slavic European countries have been especially influential in women's tennis. Prominent female European players include Poland's Iga Świątek, Belarus's Aryna Sabalenka and Victoria Azarenka, Russia's Anna Kournikova, Maria Sharapova, Svetlana Kuznetsova and Anastasia Myskina, and Czechia's Petra Kvitová, Barbora Krejčíková and Jana Novotná. Earlier generations included Czech-born Martina Navratilova, who won 18 Grand Slam singles titles while representing the United States, and Hana Mandlíková, who was born in Czechoslovakia before representing Australia. Serbia has also produced prominent women's players, including former world number ones Ana Ivanovic and Jelena Janković, while some of the most successful female European players outside of Slavic countries include Germany's Steffi Graf, Belgium's Justine Henin and Switzerland's Martina Hingis. The sport's popularity in the Eastern Hemisphere extends beyond Europe, particularly through Australia, which has produced many successful players, including Rod Laver, Margaret Court, Pat Cash, Pat Rafter, Lleyton Hewitt and Ashleigh Barty. East Asian tennis has also achieved moderate success through players such as Japan's Naomi Osaka and China's Li Na. The geographical distribution of the four Grand Slam tournaments is evenly divided between the Eastern and Western hemispheres: the Australian Open in Melbourne and the French Open in Paris are held in the Eastern Hemisphere, while the US Open in New York and Wimbledon in London are held in the Western Hemisphere. Wimbledon's All England Club is located just west of the prime meridian, at approximately 0°12′52″W.

== Countries and territories in the Eastern Hemisphere ==
=== Sovereign states in both hemispheres ===
Below is a list of the sovereign states in both the Western and Eastern hemispheres on the IERS Reference Meridian:

==== Mostly in the Eastern Hemisphere (with some land west of prime meridian) ====
- Denmark, due to the entirety of Greenland and the Faroe Islands. Denmark proper lies entirely within the Eastern Hemisphere. The default geographical coordinates for Denmark are 56°N 10°E, per the centroid of the country.
- Norway, due only to Jan Mayen. Mainland Norway, Svalbard and Bouvet Island lie entirely within the Eastern Hemisphere. The default geographical coordinates for Norway are 61°N 8°E, per the centroid of the country.
- The Netherlands has Caribbean overseas islands that lie entirely within the Western Hemisphere, while mainland Netherlands lies entirely within the Eastern Hemisphere. The default geographical coordinates for the Netherlands are 52°N 6°E, per the centroid of the country.
- France, the prime meridian passes through Puynormand (Gironde). About 1/3 of the country lies in the Western Hemisphere, including cities such as Nantes or Bordeaux, as well as the overseas territories of French Guiana, Guadeloupe and Martinique. The capital and most populated city Paris is entirely in the Eastern Hemisphere, along with the four next most populated cities (Lyon, Marseille, Toulouse, Nice), and other cities such as Cannes, Lille, Montpellier and Strasbourg. The offshore Mediterranean island of Corsica also lies within the Eastern Hemisphere, as do the overseas territories of the French Southern and Antarctic Lands, Mayotte and Réunion. The default geographical coordinates for France are 47°N 2°E, per the centroid of the country.
- Algeria, the prime meridian passes through Stidia. About 1/4 of the country, including Oran, Algeria's second-largest city, lies within the Western Hemisphere. The majority of the population lives in the Eastern Hemisphere. The capital and largest city Algiers is within the Eastern Hemisphere. After Algiers and Oran, the six next most populated cities (Constantine, Annaba, Blida, Batna, Djelfa and Sétif) are all located in the Eastern Hemisphere. The default geographical coordinates for Algeria are 28°N 2°E, per the centroid of the country.
- Togo, the prime meridian passes near Tami (Tône Prefecture in Savanes Region). Most of Togo, including the capital Lomé, lies within the Eastern Hemisphere. The default geographical coordinates for Togo are 8°N 1°E, per the centroid of the country.

==== Mostly in the Western Hemisphere (with some land east of prime meridian) ====
- United Kingdom, the prime meridian passes through Greenwich, London. Most of the country lies within the Western Hemisphere, including the majority of England, and all of Scotland, Northern Ireland and Wales. The majority of the population also lies within the Western Hemisphere, including most of London's population and other major population centers such as Liverpool and Manchester. Most of its Overseas Territories are in the Western Hemisphere, including the Falkland Islands and those in the Caribbean. The British Indian Ocean Territory is in the Eastern Hemisphere, and major mainland settlements entirely in the Eastern Hemisphere include Cambridge, Essex, Ipswich, Kent and Norwich. The default geographical coordinates for the United Kingdom are 55°N 3°W, per the centroid of the country.
- Spain, the prime meridian passes through Castellón de la Plana (Valencian Community). Most of Spain, including the capital Madrid, the Canary Islands and the southern half of its Mediterranean territorial waters, lies within the Western Hemisphere. Spanish, British (Gibraltar) Moroccan and Algerian Mediterranean waters are the only part of the Mediterranean Sea located in the Western Hemisphere. Major Spanish settlements in the Eastern Hemisphere include Barcelona and the northern Mediterranean island of Mallorca. The city of Valencia is just west of the prime meridian, although the greater Valencian Community region has areas in the Eastern Hemisphere. Aside from Barcelona, the rest of the Catalonia region is also east of the prime meridian. Catalonia has pushed for independence in the past, and if it eventually achieves this, it would become a country entirely within the Eastern Hemisphere. The default geographical coordinates for Spain are 40°N 4°W, per the centroid of the country.
- Mali, the prime meridian passes through the municipal area of Gao. Most of Mali, including the capital Bamako, lies within the Western Hemisphere. The default geographical coordinates for Mali are 17°N 4°W, per the centroid of the country.
- Burkina Faso, the prime meridian passes through Lalgaye. Most of the country, including the capital Ouagadougou, lies within the Western Hemisphere. Burkina Faso's largest city in the Eastern Hemisphere is Fada N'gourma. The default geographical coordinates for Burkina Faso are 12°N 1°W, per the centroid of the country.
- Ghana, the prime meridian passes through Tema. Most of Ghana, including the capital Accra, lies within the Western Hemisphere. Ghana's most populated settlements in the Eastern Hemisphere include Bimbilla, Ho, Tema New Town and Aflao. Lake Volta in Ghana is the largest artificial reservoir in the world, and it is situated in both the Eastern and Western Hemisphere. The default geographical coordinates for Ghana are 8°N 1°W, per the centroid of the country.

Below is a list of additional sovereign states which are in both the Western and Eastern hemispheres along the 180th meridian. France and the United Kingdom are not listed below due to their inclusion above, though both have Western Hemisphere territories east of the 180th meridian, including France's Clipperton Island, French Polynesia and Wallis and Futuna, and the United Kingdom's Pitcairn Islands. France also has the Eastern Hemisphere territory of New Caledonia, to the west of the 180th meridian. With the exception of the United States (due to Wake Island, Guam and the Northern Mariana Islands), the places below are located on just one side of the International Date Line, which curves around them.

==== Mostly in the Eastern Hemisphere (with some land east of 180th meridian) ====
- Russia, the 180th meridian passes through Chukotka Autonomous Okrug. Its portion lying east of the 180th meridian is the only part of the country lying in the Western Hemisphere. This far eastern part of Russia in the Western Hemisphere is also geologically part of the North American Plate, rather than the Eurasian Plate like with much of the country. The default geographical coordinates for Russia are 66°N 94°E, per the centroid of the country.
- Kiribati, the 180th meridian passes close to Arorae. The country has both the Equator and the 180th meridian (antimeridian) crossing through its territory. It is the only country located in four hemispheres. The capital South Tarawa lies in the Eastern Hemisphere and Northern Hemisphere. Over half of Kiribati's population lives on South Tarawa. The default geographical coordinates for Kiribati are 1°N 173°E, per the centroid of the country.
- Fiji, the 180th meridian passes close to its dependency Rotuma and passes through Taveuni. The capital Suva is in the Eastern Hemisphere. The default geographical coordinates for Fiji are 18°S 179°E, per the centroid of the country.
- New Zealand's two main islands lie within the Eastern Hemisphere; but Chatham Islands and Kermadec Islands, as well as the self-governing states of the Cook Islands and Niue and the dependent territory of Tokelau, lie east of the 180th meridian. The default geographical coordinates for New Zealand are 42°S 173°E, per the centroid of the country.

==== Mostly in the Western Hemisphere (with some land west of 180th meridian) ====
- United States, the 180th meridian passes through the Aleutian Islands (Alaska). Except for the portion of Aleutian Islands lying west of the 180th meridian, Guam, the Northern Mariana Islands, and Wake Island, most of the country lies in the Western Hemisphere, east of the 180th meridian. Guam and the Northern Mariana Islands are both overseas territories in the Micronesia region, while Wake Island is in the central Pacific and uninhabited by civilians. Wake Island is politically grouped with other U.S. central Pacific islands which are uninhabited by civilians (under the name U.S. Minor Outlying Islands). The Aleutian islands which are in the Eastern Hemisphere are the ones belonging to the Near Islands and Rat Islands groups, ranging from 51°N 179°E to 52°N 172°E. Semisopochnoi Island is the first island in the Aleutian chain which crosses over into the Eastern Hemisphere, and the remaining islands in the chain from that point on include Agattu, Alaid Island, Amchitka Island, Attu Island, Buldir Island, Davidof Island, Khvostof Island, Kiska, Little Kiska Island, Little Sitkin Island, Nizki Island, Segula Island and Shemya, among others The default geographical coordinates for the United States are 40°N 100°W, per the centroid of the country.

=== Sovereign states entirely in the Eastern Hemisphere ===
==== Africa ====
- Angola
- Benin
- Botswana
- Burundi
- Cameroon
- Central African Republic
- Chad
- Comoros
- Democratic Republic of Congo
- Djibouti
- Egypt
- Equatorial Guinea
- Eritrea
- Eswatini
- Ethiopia
- Gabon
- Kenya
- Lesotho
- Libya
- Madagascar
- Malawi
- Mauritius
- Mozambique
- Namibia
- Niger
- Nigeria
- Republic of the Congo
- Rwanda
- Sao Tome and Principe
- Seychelles
- Somalia
- South Africa
- South Sudan
- Sudan
- Tanzania
- Tunisia
- Uganda
- Zambia
- Zimbabwe

==== Asia ====
- Afghanistan
- Armenia
- Azerbaijan
- Bahrain
- Bangladesh
- Bhutan
- Cambodia
- China (including Hong Kong, Macau and Taiwan)
- Georgia
- India
- Indonesia
- Iran
- Iraq
- Israel
- Japan
- Jordan
- Kazakhstan
- Kuwait
- Kyrgyzstan
- Laos
- Lebanon
- Malaysia
- Maldives
- Mongolia
- Myanmar
- Nepal
- North Korea
- Oman
- Pakistan
- Palestine
- Philippines
- Qatar
- Saudi Arabia
- Singapore
- South Korea
- Sri Lanka
- Syria
- Tajikistan
- Thailand
- Timor-Leste
- Turkey
- Turkmenistan
- United Arab Emirates
- Uzbekistan
- Vietnam
- Yemen

==== Europe ====
- Albania
- Andorra
- Austria
- Belarus
- Belgium
- Bosnia and Herzegovina
- Bulgaria
- Croatia
- Cyprus
- Czechia
- Estonia
- Finland (including Åland)
- Germany
- Greece
- Hungary
- Italy
- Latvia
- Lithuania
- Luxembourg
- Malta
- Moldova
- Monaco
- Montenegro
- North Macedonia
- Poland
- Romania
- San Marino
- Serbia (including Kosovo)
- Slovakia
- Slovenia
- Sweden
- Switzerland
- Ukraine
- Vatican City

==== Oceania ====
- Australia (including Christmas Island, Cocos (Keeling) Islands, Heard Island and McDonald Islands and Norfolk Island)
- Federated States of Micronesia
- Marshall Islands
- Nauru
- Palau
- Papua New Guinea
- Solomon Islands
- Tuvalu
- Vanuatu

=== Former sovereign states entirely in the Eastern Hemisphere ===
==== Africa ====
- United Arab Republic (Egyptian part)

==== Asia ====
- North Vietnam
- South Vietnam
- North Yemen
- South Yemen
- United Arab Republic (Syrian part)

==== Europe ====
- Czechoslovakia
- East Germany
- Serbia and Montenegro
- West Germany
- Yugoslavia

== Eastern Hemisphere organizations ==
=== Alliance of Sahel States ===
- Burkina Faso
- Mali
- Niger

=== Asia Cooperation Dialogue (ACD) ===
- Afghanistan
- Bahrain
- Bhutan
- Brunei
- Cambodia
- China
- India
- Indonesia
- Iran
- Japan
- Kazakhstan
- Kuwait
- Kyrgyzstan
- Laos
- Malaysia
- Mongolia
- Myanmar
- Nepal
- Oman
- Pakistan
- Philippines
- Palestine
- Qatar
- Russia
- Saudi Arabia
- Singapore
- South Korea
- Sri Lanka
- Tajikistan
- Thailand
- Turkey
- United Arab Emirates
- Uzbekistan
- Vietnam

=== Association of Southeast Asian Nations (ASEAN) ===
- Brunei
- Cambodia
- Indonesia
- Laos
- Malaysia
- Myanmar
- Philippines
- Singapore
- Thailand
- Timor-Leste
- Vietnam

=== Benelux ===
- Belgium
- Luxembourg
- Netherlands

=== Bucharest Nine (B9) ===
- Bulgaria
- Czechia
- Estonia
- Hungary
- Latvia
- Lithuania
- Poland
- Romania
- Slovakia

=== Central European Defence Cooperation (CEDC) ===
- Austria
- Croatia
- Czechia
- Hungary
- Slovakia
- Slovenia

=== Central European Free Trade Agreement (CEFTA) ===
- Albania
- Bosnia and Herzegovina
- Bulgaria
- Croatia
- Czechia
- Hungary
- Kosovo
- Moldova
- Montenegro
- North Macedonia
- Poland
- Romania
- Serbia
- Slovakia
- Slovenia

=== Central European Initiative (CEI) ===
- Albania
- Belarus
- Bosnia and Herzegovina
- Bulgaria
- Croatia
- Czechia
- Hungary
- Italy
- Moldova
- Montenegro
- North Macedonia
- Poland
- Romania
- Serbia
- Slovakia
- Slovenia
- Ukraine

=== Common Market for Eastern and Southern Africa (COMESA) ===
- Burundi
- Comoros
- DR Congo
- Djibouti
- Egypt
- Eritrea
- Eswatini
- Ethiopia
- Kenya
- Libya
- Madagascar
- Malawi
- Mauritius
- Rwanda
- Seychelles
- Somalia
- Sudan
- Tunisia
- Uganda
- Zambia
- Zimbabwe

=== Collective Security Treaty Organisation (CSTO) ===
- Armenia
- Belarus
- Kazakhstan
- Kyrgyzstan
- Russia
- Tajikistan

=== Commonwealth of Independent States (CIS) ===
- Armenia
- Azerbaijan
- Belarus
- Kazakhstan
- Kyrgyzstan
- Russia
- Tajikistan
- Uzbekistan

=== Craiova Group ===
- Bulgaria
- Greece
- Romania
- Serbia

=== East African Community ===
- Burundi
- DR Congo
- Kenya
- Rwanda
- Somalia
- South Sudan
- Tanzania
- Uganda

=== Economic Cooperation Organization (ECO) ===
- Afghanistan
- Azerbaijan
- Iran
- Kazakhstan
- Kyrgyzstan
- Pakistan
- Tajikistan
- Turkey
- Turkmenistan
- Uzbekistan

=== Eurasian Economic Union (EEU) ===
- Armenia
- Belarus
- Kazakhstan
- Kyrgyzstan
- Russia

=== GUAM Organization for Democracy and Economic Development ===
- Azerbaijan
- Georgia
- Moldova
- Ukraine

=== Gulf Cooperation Council (GCC) ===
- Bahrain
- Kuwait
- Oman
- Qatar
- Saudi Arabia
- United Arab Emirates

=== Indian Ocean Rim Association (IORA) ===
- Australia
- Bangladesh
- Comoros
- France
- India
- Indonesia
- Iran
- Kenya
- Madagascar
- Malaysia
- Maldives
- Mauritius
- Mozambique
- Oman
- Seychelles
- Singapore
- Somalia
- South Africa
- Sri Lanka
- Tanzania
- Thailand
- United Arab Emirates
- Yemen

=== Intergovernmental Authority on Development (IGAD) ===
- Djibouti
- Ethiopia
- Kenya
- Somalia
- South Sudan
- Sudan
- Uganda

=== Lublin Triangle ===
- Lithuania
- Poland
- Ukraine

=== Melanesian Spearhead Group (MSG) ===
- Fiji
- New Caledonia
- Papua New Guinea
- Solomon Islands
- Vanuatu

=== Micronesian Islands Forum (MIF) ===
- Federated States of Micronesia
- Guam
- Marshall Islands
- Nauru
- Northern Mariana Islands
- Palau

=== Organization of the Black Sea Economic Cooperation (BSEC) ===
- Albania
- Armenia
- Azerbaijan
- Bulgaria
- Georgia
- Greece
- Moldova
- North Macedonia
- Romania
- Russia
- Serbia
- Turkey
- Ukraine

=== Open Balkan ===
- Albania
- North Macedonia
- Serbia

=== Organization of Turkic States (OTS) ===
- Azerbaijan
- Kazakhstan
- Kyrgyzstan
- Turkey
- Uzbekistan

=== Regional Comprehensive Economic Partnership (RCEP) ===
- Australia
- Brunei
- Cambodia
- China
- Indonesia
- Japan
- Laos
- Malaysia
- Myanmar
- New Zealand
- Philippines
- Singapore
- South Korea
- Thailand
- Timor-Leste
- Vietnam

=== Salzburg Forum (SF) ===
- Austria
- Bulgaria
- Croatia
- Czechia
- Hungary
- Poland
- Romania
- Slovakia
- Slovenia

=== South Asian Association for Regional Cooperation (SAARC) ===
- Afghanistan
- Bangladesh
- Bhutan
- India
- Maldives
- Nepal
- Pakistan
- Sri Lanka

=== South-East European Cooperation Process (SEECP) ===
- Albania
- Bosnia and Herzegovina
- Bulgaria
- Croatia
- Greece
- Kosovo
- Moldova
- Montenegro
- North Macedonia
- Romania
- Serbia
- Slovenia
- Turkey

=== Southern African Customs Union (SACU) ===
- Botswana
- Eswatini
- Lesotho
- Namibia
- South Africa

=== Southern African Development Community (SADC) ===
- Angola
- Botswana
- Comoros
- DR Congo
- Eswatini
- Lesotho
- Madagascar
- Malawi
- Mauritius
- Mozambique
- Namibia
- Seychelles
- South Africa
- Tanzania
- Zambia
- Zimbabwe

=== Visegrád Group ===
- Czechia
- Hungary
- Poland
- Slovakia

=== Weimar Triangle ===
- France
- Germany
- Poland

== Eastern Hemisphere statistics ==
=== GDP of countries in the Eastern Hemisphere ===
GDP of countries (Nominal, 2025)
Rank	Country	GDP in 2025 (Nominal, USD)
1	United States^{[note1]}	$30.86 trillion
2	China	$19.63 trillion
3	Germany	$5.12 trillion
4	Japan	$4.45 trillion
5	United Kingdom^{[note1]}	$4.01 trillion
6	India	$3.91 trillion
7	France	$3.38 trillion
8	Russia	$2.57 trillion
9	Italy	$2.55 trillion
10	Spain^{[note1]}	$1.91 trillion
11	South Korea	$1.88 trillion
12	Australia	$1.84 trillion
13	Turkey	$1.60 trillion
14	Indonesia	$1.45 trillion
15	Netherlands	$1.32 trillion
16	Saudi Arabia	$1.27 trillion
17	Switzerland	$1.06 trillion
18	Poland	$1.04 trillion
19	Belgium	$725.06 billion
20	Israel	$616.56 billion
21	Sweden	$676.54 billion
22	United Arab Emirates	$614.40 billion
23	Singapore	$603.87 billion
24	Austria	$580.10 billion
25	Thailand	$577.01 billion
26	Norway	$530.15 billion
27	Vietnam	$494.05 billion
28	Philippines	$487.09 billion
29	Malaysia	$472.73 billion
30	Denmark	$470.95 billion
31	Bangladesh	$457.90 billion
32	Romania	$429.29 billion
33	South Africa	$427.14 billion
34	Pakistan	$408.16 billion
35	Czechia	$391.79 billion
36	Iran	$371.12 billion
37	Egypt	$364.64 billion
38	Finland	$318.23 billion
39	Kazakhstan	$306 billion
40	Nigeria	$290.49 billion
41	Algeria	$284.46 billion
42	Greece	$280.48 billion
43	Iraq	$264.17 billion
44	New Zealand	$259.51 billion
45	Hungary	$247.13 billion
46	Qatar	$215.56 billion
47	Ukraine	$214.23 billion
48	Kuwait	$157.20 billion
49	Slovakia	$154.44 billion
50	Uzbekistan	$147.07 billion
51	Angola	$140.68 billion
52	Kenya	$135.92 billion
53	Bulgaria	$131.02 billion
54	Ethiopia	$126.35 billion
55	Ghana^{[note1]}	$114.71 billion
56	Oman	$109.43 billion
57	Sri Lanka	$108.86 billion
58	Croatia	$105.01 billion
59	Luxembourg	$101.10 billion
60	Serbia	$99.95 billion
61	Belarus	$96.05 billion
62	Lithuania	$95.15 billion
63	Democratic Republic of the Congo	$92.90 billion
64	Tanzania	$89.61 billion
65	Myanmar	$82.31 billion
66	Slovenia	$80.38 billion
67	Turkmenistan	$77.40 billion
68	Azerbaijan	$75.94 billion
69	Uganda	$66.45 billion
70	Jordan	$61.70 billion
71	Cameroon	$59.16 billion
72	Zimbabwe	$58.29 billion
73	Tunisia	$57.26 billion
74	Cambodia	$50.66 billion
75	Bahrain	$48.97 billion
76	Latvia	$48.59 billion
77	Estonia	$47.29 billion
78	Nepal	$45.49 billion
79	Libya	$44.74 billion
80	Cyprus	$41.20 billion
81	Georgia	$38.14 billion
82	Sudan	$36.50 billion
83	Lebanon	$34.49 billion
84	Bosnia and Herzegovina	$33.59 billion
85	Papua New Guinea	$33.10 billion
86	Mali^{[note1]}	$31.23 billion
87	Albania	$30.11 billion
88	Armenia	$29.31 billion
89	Zambia	$28.71 billion
90	Malta	$27.85 billion
91	Burkina Faso^{[note1]}	$27.68 billion
92	Mongolia	$25.37 billion
93	Benin	$24.61 billion
94	Mozambique	$23.60 billion
95	Kyrgyzstan	$22.63 billion
96	Chad	$21.96 billion
97	Gabon	$21.89 billion
98	Niger	$21.27 billion
99	Moldova	$20.34 billion
100	Syria	$19.99 billion
101	Botswana	$19.89 billion
102	Afghanistan	$19.71 billion
103	Madagascar	$19.47 billion
104	North Macedonia	$19.14 billion
105	Tajikistan	$17.54 billion
106	Palestine	$17.17 billion
107	Laos	$16.91 billion
108	North Korea	$16.45 billion
109	Rwanda	$16.37 billion
110	Mauritius	$16.07 billion
111	Republic of the Congo	$15.43 billion
112	Malawi	$15.10 billion
113	Namibia	$15.08 billion
114	Brunei	$15 billion
115	Somalia	$13.23 billion
116	Equatorial Guinea	$12.85 billion
117	Togo	$11.91 billion
118	Monaco	$11.13 billion
119	Montenegro	$9.23 billion
120	Liechtenstein	$9.03 billion
121	Yemen	$7.86 billion
122	Maldives	$7.76 billion
123	Burundi	$6.78 billion
124	Fiji	$6.23 billion
125	South Sudan	$5.54 billion
126	Eswatini	$5.21 billion
127	Central African Republic	$4.64 billion
128	Andorra	$4.49 billion
129	Djibouti	$4.49 billion
130	Bhutan	$3.51 billion
131	Lesotho	$2.77 billion
132	Seychelles	$2.33 billion
133	Eritrea	$2.28 billion
134	San Marino	$2.25 billion
135	Timor-Leste	$2.06 billion
136	Solomon Islands	$1.73 billion
137	Comoros	$1.61 billion
138	Vanuatu	$1.31 billion
139	Sao Tome and Principe	$981 million
140	Federated States of Micronesia	$507 million
141	Palau	$352 million
142	Kiribati	$349 million
143	Marshall Islands	$303 million
144	Nauru	$176 million
145	Tuvalu	$70 million

=== Life expectancy of countries in the Eastern Hemisphere ===
Life expectancy by country (2025)
Rank	Country	Combined life expectancy	Life expectancy, males	Life expectancy, females
1	Monaco	86.6 years	84.6 years	88.6 years
2	San Marino	85.8 years	84.3 years	87.2 years
3	Kuwait	84.6 years	83.8 years	85.4 years
4	Switzerland	84.5 years	82.7 years	86.2 years
5	Andorra	84.3 years	82.3 years	86.2 years
6	Liechtenstein	84.3 years	82.2 years	86.3 years
7	Japan	84.1 years	81.1 years	87.1 years
8	Sweden	84.1 years	82.6 years	85.6 years
9	Italy	84.0 years	82.0 years	86.0 years
10	Spain^{[note1]}	84.0 years	81.4 years	86.5 years
11	South Korea	83.7 years	80.8 years	86.6 years
12	Singapore	83.4 years	81.2 years	85.6 years
13	Israel	83.3 years	81.1 years	85.4 years
14	Luxembourg	83.3 years	81.0 years	85.5 years
15	United Arab Emirates	83.3 years	82.2 years	84.3 years
16	Norway	83.2 years	81.6 years	84.8 years
17	Australia	83.1 years	81.1 years	85.1 years
18	France	83.1 years	80.2 years	85.9 years
19	Malta	83.0 years	81.2 years	84.8 years
20	Qatar	82.7 years	81.8 years	83.5 years
21	Belgium	82.4 years	80.3 years	84.4 years
22	Finland	82.4 years	79.8 years	85.0 years
23	Slovenia	82.4 years	79.7 years	85.0 years
24	Denmark	82.3 years	80.4 years	84.2 years
25	Austria	82.1 years	79.8 years	84.3 years
26	New Zealand	82.1 years	80.4 years	83.7 years
27	Netherlands	82.0 years	80.6 years	83.4 years
28	Greece	81.9 years	79.4 years	84.4 years
29	Cyprus	81.8 years	79.8 years	83.8 years
30	Bahrain	81.5 years	80.9 years	82.1 years
31	Maldives	81.5 years	79.9 years	83.0 years
32	United Kingdom^{[note1]}	81.4 years	79.5 years	83.3 years
33	Germany	80.9 years	78.5 years	83.2 years
34	Oman	80.4 years	78.7 years	82.0 years
35	Czechia	80.1 years	77.1 years	83.0 years
36	Albania	79.8 years	77.9 years	81.6 years
37	Estonia	79.4 years	75.1 years	83.7 years
38	Saudi Arabia	79.3 years	77.3 years	81.3 years
39	Croatia	79.0 years	76.1 years	81.9 years
40	United States^{[note1]}	79.0 years	76.5 years	81.4 years
41	Poland	78.5 years	74.8 years	82.2 years
42	Slovakia	78.5 years	75.2 years	81.7 years
43	Armenia	78.4 years	75.1 years	81.7 years
44	China	78.1 years	75.2 years	81.0 years
45	Jordan	78.1 years	75.9 years	80.3 years
46	Montenegro	78.0 years	75.5 years	80.4 years
47	Iran	77.9 years	76.0 years	79.8 years
48	Lebanon	77.9 years	75.9 years	79.9 years
49	Bosnia and Herzegovina	77.9 years	74.6 years	81.1 years
50	Sri Lanka	77.6 years	74.4 years	80.7 years
51	Turkey	77.5 years	74.6 years	80.3 years
52	Lithuania	77.3 years	73.0 years	81.6 years
53	Malaysia	77.0 years	74.4 years	79.5 years
54	Hungary	76.8 years	73.7 years	79.9 years
55	North Macedonia	76.7 years	74.5 years	78.9 years
56	Tunisia	76.7 years	74.1 years	79.3 years
57	Thailand	76.7 years	72.3 years	81.0 years
58	Latvia	76.6 years	71.6 years	81.5 years
59	Romania	76.6 years	72.8 years	80.3 years
60	Algeria	76.5 years	75.1 years	77.9 years
61	Seychelles	76.4 years	72.1 years	80.7 years
62	Serbia	76.1 years	73.7 years	78.4 years
63	Bulgaria	75.9 years	72.2 years	79.5 years
64	Brunei	75.6 years	73.5 years	77.7 years
65	Bangladesh	75.0 years	73.3 years	76.7 years
66	Vietnam	74.8 years	70.1 years	79.4 years
67	Ukraine	74.6 years	69.8 years	79.4 years
68	Azerbaijan	74.5 years	71.7 years	77.3 years
69	Belarus	74.5 years	69.7 years	79.2 years
70	Georgia	74.5 years	69.7 years	79.2 years
71	Kazakhstan	74.4 years	70.3 years	78.5 years
72	Mauritius	73.9 years	70.4 years	77.4 years
73	North Korea	73.8 years	71.6 years	75.9 years
74	Russia	73.6 years	68.3 years	78.9 years
75	Bhutan	73.5 years	71.6 years	75.3 years
76	Syria	72.6 years	70.2 years	74.9 years
77	Uzbekistan	72.6 years	69.6 years	75.5 years
78	Kyrgyzstan	72.5 years	68.4 years	76.6 years
79	Mongolia	72.5 years	67.9 years	77.1 years
80	Iraq	72.4 years	70.5 years	74.2 years
81	India	72.3 years	70.7 years	73.9 years
82	Tajikistan	71.9 years	69.7 years	74.1 years
83	Vanuatu	71.9 years	69.6 years	74.1 years
84	Egypt	71.9 years	69.7 years	74.0 years
85	Indonesia	71.3 years	69.2 years	73.4 years
86	Moldova	71.2 years	66.7 years	75.7 years
87	Libya	71.2 years	69.6 years	72.7 years
88	Solomon Islands	70.8 years	69.4 years	72.2 years
89	Cambodia	70.8 years	68.1 years	73.4 years
90	Nepal	70.6 years	69.1 years	72.1 years
91	Sao Tome and Principe	70.2 years	66.4 years	73.9 years
92	Philippines	70.0 years	67.0 years	73.0 years
93	Turkmenistan	70.0 years	67.0 years	73.0 years
94	Palestine	69.8 years	65.2 years	74.3 years
95	Palau	69.6 years	67.3 years	71.9 years
96	Yemen	69.5 years	67.4 years	71.5 years
97	Botswana	69.4 years	66.8 years	71.9 years
98	Laos	69.3 years	67.0 years	71.5 years
99	Eritrea	68.9 years	66.8 years	70.9 years
100	Gabon	68.7 years	66.1 years	71.2 years
101	Uganda	68.5 years	65.5 years	71.4 years
102	Timor-Leste	68.0 years	66.3 years	69.7 years
103	Pakistan	67.9 years	65.5 years	70.3 years
104	Rwanda	67.9 years	65.7 years	70.1 years
105	Ethiopia	67.7 years	64.4 years	71.0 years
106	Malawi	67.6 years	64.3 years	70.8 years
107	Fiji	67.5 years	65.5 years	69.5 years
108	Namibia	67.5 years	63.5 years	71.5 years
109	Federated States of Micronesia	67.5 years	63.6 years	71.3 years
110	Tuvalu	67.4 years	63.9 years	70.9 years
111	Marshall Islands	67.3 years	65.0 years	69.5 years
112	Myanmar	67.2 years	64.0 years	70.4 years
113	Tanzania	67.2 years	64.4 years	70.0 years
114	Comoros	67.1 years	65.0 years	69.2 years
115	Sudan	66.6 years	63.4 years	69.8 years
116	Kiribati	66.5 years	64.7 years	68.3 years
117	Papua New Guinea	66.5 years	63.8 years	69.2 years
118	Zambia	66.5 years	64.1 years	68.9 years
119	South Africa	66.3 years	62.8 years	69.8 years
120	Afghanistan	66.3 years	64.7 years	67.8 years
121	Djibouti	66.2 years	63.7 years	68.7 years
122	Republic of the Congo	66.0 years	64.3 years	67.7 years
123	Ghana^{[note1]}	65.8 years	63.3 years	68.2 years
124	Angola	64.8 years	62.3 years	67.3 years
125	Eswatini	64.2 years	61.3 years	67.1 years
126	Equatorial Guinea	64.1 years	62.2 years	65.9 years
127	Cameroon	64.0 years	61.8 years	66.2 years
128	Burundi	63.9 years	61.8 years	65.9 years
129	Kenya	63.9 years	61.6 years	66.1 years
130	Madagascar	63.9 years	62.1 years	65.6 years
131	Mozambique	63.6 years	60.5 years	66.7 years
132	Togo	63.0 years	62.7 years	63.2 years
133	Zimbabwe	62.9 years	60.5 years	65.3 years
134	Nauru	62.3 years	60.4 years	64.2 years
135	Democratic Republic of the Congo	62.1 years	60.0 years	64.2 years
136	Niger	61.5 years	60.5 years	62.4 years
137	Burkina Faso^{[note1]}	61.3 years	59.1 years	63.4 years
138	Benin	61.0 years	59.5 years	62.4 years
139	Mali^{[note1]}	60.8 years	59.3 years	62.2 years
140	Somalia	59.1 years	56.5 years	61.6 years
141	South Sudan	57.8 years	54.8 years	60.7 years
142	Lesotho	57.7 years	55.0 years	60.4 years
143	Central African Republic	57.6 years	55.5 years	59.6 years
144	Chad	55.3 years	53.4 years	57.2 years
145	Nigeria	54.6 years	54.3 years	54.9 years

=== Gender ratio difference of countries in the Eastern Hemisphere ===
Difference in size between female population and male population (2025)
Rank	Country / Territory	Female population (% of total, 2025)	Male population (% of total, 2025)	Males per 100 females
1	Qatar	28.91%	71.09%	245.9
2	United Arab Emirates	36.23%	63.77%	176.0
3	Oman	37.59%	62.41%	166.0
4	Bahrain	37.96%	62.04%	163.4
5	Maldives	38.29%	61.71%	161.2
6	Kuwait	38.93%	61.07%	156.9
7	Saudi Arabia	39.57%	60.43%	152.7
8	Seychelles	44.94%	55.06%	122.5
9	Palau	46.18%	53.82%	116.5
10	Bhutan	46.59%	53.41%	114.6
11	Brunei	46.94%	53.06%	113.0
12	Equatorial Guinea	47.31%	52.69%	111.4
13	Malaysia	47.69%	52.31%	109.7
14	Malta	48.07%	51.93%	108.0
15	Singapore	48.35%	51.65%	106.8
16	India	48.44%	51.56%	106.4
17	Jordan	48.49%	51.51%	106.2
18	Papua New Guinea	48.62%	51.38%	105.7
19	Tuvalu	48.81%	51.19%	104.9
20	Marshall Islands	48.84%	51.16%	104.8
21	Solomon Islands	48.87%	51.13%	104.6
22	Andorra	48.90%	51.10%	104.5
23	Algeria	49.01%	50.99%	104.0
24	China	49.09%	50.91%	103.7
25	Nauru	49.12%	50.88%	103.6
26	Libya	49.16%	50.84%	103.4
27	Iran	49.20%	50.80%	103.3
28	Niger	49.23%	50.77%	103.1
29	Gabon	49.28%	50.72%	102.9
30	Pakistan	49.33%	50.67%	102.7
31	Yemen	49.33%	50.67%	102.7
32	Nigeria	49.40%	50.60%	102.4
33	Afghanistan	49.50%	50.50%	102.0
34	Egypt	49.51%	50.49%	102.0
35	Vanuatu	49.53%	50.47%	101.9
36	Uzbekistan	49.55%	50.45%	101.8
37	Mali^{[note1]}	49.55%	50.45%	101.8
38	Timor-Leste	49.58%	50.42%	101.7
39	Norway	49.59%	50.41%	101.7
40	Sweden	49.62%	50.38%	101.5
41	Cyprus	49.63%	50.37%	101.5
42	Luxembourg	49.65%	50.35%	101.4
43	Slovenia	49.70%	50.30%	101.2
44	Comoros	49.72%	50.28%	101.1
45	United States^{[note1]}	49.75%	50.25%	101.0
46	Laos	49.76%	50.24%	101.0
47	Indonesia	49.77%	50.23%	100.9
48	Iraq	49.78%	50.22%	100.9
49	Benin	49.84%	50.16%	100.6
50	Chad	49.84%	50.16%	100.6
51	Madagascar	49.84%	50.16%	100.6
52	Ethiopia	49.90%	50.10%	100.4
53	Somalia	49.91%	50.09%	100.4
54	Syria	49.94%	50.06%	100.2
55	Republic of the Congo	50.01%	49.99%	100.0
56	Ghana^{[note1]}	50.06%	49.94%	99.8
57	South Korea	50.11%	49.89%	99.6
58	Turkey	50.11%	49.89%	99.6
59	Philippines	50.12%	49.88%	99.5
60	Mauritius	50.14%	49.86%	99.4
61	Cameroon	50.17%	49.83%	99.3
62	Mongolia	50.17%	49.83%	99.3
63	Botswana	50.18%	49.82%	99.3
64	Burkina Faso^{[note1]}	50.18%	49.82%	99.3
65	Israel	50.19%	49.81%	99.2
66	Myanmar	50.24%	49.76%	99.0
67	Denmark	50.29%	49.71%	98.8
68	Kenya	50.29%	49.71%	98.8
69	Liechtenstein	50.30%	49.70%	98.8
70	Netherlands	50.31%	49.69%	98.8
71	New Zealand	50.30%	49.70%	98.8
72	Switzerland	50.31%	49.69%	98.8
73	Burundi	50.32%	49.68%	98.7
74	Sao Tome and Principe	50.32%	49.68%	98.7
75	Federated States of Micronesia	50.34%	49.66%	98.6
76	Fiji	50.37%	49.63%	98.5
77	Australia	50.38%	49.62%	98.5
78	Democratic Republic of the Congo	50.38%	49.62%	98.5
79	Palestine	50.38%	49.62%	98.5
80	Uganda	50.38%	49.62%	98.5
81	Tanzania	50.42%	49.58%	98.3
82	Djibouti	50.44%	49.56%	98.3
83	Sudan	50.44%	49.56%	98.3
84	North Korea	50.49%	49.51%	98.1
85	Zambia	50.50%	49.50%	98.0
86	Angola	50.51%	49.49%	98.0
87	Finland	50.55%	49.45%	97.8
88	Albania	50.58%	49.42%	97.7
89	Kyrgyzstan	50.58%	49.42%	97.7
90	Tunisia	50.59%	49.41%	97.7
91	Eritrea	50.62%	49.38%	97.6
92	Germany	50.62%	49.38%	97.6
93	Belgium	50.67%	49.33%	97.4
94	Czechia	50.68%	49.32%	97.3
95	Austria	50.75%	49.25%	97.0
96	United Kingdom^{[note1]}	50.75%	49.25%	97.0
97	South Sudan	50.82%	49.18%	96.8
98	San Marino	50.83%	49.17%	96.7
99	Tajikistan	50.83%	49.17%	96.7
100	Bangladesh	50.84%	49.16%	96.7
101	Eswatini	50.88%	49.12%	96.5
102	Turkmenistan	50.89%	49.11%	96.5
103	Spain^{[note1]}	50.91%	49.09%	96.4
104	Azerbaijan	50.96%	49.04%	96.2
105	Cambodia	50.98%	49.02%	96.2
106	Vietnam	51.02%	48.98%	96.0
107	Togo	51.06%	48.94%	95.8
108	Italy	51.09%	48.91%	95.7
109	Monaco	51.09%	48.91%	95.7
110	Namibia	51.17%	48.83%	95.4
111	Rwanda	51.18%	48.82%	95.4
112	Malawi	51.19%	48.81%	95.4
113	Slovakia	51.19%	48.81%	95.4
114	Japan	51.24%	48.76%	95.2
115	Lesotho	51.25%	48.75%	95.1
116	Kazakhstan	51.27%	48.73%	95.0
117	North Macedonia	51.34%	48.66%	94.8
118	South Africa	51.34%	48.66%	94.8
119	Lebanon	51.35%	48.65%	94.7
120	Thailand	51.36%	48.64%	94.7
121	Kiribati	51.42%	48.58%	94.5
122	Mozambique	51.45%	48.55%	94.4
123	France	51.52%	48.48%	94.1
124	Greece	51.55%	48.45%	94.0
125	Poland	51.57%	48.43%	93.9
126	Romania	51.57%	48.43%	93.9
127	Bulgaria	51.61%	48.39%	93.8
128	Sri Lanka	51.63%	48.37%	93.7
129	Croatia	51.74%	48.26%	93.3
130	Montenegro	51.85%	48.15%	92.9
131	Central African Republic	51.93%	48.07%	92.6
132	Hungary	51.95%	48.05%	92.5
133	Nepal	52.29%	47.71%	91.2
134	Zimbabwe	52.29%	47.71%	91.2
135	Bosnia and Herzegovina	52.38%	47.62%	90.9
136	Estonia	52.40%	47.60%	90.8
137	Serbia	52.60%	47.40%	90.1
138	Lithuania	52.77%	47.23%	89.5
139	Georgia	53.37%	46.63%	87.4
140	Belarus	53.41%	46.59%	87.2
141	Ukraine	53.47%	46.53%	87.0
142	Armenia	53.59%	46.41%	86.6
143	Latvia	53.59%	46.41%	86.6
144	Russia	53.63%	46.37%	86.5
145	Moldova	54.01%	45.99%	85.2

=== Alcohol consumption of countries in the Eastern Hemisphere ===
Rank	Country	Alcohol consumption per person (litres of pure alcohol, 2020)
1	Romania	16.8 litres per person
2	Georgia	14.4 litres per person
3	Latvia	12.9 litres per person
4	Lithuania	12.1 litres per person
5	Czechia	12 litres per person
6	Germany	11.8 litres per person
7	Poland	11.7 litres per person
8	Belarus	11.6 litres per person
9	Bulgaria	11.6 litres per person
10	Austria	11.5 litres per person
11	Burkina Faso^{[note1]}	11.3 litres per person
12	Uganda	11.3 litres per person
13	Moldova	11.1 litres per person
14	Tanzania	10.9 litres per person
15	Laos	10.8 litres per person
16	Luxembourg	10.8 litres per person
17	Estonia	10.7 litres per person
18	Slovakia	10.7 litres per person
19	United Kingdom^{[note1]}	10.7 litres per person
20	Russia	10.5 litres per person
21	Slovenia	10.4 litres per person
22	Australia	10.3 litres per person
23	France	10.3 litres per person
24	Montenegro	10.3 litres per person
25	Seychelles	10.2 litres per person
26	Switzerland	10.1 litres per person
27	New Zealand	10.0 litres per person
28	Hungary	9.9 litres per person
29	United States^{[note1]}	9.9 litres per person
30	Andorra	9.7 litres per person
31	Cameroon	9.6 litres per person
32	Sweden	9.6 litres per person
33	Denmark	9.5 litres per person
34	Belgium	9.4 litres per person
35	Spain^{[note1]}	9.2 litres per person
36	Ukraine	9.2 litres per person
37	Finland	9.1 litres per person
38	Benin	8.8 litres per person
39	Netherlands	8.7 litres per person
40	Gabon	8.1 litres per person
41	Thailand	8 litres per person
42	Vietnam	8 litres per person
43	Serbia	7.9 litres per person
44	South Korea	7.8 litres per person
45	Croatia	7.7 litres per person
46	Mongolia	7.7 litres per person
47	Norway	7.4 litres per person
48	Botswana	7.3 litres per person
49	South Africa	7.1 litres per person
50	Malta	7.1 litres per person
51	Italy	7.0 litres per person
52	Mauritius	6.9 litres per person
53	Eswatini	6.8 litres per person
54	Cambodia	6.7 litres per person
55	Equatorial Guinea	6.6 litres per person
56	Cyprus	6.4 litres per person
57	Japan	6.4 litres per person
58	Republic of the Congo	6.0 litres per person
59	Bosnia and Herzegovina	5.9 litres per person
60	Greece	5.8 litres per person
61	Philippines	5.7 litres per person
62	Mali^{[note1]}	5.3 litres per person
63	Namibia	5.0 litres per person
64	Sao Tome and Principe	4.8 litres per person
65	China	4.6 litres per person
66	Albania	4.5 litres per person
67	Kazakhstan	4.5 litres per person
68	North Macedonia	4.4 litres per person
69	Armenia	4.3 litres per person
70	Ghana^{[note1]}	4.3 litres per person
71	Lesotho	4.3 litres per person
72	Burundi	4.2 litres per person
73	Angola	4.1 litres per person
74	India	4.1 litres per person
75	North Korea	3.9 litres per person
76	Nigeria	3.8 litres per person
77	Fiji	3.6 litres per person
78	Kyrgyzstan	3.6 litres per person
79	Malawi	3.6 litres per person
80	Zambia	3.6 litres per person
81	Ethiopia	3.1 litres per person
82	Rwanda	2.9 litres per person
83	Chad	2.9 litres per person
84	Sri Lanka	2.9 litres per person
85	Israel	2.8 litres per person
86	Nauru	2.8 litres per person
87	Zimbabwe	2.7 litres per person
88	Turkmenistan	2.6 litres per person
89	Azerbaijan	2.5 litres per person
90	Kenya	2.5 litres per person
91	United Arab Emirates	2.1 litres per person
92	Uzbekistan	2.1 litres per person
93	Federated States of Micronesia	2.0 litres per person
94	Vanuatu	2.0 litres per person
95	Democratic Republic of the Congo	1.9 litres per person
96	Mozambique	1.9 litres per person
97	Myanmar	1.9 litres per person
98	Central African Republic	1.8 litres per person
99	Singapore	1.8 litres per person
100	Tunisia	1.7 litres per person
101	Turkey	1.7 litres per person
102	Maldives	1.5 litres per person
103	Solomon Islands	1.4 litres per person
104	Togo	1.4 litres per person
105	Bahrain	1.3 litres per person
106	Lebanon	1.3 litres per person
107	Tuvalu	1.3 litres per person
108	Eritrea	1.1 litres per person
109	Nepal	1.1 litres per person
110	Papua New Guinea	1.1 litres per person
111	Qatar	1.1 litres per person
112	Madagascar	1.0 litres per person
113	Kiribati	0.7 litres per person
114	Malaysia	0.7 litres per person
115	Tajikistan	0.7 litres per person
116	Algeria	0.5 litres per person
117	Brunei	0.5 litres per person
118	Iran	0.5 litres per person
119	Oman	0.5 litres per person
120	Djibouti	0.4 litres per person
121	Bhutan	0.2 litres per person
122	Comoros	0.2 litres per person
123	Iraq	0.2 litres per person
124	Jordan	0.2 litres per person
125	Timor-Leste	0.2 litres per person
126	Afghanistan	0.1 litres per person
127	Bangladesh	0.1 litres per person
128	Egypt	0.1 litres per person
129	Indonesia	0.1 litres per person
130	Libya	0.1 litres per person
131	Niger	0.1 litres per person
132	Pakistan	0.1 litres per person
133	Sudan	0.1 litres per person
134	Syria	0.1 litres per person
135	Yemen	0.1 litres per person
136	Kuwait	0.0 litres per person
137	Saudi Arabia	0.0 litres per person
138	Somalia	0.0 litres per person
139	Liechtenstein	No data
140	Marshall Islands	No data
141	Monaco	No data
142	Palau	No data
143	Palestine	No data
144	San Marino	No data
145	South Sudan	No data

== See also ==
- Land and water hemispheres
- Eastern world
- Western Hemisphere

== Notes ==
1. Mostly in the Western Hemisphere.
