= Hammerhead Island =

Hammerhead Island is an 800 ft (240 m) long island in the Aleutian Islands of the U.S. state of Alaska. It is located at 52°43′29″N 174°02′39″E in the Semichi Islands group of the Near Islands of the Aleutians. It has been described in the Aleutian Coast Pilot as "the most prominent" of two islands in Shemya Pass, which separates Nizki and Shemya islands.
