= Lotus Island =

Island in the Aleutian Islands chain, Alaska, U.S.

Lotus Island is a 0.2-mile-long (320 m) island in the Aleutian Islands chain of the U.S. state of Alaska. It lies within the Aleutians West Census Area. Located at 52°43′55″N 174°03′55″E in the Semichi Islands group of the Near Islands, it is the least prominent of the two islands in the Shemya Pass, which separates Nizki and Shemya islands. "Lotus" is also the name of an island in the Odyssey.

Guitarist Buckethead recorded a song named after this island. The American rock band Black Light Burns titled their 2013 concept album after the island. In the film The Holy Mountain (1973), the island is chosen by the great alchemist to reveal their final journey.
