= Semichi Islands =

Island group in Alaska, United States

Native name: Samiyan
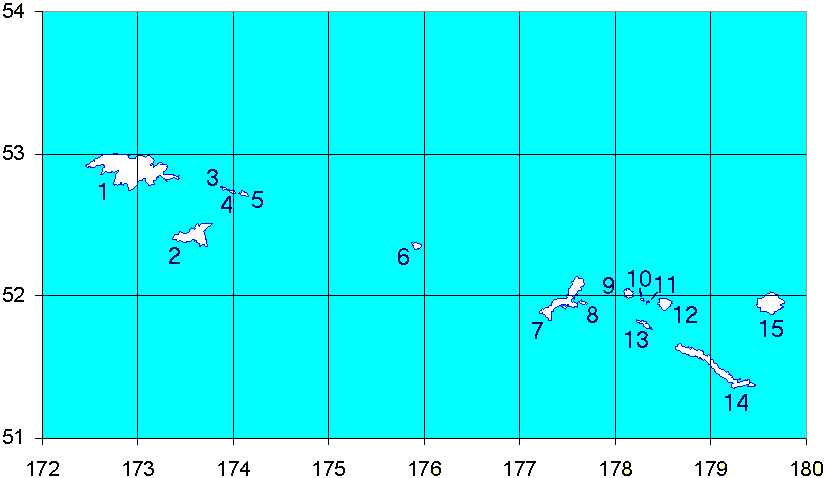
- 3 - Alaid; 4 - Nizki; 5 - Shemya.

- Location in Alaska

Geography
- Location: Pacific Ocean, Bering Sea
- Archipelago: Aleutian Islands

Administration
- United States
- State: Alaska
- Census area: Aleutians West

The Semichi Islands (Samiyan in Aleut; Russian: Семичи) are a cluster of small islands in the Near Islands group of the Aleutian Islands, Alaska. They are located southeast of Attu Island and northeast of Agattu Island, near 52°44′06″N 173°59′28″E. Named islands in the group include Alaid Island, Hammerhead Island, Lotus Island, Nizki Island, and Shemya.

The Semichi Islands are an important nesting area for red-faced cormorants and glaucous-winged gulls. They also provides important habitat for waterfowl: The Aleutian subspecies of cackling goose nests on the islands in significant numbers, and common eider and emperor goose winter in the area. Black oystercatchers are also found in significant numbers.
