= Alaid Island =

Alaid Island may refer to

- Atlasov Island in the Kuril Islands chain
- Alaid Island (Alaska) in the Semichi Islands chain.
