= Nizki Island =

Island in Aleutians West Census Area, Alaska, United States

Native name: Avayax̂
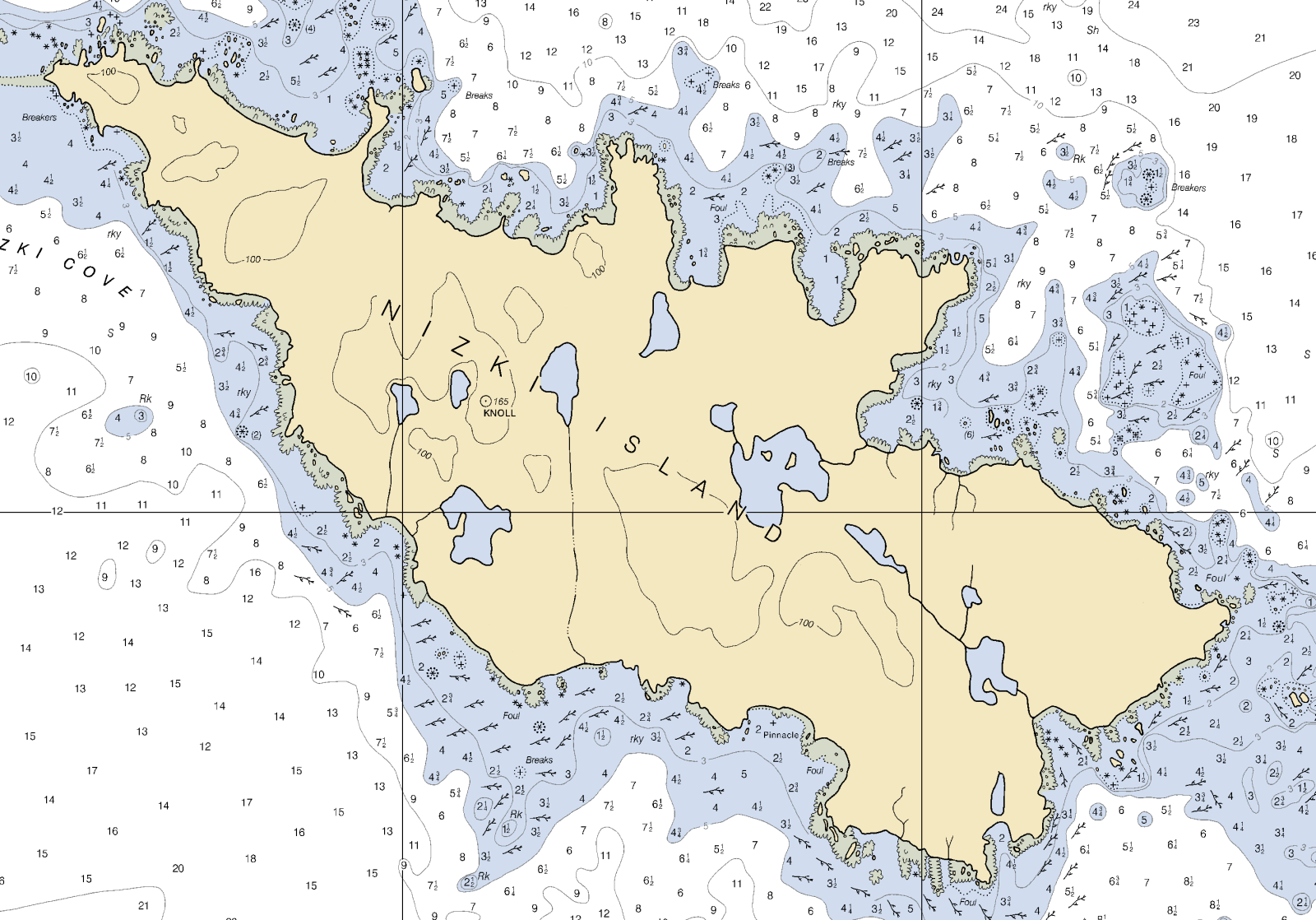
- Nautical Chart of Nizki Island

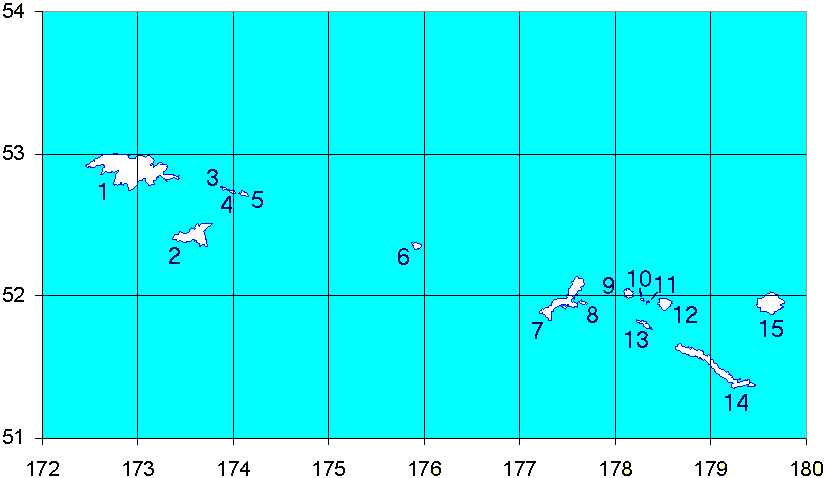
- 4 - Nizki

Geography
- Archipelago: Semichi Islands
- Highest elevation: 165 ft (50.3 m)

Administration
- United States
- State: Alaska

Demographics
- Population: 0

Nizki Island (Avayax̂ in Aleut; Russian: Низкий) is an uninhabited island in the Aleutian Islands in the U.S. state of Alaska. Located at 52°44′28″N 173°59′08″E, it is the middle island of the Semichi Islands group of the Near Islands. Flanked by Shemya to the east and Alaid to the west, three-mile-long (5 km) Nizki is periodically joined to Alaid by a sand spit. The name derived from the Russian word nizkiy, meaning "low," a term descriptive of the island's topography, with a maximum elevation of 165 ft (50 m). Nizki's shoreline is irregular and is fringed by rocks, reefs, and kelp-marked shoals.

Foxes were introduced to Nizki Island by Russian fur traders in the 19th century. This decimated the population of a number of bird species on the island. The last fox was removed from Nizki Island in 1976, and now Aleutian Canada Geese (once believed to be extinct), Puffins, and Aleutian Terns are common on the island.
