= Agattu =

Island in Alaska, United States

Coordinates: 52°26′07″N 173°34′32″E

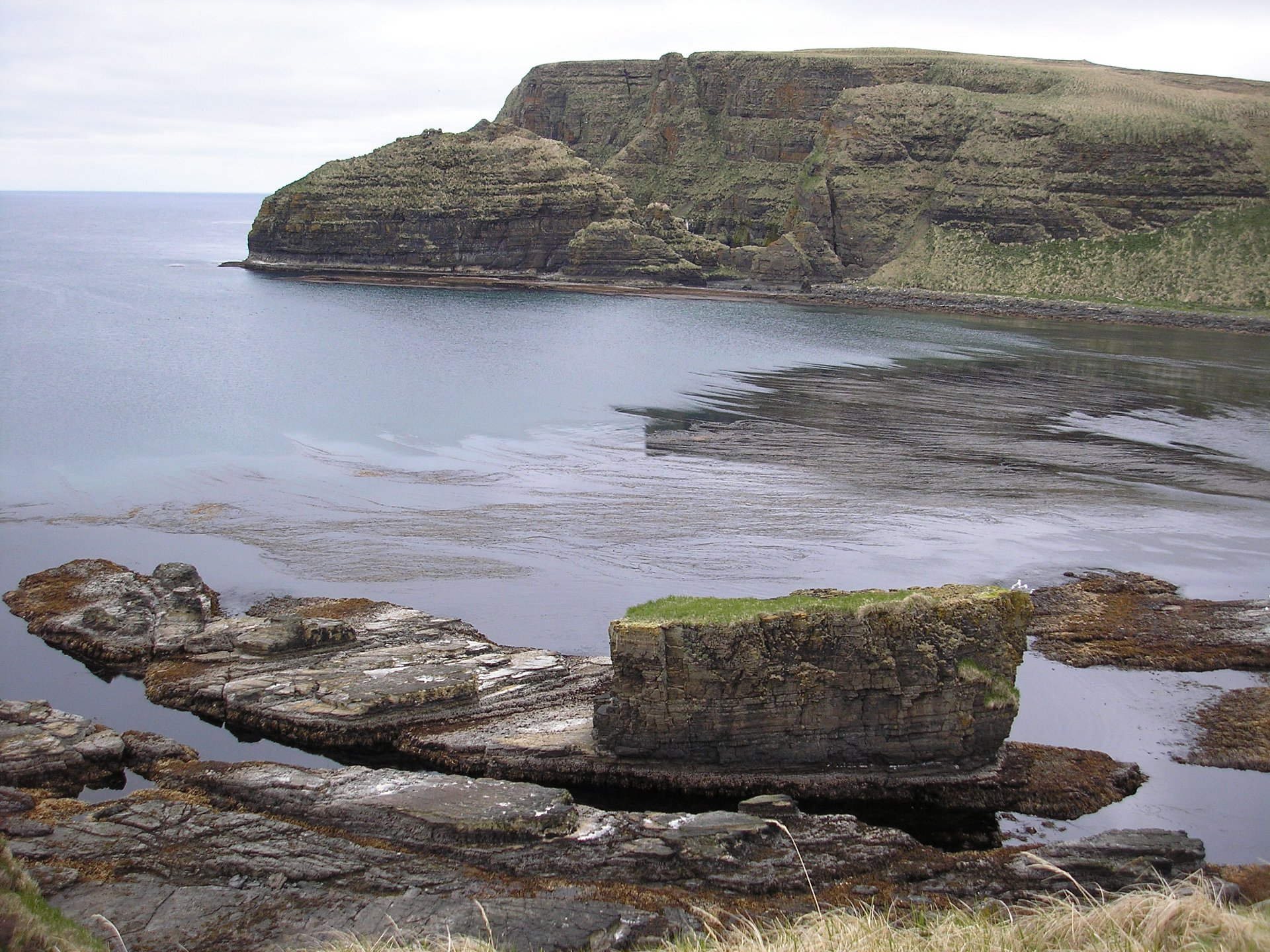
Agattu in 2018

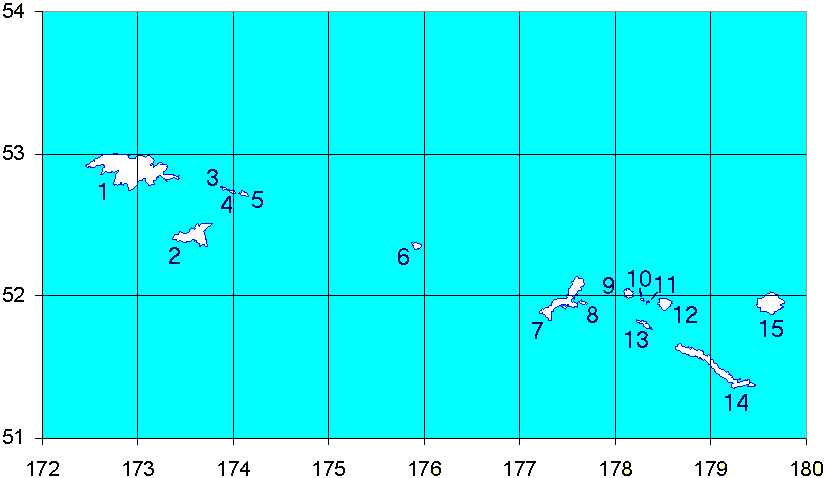
Map of the western Aleutian Islands. Agattu is marked 2.

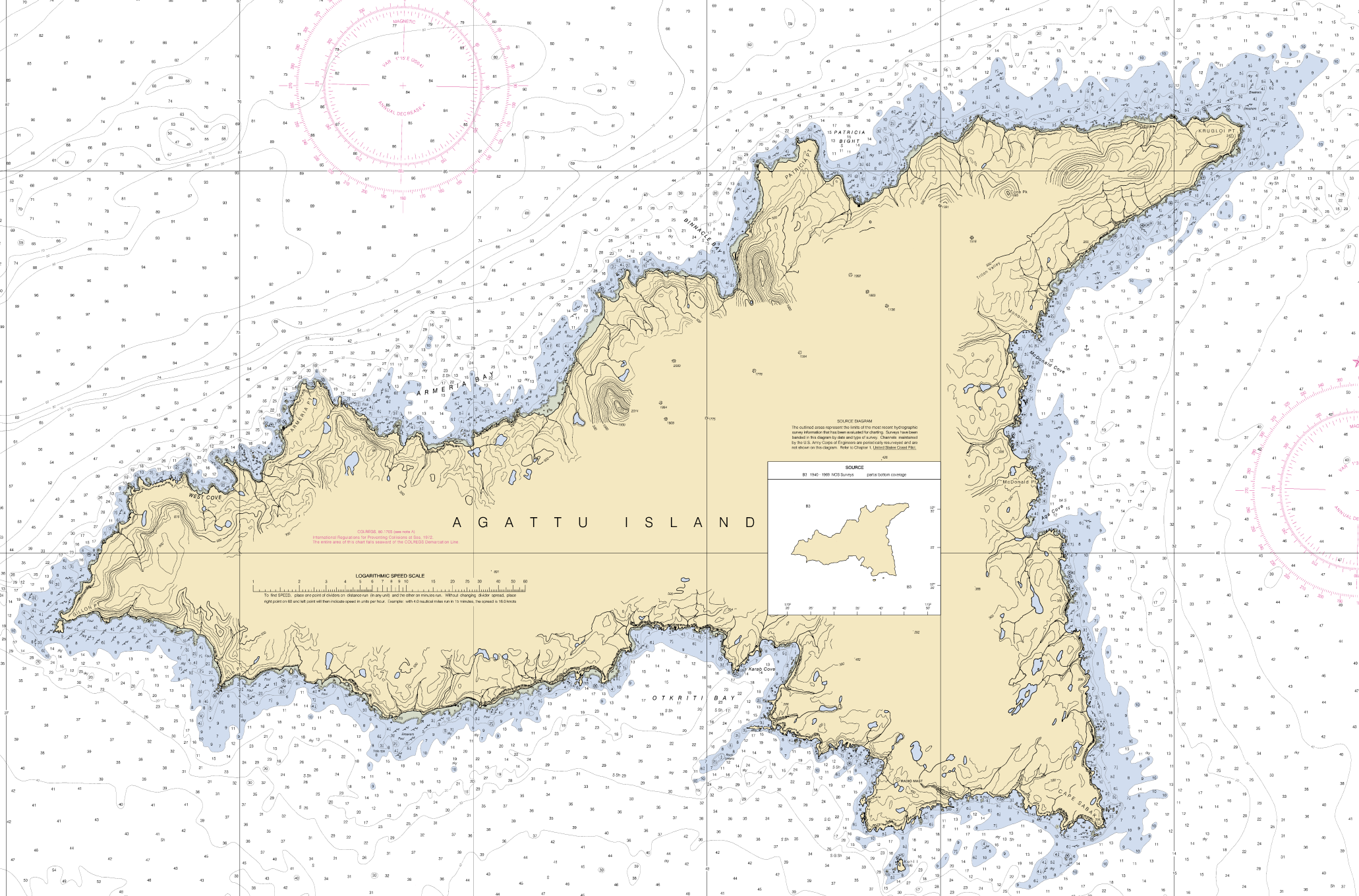
Nautical chart of Agattu Island

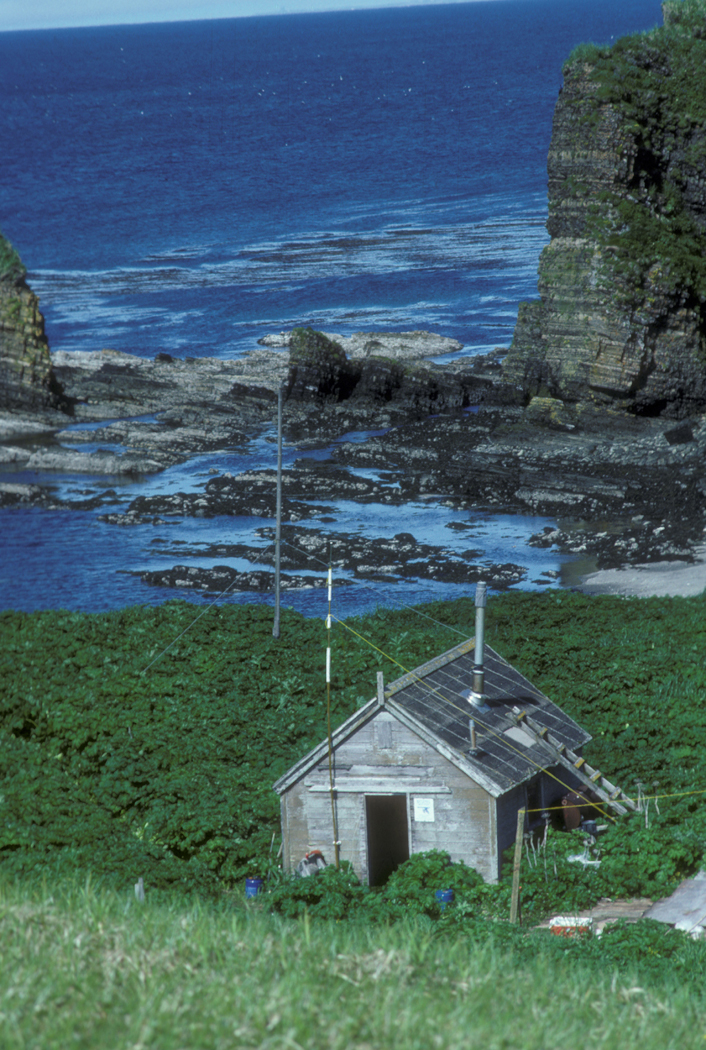
Agattu Island, refuge cabin, Aleutians 1988. Courtesy: USFWS.

Agattu (Aleut: Angatux̂; Russian: Агатту) is an island in Alaska, part of the Near Islands in the western end of the Aleutian Islands. With a land area of 85.558 square miles (221.59 km^{2}) Agattu is one of the largest uninhabited islands in the Aleutians. It is the second largest of the Near Islands, after Attu Island. It is volcanic and considerably mountainous. The treeless island has a tundra-like terrain which reaches a peak of 2,073 feet (632 m) above sea level. Its length is 19 miles (30 km) and width is 12.2 miles (19.7 km).

== Environment ==
Agattu has been recognised as an Important Bird Area (IBA) by BirdLife International. It has seven large seabird colonies, and an estimated population of 66,000 birds. About 1% of the global population of red-faced cormorants and tufted puffins nest on the island. Other inhabitants include rock sandpiper, red-necked phalarope, grey-crowned rosy finch and snow bunting. Aleutian cackling geese were reintroduced to the island after foxes were eliminated from the island in the 1970s. The elimination of the foxes on the island also made it possible for conservationists to reintroduce the Evermann's rock ptarmigan (Lagopus muta evermanni). In 2006 there were reports of at least 25 breeding pairs of the ptarmigan on the island.

== Geology ==
Agattu is unique among the volcanic Aleutian Islands in being composed almost entirely of well-bedded sedimentary rocks. These rocks were clearly deposited in water and are composed chiefly of amorphous silica and fine detritus derived from a volcanic terrain. Igneous rocks are sparsely represented by intrusions of porphyry, diabase, and trap. The entire island has been heavily glaciated.

== Inhabitants ==
Archeological excavations have discovered evidence and remains of Aleuts living on Agattu Island as early as 760 BCE. Based on the number of simultaneously inhabited archeological sites on the island, experts have estimated that the pre-contact population may have reached 500–1000 individuals. After Russian contact with the Aleutians in 1751, the population on Agattu declined precipitously. Russian traders would stay multiple years at a time in the Near islands hunting sea otter. Interactions with the Aleuts were sometimes violent. A veteran Russian navigator was killed by the locals on Agattu in 1761. By the 1760s, all Near Islanders had moved into a single village on Attu Island. During World War II, the villagers of Attu were interned in Japan and at war's end the survivors were resettled on Atka Island.
