= Near Islands =

Group of Aleutian Islands in Alaska, United States

Native name: Sasignan tanangin
- Location within Alaska

Geography
- Location: Pacific Ocean
- Coordinates: 52°48′02″N 173°07′54″E
- Total islands: 15
- Major islands: Attu, Agattu
- Area: 441.618 sq mi (1,143.79 km^{2})
- Length: 25 mi (40 km)

Administration
- United States
- State: Alaska

Demographics
- Population: >47 (2000)
- Ethnic groups: Aleut

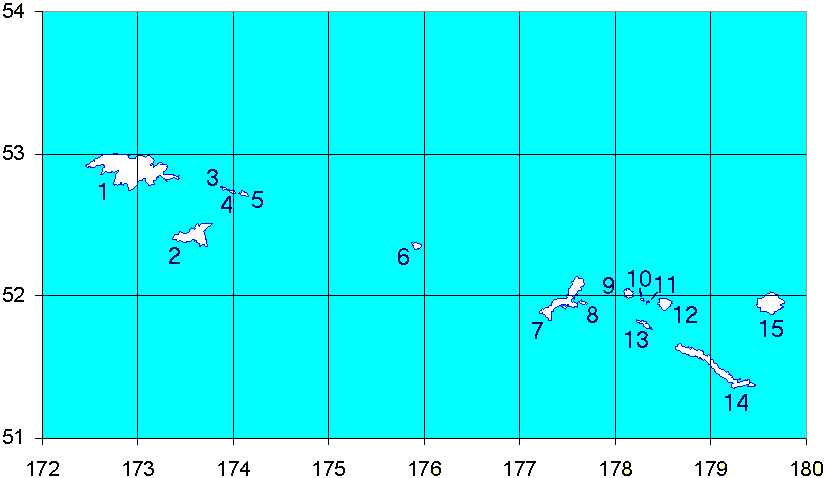
Map of the western Aleutian Islands, showing the Near Islands on the left: Attu Island (1), Agattu Island (2), Alaid Island (3), Nizki Island (4), and Shemya Island (5).

The Near Islands or the Sasignan Islands (Aleut: Sasignan tanangin, Russian: Ближние острова) are a group of volcanic islands in the Aleutian Islands in southwestern Alaska, between the Russian Commander Islands to the west and Buldir Island and the Rat Islands to the east.

== Geography ==
The largest of the Near Islands are Attu and Agattu, which shelter a few rocks in the channel between them. The other important islands are the Semichi Islands to their northeast, notable among which are Alaid, Nizki, and Shemya.

About 20 miles (30 km) to the east-southeast from Shemya are small rocky reefs known as the Ingenstrem Rocks.

The total land area of all of the Near Islands is 1,143.785 km^{2} (441.618 sq mi), and their total population was 47 persons as of the 2000 census. The only populated island is Shemya; the U.S. Coast Guard station on Attu was decommissioned on August 27, 2010 and the last 20 inhabitants left the island.

On July 17, 2017, a major earthquake with a moment magnitude scale of 7.7 struck the Aleutian arc, with an epicenter west of Attu. The earthquake produced a measurable tsunami that was detected at tide gauges across the Pacific ocean; a tide gauge located at Shemya, Alaska measured a tsunami height of 10 cm (3.9 in).

== History ==
The name “Near Islands” was already in use by the late eighteenth century. William Coxe (1787), drawing on earlier Russian sources, referred to the group as the “Nearest Aleütian Islands”. The name is generally understood to derive from the Russian designation Blizhnie Ostrova (“Near Islands”), referring to the westernmost group of the Aleutian chain. However, no surviving primary source has been identified that explicitly states who coined the name or explains the reasoning behind it.

By World War II, the native Aleut population had declined across the Aleutian Islands, and their population on the Near Islands was concentrated on a settlement on Attu Island. Agattu was previously inhabited prior to Russia's discovery of the Aleutian Islands, with an estimated peak population of around 500 to 1,000. However, by the 1760s all Near Islanders had moved to Attu. During World War II, the Imperial Japanese Army occupied Attu in 1942, being the first foreign military to occupy American soil since the War of 1812. 41 of Attu's native Aleut inhabitants were taken to a Japanese internment camp near Otaru, Hokkaido, with 16 dying to tuberculosis and starvation. A white woman on the island named Etta Jones was also taken to Yokohama, Japan, along with captured Australian nurses from Rabaul. American forces retook Attu during the Aleutian Islands campaign in 1943.

== Flora and fauna ==
Bald Eagles, which are common in the eastern and central Aleutian Islands, are much rarer in this part of the chain. The Near Islands and the Rat Islands represent their westernmost natural habitat, and their only extension into the Eastern Hemisphere, since these two islands groups run past the 180th meridian. Pairs have been observed on Agattu in 1937 and 1963 and also on neighboring Buldir Island. Prior to the 21st Century, there is only a single record on Shemya (one of the westernmost islands), which occurred on May 3, 1987.

== Gallery ==
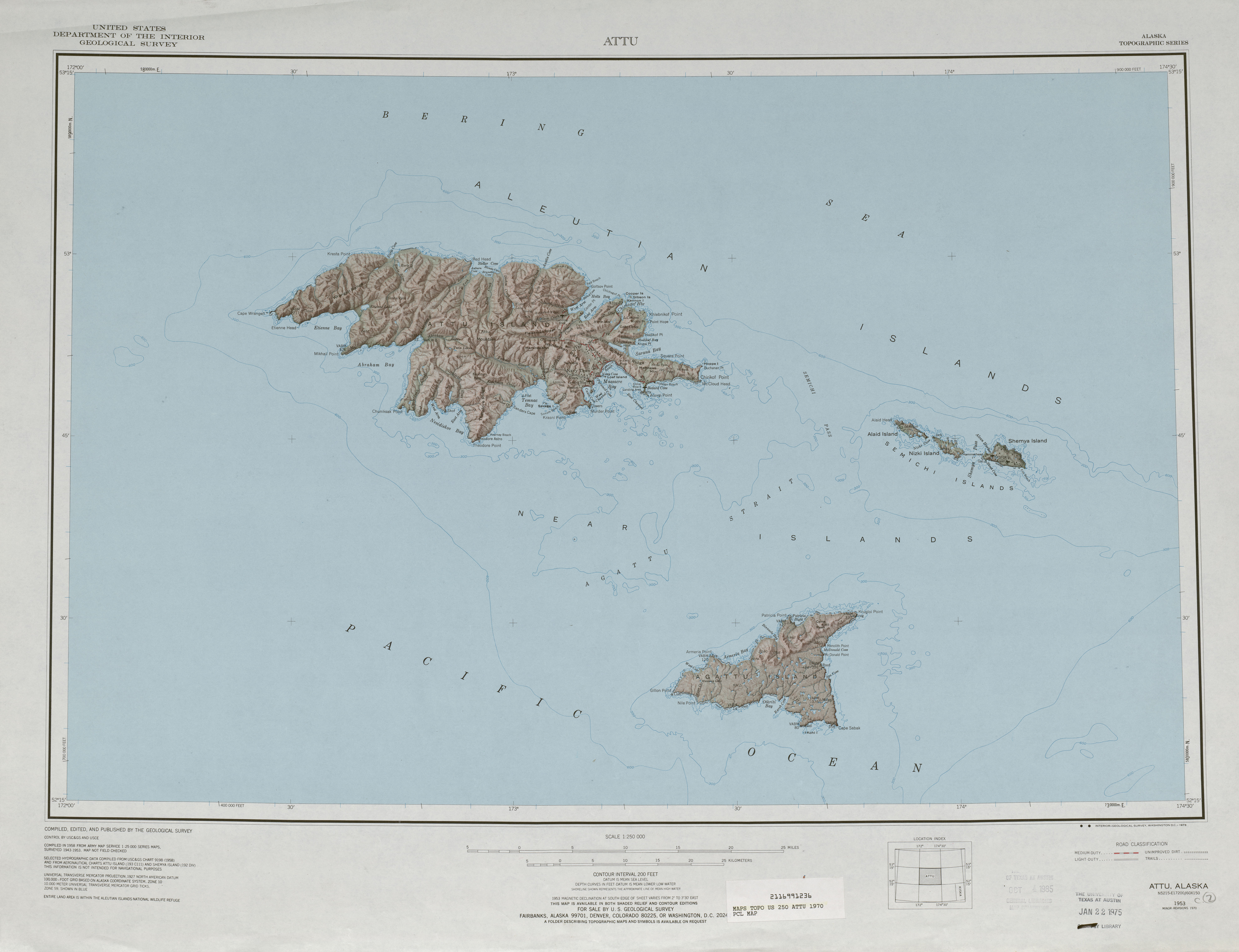
Topographic map sheet

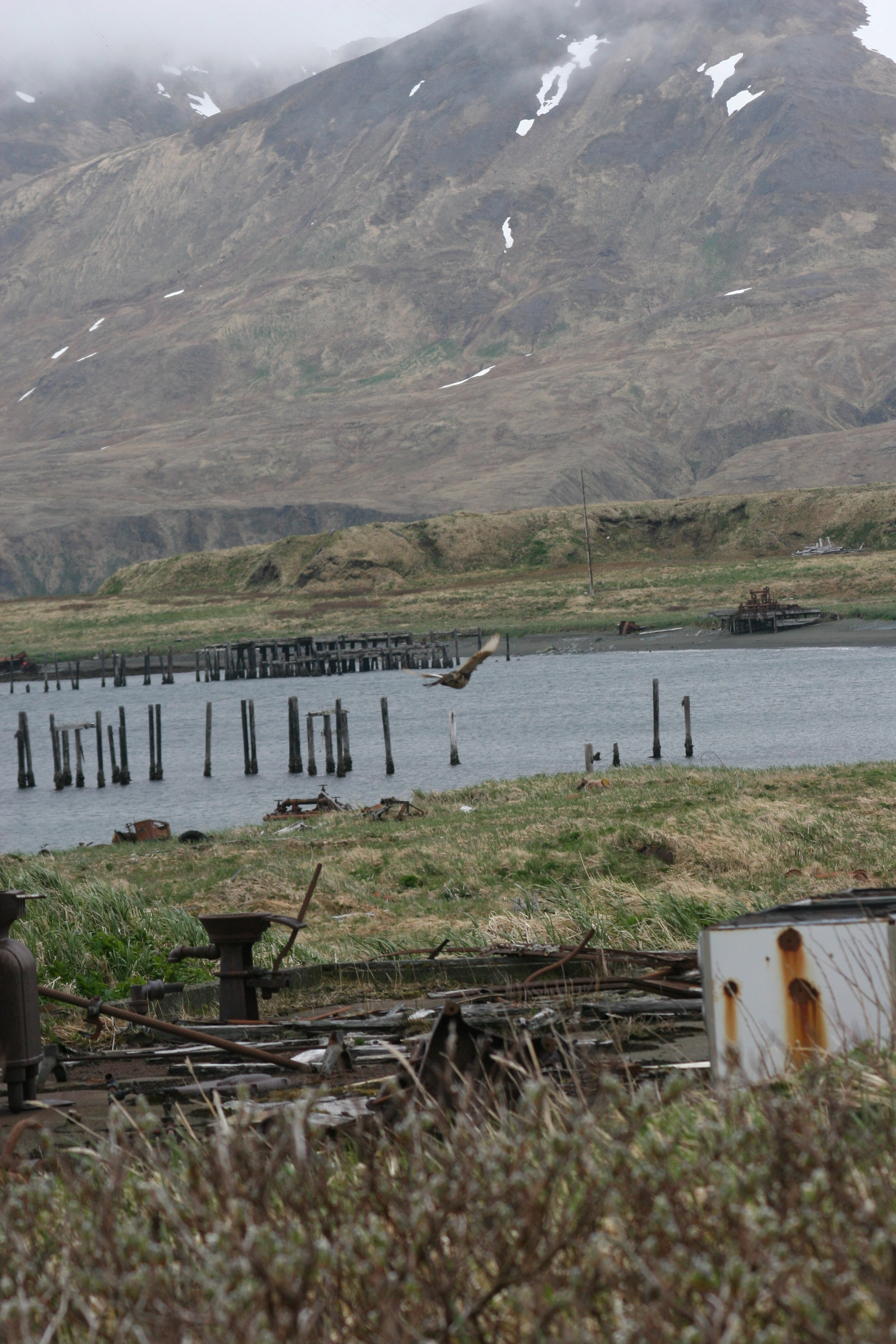
Attu Island in 2008

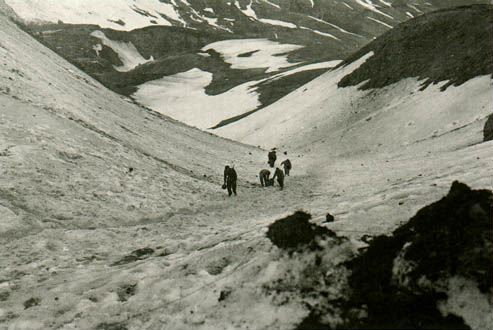
United States troops hauling supplies on Attu Island in May 1943.
