= Alaid Island (Alaska) =

Coordinates: 52°45′46″N 173°53′53″E

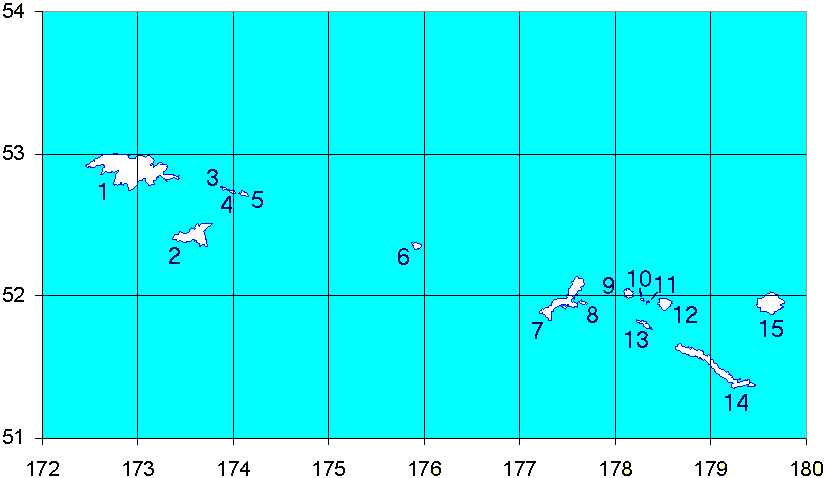
The western Aleutian Islands, Alaid is marked 3.

Alaid Island (Igingiinax̂ in Aleut, Russian: Алаид) is the westernmost of the Semichi Islands, a subgroup of the Near Islands group that lies at the extreme western end of the Aleutian Islands, Alaska.
