= Shemya =

Site in the Aleutian Islands archipelago

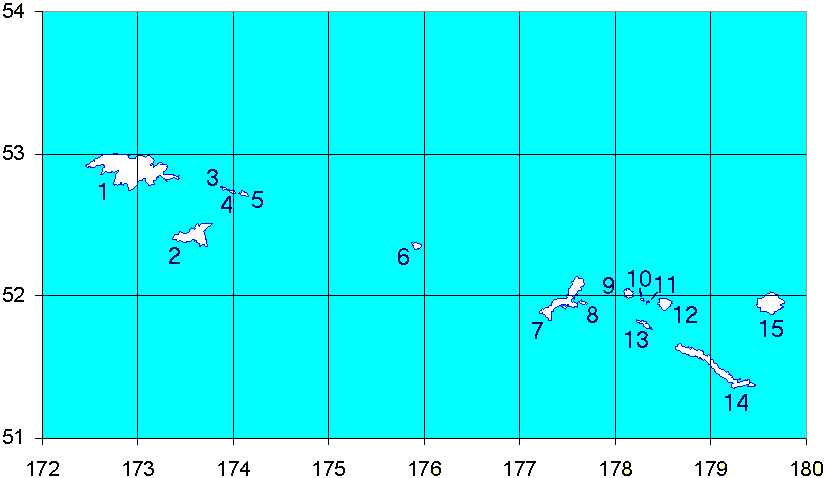
5 - Shemya Island

Shemya or Simiya (Aleut: Samiyax̂) is a small island in the Semichi Islands group of the Near Islands chain in the Aleutian Islands archipelago southwest of Alaska, at 52°43′27″N 174°07′08″E. It has a land area of 5.903 sq mi (15.29 km^{2}), and is about 1,200 miles (1,900 km) southwest of Anchorage, Alaska. It is 2.73 miles (4.39 km) wide and 4.32 miles (6.95 km) long.

== History ==
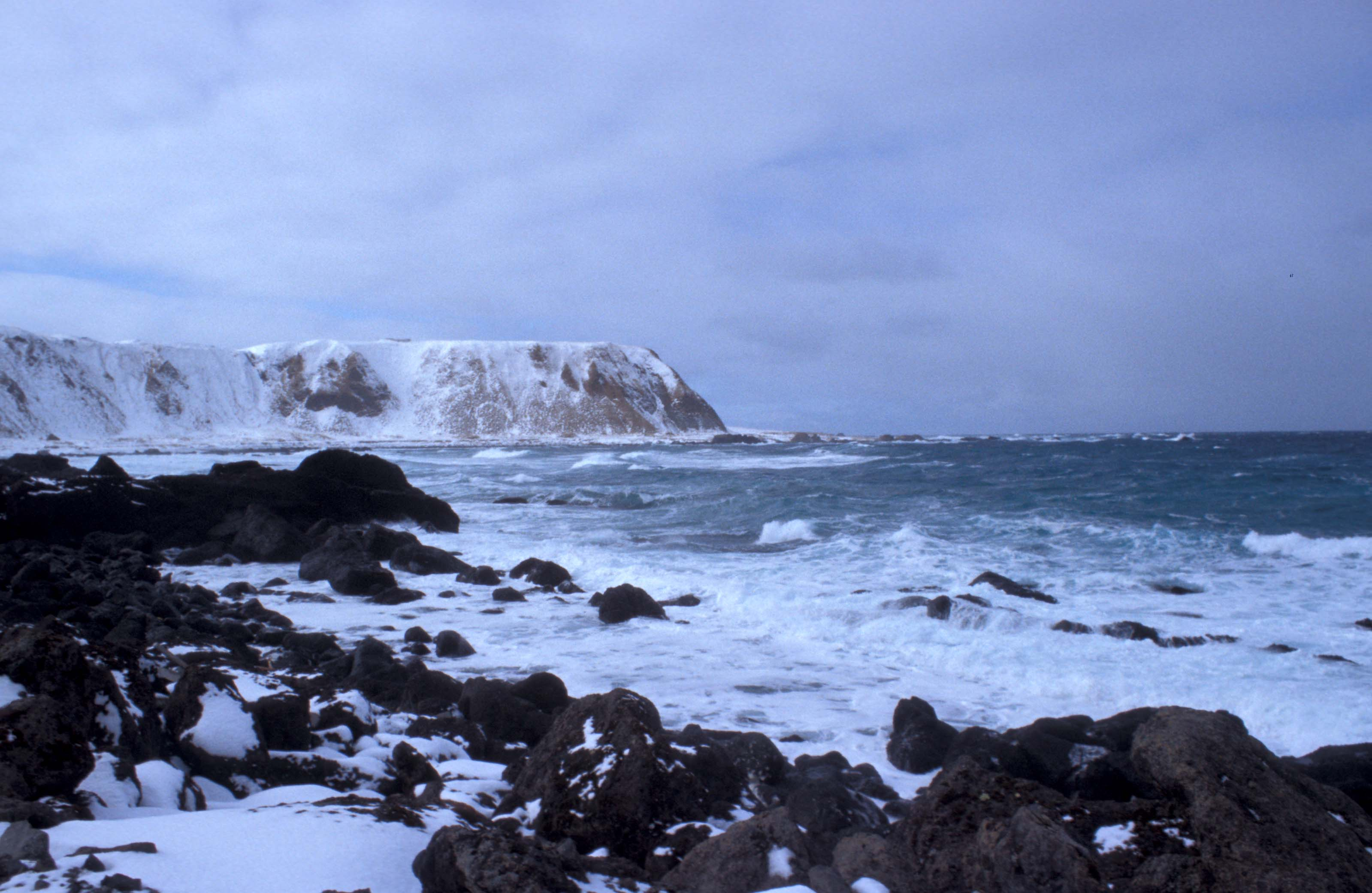
Shemya Island north shore

The Russian vessel Saint Peter and Paul was wrecked at Shemya in 1762. Most of the crew survived.

In 1943, a United States Air Force radar surveillance, weather station, aircraft refueling station, and a 10,000-foot-long (3,000 m) runway opened on Shemya and are still in operation. At its peak in the 1960s, the station, originally Shemya Air Force Base or Shemya Station, had 1,500 workers. In 1956, Northwest Airlines leased Shemya Island from the U.S. government to use as a refueling station on their North Pacific route. According to Northwest's website, that made them "the first airline to operate its own airport." Northwest was operating Lockheed Constellation L-1049G model propliners on its "Orient Express" service between the U.S. and Asia in 1956.

During the height of the Cold War, the United States Air Force airborne intelligence platforms "Cobra Ball", "Rivet Amber," and "Rivet Ball" flew intercontinental ballistic missile tracking flights from this island near the Soviet Union, especially the Kamchatka Peninsula. Observations from Shemya were normally the first radar reports of new Soviet satellite launches from Tyuratam (Baikonur) in the early days of satellite tracking; see Project Space Track.

In 1993, the station was renamed the Eareckson Air Station to honor USAF Colonel William O. Eareckson, who had commanded bomber operations during the Aleutian Campaign of World War II.

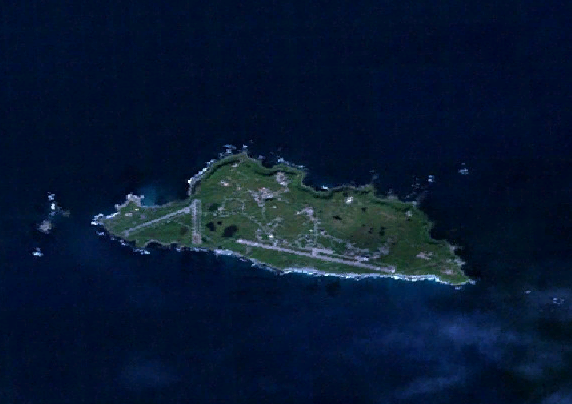
A landsat image of Shemya Island.

The station still operates as a radar station and aircraft refueling station with a staff of about 180 people. The 2000 census reported an official resident population of 27 persons on the island.

One of the most recognizable features of the island is the COBRA DANE radar system. This radar was built in 1976 and brought on-line in 1977 for the primary mission of intelligence gathering in support of verification of the Strategic Arms Limitation Talks (SALT) II agreement.

Shemya was an important outpost during the Cold War; as part of Project Bluegrass, the White Alice Communications System provided a vital tropospheric scatter communications link to the mainland during the early-1960s to late-1970s. Its two 120-foot (37 m) parabolic reflectors and 50 kW transmitter output bridged the nearly 400 miles (640 km) gap to Adak, Alaska.

=== List of commercial flights diverted to Shemya ===
See also Eareckson Air Station § Accidents and incidents.

- China Eastern Airlines Flight 583 made an emergency landing at the island's airbase at April 6, 1993.
- American Airlines Flight 175, a Boeing 777-200ER, from Dallas Fort Worth, Texas (DFW/KDFW) to Tokyo Narita, Japan (NRT/RJAA) made an emergency landing due to indication of cargo fire on July 11, 2010.
- Cathay Pacific Flight 884 from Hong Kong to Los Angeles made an emergency landing at the island's airbase due to smoke detection on July 29, 2015.
- Delta Air Lines Flight 128 from Beijing to Seattle made an emergency landing on the island's airbase on December 24, 2018, when the Boeing 767-300ER developed engine problems.
- Polar Air Cargo Flight 717 made an emergency landing at the island's airport on March 13, 2020.
- FedEx Express Flight 9796, a Boeing 777-F2S flying from Anchorage Ted Stevens International Airport to Hanoi Noi Bai International Airport, diverted to Shemya Eareckson Air Station on October 1, 2024 due a #1 engine failure.
- FedEx Express Flight 9080, an Airbus A300F4-600 flying from Taiwan Taoyuan International Airport to Anchorage Ted Stevens International Airport, declared emergency and diverted to Shemya Eareckson Air Station on November 5, 2025, after receiving a fuel leak indication.

=== Former airline service ===
Reeve Aleutian Airways (RAA) operated scheduled passenger service into Shemya for many years. During the 1970s and 1980s, Reeve operated nonstop flights to Anchorage (ANC) with Lockheed L-188 Electra turboprop aircraft. By 1989, the airline was operating nonstop jet service to Anchorage with Boeing 727-100 combi aircraft which were capable of transporting passengers and freight on the main deck of the aircraft. Reeve's 727 service from Anchorage continued during the 1990s as did 727 flights from Adak Island, AK and Cold Bay, AK. Reeve Aleutian ceased all flight operations in 2000.

== Climate ==
The weather on Shemya is very drastic, though the temperatures vary only between single digits and the mid-fifties. The climate is perhaps the most equatorward low-altitude occurrence of a polar climate (ET) in the world, though it is extremely close to a subpolar oceanic climate (Cfc), or a subarctic climate if the 0 degree Celsius isotherm is used. The island weather is most likely to be cloudy with a mist. The wind ranges from 30 to 40 miles per hour (48 to 64 km/h).

The Japanese current in the Pacific to the south of the island regulates the temperature and gives it the pronounced temperature lag. August and September are the warmest months. The island's record low occurred in April. Despite it being a tundra climate, it is spared the vicious cold of places like Utqiagvik, Alaska, where temperatures in winter can rival those of interior Alaska in winter.

Climate data for Shemya (1961–1990 normals, extremes 1943–1995)
Month	Jan	Feb	Mar	Apr	May	Jun	Jul	Aug	Sep	Oct	Nov	Dec	Year
Record high °F (°C)	44 (7)	44 (7)	43 (6)	47 (8)	48 (9)	57 (14)	64 (18)	63 (17)	59 (15)	54 (12)	48 (9)	48 (9)	64 (18)
Mean maximum °F (°C)	38.5 (3.6)	38.3 (3.5)	39.1 (3.9)	41.3 (5.2)	45.4 (7.4)	49.6 (9.8)	55.1 (12.8)	56.6 (13.7)	54.5 (12.5)	50.3 (10.2)	45.3 (7.4)	41.1 (5.1)	57.7 (14.3)
Mean daily maximum °F (°C)	33.7 (0.9)	33.1 (0.6)	34.7 (1.5)	37.7 (3.2)	41.2 (5.1)	44.6 (7.0)	48.9 (9.4)	51.6 (10.9)	50.7 (10.4)	45.4 (7.4)	39.2 (4.0)	35.6 (2.0)	41.4 (5.2)
Daily mean °F (°C)	31.0 (−0.6)	30.5 (−0.8)	31.9 (−0.1)	35.0 (1.7)	38.6 (3.7)	42.2 (5.7)	46.6 (8.1)	49.2 (9.6)	47.8 (8.8)	42.2 (5.7)	36.0 (2.2)	32.8 (0.4)	38.7 (3.7)
Mean daily minimum °F (°C)	28.2 (−2.1)	27.8 (−2.3)	29.0 (−1.7)	32.2 (0.1)	35.9 (2.2)	39.8 (4.3)	44.2 (6.8)	46.8 (8.2)	44.9 (7.2)	39.0 (3.9)	32.8 (0.4)	29.9 (−1.2)	35.9 (2.2)
Mean minimum °F (°C)	18.2 (−7.7)	18.1 (−7.7)	20.5 (−6.4)	25.3 (−3.7)	30.9 (−0.6)	35.9 (2.2)	40.7 (4.8)	43.0 (6.1)	37.8 (3.2)	31.8 (−0.1)	24.9 (−3.9)	20.5 (−6.4)	15.6 (−9.1)
Record low °F (°C)	9 (−13)	7 (−14)	11 (−12)	18 (−8)	24 (−4)	29 (−2)	36 (2)	38 (3)	33 (1)	26 (−3)	15 (−9)	7 (−14)	7 (−14)
Average precipitation inches (mm)	2.49 (63)	1.96 (50)	1.90 (48)	1.82 (46)	1.65 (42)	1.87 (47)	2.69 (68)	4.11 (104)	2.93 (74)	3.83 (97)	4.04 (103)	2.95 (75)	32.24 (819)
Average snowfall inches (cm)	15.6 (40)	13.7 (35)	11.0 (28)	5.2 (13)	1.4 (3.6)	0.0 (0.0)	0.0 (0.0)	0.0 (0.0)	0.0 (0.0)	1.1 (2.8)	8.2 (21)	14.5 (37)	70.7 (180)
Average precipitation days (≥ 0.01 inch)	22.5	20.1	20.5	16.7	15.8	14.3	15.3	17.5	18.3	22.2	24.1	23.4	230.7
Average snowy days (≥ 0.01 inch)	18.8	17.4	16.3	9.1	2.1	0.0	0.0	0.0	0.0	1.6	11.8	16.9	94.0
Source 1: WRCC: Period of Record General Climate Summary Table
Source 2: XMACIS (snowfall)
