= Central Europe =

Region of Europe

Different views of Central Europe

The cultural-spatial borders of Europe according to the Standing Committee on Geographical Names, Germany. The map displays two different segment-bordering ways superimposed on each other.

Central Europe according to The World Factbook (2009), and Brockhaus Enzyklopädie (1998).

Central Europe is a geographical region of Europe between Eastern, Southern, Western, and Northern Europe. Central Europe is known for its cultural diversity; however, countries in this region also share certain historical and cultural similarities.

The region is variously defined but often includes Austria, Croatia, the Czech Republic, Germany, Hungary, Liechtenstein, Lithuania, Poland, Slovakia, Slovenia, Switzerland, Transylvania, and Vojvodina. Throughout much of the early modern period, the territories of Poland and Lithuania were part of the Polish–Lithuanian Commonwealth. Meanwhile, the Ottoman Empire came to occupy most of present-day Croatia and present-day Hungary, and southern parts of present-day Slovakia. The various German Principalities, the Kingdom of Bohemia (present-day Czech Republic), the Duchy of Carniola (part of present-day Slovenia), and the Old Swiss Confederacy were within the Holy Roman Empire. During the 18th century, the Habsburg monarchy came to reign over the territories of Austria, Croatia, the Czech Republic, Hungary, Slovakia and Slovenia, alongside parts of Serbia, Germany, Italy and Switzerland. Between the early 18th and the early 20th centuries, Central Europe had a substantial Jewish population.

Since the Cold War, the countries that make up Central Europe have historically been and in some cases continue to be divided into either Eastern or Western Europe. After World War II, Europe was divided by the Iron Curtain into two parts, the capitalist Western Bloc and the socialist Eastern Bloc, although Austria, Switzerland and Yugoslavia (encompassing the territories of present-day Croatia, Slovenia and various other South Slavic nations) declared neutrality. The Berlin Wall was one of the most visible symbols of this division. Respectively, countries in Central Europe have historical, cultural and geopolitical ties with these wider regions of Europe.

Central Europe began a "strategic awakening" in the late 20th and early 21st centuries, with initiatives such as the Central European Defence Cooperation, the Central European Initiative, Centrope, and the Visegrád Four Group. That awakening was accelerated by writers and other intellectuals, who recognized the societal paralysis of decaying dictatorships and felt compelled to speak out against Soviet oppression.

== Historical perspective ==
=== Middle Ages and early modern period ===
In the Early Middle Ages, Central Europe had a diverse landscape, with various ethnic groups inhabiting the region. Following the fall of Roman rule in the 5th century, Germanic tribes conquered parts of the west. Among them were the Franks, Alemans and Bavarians. Slavic tribes were predominantly in the east, with the West Slavs having migrated from the Slavic urheimat in the area of modern-day Ukraine and Belarus. The region encompassed a wide spectrum of additional tribes and communities.

From the late 6th century to the early 9th century, the area roughly corresponding to the Carpathian Basin was part of the Avar Khaganate, the realm of the Carpathian Avars. While the Avars dominated the east of what is now Austria, its north and south were under Germanic and Slavic influence, respectively. Meanwhile, the territories now comprising Germany and Switzerland were under the influence of the Merovingian dynasty, and later the Carolingian dynasty. Various Slavic tribes that inhabited eastern Central Europe established settlements during this period, primarily in present-day Croatia, Czech Republic, Poland, Slovakia and Slovenia. In the 7th century, the South Slavic principality of Carantania was established in the area of modern-day southern Austria and northeastern Slovenia. The territory of Lithuania was inhabited by Baltic tribes. Amongst them were the Samogitians, Lithuanians and Curonians.

The Holy Roman Empire was founded at the turn of the 9th century, following the coronation of Charlemagne by Pope Leo III. At its inception, it incorporated present-day Germany and nearby regions, including parts of what is now Austria, the Czech Republic, Slovenia and Switzerland. Three decades later, Great Moravia, centred on present-day Czech Republic and Slovakia, became one of the first West Slavic states to be founded in Central Europe. The state was dominated by the Moravians and Slovaks, also incorporating Bohemians when it expanded into the Bohemian lands. Great Moravia reached its height in the late 9th Century. It was at this time that the Hungarian tribes, having migrated westward on the Eurasian Steppe, overcame advances from the First Bulgarian Empire, Great Moravia and the East Franks, and settled in the Carpathian Basin. Following from the earlier Duchy of Croatia, the Kingdom of Croatia was established in 925, liberating the territory from Frankish suzerainty. The Kingdom of Croatia cooperated with the Byzantine Empire against the expansion of the First Bulgarian Empire. In 966, the first Polish duchy, Civitas Schinesghe, was established. This is considered the predecessor state of the Kingdom of Poland.

Following the Christianization of various Central European countries, elements of cultural unity emerged within the region, specifically Catholicism and Latin. Eastern and Southeastern Europe remained predominantly Eastern Orthodox, and were dominated by Byzantine cultural influence. After the East–West Schism in 1054, significant parts of Eastern Europe developed cultural unity and resistance to Catholic Western and Central Europe within the framework of the Eastern Orthodox Church, Church Slavonic and the Cyrillic alphabet.

Frankish Empire and its tributaries in 814

East Francia in 843

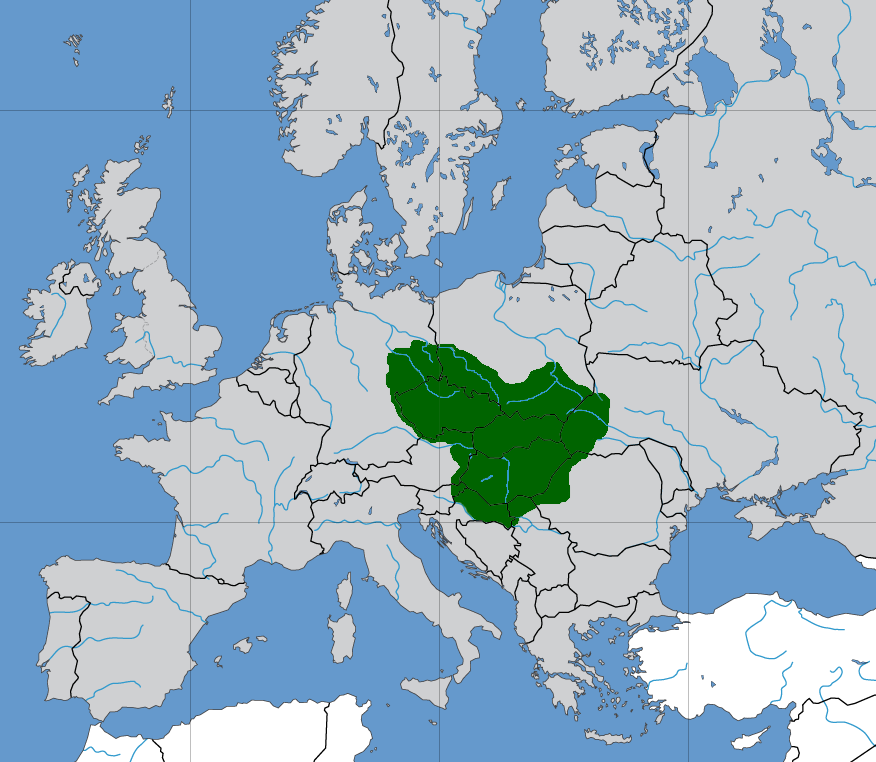
Possible furthest extent of Great Moravia under Svatopluk I (870–894)

Duchy of Poland under the Piast dynasty in 1000

Duchy of Bohemia (Czech Duchy) in 1000

Kingdom of Germany in 1004

Kingdom of Hungary in 1190

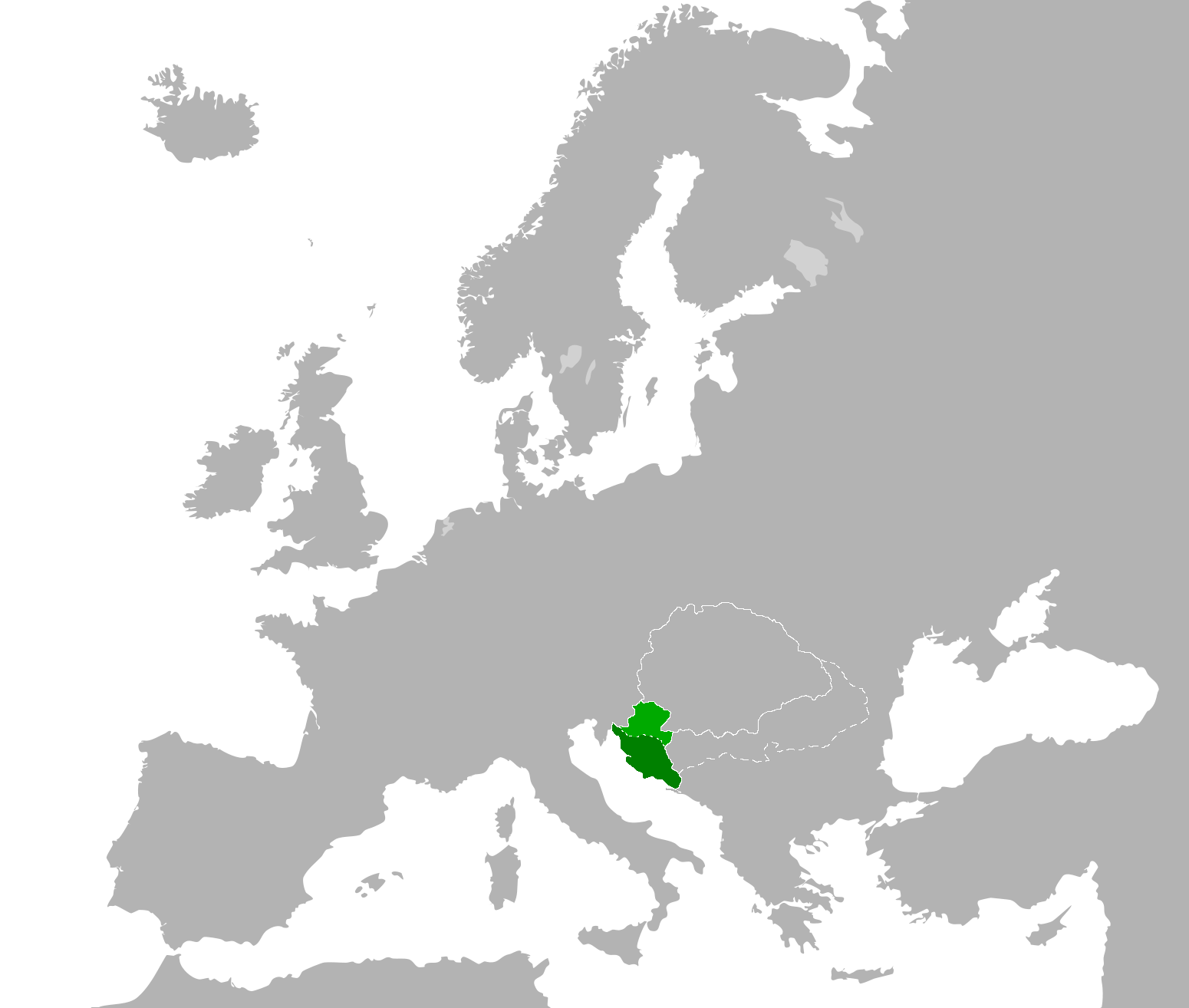
Kingdom of Croatia in 1260

Holy Roman Empire in 1600

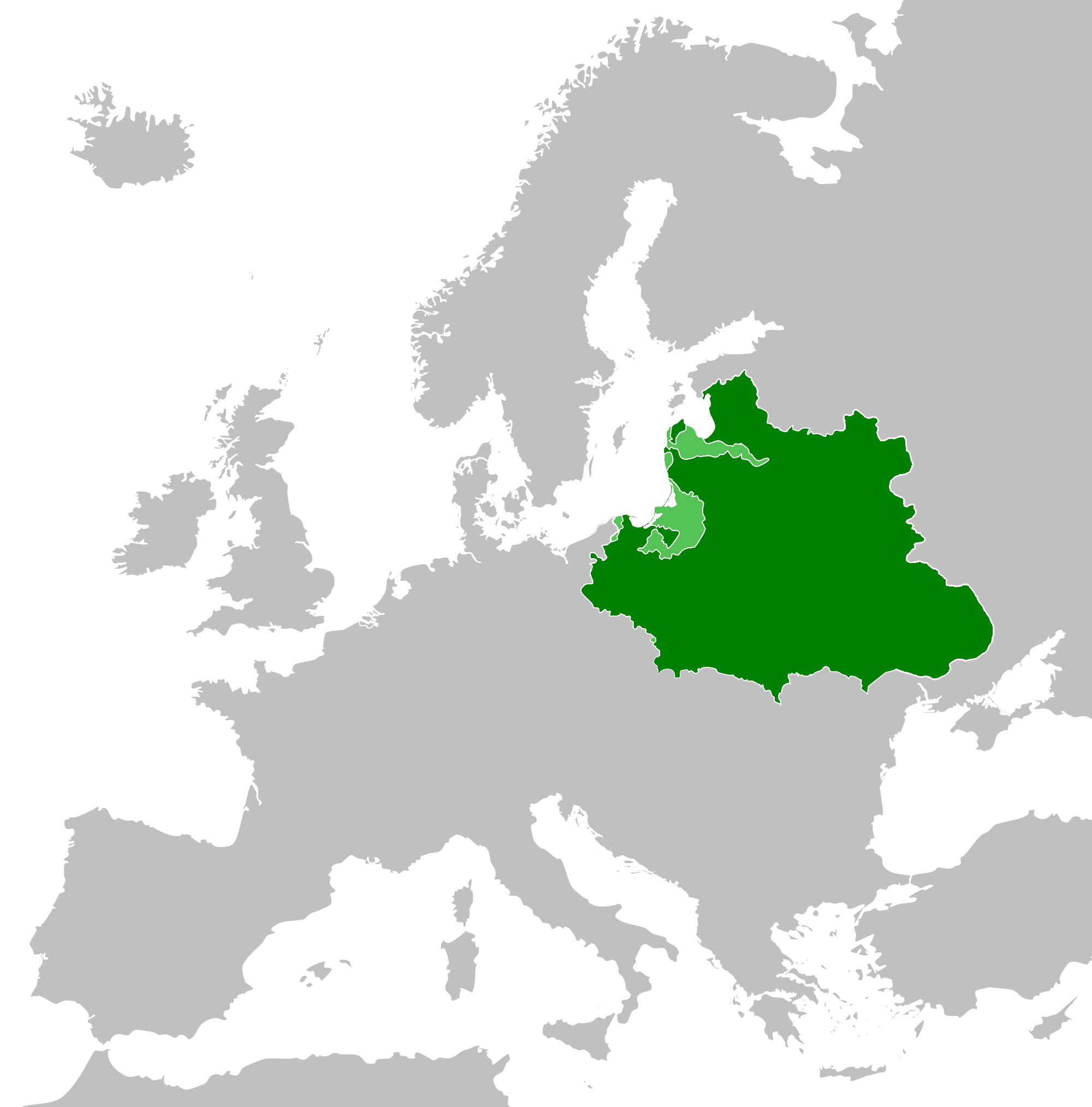
Polish–Lithuanian Commonwealth and its fiefs in 1619

German Confederation in 1815

Austrian Empire in 1815

According to the historian Jenő Szűcs, Central Europe at the end of the 1st millennium became influenced by Western European developments. Szűcs argued that between the 11th and 15th centuries, Christianization influenced the cultures within Central Europe, and well-defined social features were also implemented in the region based on Western characteristics. The keyword of Western social development after the turn of the millennium was the spread of Magdeburg rights in some cities and towns of Western Europe. They began to spread in the mid-13th century in Central European countries and brought about self-governments of towns and counties.

In 1335, the Kings of Poland, Bohemia, and Hungary and Croatia met in the castle of Visegrád and agreed to cooperate closely in the field of politics and commerce. That has inspired the post-Cold War Visegrád Group.

In 1386, Jogaila, the Grand Duke of Lithuania, converted to Christianity (specifically Catholicism) and subsequently became King of Poland through marriage to Queen Jadwiga of Poland. That initiated the Christianization of Lithuania and resulted in the Union of Krewo, signifying a personal union between the Grand Duchy of Lithuania and the Kingdom of Poland. The union commenced an enduring political alliance between the two entities and laid the foundations for the later establishment of the Polish–Lithuanian Commonwealth in 1569.

Between the 15th and the early 16th centuries, the Kingdom of Croatia, which was then in personal union with the Kingdom of Hungary, served as a significant maritime gateway of Central Europe, with its ports facilitating key trade routes between Central Europe and the Mediterranean. The Republic of Ragusa emerged as a prominent hub for cultural exchange during this time. Following the Ottoman and Habsburg wars of the 16th and 17th centuries, the Kingdom of Croatia, under Habsburg rule, began to regain its position as a significant trade route, restoring ports and revitalising commercial activity.

=== Before World War I ===
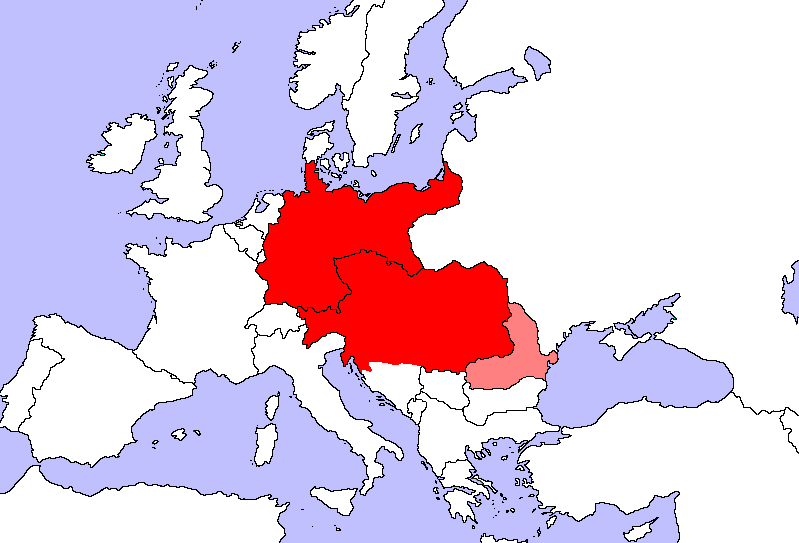
A view of Central Europe dating from the time before World War I (1902): Central European countries and regions: the German Empire and the Habsburg monarchy (without Bosnia and Herzegovina and Dalmatia) Adjacent country in Southeastern/Eastern Europe: Kingdom of Romania

Before 1870, the industrialization that had started to develop in Northwestern and Central Europe and the United States did not extend in any significant way to the rest of the world. Even in Eastern Europe, industrialization lagged far behind. Russia, for example, remained largely rural and agricultural, and its autocratic rulers kept the peasants in serfdom. The concept of Central Europe was already known at the beginning of the 19th century, but it developed further and became an object of intensive interest towards the 20th century. However, the first concept mixed science, politics, and economy and was strictly connected with the aspirations of German states to dominate a part of European continent called Mitteleuropa. At the Frankfurt Parliament, which was established in the wake of the March Revolution of 1848, there were multiple competing ideas for the integration of German-speaking areas, including the mitteleuropäische Lösung (Central European Solution) propagated by Austria, which sought to merge the smaller German-speaking states with the multi-ethnic Habsburg monarchy, but was opposed by Prussia and others. An imperialistic idea of Mitteleuropa also became popular in the German Empire, which was established in 1871 and experienced intensive economic growth. The term was used when the Union of German Railway Administrations established the Mitteleuropäische Eisenbahn-Zeit (Central European Railway Time) time zone, which was applied by the railways from 1 June 1891 and was later widely adopted in civilian life; the time zone's name has been shortened to the present-day Central European Time.

The German term denoting Central Europe was so fashionable that other languages started referring to it when indicating territories from Rhine to Vistula or even the Dnieper and from the Baltic Sea to the Balkans. An example of this vision of Central Europe may be seen in Joseph Partsch's book of 1903.

On 21 January 1904, Mitteleuropäischer Wirtschaftsverein (Central European Economic Association) was established in Berlin with economic integration of Germany and Austria (with eventual extension to Switzerland, Belgium and the Netherlands) as its main aim. Another time, the term Central Europe became connected to the German plans of political, economic, and cultural domination. The "bible" of the concept was Friedrich Naumann's book Mitteleuropa in which he called for an economic federation to be established after World War I. Naumann's proposed a federation with Germany and the Habsburg monarchy as its centre that would eventually unite all external European nations through economic prosperity. The concept failed after the German defeat in World War I. The revival of the idea may be observed during the Hitler era.

=== Interwar period ===
Interwar Central Europe according to Emmanuel de Martonne (1927)

CE countries, Sourcebook of Central European Avant-Gardes 1910–1930 (L.A. County Museum of Art)

The interwar period (1918–1938) brought a new geopolitical system, as well as economic and political problems, and the concept of Central Europe took on a different character. The centre of interest was moved to its eastern part, particularly to the countries that had reappeared on the map of Europe. Central Europe ceased to be the area of German aspiration to lead or dominate and became a territory of various integration movements aiming at resolving political, economic, and national problems of "new" states, being a way to face German and Soviet pressures. However, the conflict of interests was too major, and neither the Little Entente nor Intermarium (Międzymorze) ideas succeeded. The Hungarian historian Magda Ádám wrote in her study Versailles System and Central Europe (2006): "Today we know that the bane of Central Europe was the Little Entente, military alliance of Czechoslovakia, Romania and Kingdom of Serbs, Croats and Slovenes (later Yugoslavia), created in 1921 not for Central Europe's cooperation nor to fight German expansion, but in a wrong perceived notion that a completely powerless Hungary must be kept down". The events preceding World War II in Europe, including the so-called Western betrayal such as the Munich Agreement, were very much enabled by the rising nationalism and ethnocentrism that typified that period.

The interwar period brought new elements to the concept of Central Europe. Before World War I, it embraced mainly German-speaking states, and non-German speaking territories were an area of intended German penetration and domination, with German leadership being the 'natural' result of economic dominance. Post-war, the Eastern part of Central Europe was placed at the centre of the concept. At the time, the scientists took an interest in the idea: the International Historical Congress in Brussels in 1923 was committed to Central Europe, and the 1933, Congress continued the discussions.

According to Emmanuel de Martonne, in 1927, Central Europe encompassed Austria, Czechoslovakia, Germany, Hungary, Poland, Romania and Switzerland, northern Italy and northern Yugoslavia. The author uses both Human and Physical Geographical features to define Central Europe but failed to take into account the legal development or the social, cultural, economic, and infrastructural developments in those countries.

The avant-garde movements of Central Europe contributed to the evolution of modernism and reached their its peak throughout the continent during the 1920s. The Sourcebook of Central European avantgards (Los Angeles County Museum of Art) contains primary documents of the avant-gardes in the territories of Austria, Germany, Poland (including western parts of present-day Belarus and Ukraine, and southern parts of Lithuania), Czechoslovakia (including the Czech Republic and Slovakia), Hungary, Romania and Yugoslavia (including present-day Bosnia and Herzegovina, Croatia, Montenegro, North Macedonia, Serbia and Slovenia) from 1910 to 1930.

=== Mitteleuropa ===
With the dissolution of the Holy Roman Empire around 1800, there was a consolidation of power among the Habsburgs and the Hohenzollerns as the two major states in the area. They had much in common and occasionally cooperated in various channels, but more often competed. One approach in the various attempts at cooperation, was the conception of a set of supposed common features and interests, and this idea led to the first discussions of a Mitteleuropa in the mid-nineteenth century, as espoused by Friedrich List and Karl Ludwig Bruck. These were mostly based on economic issues.

Mitteleuropa may refer to a historical concept or a contemporary German definition of Central Europe. As a historical concept, the German term Mitteleuropa (or alternatively its literal translation into English, Middle Europe) is an ambiguous German concept. According to Fritz Fischer Mitteleuropa was a scheme in the era of the Reich of 1871–1918 by which the old imperial elites had allegedly sought to build a system of German economic, military and political domination from the northern seas to the Near East and from the Low Countries through the steppes of Russia to the Caucasus. Later on, Professor Fritz Epstein argued the threat of a Slavic "Drang nach Westen" (Western expansion) had been a major factor in the emergence of a Mitteleuropa ideology before the Reich of 1871 ever came into being.

In Germany, the word's connotation was also sometimes linked to the pre-war German provinces east of the Oder-Neisse line.

The term "Mitteleuropa" conjures up negative historical associations among some people although the Germans have not played an exclusively negative role in the region. Most Central European Jews embraced the enlightened German humanistic culture of the 19th century. Jews at the turn of the 20th century became representatives of what many consider to be Central European culture at its best, but the Nazi conceptualisation of "Mitteleuropa" sought to destroy that culture. The term "Mitteleuropa" is widely used in German education and media without a negative meaning, especially since the end of communism. Many people from the new states of Germany do not identify themselves as being part of Western Europe and therefore prefer the term "Mitteleuropa".

=== Central Europe during World War II ===
German-occupied Europe at the height of the Axis conquests in 1942

During World War II, Central Europe was largely occupied by Nazi Germany. Many areas were a battle area and were devastated. The mass murder of the Jews depopulated many of their centuries-old settlement areas or settled other people there and their culture was wiped out. Both Adolf Hitler and Joseph Stalin diametrically opposed the centuries-old Habsburg principles of "live and let live" with regard to ethnic groups, peoples, minorities, religions, cultures and languages and tried to assert their own ideologies and power interests in Central Europe. There were various Allied plans for state order in Central Europe for post-war. While Stalin tried to get as many states under his control as possible, Winston Churchill preferred a Central European Danube Confederation to counter those countries against Germany and Russia. There were also plans to add Bavaria and Württemberg to an enlarged Austria. There were also various resistance movements around Otto von Habsburg that pursued that goal. The group around the Austrian priest Heinrich Maier also planned in that direction, which also successfully helped the Allies to wage war by, among other things, forwarding production sites and plans for V-2 rockets, Tiger tanks and aircraft to the United States. Otto von Habsburg tried to relieve Austria, Czechoslovakia, Hungary and northern Yugoslavia (particularly the territories of present-day Croatia and Slovenia) from German and Soviet influence and control. There were various considerations to prevent German and Soviet power in Europe after the war. Churchill's idea of reaching the area around Vienna before the Russians via an operation from the Adriatic had not been approved by the Western Allied chiefs of staff. As a result of the military situation at the end of the war, Stalin's plans prevailed and much of Central Europe came under Soviet control.

=== Central Europe behind the Iron Curtain ===
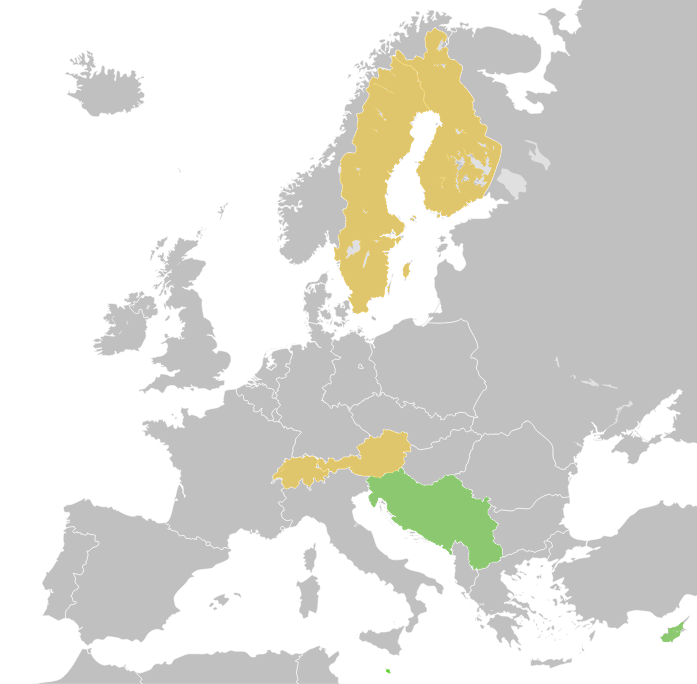
Neutral and Non-Aligned European States during the Cold War: Neutral: Austria, Finland, Sweden, and Switzerland Non-Aligned: Cyprus, Malta, and Yugoslavia

Following World War II, parts of Central Europe became part of the Eastern Bloc. The boundary between the two blocks was called the Iron Curtain. Austria, Switzerland and Yugoslavia remained neutral.

The post-World War II period brought blocking of research on Central Europe in the Eastern Bloc countries, as its every result proved the dissimilarity of Central Europe, which was inconsistent with the Stalinist doctrine. On the other hand, the topic became popular in Western Europe and the United States, much of the research being carried out by immigrants from Central Europe. Following the Fall of Communism, publicists and historians in Central Europe, especially the anti-communist opposition, returned to their research.

According to Karl A. Sinnhuber (Central Europe: Mitteleuropa: Europe Centrale: An Analysis of a Geographical Term) most Central European states were unable to preserve their political independence and became Soviet satellites. Besides Austria, Switzerland and Yugoslavia, only the marginal European states of Cyprus, Finland, Malta and Sweden preserved their political sovereignty to a certain degree, being left out of any military alliances in Europe.

The opening of the Iron Curtain between Austria and Hungary at the Pan-European Picnic on 19 August 1989 then set in motion a peaceful chain reaction, at the end of which there was no longer an East Germany and the Eastern Bloc had disintegrated. It was the largest escape movement from East Germany since the Berlin Wall was built in 1961. After the picnic, which was based on an idea by Otto von Habsburg to test the reaction of the USSR and Mikhail Gorbachev to an opening of the border, tens of thousands of media-informed East Germans set off for Hungary. The leadership of the GDR in East Berlin did not dare to completely block the borders of their own country and the USSR did not respond at all. This broke the bracket of the Eastern Bloc and Central Europe subsequently became free from communism.

=== Roles ===
According to American professor Ronald Tiersky, the 1991 summit held in Visegrád attended by the Czechoslovak, Hungarian and Polish presidents was hailed at the time as a major breakthrough in Central European cooperation, but the Visegrád Group became a vehicle for coordinating Central Europe's road to the European Union, while development of closer ties within the region languished.

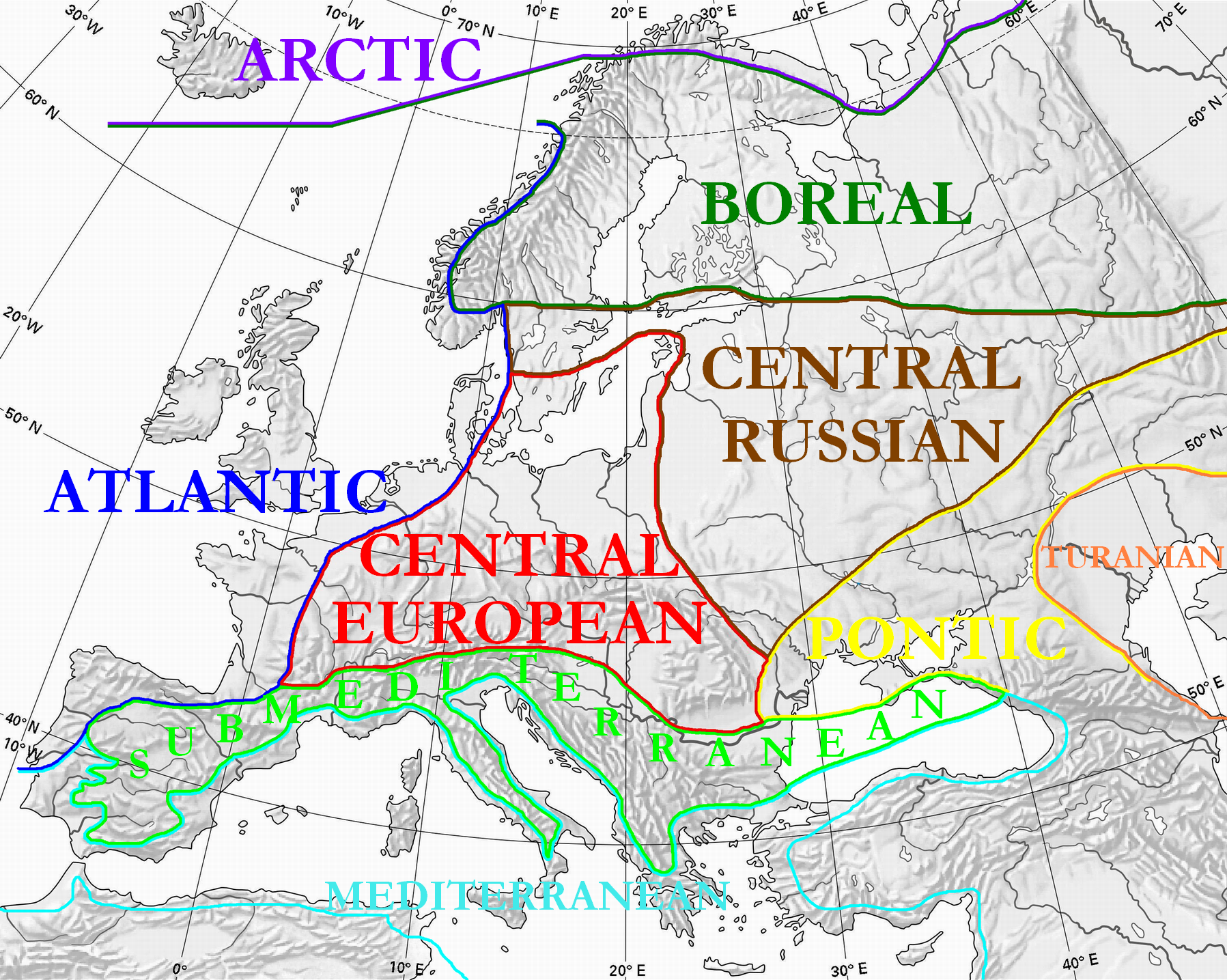
The European floristic regions

American professor Peter J. Katzenstein described Central Europe as a way station in a Europeanization process that marks the transformation process of the Visegrád Group countries in different, though comparable ways. According to him, in Germany's contemporary public discourse "Central European identity" refers to the civilizational divide between Catholicism and Eastern Orthodoxy. He argued that there is no precise way to define Central Europe and that the region may even include Bulgaria, Estonia, Latvia and Serbia.

== Definitions ==
The issue of how to name and define the Central European area is subject to debates. Very often, the definition depends on the nationality and historical perspective of its author. The concept of "Central Europe" appeared in the 19th century. It was understood as a contact zone between the Southern and Northern areas, and later the Eastern and Western areas of Europe. Thinkers portrayed "Central Europe" either as a separate region, or a buffer zone between these regions.

In the early nineteenth century, the terms "Middle" or "Central" Europe (known as "Mitteleuropa" in German and "Europe centrale" in French) were introduced in geographical scholarship in both German and French languages. At first, these terms were linked to the regions spanning from the Pyrenees to the Danube, which, according to German authors, could be united under German authority. However, after the Franco-Prussian war of 1870, the French began to exclude France from this area, and later the Germans also adopted this perspective by the end of World War I.

The concept of "Central" or "Middle Europe", understood as a region with German influence, lost a significant part of its popularity after WWI and was completely dismissed after WWII. Two defeats of Germany in the world wars, combined with the division of Germany, an almost complete disappearance of German-speaking communities in these countries, and the Communist-led isolation of Czechoslovakia, Hungary, Lithuania, Poland and Yugoslavia from the Western world, turned the concept of "Central/Middle Europe" into an anachronism. On the other side, the non-German areas of Central Europe were almost universally regarded as "Eastern European" primarily associated with the Soviet sphere of influence in the late 1940s–1980s.

For the most part, this geographical framework lost its attraction after the end of the Cold War. A number of Post-Communist countries rather re-branded themselves in the 1990s as "Central European.", while avoiding the stained wording of "Middle Europe," which they associated with German influence in the region. This reinvented concept of "Central Europe" excluded Germany, Austria, and Switzerland, reducing its coverage chiefly to Poland, the Czech Republic, Slovakia, Hungary, Lithuania, and Yugoslavia.

=== Academic ===
The main proposed regional definitions, gathered by Polish historian Jerzy Kłoczowski and others, include:

- West-Central and East-Central Europe – this conception, presented in 1950, distinguishes two regions in Central Europe: the German West-Centre and the East-Centre covered by a variety of nations from Finland to Greece, placed between the great empires of Scandinavia, Germany, Italy and the Soviet Union.
- Central Europe as a region comprising countries in mainland Europe speaking West Germanic (Austria, Belgium, Germany, the Netherlands and Switzerland) and West Slavic languages (the Czech Republic, Slovakia and Poland).
- Central Europe as the area of the cultural heritage of the Polish–Lithuanian Commonwealth – Ukrainian, Belarusian and Lithuanian historians, in cooperation (since 1990) with Polish historians, insist on the importance of this concept.

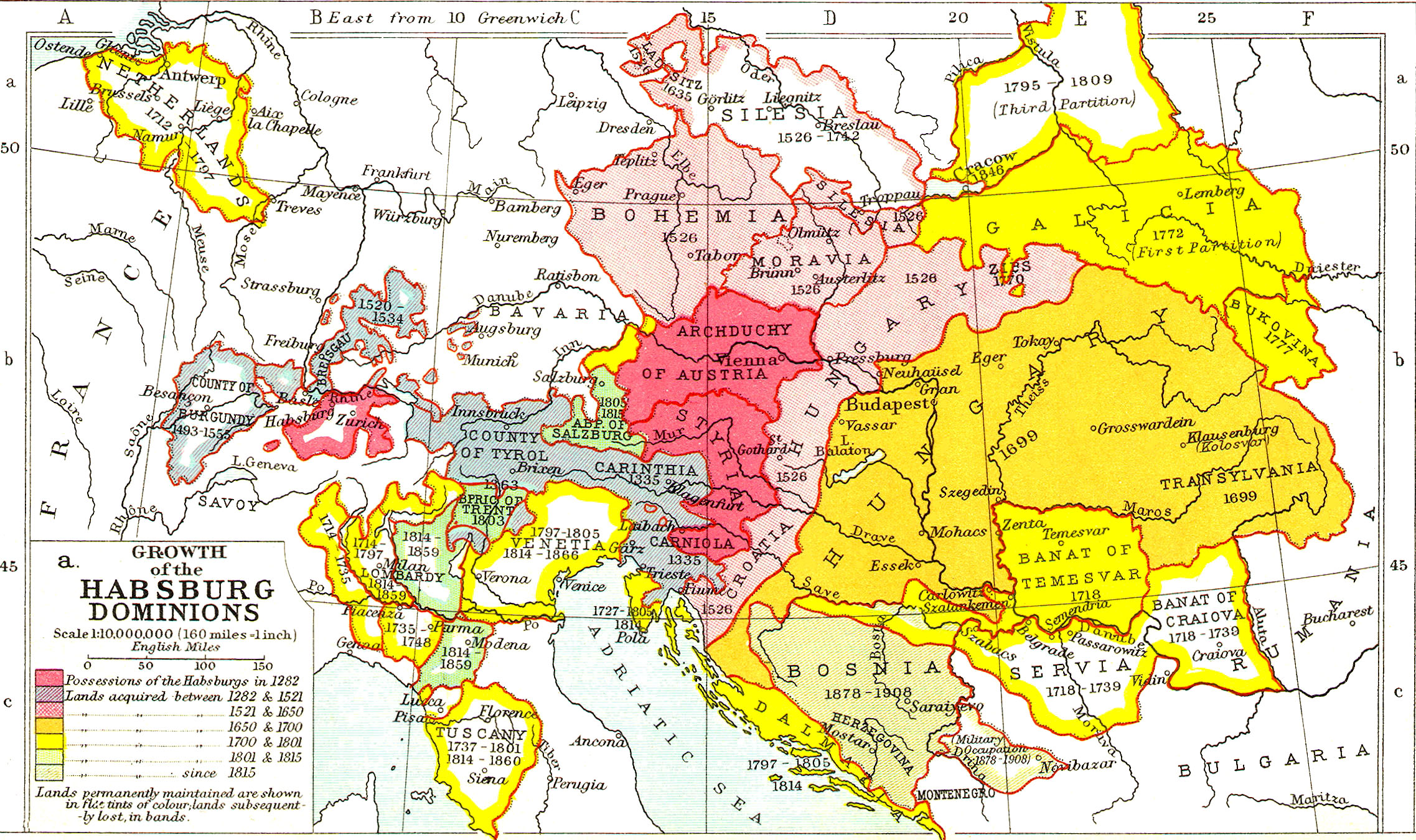
Habsburg-ruled lands (divided between Cisleithanian/Austrian-administered and Transalthanian/Hungarian-administered)

- Central Europe as the area of the former Habsburg monarchy – a concept which is popular in large parts of Bosnia and Herzegovina.
- A concept underlining the links connecting Belarus, Moldova and Ukraine with Russia and treating the Russian Empire together with the whole Slavic Orthodox population as one entity – this position is taken by Russian historiographers.
- A concept putting the accent on links with the West, especially from the 19th century and the grand period of liberation and formation of Nation-states, an idea that is represented by the South-Eastern states, which prefer the enlarged concept of the "East Centre" expressing their links with Western culture.

Former University of Vienna professor Lonnie R. Johnson points out criteria to distinguish Central Europe from Western, Northern, Eastern and Southern Europe:

- One criterion for defining Central Europe is the frontiers of medieval empires and kingdoms that largely correspond to the religious frontiers between Catholic Western and Central Europe and Orthodox Eastern Europe. Following that criterion, the pagans of Central Europe were converted to Catholicism, but in Eastern and Southeastern Europe, they were brought into the fold of the Eastern Orthodox Church.

He also thinks that Central Europe is a dynamic historical concept, not a static spatial one. For example, a fair share of Belarus and Right-bank Ukraine are in Eastern Europe today, but 240 years ago, they were in the Polish–Lithuanian Commonwealth. Johnson's study on Central Europe received acclaim and positive reviews in the scientific community. However, according to the Romanian researcher Maria Bucur, the very ambitious project suffers from the weaknesses imposed by its scope (almost 1600 years of history).

=== Encyclopedias, gazetteers, dictionaries ===
The World Factbook defines Central Europe as: Austria, the Czech Republic, Germany, Hungary, Liechtenstein, Poland, Slovakia, Slovenia, and Switzerland. The Columbia Encyclopedia includes: Austria, the Czech Republic, Germany, Hungary, Latvia, Lithuania, Poland, Slovakia, and Switzerland. While it does not have a single article defining Central Europe, Encyclopædia Britannica includes the following countries in Central Europe in one or more of its articles: Austria, Bosnia and Herzegovina, Croatia, the Czech Republic, Germany, Hungary, Lithuania, Poland, Romania, Slovakia, Slovenia and Switzerland.

The French Encyclopédie Larousse defines Central Europe as a region comprising Austria, the Czech Republic, Germany, Liechtenstein, Slovakia, Slovenia, and Switzerland.

The German Encyclopaedia Meyers Grosses Taschenlexikon (Meyers Big Pocket Encyclopedia), 1999, defines Central Europe as the central part of Europe with no precise borders to the East and West. The term is mostly used to denominate the territory between the Schelde to Vistula and from the Danube to the Moravian Gate.

The German Ständige Ausschuss für geographische Namen (Standing Committee on Geographical Names), which develops and recommends rules for the uniform use of geographical names, proposes two sets of boundaries. The first follows international borders of current countries. The second subdivides and includes some countries based on cultural criteria. In comparison to some other definitions, it is broader, including Luxembourg, Estonia, Latvia, and in the second sense, the Kaliningrad Oblast and parts of Belarus, Ukraine, Romania, Serbia, Italy, and France.

According to Meyers Enzyklopädisches Lexikon, Central Europe is a part of Europe composed of Austria, Belgium, the Czech Republic, Slovakia, Germany, Hungary, Luxembourg, Netherlands, Poland, Romania and Switzerland, and northern marginal regions of Italy and Yugoslavia (northern states – Croatia and Slovenia), as well as northeastern France.

=== Geographical ===
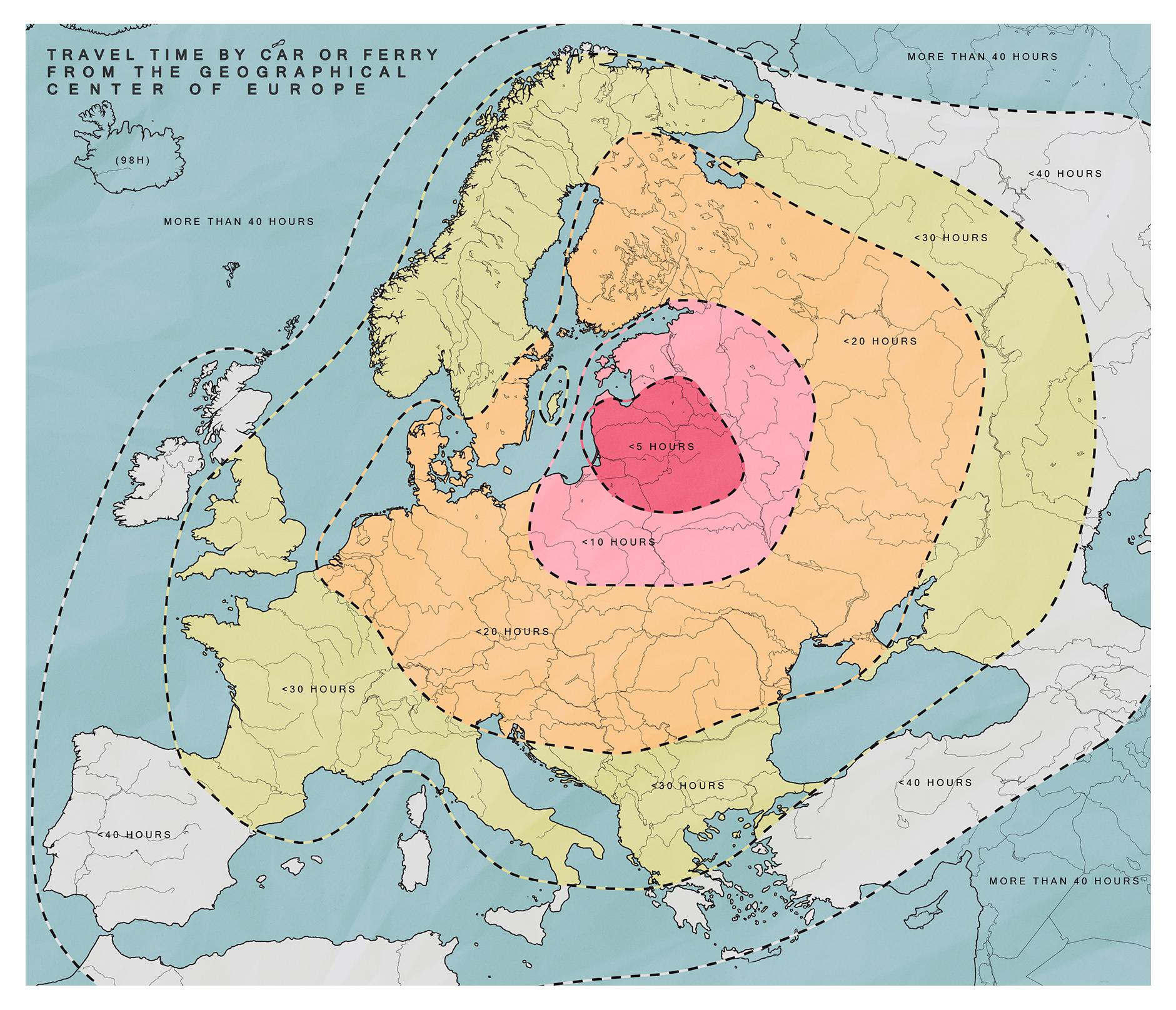
Travel time by car or ferry from a proposed geographical center of Europe

There is no general agreement either on what geographic area constitutes Central Europe, nor on how to further subdivide it geographically.

At times, the term "Central Europe" denotes a geographic definition as the Danube region in the heart of the continent, including the language and culture areas which are today included in the states of Austria, Bosnia and Herzegovina, Bulgaria, Croatia, the Czech Republic, Hungary, Moldova, Poland, Romania, Serbia, Slovakia, Slovenia, Ukraine, and usually also Germany.

=== Governmental and standards organisations ===
The terminology EU11 countries refers the Central, Eastern, and Baltic European member states which accessed in 2004 and after: in 2004 Czech Republic, Estonia, Latvia, Lithuania, Hungary, Poland, Slovenia, and Slovakia; in 2007 Bulgaria, Romania; and in 2013 Croatia.

The EU-funded Interreg region "Central Europe" includes the following countries and regions:

- Ukraine
- Poland
- Lithuania
- Latvia
- Estonia
- Czech Republic
- United Kingdom
- Netherlands
- Denmark

Countries:

Countries in the Central European Free Trade Agreement (CEFTA)

The Central European Free Trade Agreement includes the following countries:

- Albania
- Bosnia and Herzegovina
- Kosovo
- Moldova
- Montenegro
- North Macedonia
- Serbia

=== Map gallery ===
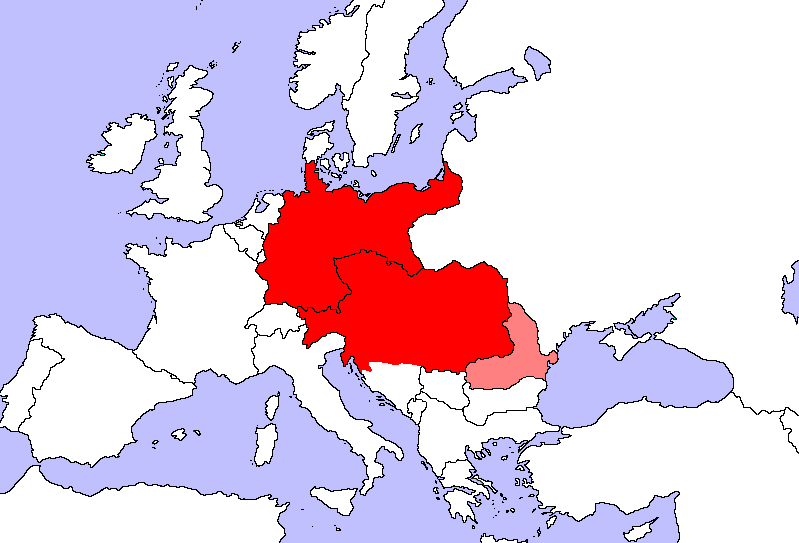
A view of Central Europe dating from the time before World War I (1902):
Central European countries and regions: the German Empire and the Habsburg monarchy (without Bosnia and Herzegovina and Dalmatia)
Regions located at the transition between Central Europe and Southeastern/Eastern Europe: Romania

Interwar Central Europe according to Emmanuel de Martonne (1927)

Central Europe, according to Sourcebook of Central European Avant-Gardes 1910–1930 (L.A. County Museum of Art)

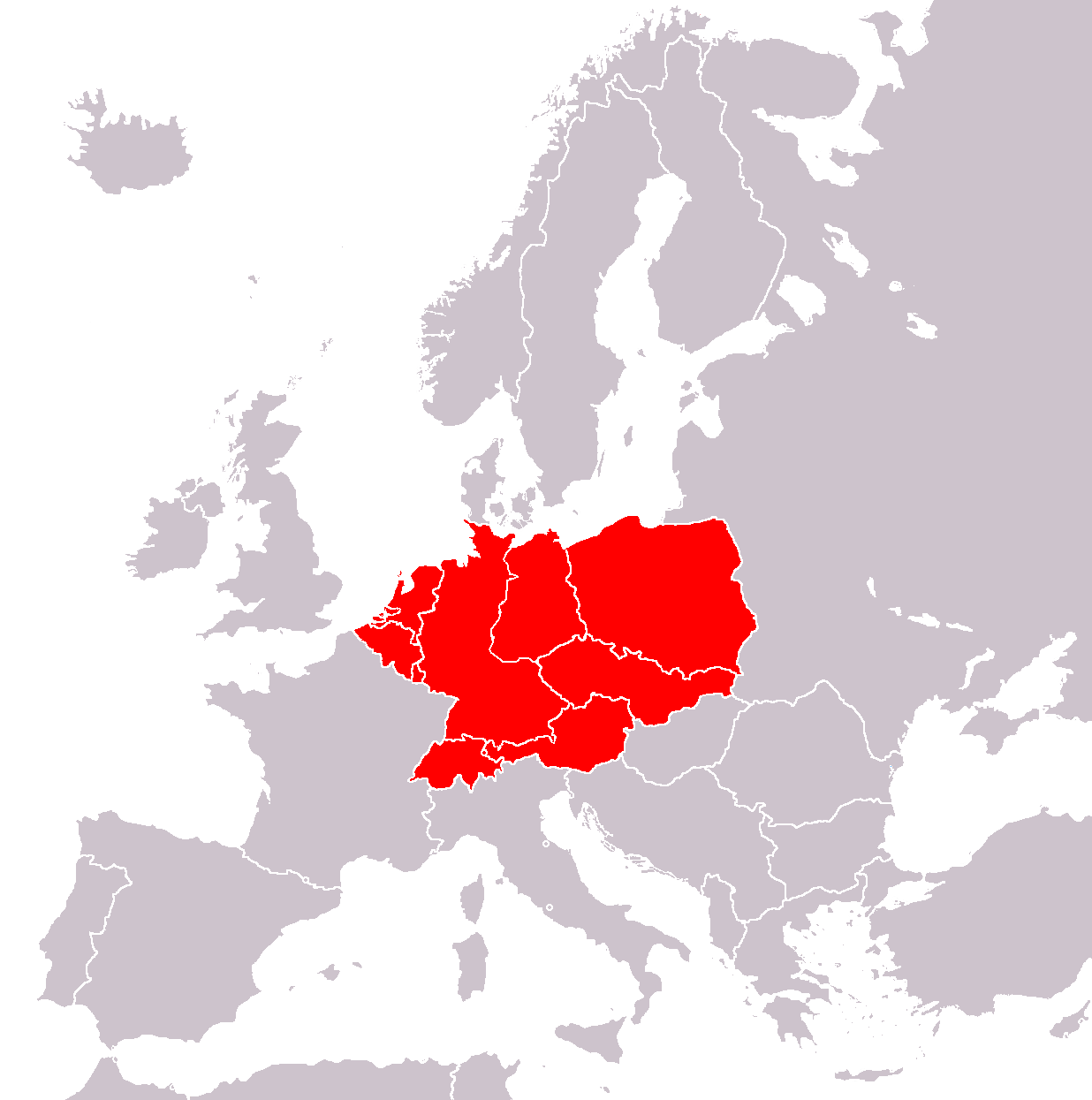
Central Europe, as defined by E. Schenk (1950)

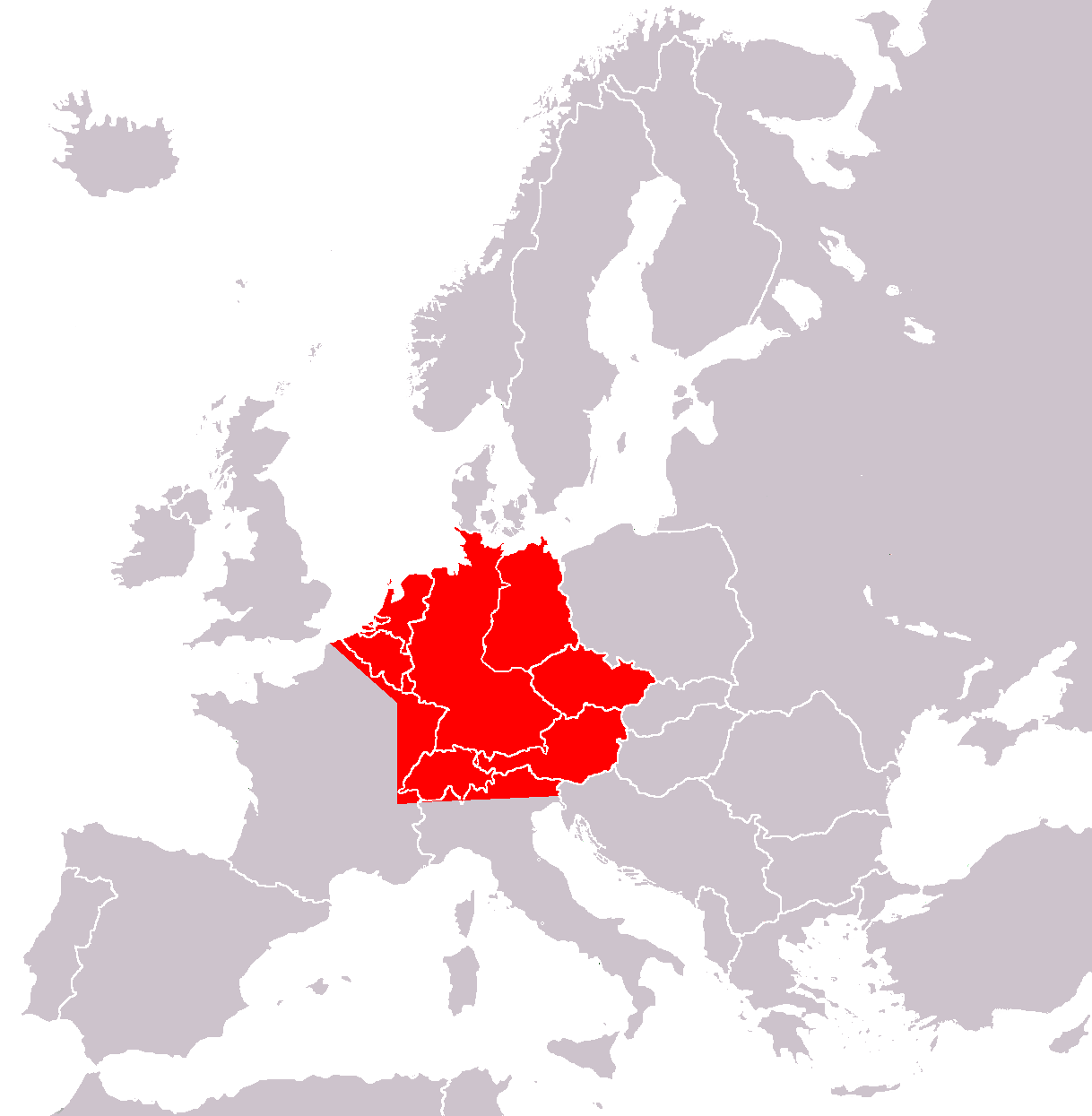
Central Europe, according to Alice F. A. Mutton in Central Europe. A Regional and Human Geography (1961)

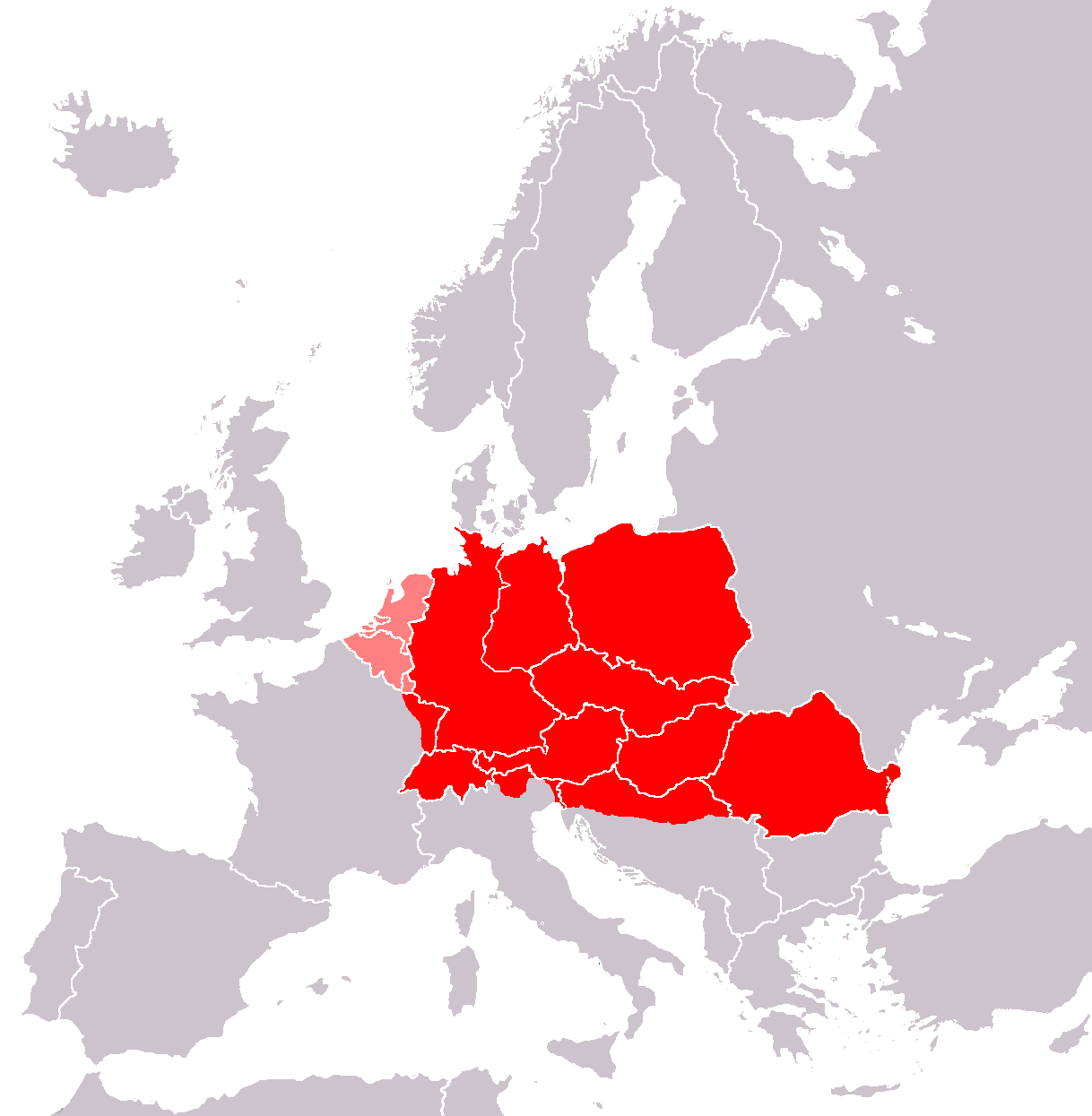
Central Europe according to Meyers Enzyklopaedisches Lexikon (1980)

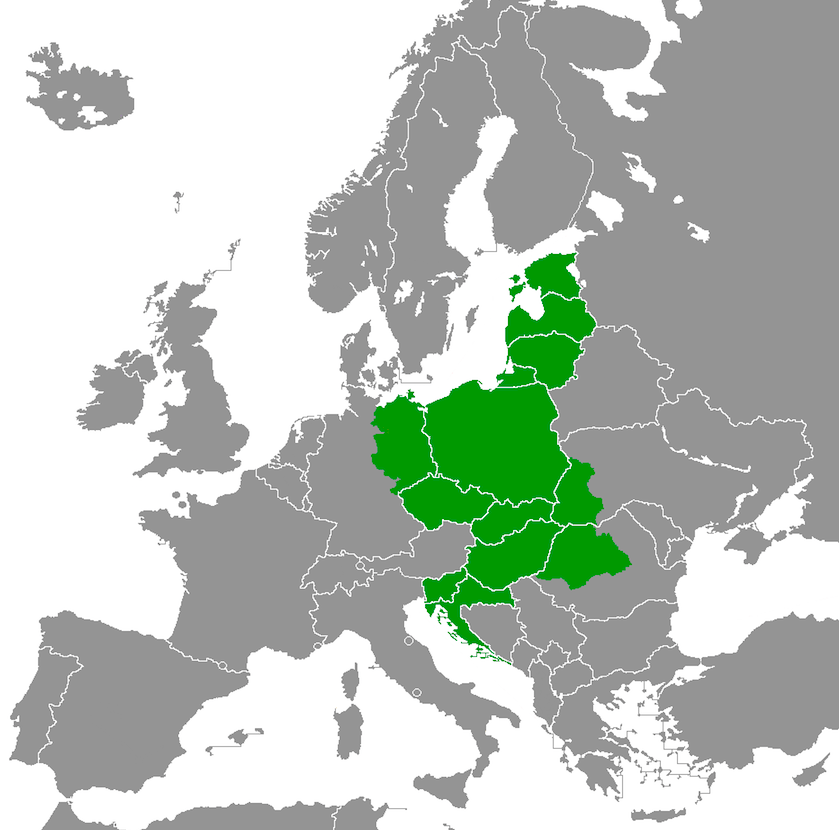
Central Europe, as defined by Czesław Miłosz (1983)

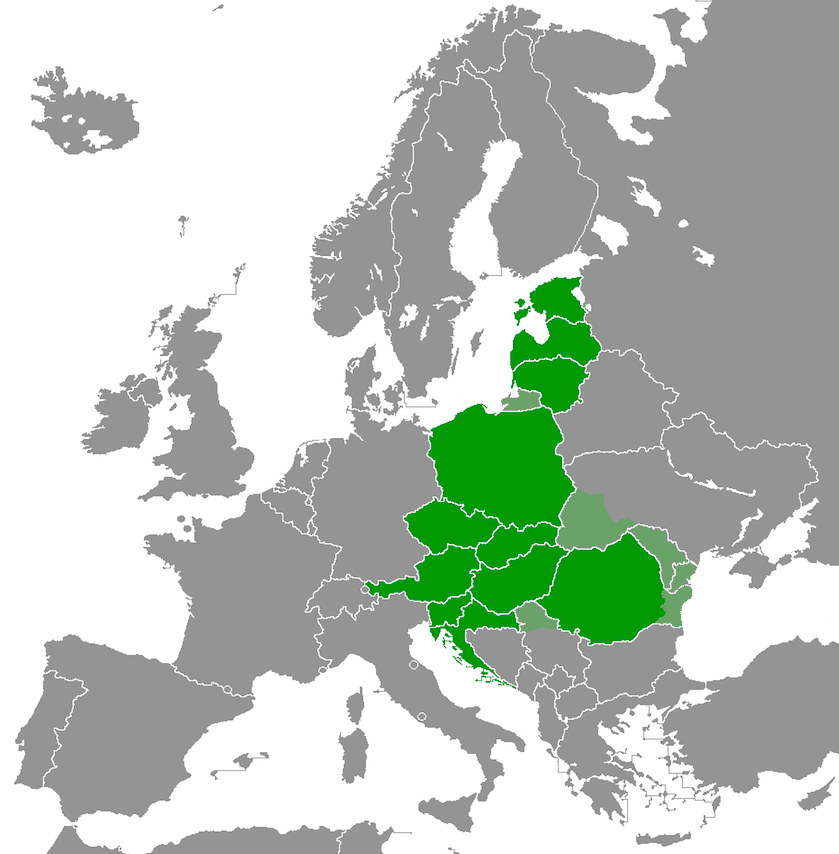
Central Europe, as defined by Georges Castellan (1994)

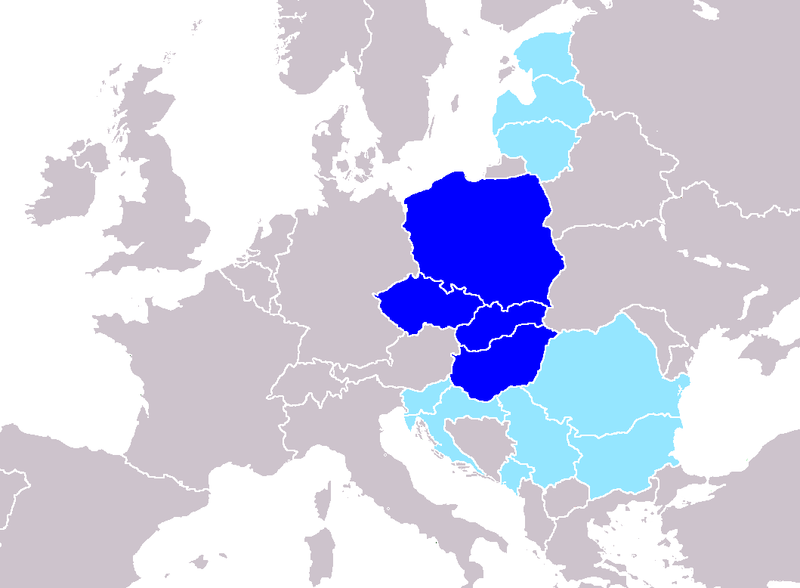
Central Europe according to Peter J. Katzenstein (1997):
The Visegrád Group countries are referred to as Central Europe in the book.
Countries for which there is no precise, uncontestable way to decide whether they are parts of Central Europe or not

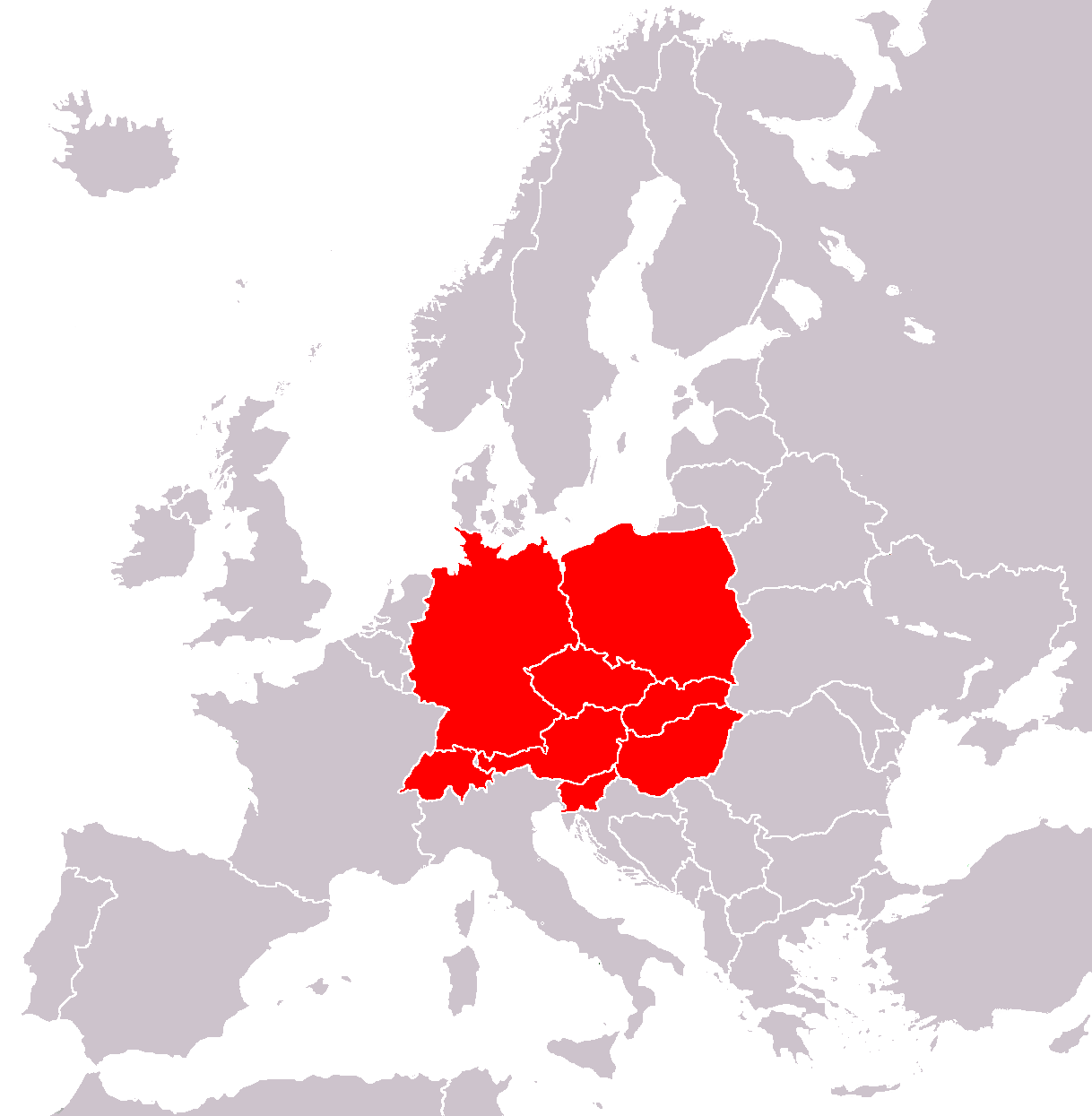
Middle Europe (Brockhaus Enzyklopädie, 1998)

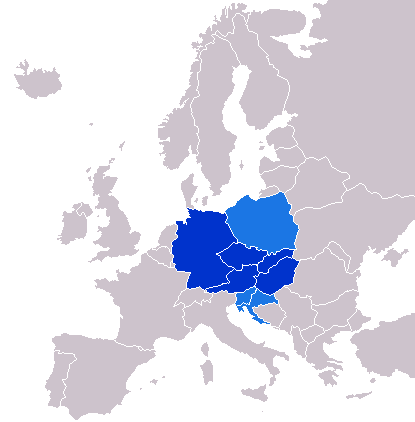
Central Europe according to Swansea University professors Robert Bideleux and Ian Jeffries (1998)

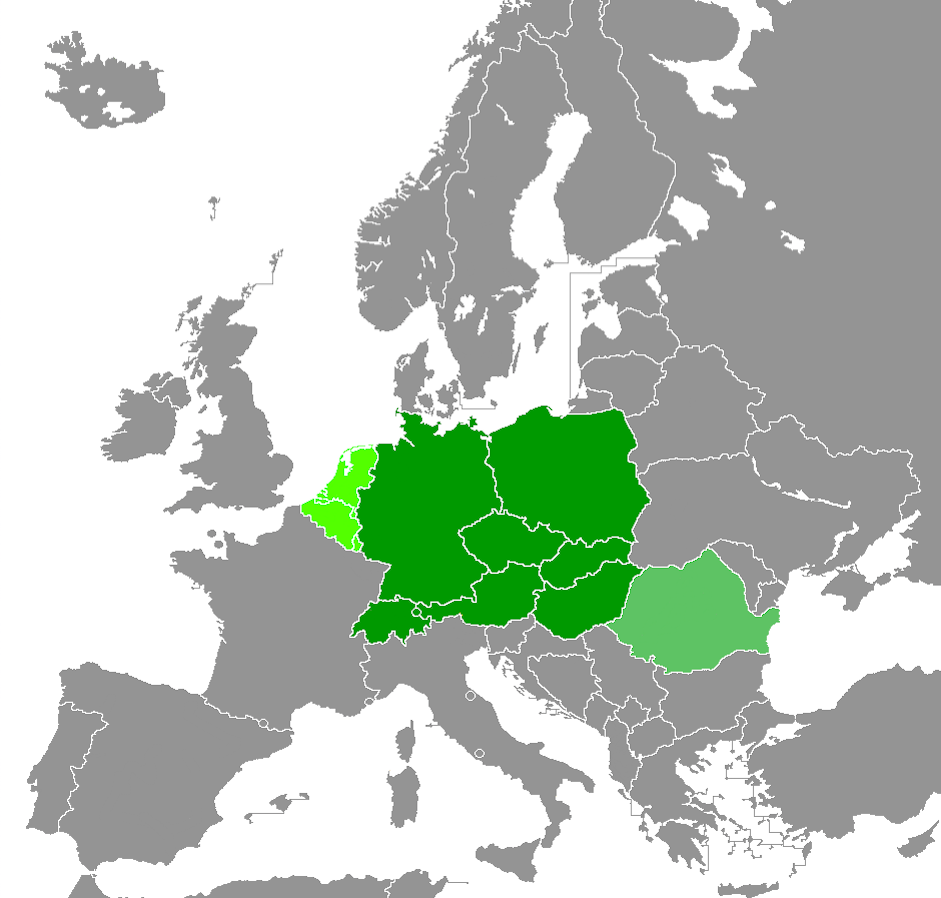
The Central European Countries according to Meyers Grosses Taschenlexikon (1999):
Countries usually considered Central European
Central European countries in the broader sense of the term
Countries occasionally considered to be Central European

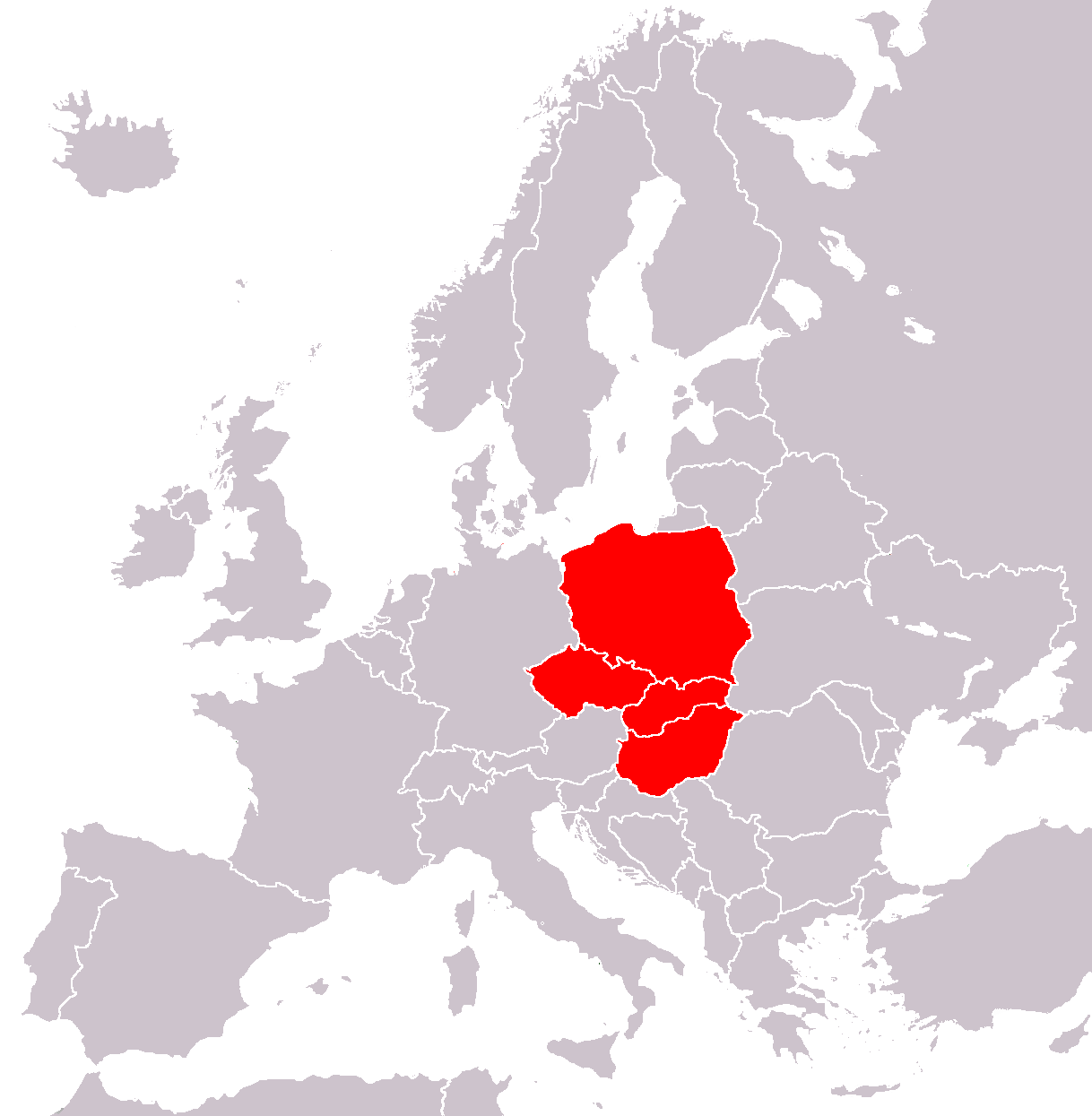
According to The Economist and Ronald Tiersky (2005), a strict definition of Central Europe means the Visegrád Group.

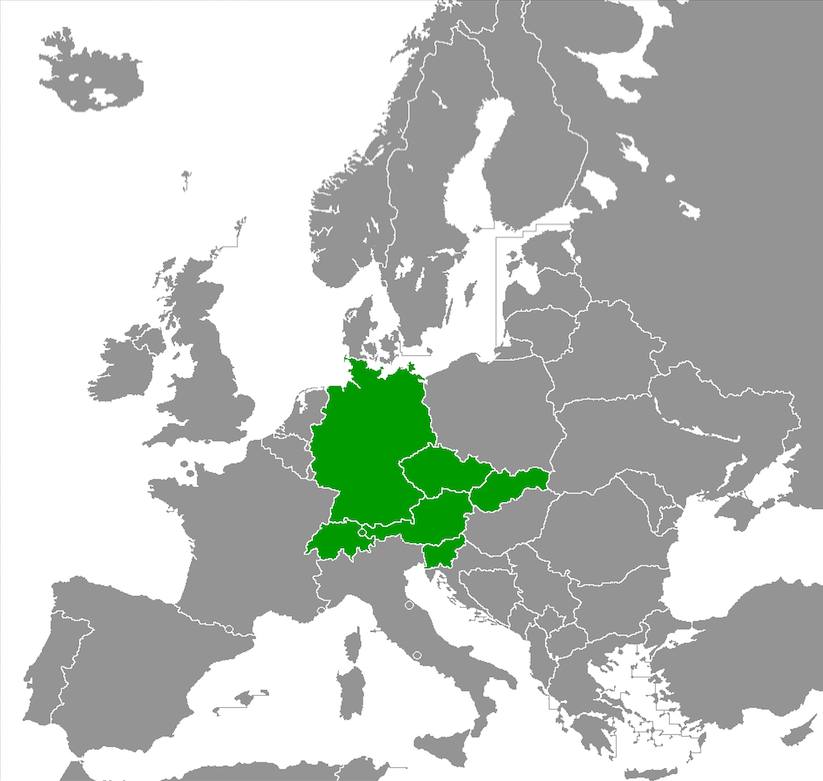
Central Europe, as defined in the French Encylopédie Larousse (2009)

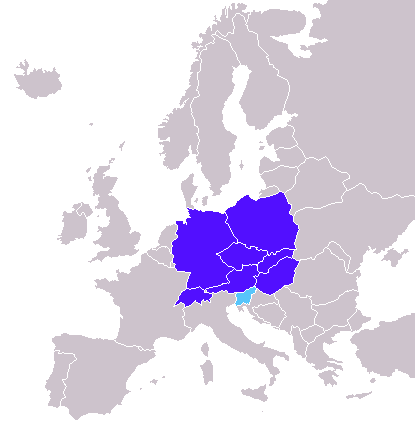
Central European countries in Encarta Encyclopedia (2009):
Central European countries
Slovenia in "south central Europe"

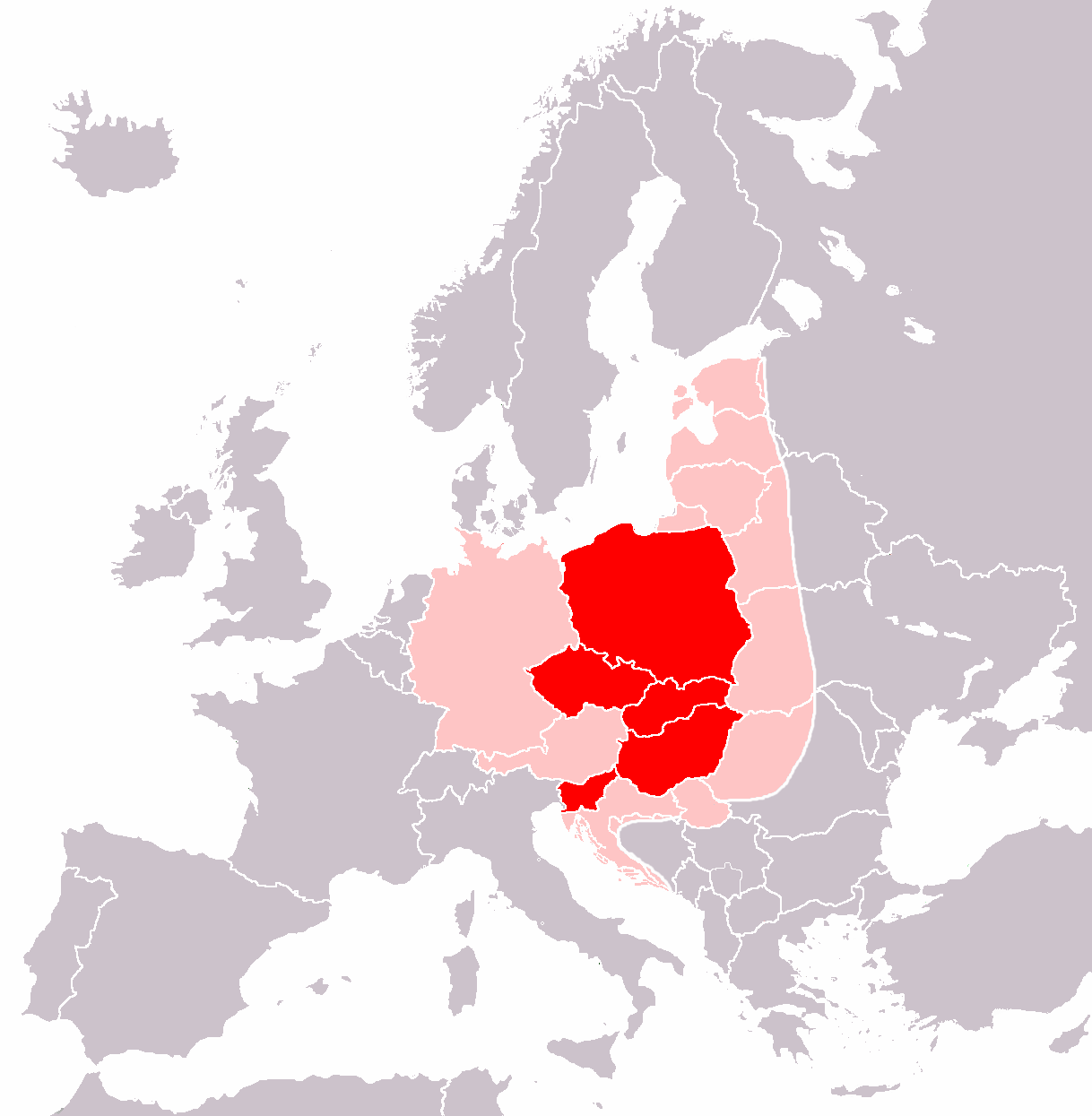
Map of Central Europe, according to Lonnie R. Johnson (2011):
Countries usually considered Central European (citing the World Bank and the OECD)
Countries considered to be Central European only in the broader sense of the term

== States ==
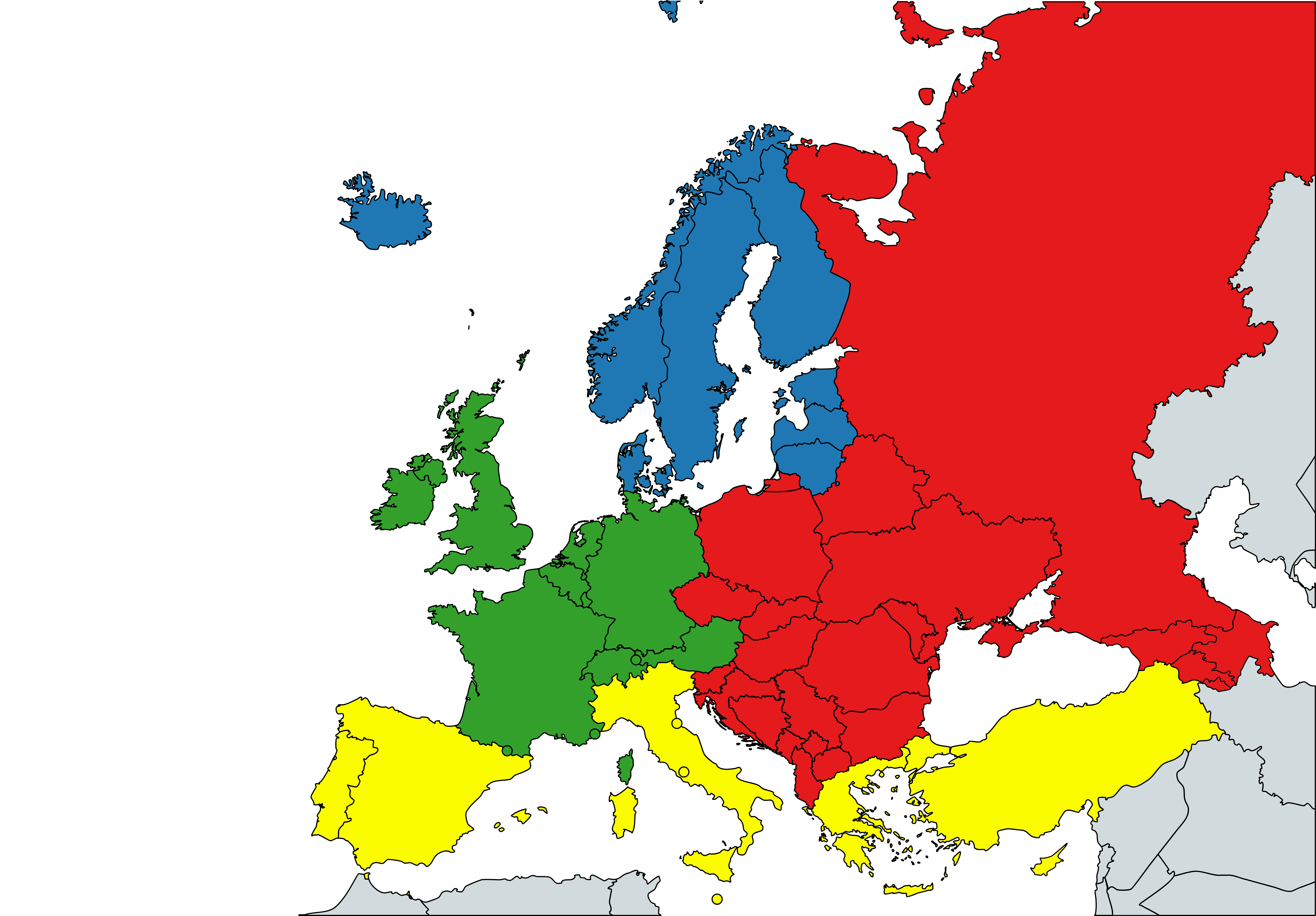
European sub-regions according to EuroVoc Central and Eastern Europe Western Europe Southern Europe Northern Europe

The choice of states that make up Central Europe is an ongoing source of controversy. Although views on which countries belong to Central Europe are vastly varied, according to many sources (see section Definitions) the region includes some or all of the states listed in the sections below:

- Austria
- Croatia
- Czech Republic
- Germany
- Hungary
- Liechtenstein
- Lithuania
- Poland
- Slovakia
- Slovenia
- Switzerland

Depending on the context, Central European countries are sometimes not seen as a specific group, but sorted as either Eastern or Western European countries. In this case Austria, Germany, Liechtenstein and Switzerland are often placed in Western Europe, while Croatia, the Czech Republic, Hungary, Lithuania, Poland, Slovakia and Slovenia are placed in Eastern Europe.

Croatia is alternatively placed in Southeastern Europe. Additionally, Hungary and Slovenia are sometimes included in the region.

Lithuania is alternatively placed in Northeastern Europe.

Regions used for statistical processing purposes by the United Nations Statistics Division Eastern Europe Northern Europe Southern Europe Western Europe

=== Other countries and regions ===
Some sources also add regions of neighbouring countries for historical reasons, or based on geographical and/or cultural reasons:

- Bosnia and Herzegovina (as a former part of the Habsburg monarchy and Yugoslavia, alternatively placed in Southern or Southeast Europe)
- Italy (South Tyrol, Trentino, Trieste and Gorizia, Friuli, Lombardy, and Veneto or all of Northern Italy)
- Romania (Transylvania, along with Banat, Crișana, Maramureș, Bukovina.)
- Serbia (primarily Vojvodina and Northern Belgrade, alternatively placed in Southeast Europe)
- Ukraine (Donechchyna, Odeshchyna, Transcarpathia, Galicia and Volhynia)

== Geography ==
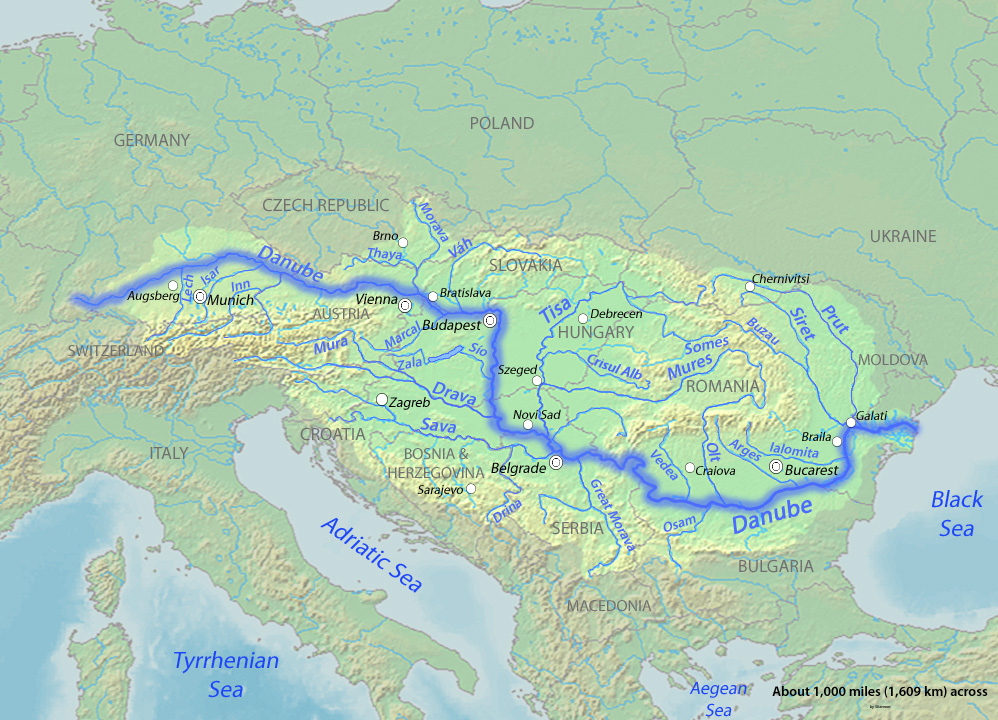
The Danube watercourse system throughout Central and Southeastern Europe

Geography defines Central Europe's natural borders with the neighbouring regions to the north across the Baltic Sea, namely Northern Europe (or Scandinavia), and to the south across the Alps, the Apennine Peninsula (or Italy), and the Balkan Peninsula across the Soča–Krka–Sava–Danube line. The borders to Western Europe and Eastern Europe are geographically less defined, and for this reason the cultural and historical boundaries migrate more easily west–east than south–north.

Southwards, the Pannonian Plain is bounded by the rivers Sava and Danube – and their respective floodplains. The Pannonian Plain stretches over the following countries: Austria, Croatia, Hungary, Romania, Serbia, Slovakia and Slovenia, and touches borders of Bosnia and Herzegovina and Ukraine ("peri- Pannonian states").

South of the Eastern Alps (spanning Austria, Germany, Italy, Liechtenstein, Slovenia and Switzerland), the Dinaric Alps extend for 650 kilometres along the coast of the Adriatic Sea (northwest-southeast), from the Julian Alps in the northwest down to the Šar-Korab massif, north–south. According to the Freie Universität Berlin, this mountain chain is classified as South Central European. The city of Trieste in this area, for example, expressly sees itself as a città mitteleuropea. This is particularly because it lies at the interface between the Latin, Slavic, Germanic, Greek and Jewish culture on the one hand and the geographical area of the Mediterranean and the Alps on the other. A geographical and cultural assignment is made.

The Central European flora region stretches from Central France (the Massif Central) to the Northern Balkans, Central Romania (Carpathians) and Southern Scandinavia.

== Demography ==
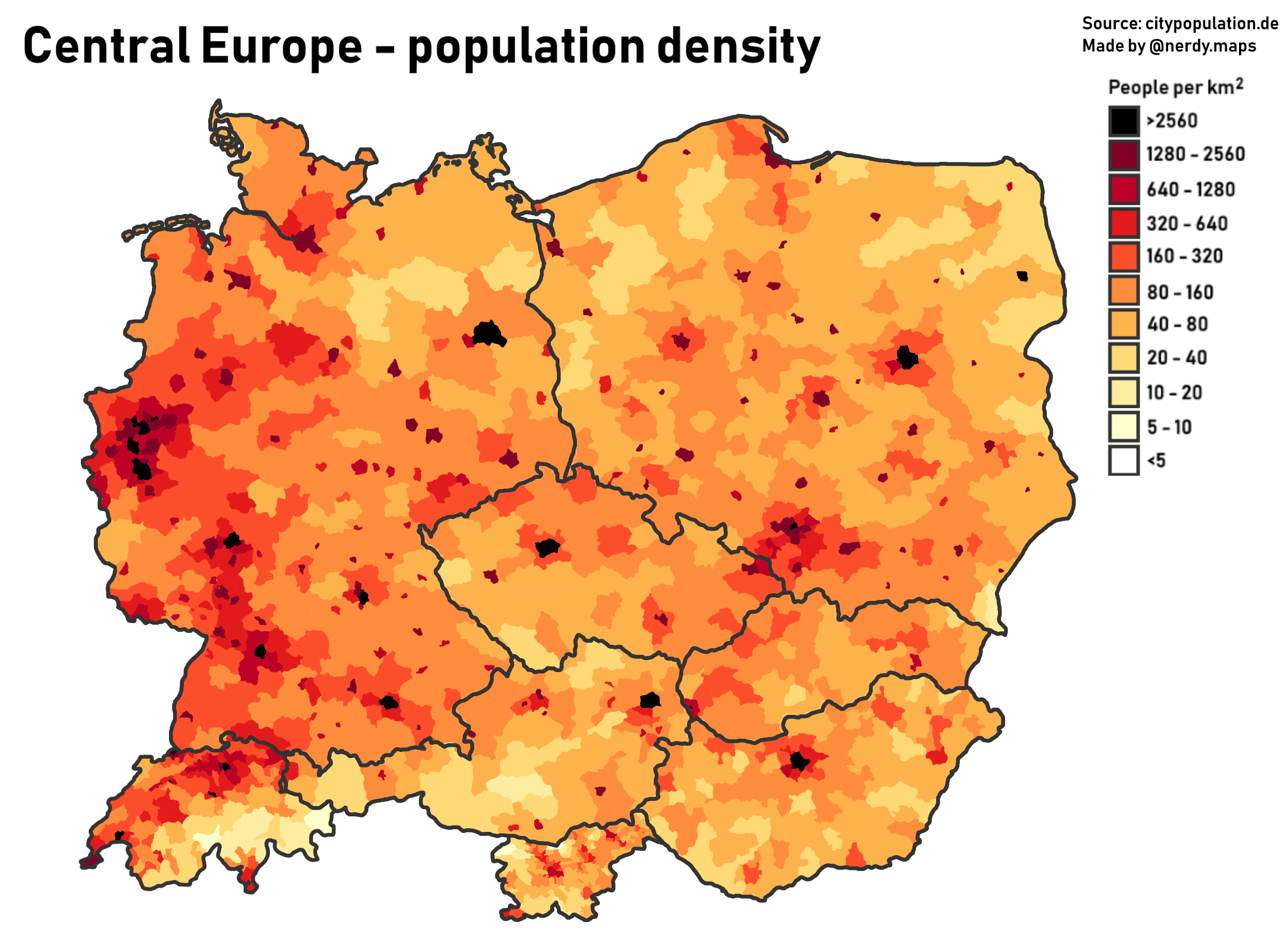
Population density in Central European countries

Population density (people per km^{2}) by country

Central Europe is one of the continent's most populous regions. It includes countries of varied sizes, ranging from tiny Liechtenstein to Germany, the second largest European country by population. Demographic figures for countries entirely located within notion of Central Europe ("the core countries") number around 173 million people, out of which around 82 million are residents of Germany. Other populations include: Poland with around 38.5 million residents, Czech Republic at 10.5 million, Hungary at 10 million, Austria with 9.2 million, Switzerland with 8.5 million, Slovakia at 5.4 million, Croatia with 4.3 million, Lithuania with 2.9 million, Slovenia with 2.1 million and Liechtenstein at a bit less than 40,000.

If the countries which are sometimes also included in Central Europe were counted in, partially or in whole – Romania (20 million), Latvia (2 million), Estonia (1.3 million), Serbia (7.1 million) – this would contribute around an additional 30.4 million, although this figure would vary depending on whether a regional or integral approach is used. If smaller, western and eastern historical parts of Central Europe would be included in the demographic corpus, a further 20 million people of different nationalities would also be added in the overall count, surpassing a total of 200 million people.

== Economy ==
Germany is Central Europe’s largest economy. Poland is another major market and manufacturing centre. Services generate most of the region’s economic output. In 2025, industry excluding construction accounted for around 23–26% of gross value added in Czechia, Germany, Slovakia and Slovenia, compared with the EU average of 19%.

The formerly socialist economies underwent market reforms and privatisation in the early 1990s. Integration with the EU later encouraged investment and growth. Early gains after the 2004 enlargement in the new member states came mainly from industry, with services contributing more in following years.

=== Industry ===
Factories across Central Europe produce vehicles, machinery and electrical equipment, as well as metal products, chemicals, medicines, and processed food.

Germany produces more vehicles than any other country in Central Europe. Slovakia and Czechia are among the world’s largest car producers per head of population. Hungary and Slovenia also assemble vehicles. Poland manufactures commercial vehicles and automotive components, while Austrian firms combine vehicle and component production with engineering and testing services. Volkswagen Group, which owns the Czech carmaker Škoda Auto, operates vehicle plants across the region.

Component manufacturers supply vehicle plants across the region with engines, transmissions, tyres and electronic systems. Poland, Hungary and Germany also manufacture battery cells for electric vehicles. Engineering centres develop components and software and carry out testing. Valeo’s Prague centre, for example, works on driver-assistance systems and thermal management for electric vehicles.

German firms make machinery and equipment for many industries. Czechia produces machinery and electrical equipment as well as specialised instruments, such as the electron microscopes made in Brno. Germany and Austria also manufacture semiconductors and other electronic components.

Pharmaceuticals and precision instruments are prominent Swiss exports. Swiss pharmaceutical companies also manufacture elsewhere in the region, such as Novartis and its production facilities in Slovenia.

Hungary’s Gedeon Richter and Slovenia’s Krka develop medicines and operate plants in several countries.

=== Services ===
Services account for roughly two-thirds to three-quarters of gross value added in the region’s economies. They cover trade, transport, finance, real estate and business services, as well as public administration, education, health, and social care.

Transport and distribution services link factories with customers across borders. Software development and IT services are established in Germany, Czechia, and Poland. Germany's SAP develops software for managing business operations. The Polish group Asseco supplies enterprise software for banks and public institutions.

Austria's Erste Group operates banks in several Central European countries. Switzerland is an international centre for banking, asset management, insurance and reinsurance, with cross-border asset management a major activity.

=== Trade and investment ===
Germany is the main export market for several neighbouring economies. In 2025, it took about 32% of Czech goods exports, 29% of Austrian exports, 27% of Polish exports and 25% of Hungarian exports. Some components delivered to German factories are used in goods exported elsewhere in Europe and overseas.

Poland’s ORLEN runs refineries in Poland, Czechia and Lithuania, while Hungary’s MOL has refining and petrochemical operations in Hungary, Slovakia and Croatia. The Czech energy group EPH owns stakes in power plants, gas networks, storage facilities and district heating systems across Europe. It holds a controlling stake in Slovenské elektrárne.

PPF, a Czech investment group, owns CME, which runs television stations in Czechia, Slovakia, Slovenia and Croatia. It also has stakes in telecoms operators and infrastructure providers in Czechia, Slovakia and Hungary.

=== Agriculture ===
Central European countries are some of the most significant food producers in the world. Germany is the world's largest hops producer with 34.27% share in 2010, Slovenia is one of the world's leading producers of honey. Serbia is the world's 2nd largest producer of plums and 2nd largest producer of raspberries.

=== Tourism ===
Central European countries, especially Austria, the Czech Republic, Germany, and Switzerland are some of the most competitive tourism destinations.

=== Currencies ===
Currently, the members of the Eurozone include Austria, Croatia, Germany, Lithuania, Slovakia, and Slovenia. The Czech Republic, Hungary, and Poland use their own currencies (koruna, forint, Polish złoty, respectively), but are obliged to adopt the Euro. Switzerland uses its own currency (Swiss franc), as does Serbia (dinar) and Romania (Romanian leu).

== Transport ==
=== Rail ===
Rail network density

Central Europe contains the continent's earliest railway systems, whose greatest expansion was recorded in Austrian, Czech, German, Hungarian and Swiss territories between 1860-1870s. By the mid-19th century Berlin, Vienna, Zurich, Pest, and Prague were focal points for network lines connecting industrial areas of Saxony, Silesia, Bohemia, Moravia, and Lower Austria with the Baltic (Kiel, Szczecin) and Adriatic (Rijeka, Trieste). By 1913, the combined length of the railway tracks of Austria and Hungary reached 43,280 kilometres (26,890 miles). By 1936, 70% of the Swiss Federal Railway network had undergone electrification.

Rail infrastructure in Central Europe remains the densest in the world. Railway density as of 2022, with total length of lines operated (km) per 1,000 km2, from highest to lowest is Switzerland (129.2), the Czech Republic (120.7), Germany (108.8), Hungary (85.0), Slovakia (74.0), Austria (66.5), Poland (61.9), Slovenia (59.6), Serbia (49.2), Croatia (46.3), and Lithuania (29.4).

=== River transport and canals ===
Before the first railroads appeared in the 1840s, river transport constituted the main means of communication and trade. Earliest canals included Plauen Canal (1745), Finow Canal, and also Bega Canal (1710) which connected Timișoara to Novi Sad and Belgrade via the Danube. The most significant achievement in this regard was the facilitation of navigability on the Danube from the Black Sea to Ulm in the 19th century.

The economies of Central Europe tend to demonstrate high complexity. Industrialisation reached Central Europe relatively early beginning with Germany and the Czech lands near the end of the 18th century.

The industrialization of the cities of Romania and Serbia started in the interwar period, and did not make significant progress until the post-WWII era.

== Education ==
=== Education performance ===
Student performance has varied across Central Europe, according to the Programme for International Student Assessment. In the 2012 study, countries scored medium, below or over the average scores in three fields studied.

=== Higher education ===
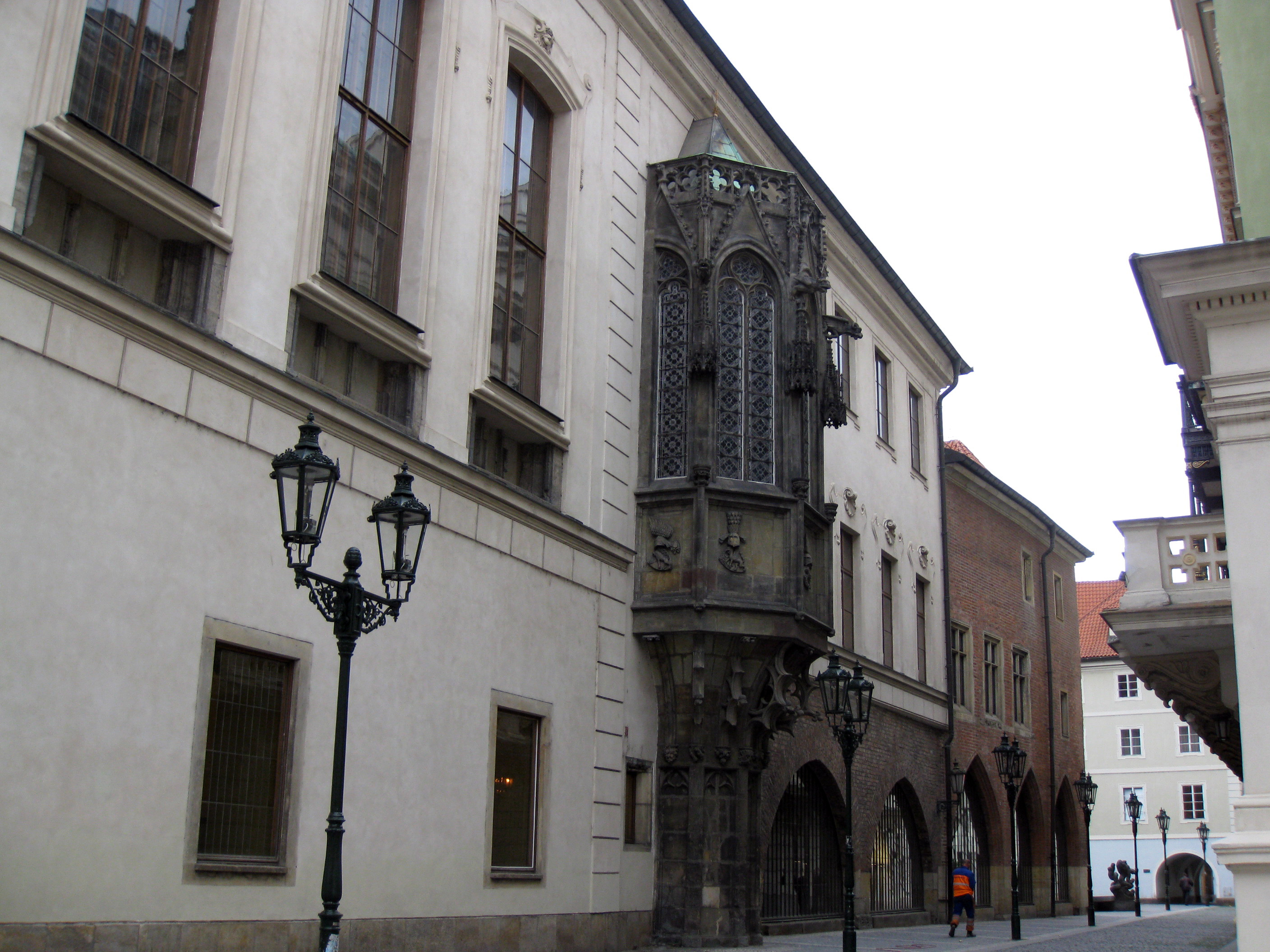
Karolinum of the Charles University in Prague

==== Universities ====
The first university established east of France and north of the Alps was in Prague in 1348 by Charles IV, Holy Roman Emperor. The Charles University was modeled upon the University of Paris and initially included the faculty of law, medicine, philosophy, and theology.

==== Central European University ====
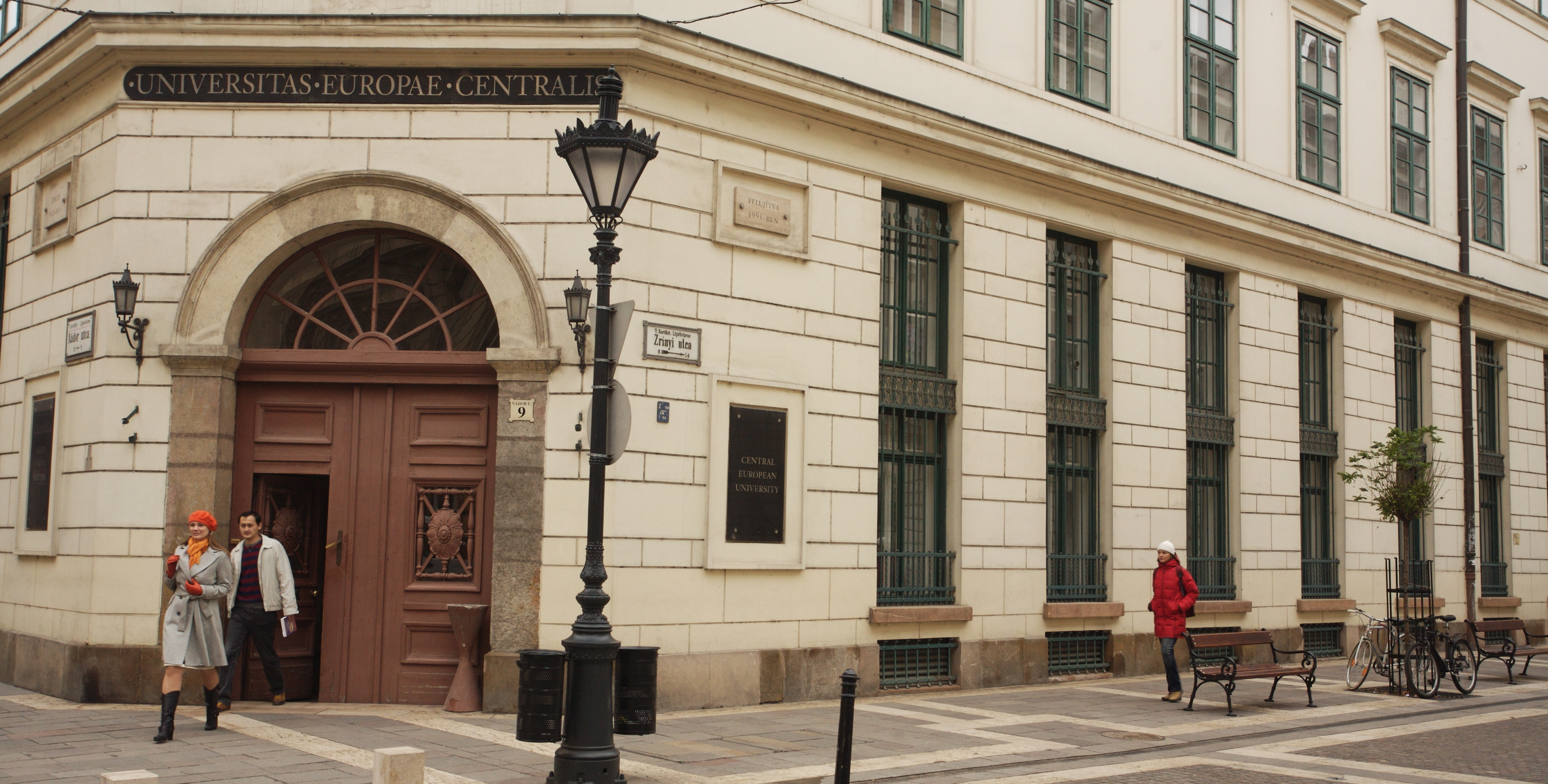
The entrance of the Central European University in Budapest

In 1991, Ernest Gellner proposed the establishment of a Central European institution of higher learning in Prague (1991–1995). Eventually, the Central European University (CEU) project was taken on and financially supported by the philanthropist George Soros, who provided an endowment of US$880 million, making the university one of the wealthiest in Europe. Over its 30-year history, CEU has become one of the most internationally diverse universities in the world. As of 2019, 1217 students were enrolled in the university, of which 962 were international students, making the student body the fourth most international in the world. CEU offers highly selective programs with a student-to-faculty ratio of 7:1. In 2021, the admission rate into its programs was 13%. CEU promotes a distinctively Central European perspective while emphasizing academic rigor, applied research, and academic integrity. CEU is a founding member of CIVICCA, a group of prestigious European higher education institutions in the social sciences, humanities, business management and public policy, including Sciences Po (France), The London School of Economics and Political Science (UK), Bocconi University (Italy) and the Stockholm School of Economics (Sweden).

== Culture and society ==
=== Religion ===
Adherence to Catholicism in Europe

Adherence to Protestantism in Europe

Central European major Christian denomination is Catholicism as well as large Protestant populations. Click map to see legend.

Central European countries are mostly Catholic (Austria, Croatia, Liechtenstein, Lithuania, Poland and Slovenia) or historically both Catholic and Protestant (the Czech Republic, Germany, Hungary, Slovakia and Switzerland). Large Protestant groups include Lutheran, Calvinist, and the Unity of the Brethren affiliates. Significant populations of Eastern Catholicism and Old Catholicism are also prevalent throughout Central Europe. Orthodox Christianity is a minority denomination observed to varying extents across Central Europe.

Central Europe has been the center of the Protestant movement for centuries, with the majority of Protestants suppressed and annihilated during the Counterreformation.

Historically, people in Bohemia in today's Czech Republic were some of the first Protestants in Europe. As a result of the Thirty Years' War following the Bohemian Revolt, many Czechs were either killed, executed (see for Old Town Square execution), forcibly turned into Roman Catholics, or emigrated to Scandinavia and the Low Countries. In the aftermath of the Thirty Years' War, the number of inhabitants in the Kingdom of Bohemia decreased from three million to only 800,000 from multiple factors, including devastating ongoing battles such as the significant Battle of White Mountain and the Battle of Prague (1648). However, in recent years, most Czechs report as overwhelmingly non-religious, with some describing themselves as Catholic (10.3%).

Islam has had a notable historical presence in Croatia and Hungary. Islam in Hungary dates back to the foundation of the state, from which a significant Muslim community persisted for several centuries. Islam was revived there under Ottoman rule. Islam in Croatia dates back to Ottoman rule, and today is represented mainly by ethnic Bosniak, Albanian and Turkish Muslims. Both countries have long absorbed migrations of Muslims from these populations. Additionally, Islam has had a historical presence in Poland and Lithuania, albeit limited. Communities of Tatar Muslims settled in the Polish–Lithuanian Commonwealth during the 15th and 16th centuries. Tatar Muslim minorities remain in Poland and Lithuania to this day.

Before the Holocaust (1941–45), there was also a sizeable Ashkenazi Jewish community in the region, numbering approximately 16.7 million people. Poland and Lithuania had the largest Jewish populations in Europe as a percentage of their total populations, with Jews constituting 9.5% of the Polish population and 7.6% of the Lithuanian population in 1933.

Certain countries in Central Europe, particularly the Czech Republic, Germany and Switzerland have sizeable atheist and non-religious populations. In 2021, 48% of the Czech population declared that they had no religion. In 2022, 43.8% of the German population declared that they had no religion. Meanwhile, 33.5% of the Swiss population stated that they were not affiliated with any religion.

=== Cuisine ===
Central European cuisine has evolved over centuries because of social and political change and is generally diverse. However, the national cuisines of western Central Europe share notable similarities, as do the cuisines of eastern Central Europe. Sausages, salamis and cheeses are popular in most of Central Europe, with the earliest evidence of cheesemaking in the archaeological record dates back to 5,500 BCE (Kuyavia region, Poland). Other popular food items in Central Europe include soups, stews, pickled and fermented vegetables. Schnitzel and variations of spätzle are popular in the region.

Another common feature among Central European cuisines, particularly Austrian, Croatian, Lithuanian, Slovenian and Swiss cuisine, is the use of wild ingredients in traditional dishes, spanning from wild herbs to mushrooms and berries. Beer consumption is also prominent in parts of Central Europe, where the Czech Republic has the highest beer consumption per capita globally, followed by Austria, with Germany coming 4th. The cuisines of Central European countries that are included in broader definitions of Eastern Europe share similarities and traditions with other Eastern European cuisines. This is particularly evident in the cuisines of Czech Republic, Lithuania, Poland and Slovakia, which feature dishes such as borscht and pierogi. The cuisines of Croatia, Hungary and Slovenia feature a number of culinary traditions common within the Balkans, including dishes such as stuffed peppers, stuffed cabbage, bean soup, pogača, and ajvar/zacuscă.

=== Human rights ===
Generally, the countries in the region have been progressive on the issue of human rights: death penalty is illegal in all of them, corporal punishment is outlawed in most of them and people of both genders can vote in elections. However, Central European countries are divided on the subject of same-sex marriage and abortion. Austria, the Czech Republic, Germany, and Poland also have a history of participation in the CIA's extraordinary rendition and detention program, according to the Open Society Foundations.

=== Literature ===
Regional writing tradition revolves around the turbulent history of the region, as well as its cultural diversity. Its existence is sometimes challenged. Specific courses on Central European literature are taught at Stanford University, Harvard University and Jagiellonian University as well as cultural magazines dedicated to regional literature. Angelus Central European Literature Award is an award worth 150,000.00 PLN (about $50,000 or £30,000) for writers originating from the region. Likewise, the Vilenica International Literary Prize is awarded to a Central European author for "outstanding achievements in the field of literature and essay writing".

=== Sport ===
There is a number of Central European Sport events and leagues. They include:

- Central European Tour Miskolc GP (Hungary)*
- Central European Tour Budapest GP (Hungary)
- 2008 Central Europe Rally (Romania and Hungary)*
- 2023 Central Europe Rally (Germany, Austria and Czech Republic)
- Central European Football League (Austria, Croatia, Hungary, Serbia, Slovakia, Slovenia and Turkey)
- Central European International Cup (Austria, Czechoslovakia, Hungary, Italy, Poland, Switzerland and Yugoslavia; 1927–1960)
- Central Europe Throwdown*

Football is one of the most popular sports. Countries of Central Europe hosted several major competitions. Germany hosted two FIFA World Cups (1974 and 2006) and two UEFA European Championships (1988 and 2024). Yugoslavia hosted the UEFA Euro 1976 before the competition expanded to 8 teams. Recently, the 2008 and 2012 UEFA European Championships were held in Austria & Switzerland and Poland & Ukraine respectively.

== Politics ==
=== Organisations ===
Central Europe is a birthplace of regional political organisations:

- Central European Defence Cooperation
- Central European Free Trade Agreement
- Central European Initiative
- Centrope
- Middleeuropean Initiative
- Three Seas Initiative
- Visegrád Group
Central European Defence Cooperation

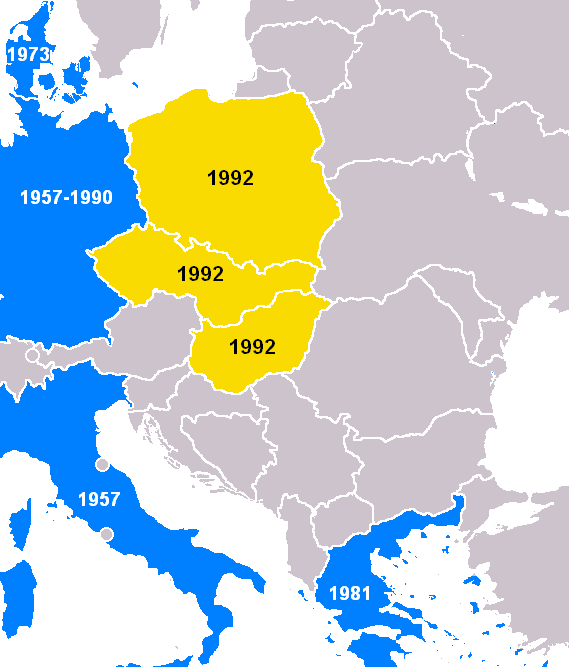
CEFTA founding states

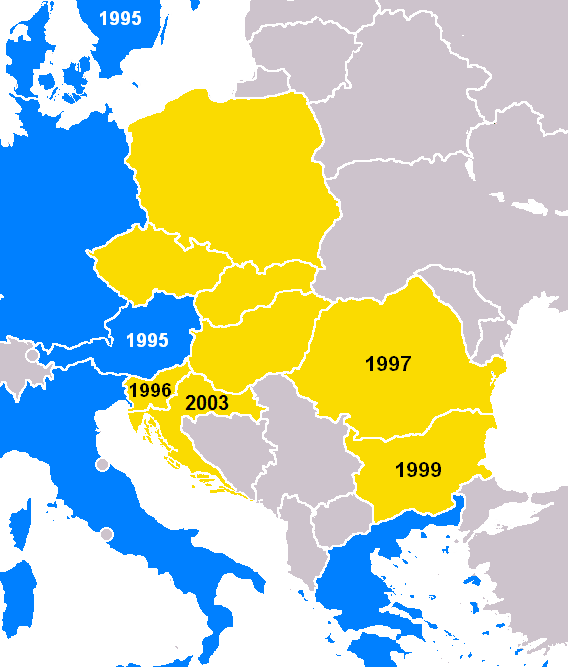
CEFTA members in 2003, before joining the EU

Current CEFTA members

Central European Initiative

Three Seas Initiative

Visegrád Group

=== Democracy Index ===
The Economist Intelligence Unit Democracy index map for 2022, with greener colours representing more democratic countries

Central Europe is a home to some of world's oldest democracies. However, most of them have been impacted by totalitarianism, particularly Fascism and Nazism. Germany and Italy occupied all Central European countries, except Switzerland. In all occupied countries, the Axis powers suspended democracy and installed puppet regimes loyal to the occupation forces. Also, they forced conquered countries to apply racial laws and formed military forces for helping German and Italian struggle against Communists. After World War II, almost the whole of Central Europe (the Eastern and Middle part) had been transformed into communist states, most of which had been occupied and later allied with the Soviet Union, often against their will through forged referendum (such as the Polish people's referendum in 1946) or force (northeast Germany, Poland, Hungary et alia). Nevertheless, those experiences have been dealt in most of them. Most Central European countries score very highly in the Democracy Index.

=== Corruption ===
Most countries in Central Europe tend to score above the average in the Corruption Perceptions Index (2018 data), led by Switzerland, Germany, and Austria.

=== Global Peace Index ===
Global Peace Index Scores

In spite of its turbulent history, Central Europe is currently one of world's safest regions. Most Central European countries are in top 20%.

== Central European Time ==
Central European Time zone (dark red)

Although many countries in the areas variously defined as "Central Europe" use Central European Time, some (such as Lithuania) do not; and others within the time zone, such as Italy and Spain, are not usually considered part of Central Europe.

== In popular culture ==
Central Europe is mentioned in the 35th episode of Lovejoy, entitled "The Prague Sun", filmed in 1992. While walking over the well-regarded and renowned Charles Bridge in Prague, the main character, Lovejoy, says: "I've never been to Prague before. Well, it is one of the great unspoiled cities in Central Europe. Notice: I said: 'Central', not 'Eastern'! The Czechs are a bit funny about that, they think of Eastern Europeans as turnip heads."

Wes Anderson's Oscar-winning film The Grand Budapest Hotel depicts a fictional grand hotel located somewhere in Central Europe, which is in actuality modelled on the Grandhotel Pupp in Karlovy Vary in the Czech Republic. The film is a celebration of 1920s and 1930s Central Europe with its artistic splendor and societal sensibilities.

== See also ==
- Central and Eastern Europe
- Central European Defence Cooperation
- East-Central Europe
- Geographical midpoint of Europe
- Life zones of central Europe
- Międzymorze (Intermarium)
- Mitteleuropa
- Three Seas Initiative
- Visegrád Group

== General and cited references ==
- Bláha, Jan D.; Nováček, Aleš (2016). "How Central Europe is Perceived and Delimited". Mitteilungen der Österreichischen Geographischen Gesellschat. 158: 193–214. doi:10.1553/moegg158s193.
- Ádám, Magda (2003). The Versailles System and Central Europe Variorum Collected Studies. Ashgate. ISBN 0-86078-905-5.
- Ádám, Magda (1993). The Little Entente and Europe(1920–1929). Akadémiai Kiadó. ISBN 963-05-6420-3.
- Ágh, Attila (1998). The politics of Central Europe. Sage. ISBN 0-7619-5032-X.
- Aleksov, Bojan; Piahanau, Aliaksandr (2020). Wars and Betweenness: Big Powers and Middle Europe, 1918-1945. Central European University Press. ISBN 978-963-386-336-7.
- Hayes, Bascom Barry (1994). Bismarck and Mitteleuropa. Fairleigh Dickinson University Press. ISBN 978-0-8386-3512-4.
- Evans, Robert J. W. (2006). "Central Europe: The History of An Idea". Austria, Hungary, and the Habsburgs: Central Europe c. 1683-1867. Oxford. pp. 293–304. doi:10.1093/acprof:oso/9780199541621.003.0016. ISBN 9780199281442. OCLC 70258980.
- Johnson, Lonnie R. (1996). Central Europe: enemies, neighbors, friends. Oxford University Press. ISBN 978-0-19-510071-6.
- Kamusella, Tomasz. (2021). Words in Space and Time: A Historical Atlas of Language Politics in Modern Central Europe. Budapest and New York: Central European University Press.
- Kamusella, Tomasz. (2023). "Central Europe's Limits in the North and the South" (pp. 83-112). Acta Slavica Iaponica. Vol. 44.
- Katzenstein, Peter J. (1997). Mitteleuropa: Between Europe and Germany. Berghahn Books. ISBN 978-1-57181-124-0.
- Magocsi, Paul Robert (2002). Historical Atlas of Central Europe (Rev. and expanded ed.). University of Toronto Press. ISBN 978-0-8020-8486-6. OCLC 150672781.
- O. Benson, Forgacs (2002). Between Worlds. A Sourcebook of Central European Avant-Gardes, 1910–1930. MIT Press. ISBN 978-0-262-02530-0.
- Tiersky, Ronald (2004). Europe today. Rowman & Littlefield. ISBN 978-0-7425-2805-5.
- Tötösy de Zepetnek, Steven; Vasvári, Louise Olga (2011). Comparative Hungarian Cultural Studies. Comparative cultural studies. West Lafayette, Indiana: Purdue University Press. ISBN 978-1-55753-593-1. OCLC 1088215162.
- Shared Pasts in Central and Southeast Europe, 17th–21st Centuries. Eds. G. Demeter, P. Peykovska. 2015
