= Ronald Tiersky =

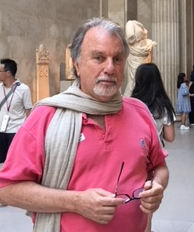
Ronald Tiersky

Ronald Tiersky is the Joseph B. Eastman Professor of Political Science Emeritus at Amherst College, Amherst, Massachusetts.

== Career ==
Tiersky taught political science and European Studies at Amherst for four decades. During 1980-82 he was Director of the Johns Hopkins School of Advanced International Studies center in Bologna, Italy. He was associated over the years with the Paris Centre d’études des relations internationales (CERI).

Tiersky is a member of the Council on Foreign Relations, and he is the founding editor and general editor of the "Europe Today" series at Rowman & Littlefield publishers.

== Early life and education ==
Raised in Chicago, IL, Tiersky did his B.A. at the University of Illinois (Champaign-Urbana) in history. He did his M.A. (1971) and Ph, D. (1972), in Political Science, at Columbia University.

He lived in Paris, France 1969-1973 researching his dissertation and first book, on the French Communist Party, where his mentors were Profs. Raymond Aron, Pierre Hassner, and Annie Kriegel.

== Bibliography ==
Tiersky has written widely on European politics, American foreign policy and international politics.

Books authored

- ‘’French Communism, 1920-1972’’ (Columbia University Press, 1974)
- ‘’Ordinary Stalinism’’ - Allen & Unwin (1985)
- ‘’France in the New Europe’’ (Wadsworth Pubs., 1994)
- ‘’Euro-skepticism’’ (ed., Rowman & Littlefield Pubs. 2001)
- ‘’Francois Mitterrand: a very French President’’ (Rowman & Littlefield Pubs., 2nd rev. ed., 2003)
- ‘’Europe: a year of living dangerously’’ (with Alex Tiersky, Foreign Policy Association, 2004)
- ‘’European Foreign Policies’’ (ed., with John Van Oudenaren, 2010) Rowman & Littlefield Pubs

Books edited

- ‘’Europe Today’’, (5th ed. with Erik Jones, 2015) Rowman & Littlefield Pubs.

His articles and editorials have appeared in Foreign Affairs, The New York Times, the New York Review of Books, the International Herald Tribune, Le Monde, Le Point, Libération, and RealClearWorld.
