= Middleeuropean Initiative =

Austria-based think tank

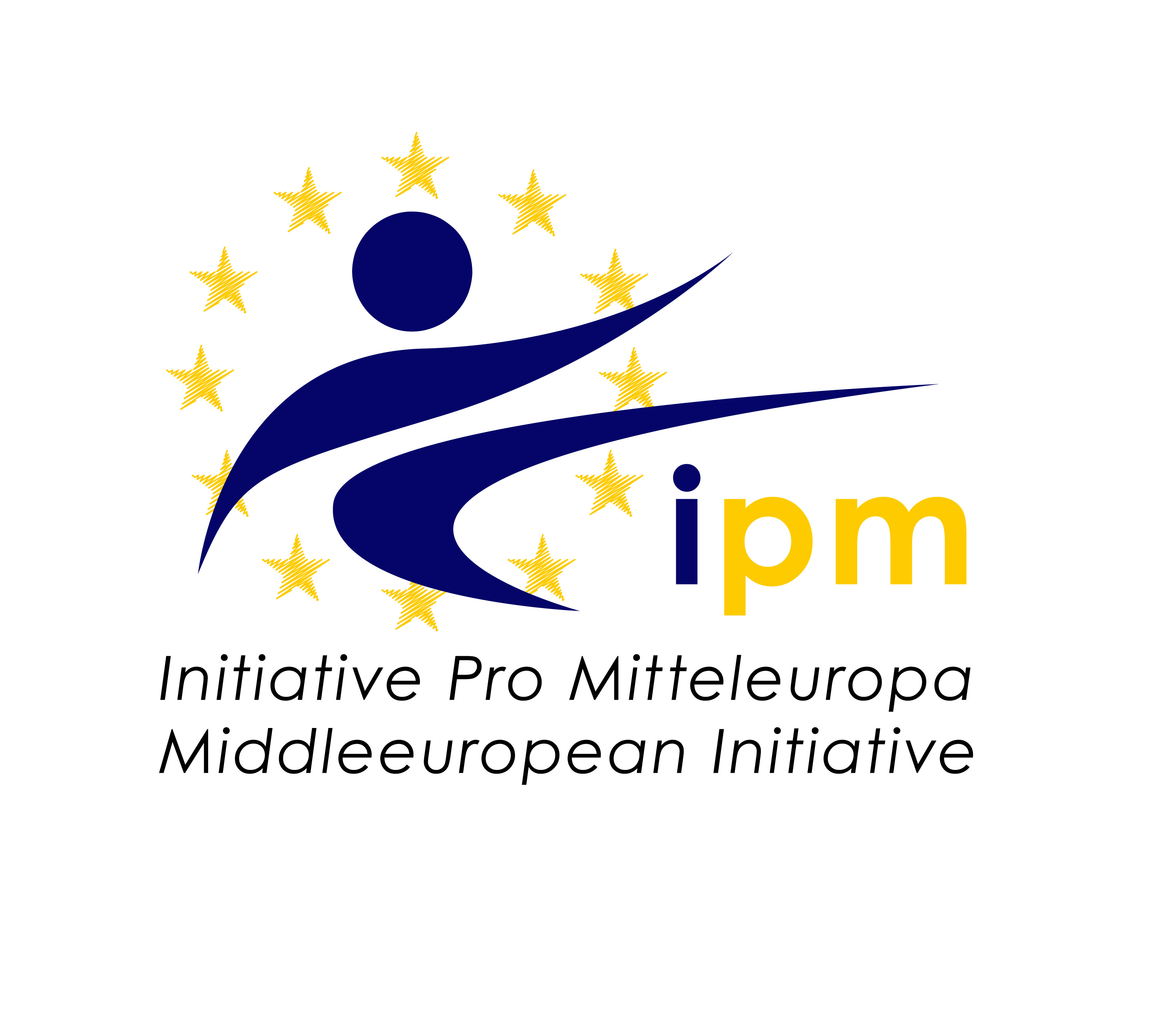
- Formation: 2010
- Type: Non-governmental organization
- Purpose: Central European cooperation
- Headquarters: Vienna
- Region served: Europe
- President: Philipp Depisch
- Secretary General: Matthias Huber
- Main organ: main board
- Website: IPM website

The Initiative Pro Mitteleuropa - Middleeuropean Initiative (also Forum Fürstenfeld) in short ("IPM") is an international think tank, based in Vienna. President of IPM is Philipp Depisch from Austria.

== History ==
The foundation took place in Vienna on Nov. 20th 2010.

On January 12, 2012, IPM was a co-organizer of an international forum in Vienna, which was attended by representatives from 14 states.

From August 23 to August 25, 2013, IPM International and IPM Slovenia conducted the first "local event" of YEPP together with the "Youth of the Slovenian Democratic Party" (SDM) in Ptuj/Slovenia. There the participants from Hungary, Austria and Slovenia discussed the topic of youth employment.

IPM again co-hosted a large international conference on July 2, 2014, in Vienna. 110 guests from 16 nations discussed the issue of "European energy policy".

IPM completed its focus on "Energy" in 2014 with a conference in Fürstenfeld/Austria on Oct. 10th. The conference was preceded by an article of Austria's second largest newspaper Kleine Zeitung, introducing IPM and its president.

On April 23, 2016, IPM celebrated its five-year anniversary in Klosterneuburg together with Johannes Schmuckenschlager, president of the Austrian winegrower federation.

Together with DEMYC the Middleeuropean Initiative conducted an international congress on "Migration - Challenges and Opportunities" in July 2016 in Graz/Austria including almost 70 participants from 20 different countries (among others Armenia, Irak, Israel, Russia, Ukraine). During this congress both organisations adopted a joint resolution against a possible membership of Turkey in the European Union.

General meeting and elections again took place on March 11, 2017, in the Austrian Parliament. During this event the "Middle-Europe-Award" was introduced. With this IPM wants to honor special people who have gained earnings to the European peace project.

A meeting with former UN secretary-general Ban Ki-moon was the highlight of the IPM "summit" in Alpbach/Austria on August 27, 2018.

Elections again took place on May 15, 2021. In March 2022 the Middleeuropean Initiative organized a transport of medicines to Lviv, Ukraine.

== Self-image and structure ==
The IPM sees itself as a "network platform", sets up environmental priorities and supports events in the fields of politics, culture and sports. The organization is based in Vienna.

== Christa Pollak (Middle Europe -) Award winners ==
- 2017: Mikuláš Dzurinda, former prime minister of Slovakia and president of the Centre for European Studies.
- 2018: Franz Majcen, former president of the state parliament of Styria.
- 2019 Boris Pahor, Slovenian/Italian writer.
- 2020 Thomas Goppel, chairman of CSU "Seniorenunion" and former Bavarian state minister.
- 2021 Rainer-Bernd Wolschner, physician.
- 2023 Walther Ryzienski, historian.
- 2024 Kurt Jakomet, former president of Junge Alpenregion.
- 2026 Thomas Einwallner, former Austrian politician.
