= Bulgaria–Greece–Romania–Serbia UEFA Euro 2028 and 2030 FIFA World Cup bid =

Football World Cup host nation bid

2030 Bulgaria–Greece–Romania–Serbia UEFA Euro 2028 and 2030 FIFA World Cup bid
- Bulgarian: България-Гърция-Румъния-Сърбия 2030
- Greek: Βουλγαρία-Ελλάδα-Ρουμανία-Σερβία 2030
- Romanian: Bulgaria-Grecia-România-Serbia 2030
- Serbian: Бугарска-Грчка-Румунија-Србија 2030; Bugarska-Grčka-Rumunija-Srbija 2030

Tournament details
- Host countries: Bulgaria; Greece; Romania; Serbia
- Teams: 48 (from 6 confederations)
- Venues: 16 (in 14 host cities)

The Bulgaria–Greece–Romania–Serbia UEFA Euro 2028 and 2030 FIFA World Cup bid was a joint bid to host the UEFA Euro 2028 and 2030 FIFA World Cup by Bulgaria, Greece, Romania and Serbia. The bid was led by the Craiova Group.

On 25 February 2019, at the meeting in Sofia, Bulgaria of the Ministers of Youth and Sports of Romania, Constantin Bogdan Matei; Bulgaria, Krasen Kralev; Serbia, Vanja Udovičić and Deputy Minister of Culture and Sports of Greece, Giorgos Vasileiadis, it was officially confirmed that these four countries would submit joint candidacy for the organization of the UEFA Euro 2028 and the 2030 FIFA World Cup. Following the second meeting, the ministers signed a memorandum of understanding on 10 April 2019 in Thessaloniki, Greece. However, the project was quietly abandoned, mainly due to Greece bidding with Egypt and Saudi Arabia.

== Possible venues ==
For the 2026 FIFA World Cup, it is confirmed that stadiums must have a capacity of at least 40,000 for group round matches and second round matches, 50,000 for quarter final and 60,000 for the semi-finals and at least 80,000 for the Opening Match and Final; none of the countries concerned have stadiums with such a capacity for the opening and final matches as of yet and the rules for 2030 have not been announced. Olympic Stadium was the stadium mentioned to host the Opening Match, while the Bucharest Arena was set for the Final match.

=== Bulgaria ===
Sofia	Plovdiv
Vasil Levski National Stadium	Plovdiv Stadium
Capacity: 44,000 (to be renovated and expanded to 50,000)	Capacity: 55,000 (to be renovated)
Bulgarian cities
Burgas	Varna
Chernomorets Arena	New Varna Stadium
Capacity: 30,000 (Planned)	Capacity: 22,000 (Under Construction)

=== Greece ===
Athens
Olympic Stadium	Agia Sophia Stadium
Capacity: 75,000	Capacity: 31,800
Greek cities
Athens	Thessaloniki
New Panathinaikos Stadium	New Toumba Stadium
Capacity: 40,000	Capacity: 41,926 (Planned)

=== Romania ===
Bucharest	Cluj-Napoca
Arena Națională	Cluj Arena
Capacity: 55,634	Capacity: 30,201
Romanian cities
Craiova	Iași
Stadionul Ion Oblemenco	New Iași Arena
Capacity: 30,983	Capacity: 25,000 (Planned)
Timișoara
New Timișoara Stadium
Capacity: 30,000 (Planned)

=== Serbia ===
Belgrade
New National Stadium	Rajko Mitić Stadium
Capacity: 60,000 (Planned)	Capacity: 55,538 (To be renovated)
Serbian cities
Niš	Kragujevac
Čair Stadium	Čika Dača Stadium
Capacity: 18,151 (to be renovated and expanded to 25 000)	Capacity: 15,100 (to be renovated and expanded to 20 000)

== Key people ==
- Borislav Mihaylov – president of the Bulgarian Football Union
- Evangelos Grammenos – president of the Hellenic Football Federation
- Răzvan Burleanu – president of the Romanian Football Federation
- Slaviša Kokeza – president of the Football Association of Serbia

== See also ==
- Uruguay–Argentina–Chile–Paraguay 2030 FIFA World Cup bid
- Spain–Portugal–Morocco 2030 FIFA World Cup bid
