= List of FIFA World Cup hosts =

Countries that hosted the FIFA World Cup

Logo of FIFA

Nineteen countries have hosted the FIFA World Cup in the competition's twenty-three tournaments since the inaugural World Cup in 1930. FIFA at first awarded hosting to countries at meetings of its congress. The choice of location was controversial in the earliest tournaments, given the three-week boat journey between South America and Europe, the two centers of strength in football at the time.

The decision to hold the first cup in Uruguay, for example, led to only four European nations competing. The next two World Cups were held in Europe. The decision to hold the second of these, the 1938 FIFA World Cup, in France was controversial, as the South American countries had been led to understand that the World Cup would alternate between the two continents. Argentina and Uruguay thus boycotted the tournament. The first tournament following World War II, held in Brazil in 1950, had three teams withdraw because of financial problems or disagreements with the organisation.

In order to avoid any future boycotts or controversy, FIFA stuck to a pattern of alternation between the Americas and Europe, which continued until the 2002 FIFA World Cup in Japan and South Korea, the first to be held in Asia. The system evolved so that the host country is now chosen in a vote by FIFA's Congress. This is done under an exhaustive ballot system. The decision is currently made roughly seven years in advance of the tournament, though the hosts for the 2030 tournament were chosen at the same time as those for the 2034 tournament. The longest time between host selection and tournament was for the 1982 FIFA World Cup, which was awarded to Spain in 1966.

Only Mexico (three times), Italy, the United States, France, Germany (West Germany until shortly after the 1990 World Cup) and Brazil have hosted the event at least twice. Mexico City's Estadio Azteca and Rio de Janeiro's Maracanã are the only venues to have hosted two FIFA World Cup finals.

The 2002 FIFA World Cup was the first with more than one host. The 2026 FIFA World Cup was the first to be hosted by more than two countries. To mark the 100th anniversary of the tournament in 2030, there will be three host countries (Morocco, Portugal, and Spain), with three additional countries (Argentina, Paraguay, and Uruguay) hosting celebratory centenary matches.

Uruguay in 1930, Italy in 1934, England in 1966, West Germany in 1974, Argentina in 1978 and France in 1998 are the only nations to win the World Cup as hosts.

== List of host nations ==
| Year | Host nation(s) | Confederation(s) |
|---|---|---|
| 1930 | Uruguay | CONMEBOL |
| 1934 | Italy | UEFA |
| 1938 | France | UEFA |
| 1942 | Cancelled due to World War II | |
| 1946 | Cancelled due to World War II | |
| 1950 | Brazil | CONMEBOL |
| 1954 | Switzerland | UEFA |
| 1958 | Sweden | UEFA |
| 1962 | Chile | CONMEBOL |
| 1966 | England | UEFA |
| 1970 | Mexico | CONCACAF |
| 1974 | Germany | UEFA |
| 1978 | Argentina | CONMEBOL |
| 1982 | Spain | UEFA |
| 1986 | Mexico | CONCACAF |
| 1990 | Italy | UEFA |
| 1994 | United States | CONCACAF |
| 1998 | France | UEFA |
| 2002 | South Korea; Japan | AFC |
| 2006 | Germany | UEFA |
| 2010 | South Africa | CAF |
| 2014 | Brazil | CONMEBOL |
| 2018 | Russia | UEFA |
| 2022 | Qatar | AFC |
| 2026 | Canada; United States; Mexico | CONCACAF |
| 2030 | Morocco; Portugal; Spain; Anniversary match hosts: Argentina; Paraguay; Uruguay | CAF; UEFA; CONMEBOL |
| 2034 | Saudi Arabia | AFC |

== 1930 FIFA World Cup ==
Bids:

- Uruguay
- ~~Hungary~~
- ~~Italy~~
- ~~Netherlands~~
- ~~Spain~~
- ~~Sweden~~

Before the FIFA Congress could vote on the first-ever World Cup host, a series of withdrawals led to the election of Uruguay. The Netherlands withdrew, followed by Sweden withdrawing in favour of Italy. Then Hungary withdrew. Finally, both Italy and Spain withdrew, in favour of the only remaining candidate, Uruguay. The FIFA Congress met in Barcelona, Spain on 18 May 1929 to ratify the decision, and Uruguay was chosen without a vote.

Results:

1. Uruguay

The celebration of the first World Cup coincided with the centennial anniversary of the first Constitution of Uruguay. For that reason, the main stadium built in Montevideo for the World Cup was named Estadio Centenario.

== 1934 FIFA World Cup ==
Bids:

- Italy
- ~~Sweden~~

Sweden decided to withdraw before the vote, as Italians were lobbying FIFA for superior conditions. As such decision that Italy would host the 1934 World Cup was ratified by the FIFA Congress in Stockholm, Sweden on 14 May 1932. The Italian Football Federation accepted the hosting duties on 9 October 1932.

Results:

1. Italy

== 1938 FIFA World Cup ==
Bids:

- Argentina
- France
- Germany

Without any nations withdrawing their bids, the FIFA Congress convened in Berlin, Germany on 13 August 1936 to decide the next host. Electing France took only one ballot, as France had more than half of the votes in the first round.

Results:

1. France, 19 votes
2. Argentina, 3 votes
3. Germany, 1 vote

== 1942 and 1946 FIFA World Cups (cancelled) ==
Bids for 1942:

- Brazil
- Germany

Brazil and Germany bid for the 1942 FIFA World Cup, but FIFA eventually cancelled the tournament entirely due to the outbreak of the World War II in September 1939.

== 1950 and 1954 FIFA World Cups ==
=== 1950 bid ===
Bid:

- Brazil

After the cancellation of the 1946 FIFA World Cup due to the aftermath of World War II, the World Cup returned. The 1950 World Cup was originally scheduled for 1949, but the day after Brazil was selected by the FIFA Congress on 26 July 1946 in Luxembourg City, Luxembourg, the World Cup was rescheduled for 1950.

Result:

1. Brazil

=== 1954 bid ===
Bid:

- Switzerland

The 1954 World Cup hosting duty was decided on 26 July 1946, the same day that Brazil was selected for the 1950 World Cup, in Luxembourg City. On 27 July, the FIFA Congress pushed back the 5th World Cup finals, deciding it should take place in 1954.

Result:

1. Switzerland

== 1958 FIFA World Cup ==
Bid:

- Sweden

Argentina, Chile, Mexico, and Sweden expressed interest in hosting the tournament. Swedish delegates lobbied other countries at the FIFA Congress held in Rio de Janeiro around the opening of the 1950 World Cup finals. Sweden was awarded the 1958 tournament unopposed on 23 June 1950.

Result:

1. Sweden

== 1962 FIFA World Cup ==
Bids:

- Argentina
- Chile
- ~~West Germany~~

West Germany withdrew before the vote, which took place in Lisbon, Portugal on 10 June 1956, leaving two remaining bids. In one round of voting, Chile won over Argentina.

Results:

1. Chile, 32 votes
2. Argentina, 11 votes
3. ~~West Germany~~ withdrew

== 1966 FIFA World Cup ==
Bids:

- England
- West Germany
- ~~Spain~~

Spain withdrew from the bidding prior to voting by the FIFA Congress, held in Rome, Italy on 22 August 1960. As before, there was only one round of voting, with England beating West Germany.

Results:

1. England, 34 votes
2. West Germany, 27 votes
3. ~~Spain~~ withdrew

== 1970 FIFA World Cup ==
Bids:

- Argentina
- Mexico

The FIFA Congress convened in Tokyo, Japan on 8 October 1964. One round of voting saw Mexico win the hosting duties over Argentina.

Results:

1. Mexico, 56 votes
2. Argentina, 32 votes

== 1974, 1978, 1982 FIFA World Cups ==
Three hosts for the 1974, 1978, and 1982 World Cups were chosen in London, England on 6 July 1966 by the FIFA Congress. Spain and West Germany, both facing each other in the running for hosting duties for the 1974 and 1982 World Cups, agreed to give one another a hosting job. Germany withdrew from the 1982 bidding process while Spain withdrew from the 1974 bidding process, essentially guaranteeing each a hosting spot. Mexico, who had won the 1970 hosting bid over Argentina just two years prior, agreed to withdraw and let Argentina take the 1978 hosting position.

=== 1974 results ===
1. West Germany
2. ~~Spain~~ withdrew in exchange for 1982 hosting duties

=== 1978 results ===
1. Argentina
2. ~~Mexico~~ withdrew, as they had won hosting for 1970

=== 1982 results ===
1. Spain
2. ~~West Germany~~ withdrew in exchange for 1974 hosting duties

== 1986 FIFA World Cup ==
Bid:

- Colombia

Host voting, handled by the then-FIFA Executive Committee (or Exco), met in Stockholm, Sweden on 9 June 1974 and ratified the unopposed Colombian bid.

Result:

1. Colombia

However, Colombia resigned hosting rights on 5 November 1982, less than four years before the event was to start, due to a multitude of domestic reasons: financial pressures and insufficient support, increasing crime rate, and most urgently due to a lack of progress in developing infrastructure and criteria meeting stadiums.

A call for bids was sent out again, and FIFA received intent from three nations:

- Canada
- Mexico
- United States

In Stockholm on 20 May 1983, Mexico won the bidding unanimously as voted by the executive committee, for the first time in FIFA World Cup bidding history (excluding nations who bid unopposed).

Results:

1. Mexico, unanimous vote
2. United States, 0 votes
3. Canada, 0 votes

== 1990 FIFA World Cup ==
Bids:

- Italy
- Soviet Union
- ~~England~~
- ~~Greece~~

Except Italy and the Soviet Union, all nations withdrew before the vote, which was to be conducted by Exco in Zürich on 19 May 1984. Once again, only one round of voting was required, as Italy won more votes than the Soviet Union.

Results:

1. Italy, 11 votes
2. Soviet Union, 5 votes
3. ~~England~~ withdrew
4. ~~Greece~~ withdrew

== 1994 FIFA World Cup ==
Bids:

- Brazil
- Morocco
- United States

Despite having three nations bidding, voting only took one round. The vote was held in Zürich on 4 July 1988. The United States gained a majority of votes of the Exco members.

Results:

1. United States, 10 votes
2. Morocco, 7 votes
3. Brazil, 2 votes

== 1998 FIFA World Cup ==
Bids:

- France
- Morocco
- ~~Switzerland~~

This vote was held in Zürich on 1 July 1992. Only one round of voting was required to have France assume the hosting job over Morocco.

Result:

1. France, 12 votes
2. Morocco, 7 votes
3. ~~Switzerland~~ withdrew

== 2002 FIFA World Cup ==
Bids:

- South Korea
- Japan
- ~~Mexico~~

Mexico withdrew on 28 February 1996. On 31 May 1996, the hosting selection meeting was held in Zürich. A joint bid was formed between Japan and South Korea, and the unopposed bid was "voted by acclamation", an oral vote without ballots.

Results:

1. South Korea/Japan (joint bid, voted by acclamation)
2. ~~Mexico~~ withdrew

The 2002 FIFA World Cup was co-hosted in Asia for the first time by South Korea and Japan (the opening match was held in South Korea and the final was held in Japan). Initially, the two Asian countries were competitors in the bidding process. But just before the vote, they agreed with FIFA to co-host the event. However, the rivalry and distance between them led to organizational and logistical problems. FIFA has said that co-hosting is not likely to happen again, and in 2004 officially stated that its statutes did not allow co-hosting bids. This policy has since been overturned as the United States, Mexico, and Canada were chosen to be joint hosts for the 2026 World Cup.

== 2006 FIFA World Cup ==
Bids:

- England
- Germany
- Morocco
- South Africa
- ~~Brazil~~

On 6 July 2000, the host selection meeting was held in Zürich. On 4 July 2000, Brazil withdrew its bid before the vote, and the field was narrowed to four. This was the first selection in which more than one vote round was required. Three rounds of votes were eventually needed. Germany was at least tied for first in each of the three votes, and ended up defeating South Africa by only one vote after an abstention (see below).

Results
| Nation | Rounds | | |
| Nation | 1 | 2 | 3 |
|---|---|---|---|
| Germany | 10 | 11 | 12 |
| South Africa | 6 | 11 | 11 |
| England | 5 | 2 | - |
| Morocco | 3 | - | - |
| Brazil | Withdrew | | |
| Total votes | 24 | 24 | 23 |

=== Controversy ===
The controversy over the decision to award the 2006 FIFA World Cup to Germany led to a further change in practice. The final tally was 12 votes to 11 in favour of Germany over the contenders South Africa, who had been favourites to win. New Zealand FIFA member Charlie Dempsey, who was instructed to vote for South Africa by the Oceania Football Confederation, abstained from voting at the last minute. If he had voted for the South African bid, the tally would have been 12–12, giving the decision to FIFA President Sepp Blatter, who, it was widely believed, would then have voted for South Africa.

Dempsey was among eight members of the executive committee to receive a fax from editors of the German satirical magazine Titanic on Wednesday, the night before the vote, promising a cuckoo clock and Black Forest ham in exchange for voting for Germany. He argued that the pressure from all sides including "an attempt to bribe" him had become too much for him.

On 4 August 2000, consequently, FIFA decided to rotate the hosting of the final tournaments between its constituent confederations. However, in October 2007, during the selection of the host for the 2014 FIFA World Cup, they announced that they would no longer continue with the continental rotation policy (see below).

== 2010 FIFA World Cup ==
The first World Cup bidding process under continental rotation (the process of rotating hosting of the World Cup to each confederation in turn) was the 2010 FIFA World Cup, the first World Cup to be held in Africa. On 7 July 2001, during the FIFA Congress in Buenos Aires, a decision was ratified that the rotation would begin in Africa. On 23 September 2002, FIFA's executive committee confirmed that only African member associations would be invited to submit bids to host the 2010 FIFA World Cup.

Bids

- Egypt
- Morocco*
- South Africa
- ~~Libya / Tunisia~~ withdrew

In January 2003, Nigeria also planned to enter the bidding process. Nigeria had hoped to bid jointly with West African neighbours Benin, Cameroon, Ghana, and Togo. In March 2003, Sepp Blatter said Nigeria's plan to co host the 2010 FIFA World Cup with four African countries would not work. Nigeria did not submit a separate bid and ultimately ended their ambition in September.

After it was confirmed by FIFA that joint bidding would not be allowed in the future, Libya and Tunisia withdrew both of their bids on 8 May 2004. On 15 May 2004 in Zürich, South Africa, after a narrow loss in the 2006 bidding, defeated perennial candidate Morocco to host, 14 votes to 10. Egypt received no votes.

Vote
| South Africa | 14 |
| Morocco | 10 |
| Egypt | 0 |
| Libya / Tunisia | Withdrew |
| Total votes | 24 |

=== Controversy ===
On 28 May 2015, media covering the 2015 FIFA corruption case reported that high-ranking officials from the South African bid committee had secured the right to host the World Cup by paying US$10 million in bribes to then-FIFA Vice-president Jack Warner and to other FIFA Executive Committee members.

On 4 June 2015, FIFA executive Chuck Blazer, having co-operated with the Federal Bureau of Investigation and the Swiss authorities, confirmed that he and the other members of FIFA's executive committee were bribed in order to promote the South African 1998 and 2010 World Cups. Blazer stated, "I and others on the FIFA executive committee agreed to accept bribes in conjunction with the selection of South Africa as the host nation for the 2010 World Cup."

On 6 June 2015, The Daily Telegraph reported that Morocco had received the most votes, but South Africa was awarded the tournament instead.

== 2014 FIFA World Cup ==
FIFA continued its continental rotation procedure by earmarking the 2014 World Cup for South America. FIFA initially indicated that it might back out of the rotation concept, but later decided to continue it through the 2014 host decision, after which it was dropped.

Bids:

- Brazil

Colombia had expressed interest in hosting the 2014 World Cup, but withdrew, undertaking the 2011 FIFA U-20 World Cup. Brazil also expressed interest in hosting the World Cup. CONMEBOL, the South American Football Federation, indicated their preference for Brazil as a host. Brazil was the only nation to submit a formal bid when the official bidding procedure for CONMEBOL member associations was opened in December 2006, as by that time, Colombia, Chile and Argentina had already withdrawn, and Venezuela was not allowed to bid.

Brazil made the first unopposed bid since the initial selection of the 1986 FIFA World Cup (when Colombia was selected as host, but later withdrew for financial problems). The FIFA Executive Committee confirmed it as the host country on 30 October 2007 by a unanimous decision.

Result:

Vote
| Bidders | Round 1 |
|---|---|
| Brazil | unanimous vote |

== 2018 and 2022 FIFA World Cups ==
FIFA announced on 29 October 2007 that it would no longer continue with its continental rotation policy, implemented after the 2006 World Cup host selection. The newest host selection policy is that any country may bid for a World Cup, provided that their continental confederation has not hosted either of the past two World Cups. Also, FIFA formally allowed joint bids once more (after they were banned in 2002), because there was only one organising committee per joint bid, unlike Korea–Japan, which had two different organising committees.

2018 Bids

- Belgium and Netherlands
- England
- Portugal and Spain
- Russia

2022 Bids

- Australia
- Japan
- Qatar
- South Korea
- United States

For the 2018 World Cup bidding process, bids from Africa and South America were not allowed. For the 2022 World Cup bidding process, bids from South America and Europe were not allowed. Countries that announced their interest included Australia, England, Indonesia, Japan, Qatar, Russia, South Korea, United States, the joint bid of Spain and Portugal and the joint bid of Belgium and Netherlands.

The hosts for both World Cups were announced by the FIFA Executive Committee on 2 December 2010. Russia was selected to host the 2018 FIFA World Cup, making it the first time that the World Cup was hosted in Eastern Europe and making it the biggest country geographically to host the World Cup. Qatar was selected to host the 2022 FIFA World Cup, making it the first time a World Cup was held in the Arab World and the second time in Asia since the 2002 tournament in South Korea and Japan. Also, the decision made it the smallest country geographically to host the World Cup.

2018 results
| Nation | Rounds | |
| Nation | 1 | 2 |
|---|---|---|
| Russia | 9 | 13 |
| Portugal and Spain | 7 | 7 |
| Belgium and Netherlands | 4 | 2 |
| England | 2 | - |
| Total votes | 22 | 22 |

2022 results
| Nation | Rounds | | | |
| Nation | 1 | 2 | 3 | 4 |
|---|---|---|---|---|
| Qatar | 11 | 10 | 11 | 14 |
| United States | 3 | 5 | 6 | 8 |
| South Korea | 4 | 5 | 5 | - |
| Japan | 3 | 2 | - | - |
| Australia | 1 | - | - | - |
| Total votes | 22 | 22 | 22 | 22 |

== 2026 FIFA World Cup ==
Under FIFA rules as of 2016, the 2026 Cup could not be in either Europe (UEFA) or Asia (AFC), leaving an African (CAF) bid, a North American (CONCACAF) bid, a South American (CONMEBOL) bid or an Oceanian (OFC) bid as other possible options. In March 2017, FIFA's president Gianni Infantino confirmed that "Europe (UEFA) and Asia (AFC) had been excluded from the bidding following the selection of Russia and Qatar in 2018 and 2022 respectively."

The bidding process was originally scheduled to start in 2015, with the appointment of hosts scheduled for the FIFA Congress on 10 May 2017 in Kuala Lumpur, Malaysia. On 10 June 2015, FIFA announced that the bid process for the 2026 FIFA World Cup was postponed. However, following the FIFA Council meeting on 10 May 2016, a new bid schedule was announced for May 2020 as the last in a four-phase process.

On 14 October 2016, FIFA said it would accept a tournament-sharing bid by CONCACAF members Canada, Mexico and the United States.

On 10 April 2017, Canada, the United States, and Mexico announced their intention to submit a joint bid to co-host, with three-quarters of the games to be played in the US, including the final.

On 11 August 2017, Morocco officially announced a bid to host.

Therefore, the official 2026 FIFA World Cup bids were from two football confederations. The first one was from CONCACAF, which was triple bid by Canada, United States and Mexico, and the second one was from CAF with a bid by Morocco.

The host was announced on 13 June 2018 at the 68th FIFA Congress in Moscow, Russia. The United Bid from Canada, Mexico and the United States was selected over the Morocco bid by 134 votes to 65 with 1 selecting neither and 3 abstentions. This was the first World Cup to be hosted by more than two countries. Mexico became the first country to host three men's World Cups and its Estadio Azteca also became the first stadium to stage three World Cup tournaments. On the other hand, Canada became the fifth country to host both the men's and women's World Cups, after Sweden (Men's: 1958/Women's: 1995), the United States (Men's: 1994/Women's: 1999, 2003), Germany (Men's: 1974, 2006/Women's: 2011), and France (Men's: 1938, 1998/Women's: 2019). The United States became the first country to host both men's and women's World Cup twice each. Additionally, all three host nations are now among those who have hosted both the FIFA World Cup and the Summer Olympic Games.

2026 Results
| Nation | Vote |
| Nation | Round 1 |
|---|---|
| Canada, Mexico, and United States | 134 |
| Morocco | 70 |
| Total votes | 210 |

== 2030 FIFA World Cup ==
The first proposed bid was a collective bid by the members of the Argentine Football Association and Uruguayan Football Association into a proposed joint bid from Uruguay and Argentina. The second bid was a proposed bid by The Football Association of England. Under FIFA rules as of 2017 that prohibit the previous two confederations hosting the next world Cup, the 2030 World Cup could not be held in Asia (AFC) because the Asian Football Confederation was excluded from the bidding following the selection of Qatar in 2022, nor in North America because the CONCACAF countries of the United States, Canada and Mexico are hosting the 2026 World Cup. Also in June 2017, UEFA's president Aleksander Čeferin stated that Europe (UEFA) will definitely fight for its right to host the 2030 World Cup.

The Uruguay–Argentina proposed bid would not coincide with the centennial anniversary of the first FIFA World Cup final, and the bicentennial of the first Constitution of Uruguay, but if selected the tournament dates would coincide. The Uruguay-Argentina bid was officially confirmed on 29 July 2017. A joint bid was announced by the Argentine Football Association and the Uruguayan Football Association on 29 July 2017. Before Uruguay and Argentina played out a goalless draw in Montevideo, FC Barcelona players Luis Suárez and Lionel Messi promoted the bid with commemorative shirts. On 31 August 2017, it was suggested Paraguay would join as a third host. CONMEBOL, the South American confederation, confirmed the joint three-way bid in September 2017.

English FA vice-chairman David Gill had proposed that his country could bid for 2030, provided the bidding process was made more transparent. "England is one of few countries that could stage even a 48-nation event in its entirety, while Football Association chief executive Martin Glenn made it clear earlier this year bidding for 2030 was an option." In June 2017, UEFA stated that "it would support a pan-British bid for 2030 or even a single bid from England." On 15 July 2018, Deputy Leader of the UK Labour Party, Tom Watson, said in an interview that he and his party backed a 2030 World Cup bid for the UK saying that "I hope it's one of the first things a Labour government does, which is work with our FA to try and put a World Cup bid together." On 16 July 2018, British Prime Minister Theresa May expressed her support of the bid and her openness about discussions with football authorities. Although there had been no prior discussion with the Football Association, the Scottish FA also expressed its interest about joining a Home Nations bid. Former Scottish First Minister Henry McLeish called for the Scottish government and the Scottish Football Association to bid for the 2030 FIFA World Cup with the other British nations.

On 17 June 2018, the Royal Moroccan Football Federation announced its co-bidding for the 2030 World Cup. The possibility for a joint bid with Tunisia and Algeria was raised.

On 17 June 2018, the English Football Association announced that they were in talks with home nations over a UK-wide bid to host the 2030 World Cup. On 1 August 2018, it was reported that the FA was preparing a bid for England to host the World Cup in 2030. The Scottish Football Association considered the potential British bid as a great opportunity to get funds to renovate and redevelop Hampden Park in Glasgow, the Scotland national football team's home stadium. On 4 September 2018, it was announced that the Republic of Ireland was in talks exploring the possibility to join 2030 the World Cup bid.

On 10 July 2018, Egypt's Sports Minister expressed interest in bidding.

Cameroonian presidential candidate Joshua Osih's political program included nominating his country along with two sub-Saharan African countries to host the 2030 World Cup, according to Cameroonian channel CRTV.

On 12 September 2018, Prime Minister of Spain Pedro Sánchez discussed the possibility for Spain to bid with FIFA President Gianni Infantino and Royal Spanish Football Federation President Luis Rubiales. On 8 June 2019, Spain and Portugal expressed interest in co-hosting the 2030 FIFA World Cup.

On 2 November 2018, Prime Minister of Bulgaria Boyko Borisov stated that his Greek counterpart Alexis Tsipras had proposed a joint bid by Bulgaria, Romania, Serbia and Greece during the Balkan Four meeting in Varna. At the meeting of the Ministers of Youth and Sports of Serbia, Vanja Udovičić, Bulgaria's Krasen Kralev, Romania's Constantin Bogdan Matei and Deputy Minister of Culture and Sports of Greece, Giorgos Vasileiadis, it was officially confirmed that these four countries would submit a joint candidacy for the organisation of the 2028 UEFA European Football Championship and the 2030 World Cup.

On 15 January 2019 FIFA president Gianni Infantino supported the Morocco, Portugal and Spain bid to host the 2030 World Cup, dealing a blow for England, Ireland, Northern Ireland, Scotland and Wales' hope, though it was still "very early" to speak of it.

Chile confirmed their bid to host with the group on 14 February 2019 as a joint communique from the confirmed nations joining Argentina, Paraguay and Uruguay.

On 4 October 2023 it was announced that Spain, Portugal and Morocco would host the majority of the 2030 FIFA World Cup in a unanimous decision from the FIFA Council, with one "celebratory game" each being held in Uruguay, Argentina and Paraguay.

2030 Results
| Nation | Vote |
| Nation | Round 1 |
|---|---|
| Morocco, Portugal, Spain, Argentina, Paraguay and Uruguay | 37 |
| Abstain | 0 |
| Total votes | 37 (Note: This vote was exclusive to the FIFA Council.) |

2024 Extraordinary FIFA Congress 11 December 2024 – Zürich, Switzerland
| Nation | Round 1 |
|---|---|
| Morocco, Spain, Portugal | Acclamation |

== 2034 FIFA World Cup ==
The bidding process for the 2034 World Cup began on 4 October 2023 and used the same requirements as the 2030 World Cup. Due to FIFA's confederation rotation policy, only member associations from the Asian Football Confederation and Oceania Football Confederation were eligible to host. The deadline for confirmed interest from bidding associations was 31 October, 25 days after the bidding requirements were announced.

The first bid for the 2034 FIFA World Cup had been proposed as a collective bid by the members of the Association of Southeast Asian Nations.

The idea of a combined ASEAN bid had been mooted as early as January 2011, when the former Football Association of Singapore President, Zainudin Nordin, said in a statement that the proposal had been made at an ASEAN Foreign Ministers meeting, despite the fact that countries cannot bid directly - this is up to national associations. In 2013, Nordin and Special Olympics Malaysia President, Datuk Mohamed Feisol Hassan, recalled the idea for ASEAN to jointly host a World Cup.

Under FIFA rules as of 2017, the 2030 World Cup cannot be held in Asia (AFC) as Asian Football Confederation members are excluded from the bidding following the selection of Qatar in 2022. Therefore, the earliest bid by an AFC member could be made for 2034.

Later, Malaysia withdrew from involvement, but Singapore and other ASEAN countries continued the campaign to submit a joint bid for the World Cup in 2034. In February 2017, ASEAN held talks on launching a joint bid during a visit by FIFA President Gianni Infantino to Yangon, Myanmar. On 1 July 2017, Vice General Chairman of the Football Association of Indonesia Joko Driyono said that Indonesia and Thailand were set to lead a consortium of Southeast Asian nations in the bid. Driyono added that due to geographical and infrastructure considerations and the expanded format (48 teams), at least two or three ASEAN countries combined would be in a position necessary to host matches.

In September 2017, the Thai League 1 Deputy CEO Benjamin Tan, at the ASEAN Football Federation (AFF) Council meeting, confirmed that his Association has "put in their interest to bid and co-host" the 2034 World Cup with Indonesia. On the same occasion, the General Secretary of the AFF, Dato Sri Azzuddin Ahmad, confirmed that Indonesia and Thailand will submit a joint bid. Indonesia is the only Southeast Asian country to have participated in the World Cup, when the territory was known as the Dutch East Indies.

However, in June 2018, FIFA executive committee member and crown prince and regent of Pahang, Tengku Abdullah who is also the former president of the Football Association of Malaysia (FAM) expressed interest in joining the three countries in hosting the World Cup together. The four countries have jointly hosted a football event before during the 2007 AFC Asian Cup: if the FAM agrees to rejoin the project, they would be the first to submit a four-country joint bid in the FIFA World Cup history.

The second bid is from Egypt. Its Sports and Youth Minister Ashraf Sobhy said that Egypt has considered a bid to host the 2034 FIFA World Cup. Such a bid should be prepared by the national football association rather than the country. This bid was abandoned when Morocco was announced to cohost the 2030 World Cup.

After its failed bid to host the 2022 FIFA World Cup, Australia has considered a joint bid with neighbouring New Zealand, an OFC member with which they co-hosted the 2023 FIFA Women's World Cup. Australia re-established this intention in August 2021, shortly after Brisbane's success in bidding to host the 2032 Summer Olympics. A joint bid with Indonesia and New Zealand was also discussed by Football Australia.

Football Australia chief executive, James Johnson, said his organisation is "exploring the possibility" following FIFA's deadline for bids to be submitted by 31 October 2023. A major challenge to the bid however has been the need to construct more stadiums or expanded current stadiums to FIFA standards. Indonesia was in talks with Australia with a joint bid, though they pulled out on 18 October, backing the Saudi bid instead like much of the AFC. On 31 October, Football Australia put out a statement saying that they had decided against bidding, leaving Saudi Arabia as the sole bid.

After Saudi Arabia abandoned its 2030 bid alongside Greece and Egypt, they switched their focus to a solo 2034 bid. Similar strategies to those employed at the 2022 FIFA World Cup in Qatar may be used to mitigate the country's summer heat, though they have insisted on a plan to host in the summer. The country's bid was announced on 4 October 2023. On 5 October, AFC President Sheikh Salman bin Ibrahim Al Khalifa backed Saudi Arabia's bid. On the 9th, Saudi Arabia announced that it had submitted the official letter of intent, and signed the declaration to FIFA to bid to host the 2034 FIFA World Cup. Less than 72 hours after SAFF declared its intention to bid for the FIFA World Cup, over 100 FIFA Member Associations from across different continents had publicly pledged their support.

In December of 2024, FIFA ratified Saudi Arabia to become the host of the 2034 World Cup during the FIFA Congress with an uncontested bidding process where Saudi Arabia was the only candidate in the bidding. This is the first time Saudi Arabia hosts the World Cup.

- AFC:
  - Saudi Arabia

Abandoned bids:

- AFC–UEFA:
  - Uzbekistan and Kazakhstan
- AFC:
  - Brunei, Cambodia, Indonesia, Laos, Malaysia, Myanmar, Philippines, Singapore, Thailand and Vietnam
  - China, Japan, North Korea and South Korea
- AFC–OFC:
  - Australia, New Zealand and Indonesia

2024 Extraordinary FIFA Congress; 11 December 2024 – Zürich, Switzerland
| Nation | Round 1 |
| Saudi Arabia | Acclamation |

== Future FIFA World Cups (2038–2062) ==
=== 2038 FIFA World Cup ===
In May 2025, FIFA vice-president Victor Montagliani supported the idea of England to make either a solo bid or another joint United Kingdom bid for the 2038 FIFA World Cup, pointing to existing infrastructure as well as the successful bids for UEFA Euro 2028 and the 2035 FIFA Women's World Cup. That same month, The Athletic reported that New Zealand was considering a joint bid, possibly with Fiji and the United States. In March 2026, Latvian Minister of Economics Viktors Valainis expressed interest in the tournament being jointly co-hosted by the countries of the Baltic-Nordic region and Lublin Triangle, based on the model of the Euro 2020. In April 2026, the DFB announced interest in Germany bidding for either the 2038 or 2042 World Cup. That same month, the FIGC announced interest in Italy hosting the 2038 World Cup. In June 2026, the FFF announced interest in France hosting the 2038 World Cup. That same month, the United States also said they were interested, but it was unclear if they would bid solo or bring in additional hosts.

If the current hosting rotation model is still in place for the 2038 World Cup, the only eligible confederations that could bid for the tournament would be CONCACAF or OFC, as Europe, Africa and South America will jointly co-host the 2030 World Cup and Asia will host in 2034. However, the bidding process has not yet been confirmed by FIFA.

=== 2042 FIFA World Cup ===
In July 2025, Nikkei Asia reported that Japan is exploring its potential interest in bidding for either the 2042 or 2046 World Cup with a possible joint bid involved with South Korea and China, other Eastern Asian countries, or ASEAN nations.

In April 2026, the DFB announced interest in Germany bidding for either the 2038 or 2042 World Cup.

In September 2026, Matvii Bidnyi, the sports minister of Ukraine, and an unnamed Polish official stated the two nations were considering a joint bid for the 2040s, however Poland's sports ministry denied this soon after.

=== 2046 FIFA World Cup ===
In July 2025, Japan Times reported that Japan might bid to host the 2046 World Cup along with other East Asian nations.

=== 2050 FIFA World Cup ===
On July 23, 2026, Striver Football reported that Australia is eyeing for bid to host the 2050 World Cup, following the success of the 2023 FIFA Women's World Cup.

=== 2062 FIFA World Cup ===
A private and independent initiative advocates for Chile to host the 2062 FIFA World Cup. The country would once again host an edition of the tournament a hundred years later, when it hosted the 1962 FIFA World Cup.

== Total bids by country ==
World Cup-winning bids are bolded. Withdrawn bids that were officially considered by FIFA are italicised. Bids for tournaments that weren't organized are ~~struckthrough~~. Rejected bids, as well as planned but not-yet-official bids for 2038 and beyond, are not included.

| Country | Bids | Years | Times hosted |
|---|---|---|---|
| Germany | 7 | 1938, ~~1942~~, 1962, (Note: Bid by West Germany.) 1966, **1974**, 1982, **2006** | 2 |
| Spain | 6 | 1930, 1966, 1974, **1982**, 2018, (Note: Joint bid by Spain and Portugal.) **2030** (Note: Joint bid by Spain, Portugal, Morocco) | 1 + 1 upc. |
| Morocco | 6 | 1994, 1998, 2006, 2010, 2026, **2030** | 0 + 1 upc. |
| Argentina | 5 | 1938, 1962, 1970, **1978**, **2030** (Note: Honorary Host) | 1 + 1 upc. |
| Brazil | 5 | ~~1942~~, **1950**, 1994, 2006, **2014** | 2 |
| Mexico | 5 | **1970**, 1978, **1986**, (Note: Colombia was originally chosen to host the 1986 World Cup, but withdrew from hosting for economic concerns. After a second bidding, Mexico was selected as the replacement host.) 2002, **2026** (Note: Joint bid by Canada, Mexico and the United States.) | 3 |
| England | 4 | **1966**, 1990, 2006, 2018 | 1 |
| United States | 4 | 1986, **1994**, 2022, **2026** | 2 |
| Sweden | 3 | 1930, 1934, **1958** | 1 |
| Italy | 3 | 1930, **1934**, **1990** | 2 |
| Netherlands | 2 | 1930, 2018 (Note: Joint bid by Belgium and the Netherlands.) | 0 |
| Uruguay | 2 | **1930, 2030** | 1 + 1 upc. |
| France | 2 | **1938**, **1998** | 2 |
| Switzerland | 2 | **1954**, 1998 | 1 |
| Canada | 2 | 1986, **2026** | 1 |
| Russia | 2 | 1990, (Note: Bid by the Soviet Union.) **2018** | 1 |
| Japan | 2 | **2002**, (Note: Joint bid by Japan and South Korea.) 2022 | 1 |
| South Korea | 2 | **2002**, 2022 | 1 |
| South Africa | 2 | 2006, **2010** | 1 |
| Portugal | 2 | 2018, **2030** | 0 + 1 upc. |
| Hungary | 1 | 1930 | 0 |
| Chile | 1 | **1962** | 1 |
| Colombia | 1 | **~~1986~~** | 0 |
| Iran | 1 | 1978 | 0 |
| Greece | 1 | 1990 | 0 |
| Egypt | 1 | 2010 | 0 |
| Libya | 1 | 2010 (Note: Joint bid by Libya and Tunisia.) | 0 |
| Tunisia | 1 | 2010 | 0 |
| Belgium | 1 | 2018 | 0 |
| Australia | 1 | 2022 | 0 |
| Qatar | 1 | **2022** | 1 |
| Paraguay | 1 | **2030** | 0 + 1 upc. |
| Saudi Arabia | 1 | **2034** | 0 + 1 upc. |

== Host country performances ==
Except in 1934, when Italy had to qualify for the main tournament, host nations have always been granted automatic spots in the World Cup.

It is widely considered that home advantage is a benefit in the World Cup, with the host team usually performing above average. In 13 of the 23 tournaments a host country has reached the last four. Of the eight teams that have won the tournament, all except Brazil and Spain have been champions while hosting, with England winning its only title as hosts. Further, Sweden got to its only final on home soil. Chile and South Korea had their only semi-final finishes at home, and Mexico (twice) and an independent Russia achieved their only finishes in the top eight while hosting. South Africa in 2010 and Qatar in 2022 are the only hosts to not go past the first round, while Qatar is the only host to lose not only their opening game but all three games, while every other team has won a match in the tournament they hosted.

| Year | Team | Result | Note | Pld | W | D | L | GF | GA | GD |
|---|---|---|---|---|---|---|---|---|---|---|
| 1930 | Uruguay | Champions | First tournament to be held | 4 | 4 | 0 | 0 | 15 | 3 | +12 |
| 1934 | Italy | Champions | Defending champions Uruguay declined to participate | 5 | 4 | 1 | 0 | 12 | 3 | +9 |
| 1938 | France | Quarter-finals | | 2 | 1 | 0 | 1 | 4 | 4 | 0 |
| 1950 | Brazil | Runners-up | | 6 | 4 | 1 | 1 | 22 | 6 | +16 |
| 1954 | Switzerland | Quarter-finals | Equalled best result | 4 | 2 | 0 | 2 | 11 | 11 | 0 |
| 1958 | Sweden | Runners-up | Best result | 6 | 4 | 1 | 1 | 12 | 7 | +5 |
| 1962 | Chile | Third place | Best result | 6 | 4 | 0 | 2 | 10 | 8 | +2 |
| 1966 | England | Champions | England Men's only major tournament victory | 6 | 5 | 1 | 0 | 11 | 3 | +8 |
| 1970 | Mexico | Quarter-finals | Best result | 4 | 2 | 1 | 1 | 6 | 4 | +2 |
| 1974 | West Germany | Champions | | 7 | 6 | 0 | 1 | 13 | 4 | +9 |
| 1978 | Argentina | Champions | | 7 | 5 | 1 | 1 | 15 | 4 | +11 |
| 1982 | Spain | Second round (top 12) | | 5 | 1 | 2 | 2 | 4 | 5 | −1 |
| 1986 | Mexico | Quarter-finals | | 5 | 3 | 2 | 0 | 6 | 2 | +4 |
| 1990 | Italy | Third place | | 7 | 6 | 1 | 0 | 10 | 2 | +8 |
| 1994 | United States | Round of 16 | | 4 | 1 | 1 | 2 | 3 | 4 | −1 |
| 1998 | France | Champions | | 7 | 6 | 1 | 0 | 15 | 2 | +13 |
| 2002 | South Korea | Fourth place | Best result | 7 | 3 | 2 | 2 | 8 | 6 | +2 |
| 2002 | Japan | Round of 16 | | 4 | 2 | 1 | 1 | 5 | 3 | +2 |
| 2006 | Germany | Third place | | 7 | 5 | 1 | 1 | 14 | 6 | +8 |
| 2010 | South Africa | First round | First host country to be eliminated in the group stage | 3 | 1 | 1 | 1 | 3 | 5 | −2 |
| 2014 | Brazil | Fourth place | | 7 | 3 | 2 | 2 | 11 | 14 | −3 |
| 2018 | Russia | Quarter-finals | Best result since dissolution of the Soviet Union | 5 | 2 | 2 | 1 | 11 | 7 | +4 |
| 2022 | Qatar | First round | Debutant, only host to lose all games played | 3 | 0 | 0 | 3 | 1 | 7 | –6 |
| 2026 | Canada | Round of 16 | Best result | 5 | 2 | 1 | 2 | 9 | 6 | +3 |
| 2026 | Mexico | Round of 16 | | 5 | 4 | 0 | 1 | 10 | 3 | +7 |
| 2026 | United States | Round of 16 | | 5 | 3 | 0 | 2 | 11 | 8 | +3 |
| 2030 | Morocco | TBD | | | | | | | | |
| 2030 | Portugal | TBD | | | | | | | | |
| 2030 | Spain | TBD | | | | | | | | |
| 2034 | Saudi Arabia | TBD | | | | | | | | |

== See also ==
- FIFA Women's World Cup hosts
- List of Olympic Games host cities
