= Ionuț Stroe =

Romanian politician (born 1979)

Member of the Chamber of Deputies
- Incumbent
- Assumed office 19 December 2008
- Constituency: Dolj

Minister of Youth and Sports
- In office 4 November 2019 – 23 December 2020
- Prime Minister: Ludovic Orban
- Preceded by: Constantin-Bogdan Matei
- Succeeded by: Carol-Eduard Novak

Personal details
- Born: 23 September 1979 (age 46)
- Party: National Liberal Party

Ionuț-Marian Stroe (born 23 September 1979) is a Romanian politician of the National Liberal Party who has been a member of the Chamber of Deputies since 2008.

== Political career ==
From 2019 to 2020, Stroe served as minister of youth and sports.

In addition to his role in parliament, Stroe has been serving as a member of the Romanian delegation to the Parliamentary Assembly of the Council of Europe since 2013. As a member of the National Liberal Party, he was initially part of the Alliance of Liberals and Democrats for Europe group before moving to the European People's Party group in 2014. He is currently a member of the Committee on Migration, International Protection and Economic Co-operation (since 2025); the Committee on the Honouring of Obligations and Commitments by Member States of the Council of Europe, or Monitoring Committee, (since 2022); and the Committee on Political Affairs and Democracy (since 2021). Alongside Asim Mollazadə and later Paweł Jabłoński, he has been serving as the Assembly's co-rapporteur on Albania since 2023.

== Personal life ==
In 2022, Stroe married the stepdaughter of Marcel Vela.
