= Robert Harrison (football executive) =

Paraguayan football executive (born 1973)

Robert Alexis Luis Harrison Paleari
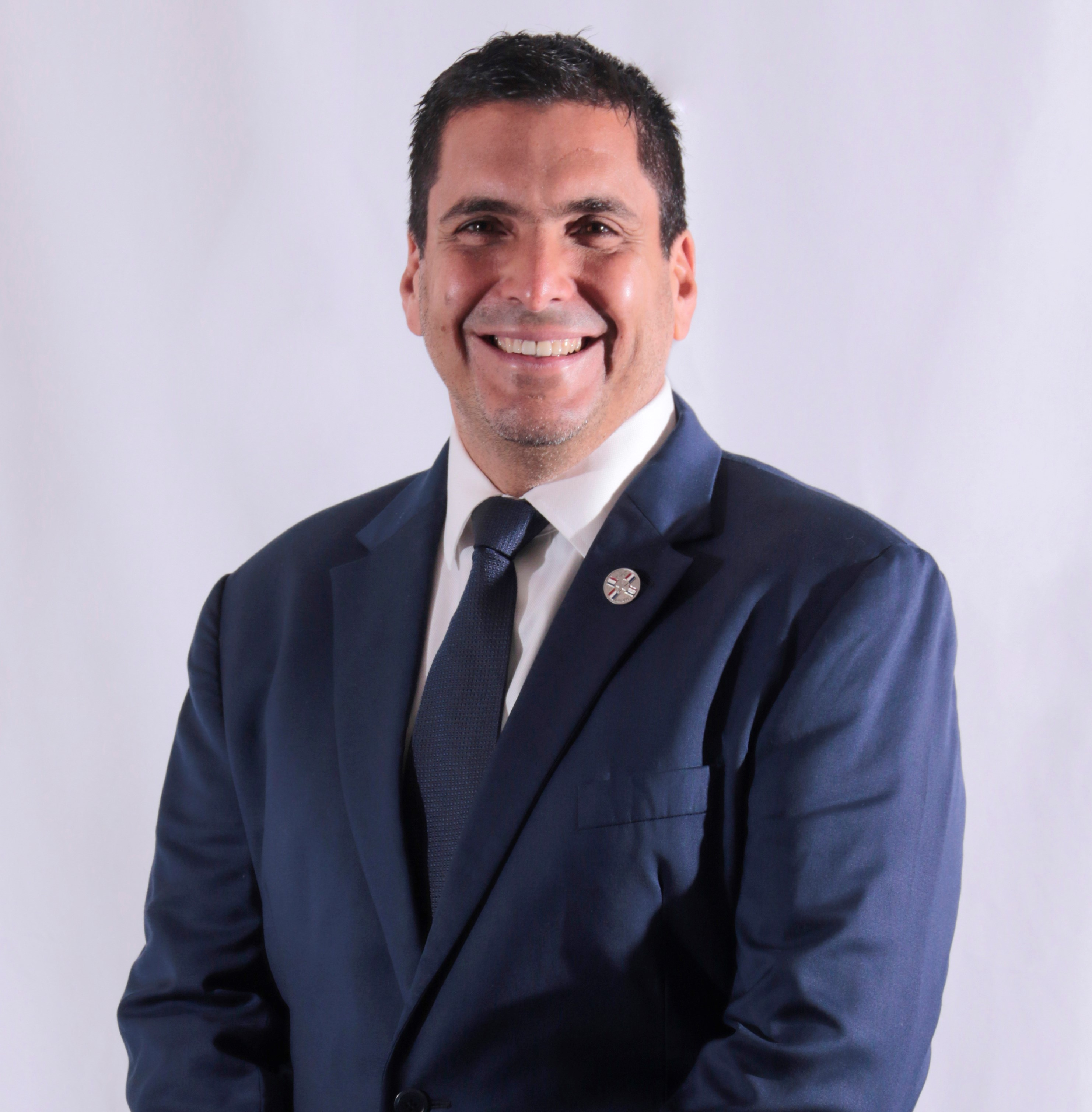
- Born: 27 August 1973 (age 52); Asunción, Paraguay
- Title: President of Paraguayan Football Association
- Term: 2016-2026
- Predecessor: Ramón González Daher
- Spouse: Patricia Campos
- Children: 4
- Website: Robert Harrison on X

Robert Alexis Luis Harrison Paleari (born August 27, 1973) is a Paraguayan businessman and football executive, president of the Paraguayan Football Association (APF) since April 2016.

== Personal life and professional career ==
Robert Harrison is a graduate of the traditional Colegio Goethe and has a degree in Accounting Sciences and Business Administration from Columbia University of Paraguay. He is a shareholder and director of companies in the pharmaceutical and health sectors and also in graphic design.

Harrison is the son of notary public Óscar Harrison, former president of the Paraguayan Football Association, and María Eugenia Paleari and grandson of Colonel Sampson Harrison, who played an important role during the Chaco War and was also president of the APF. He is married to Patricia Campos and they have four children.

== Career as football executive ==
Between 1998 and 2007, Harrison was a member of the APF Youth Teams Department.

In 2000, he joined the board of directors of Club Nacional and from 2002 to 2004 he held the position of second vice president. He later became first vice president and, in 2006, he was elected president of the football team.

During Harrison's presidency, Nacional was champion of the 2009 Torneo Clausura after 63 without obtaining titles in the first division. Nacional also won the 2011 Torneo Apertura and the 2013 Torneo Apertura. In 2014, the team obtained the second place in the Copa Libertadores de América, its greatest international victory to date.

In 2015, he joined the executive committee of the Paraguayan Football Association. He was elected president of the APF in 2016 after beating Federico Acosta, president of Club Guaraní. He replaced Ramón González Daher, who had held the presidency of the Association on an interim basis since January after the resignation of Alejandro Domínguez, who was elected president of Conmebol. In 2017 he was re-elected for a five-year term ending in 2022.

Under his management, two new tournaments were created, the Copa Paraguay in 2018 and the Supercopa Paraguay in 2019.

In 2019, Harrison headed the organizing committee for the FIFA Beach Soccer World Cup, which took place in Paraguay at the Los Pynandi World Cup Stadium.

Robert Harrison is also one of the directors of the Conmebol Council and the president of its Teams Competitions Commission. Since 2017, he has been a member of the Organizing Committee for FIFA Competitions.

In August 2022, Harrison represented Paraguay and the APF to launch the joint bid for Uruguay, Paraguay, Argentina and Chile to host the 2030 FIFA World Cup.

In 2023, he was reelected for a second period as president of the Paraguayan Football Association.

In 2024, the Paraguayan Women's Football Championship began to be officially called Campeonato Anual FEM and created new women's football tournaments: Copa EFE, Copa Paraguay FEM and Supercopa FEM.
