= Paraguayan Football Association =

Governing body of association football in Paraguay

CONMEBOL
- Founded: 1906; 120 years ago
- Headquarters: Luque
- Location: 1 Medallistas Olímpicos, Parque Olímpico, Luque
- FIFA affiliation: 1925
- CONMEBOL affiliation: 1921
- President: Robert Harrison
- General Secretary: Luis Kanonnikoff
- Website: apf.org.py

The Paraguayan Football Association (Spanish: Asociación Paraguaya de Fútbol [asosjaˈsjom paɾaˈɣwaʝa ðe ˈfuðβol]; APF; Guarani: Paraguái Mangapy Atyguasu) is the governing body of football in Paraguay. It organizes the Paraguayan football league, including futsal and beach soccer, as well as and the Paraguay national football team. It is based in the city of Luque, near the capital city, Asunción. Football is the most popular sport in Paraguay.

== History ==
In the late 1890s William Paats brought soccer to Paraguay, when it was then played at an Asunción teacher's college. Escuela Normal de Maestros.

On June 18, 1906, the representatives of the five existing football teams in Paraguay at that time (Olimpia, Guaraní, Libertad, General Díaz, and Nacional) met to establish the Paraguayan Football League, named Liga Paraguaya de Football Association. The first match was played on a Sunday, July 8, 1906. Adolfo Riquelme, who was a well known Paraguayan journalist, was the organization's first president.

In 1921, during the presidency of Enrique Pinho, the Paraguayan Football League joined the South American Football Confederation (CONMEBOL). In 1925 it became a member of FIFA. In 1941 it changed its name to Liga Paraguaya de Football and in 1957 the name was Hispanicized as Liga Paraguaya de Fútbol.

On December 3, 1998, its name was changed to its current denomination, Asociación Paraguaya de Fútbol, which coincidentally is one of the names that had been adopted by a dissident football association that brought together some teams which would later join the League, and which organized championships between 1911 and 1917.

In 2016, APF appointed Robert Harrison, the former head of Club Nacional, as president. Harrison succeeded Alejandro Domínguez, who resigned to run for president of CONMEBOL, after Juan Ángel Napout stepped down from that role in December 2015. In 2019, APF hired Argentinian Eduardo Berizzo as manager of Paraguay's national men's team.

Paraguay have not previously hosted the FIFA World Cup. In August 2022, APF joined up with the football associations of Argentina, Uruguay and Chile to jointly bid to host the World Cup in 2030.

== Institutional Succession ==
From its foundation in 1906 until it adopted its final name in 1998, the APF followed the following institutional trajectory:

Founded: 18 June 1906
Liga Paraguaya de Football Association (LPFA)

Affiliation to the Conmebol: 1921
The Paraguayan Football League becomes a member of the South American Football Confederation, during the presidency of Enrique Pinho.

Affiliation to FIFA: 1925
The LPF joins the Member Associations of the International Federation of Association Football.

Change of name: 1941
Paraguayan Football League

LPF

Castellanisation: 1957
Paraguayan Football League

LPF

Change of name: December 1998
Paraguayan Football Association

APF

== Honours ==
- Copa América champions — 1953, 1979
- Olympic Games silver medal (Athens 2004)
- FIFA World Cup 8 participations — 1930, 1950, 1958, 1986, 1998, 2002, 2006, 2010

The Paraguay national team appeared in the World Cup finals eight times, reaching the quarter-finals in the world FIFA event in South Africa (2010), losing to the eventual tournament victor, a Spanish team.

The Club Olimpia has been indomitable: 38 Paraguayan championship titles; 3 in the Copa Libertadores — the continental South American soccer tournament (1979, 1990, 2002); and Intercontinental cup.

== Leadership and staff ==
=== Presidents ===
==== Liga Paraguaya de Football Association ====
Name	Period
Dr. Adolfo Riquelme	1906–1908
Dr. Eusebio Ayala	1908–1909
Don William Paats	1909–1910
Don Emilio Mantera	1910–1910
Don Junio Quinto Godoi	1910–1911
Don Alejandro Gatti	1911–1913
Dr. Enrique L. Pinho	1913–1923
Dr. Juan Manuel Álvarez	1923–1924
Dr. Esteban Semidei	1924–1926
Prof. Dr. Adriano Irala	1926–1928
Don Manuel Bedoya	1928–1931
Don Juan Pablo Gorostiaga	1931–1932
Dr. Ignacio L. Parra	1932–1932
Dr. Francisco Esculies	1935–1936
Don Ramón T. Cartes	1936–1937
Don Manuel Galiano	1937–1938
Dr. Juan Arturo Lavigne	1939–1940
Cnel. Sampson Harrison	1940–1940

==== Liga Paraguaya de Football ====
Name	Period
Dr. Manuel Bedoya	1941–1941
Dr. Julio César Airaldi	1942–1944
Dr. Crispín Insaurralde	1944–1945
Don Fulgencio R. Moreno	1945–1946
Don Oscar Pinho Insfrán	1946–1947
Dr. Lorenzo N. Livieres	1947–1948
Clte. Ramón Martino	1948–1948
Dr. Blas A. Dos Santos	1948–1950
Don Lidio Quevedo	1950–1951
Dr. Blas A. Dos Santos	1951–1952
Dr. Alfonso Capurro	1952–1954
Don Lidio Quevedo	1954–1955
Dr. Raimundo Paniagua	1955–1956
Dr. Alfonso Capurro	1956–1957

==== Liga Paraguaya de Fútbol ====
Name	Period
Dr. Pedro Recalde	1957–1957
Dr. Ernesto Gavilán	1958–1959
Dr. Hassel Aguilar Sosa	1959–1960
Dr. Tulio Manuel Quiroz	1960–1961
Dr. Manuel Duarte Pallarés	1961–1963
Dr. Anastacio Mendoza Sánchez	1963–1965
Dr. Jerónimo Angulo Gastón	1965–1967
Cnel. Raúl Fernández	1967–1968
Don Juan Antonio Sosa Gautier	1969–1970
Dr. Nicolás Leoz	1971–1972
Don Humberto Domínguez Dibb	1973–1976
Don Oscar Barchini	1977–1979
Dr. Nicolás Leoz	1979–1984
Don Jesús Manuel Pallarés	1985–1994
Esc. Oscar J. Harrison	1994–1998

==== Asociación Paraguaya de Fútbol ====
Name	Period
Esc. Oscar J. Harrison	1998–2007
Lic. Juan Ángel Napout	2007–2014
Lic. Alejandro Domínguez	2014–2016
Lic. Ramón González Daher	2016
Lic. Robert Harrison	2016–Present

=== Association staff (2022) ===
Name	Position
(Paraguay) Robert Harrison	President
(Paraguay) Carlos Sosa	Vice President
(Paraguay) Javier Díaz de Vivar	2nd Vice President
(Paraguay) Luis Kanonnikoff	General Secretary
(Paraguay) Hugo Kuroki	Treasurer
(Paraguay) Douglas Martínez	Technical Director
(Argentina) Gustavo Alfaro	Team Coach (Men's)
(Brazil) Carlos Bona	Team Coach (Women's)
(Paraguay) Fernando Ortiz	Media/Communications Manager
(Paraguay) Jose Luis Alder	Futsal Coordinator
(Paraguay) Cynthia Franco (Paraguay) Eber Aquino	Referee Coordinator

== Paraguayan football league system ==
The football in Paraguay has four levels in men's tournaments (five in the interior of the country) and one division in women's tournaments. The Paraguayan Football Association with an affiliated association called the Interior Football Union (UFI) –which consists of 17 federations, one for each department of the country, excluding the city of Asunción-, organizes the different championships.

The most popular football teams in Paraguay are Olimpia, Cerro Porteño, Guaraní, Libertad and Nacional. All of them are from Asunción.

The Supercopa Paraguay is a national cup played since 2021. It is single match, on a neutral field that faces the champion of Primera División and the champion of Copa Paraguay, a competition created in 2018 with teams of all categories, including the federations that belong to UFI.

There is also a category for the reserve of the football teams called Categoría Reserva and then the formative divisions from 14 to 19 years. The women's division also has a U-18 category.

Since 2024 there are four women's tournaments: the one division league –called Campeonato Anual FEM–, Copa EFE, Copa Paraguay FEM and Supercopa FEM.

Regarding futsal, it is organized in four categories: a premium league, the Honor Category, Primera and Intermedia. There is also a category for women.

The APF also organizes two beach soccer championships, the Tournament of Stars and the Women's Beach Soccer Tournament.

== Controversy ==
The freedom of players to be contractually released and transfer between clubs and negotiate contracts (commonly called a "buyout clause") has been controversial, and subject to both scholarly inquiry and legal proceedings.

== Current sponsorships ==
- Shell
- Puma
- Coca-Cola
- Rexona
- Volkswagen DIESA
- Pechugon
- Tokyo Electrodomésticos
- Pilsen
- Royal Viajes
- Bambi
- Assist Card
- NSA
- Koala
- Aposta.la
- Rexona
- Hellmann's
- Omo
- Mostaza
- Marley Coffee
- Chortitzer
- Hydrate
- AVA
- Yerba Mate Kurupi
- Glacial
- Damattween
- 23sports
- Aesa

== Previous sponsorships ==
- AET
- Claro
- Nevado
- Panini
- Eme
- Super Spuma
- LATAM Airlines Paraguay
- Inesfly
- Asepasa Seguros
- Farmacenter
- Urba Inmobiliaria
- Schneider
- Lacteos Trebol
- CTI Móvil
- Fiat
- Pulp
- Grupo Luminotecnia
- Prestige
- Tigo Telecel
- Leopard
- Amanecer Pinturas
- McDonald's
- SportCesped

== See also ==
- Copa Paraguay
- Paraguayan Primera División
- Paraguay national football team
- Football in Paraguay
- Paraguayan Footballer of the Year
- Paraguay women's national football team
- Paraguayan Tercera División
- Sport in Paraguay
- Estadio Defensores del Chaco
- 2019 FIFA Beach Soccer World Cup
- Juan Ángel Napout
- Juan Escobar (Paraguayan footballer)
- Paraguay women's national under-20 football team
- Robert Harrison
