= FIFA Women's World Cup hosts =

List of hosts

Logo of FIFA

Number of times each nation has hosted the FIFA World Cup Hosted 3 times Hosted 2 times Hosted 1 time Planned Cancelled

== History ==
The decision to hold the first tournament in China was made by FIFA, football's international governing body, after China hosted a prototype world championship three years earlier, the 1988 FIFA Women's Invitation Tournament. The first Women's World Cup was sponsored by Mars, Incorporated. With FIFA still reluctant to bestow their "World Cup" brand, the tournament was officially known as the 1st FIFA World Championship for Women's Football for the M&M's Cup.

Only China and the United States have hosted the event on more than one occasion. The 2003 edition was originally awarded to China, but was moved to the United States in May 2003 due to the SARS outbreak. China were instead awarded the right to host the following edition in 2007.

== List of hosts ==
Year	Host	Continent
1991	China	Asia
1995	Sweden	Europe
1999	United States	North America
2003	United States	North America
2007	China	Asia
2011	Germany	Europe
2015	Canada	North America
2019	France	Europe
2023	Australia and New Zealand	Oceania
2027	Brazil	South America
2031	Costa Rica, Jamaica, Mexico, and United States	North America
2035	England, Northern Ireland, Scotland, and Wales	Europe

== 1991 FIFA Women's World Cup ==
Bid:

- China

FIFA selected China to host the inaugural FIFA Women's World Cup as Guangdong had hosted a prototype world championship three years earlier, the 1988 FIFA Women's Invitation Tournament.

Result:

1. China

== 1995 FIFA Women's World Cup ==
Bid:

- Bulgaria

Bulgaria was selected to host the 1995 FIFA Women's World Cup.

Result:

1. Bulgaria

However, Bulgaria had to relinquish their hosting rights by FIFA due to practical reasons.

FIFA approached Euro 1992 hosts Sweden at short notice to organise the event.

- Sweden

FIFA later decided to move the tournament to Sweden. As a result, Sweden became the first nation to hold both the men's and women's World Cups, having hosted the 1958 FIFA World Cup

Result:

1. Sweden

== 1999 FIFA Women's World Cup ==
Bids:

- United States

The United States Soccer Federation announced their intention to bid for the 1999 FIFA Women's World Cup in February 1995, shortly after hosting the successful 1994 FIFA World Cup. Australia and Chile both announced their intention to bid but withdrew from the process in December 1995. This left the United States as the sole applicant by the March 1996 deadline for bids. The FIFA Executive Committee officially awarded hosting rights to the United States on May 31, 1996, the same day that the 2002 FIFA World Cup was jointly awarded to Japan and South Korea.

Result:

1. United States

== 2003 FIFA Women's World Cup ==
Bids:

- Australia
- China

The Australia Soccer Federation began bidding for the tournament in 1998 and was solely unopposed by the time of the bidding deadline. However, FIFA President at the time, Sepp Blatter, expressed his intentions of bringing the tournament back to China, which hosted the inaugural tournament in 1991. Little interest was shown by the Chinese Football Association however FIFA awarded the hosting rights to China.

Result:

1. China
2. Australia

Several sporting events in China were canceled or postponed in early April due to the outbreak of SARS in southern China, and FIFA launched a joint investigation with the World Health Organization into whether the outbreak would subside by the time of the tournament. On May 3, 2003, FIFA announced that they would move the tournament to an alternate host country, which would be determined at a later date.

Bids:

- Sweden
- United States

The United States and Australia had expressed interest in hosting, while Brazil was floated as another potential host. On May 26, 2003, the United States was announced as the tournament's new host, ahead of the other formal bid submitted by Sweden. The United States was judged to be a suitable emergency host because of their experience with organizing the 1999 tournament.

China was subsequently awarded the hosting rights to the 2007 FIFA Women's World Cup by FIFA, as well as $1 million to the organizing committee to compensate for planning expenses.

Result:

1. United States
2. Sweden

== 2007 FIFA Women's World Cup ==
Bids:

- China

Originally, China was to host the 2003 edition, but the outbreak of SARS in that country forced that event to be moved to the United States. FIFA immediately granted the 2007 event to China, which meant that no new host nation was chosen competitively until the following tournament in 2011.

Result:

1. China

== 2011 FIFA Women's World Cup ==
Bids:

- Australia
- Canada
- France
- Germany
- Peru
- Switzerland

Six nations, Australia, Canada, France, Germany, Peru and Switzerland, initially declared their interest in hosting the 2011 Women's World Cup. The German Football Association announced its hopes to host the tournament on 26 January 2006, following a pledge from German Chancellor Angela Merkel to fully support a potential bid. All six nations officially announced their interest by a 1 March 2007 deadline and acknowledged their intention of bidding by 3 May 2007 to FIFA.

Switzerland withdrew on 29 May 2007, stating that Europe is heavily focused on France and Germany, and a third European bid appeared futile. On 27 August 2007, France also withdrew, reportedly in exchange for Germany's support for their bid to host the men's UEFA Euro 2016. Later Australia and Peru voluntarily dropped out of the race as well, leaving only Canada and Germany as the remaining candidates. On 30 October 2007, the FIFA Executive Committee voted to assign the tournament to Germany. Canada was eventually awarded the 2015 Women's World Cup four years later.

Upon the selection, Germany became the third country to host both men's and women's World Cup, having hosted the men's twice in 1974 and 2006.

Result:

1. Germany
2. Canada
3. ~~Australia~~ withdrew
4. ~~France~~ withdrew
5. ~~Peru~~ withdrew
6. ~~Switzerland~~ withdrew

== 2015 FIFA Women's World Cup ==
Bids:

- Canada
- Zimbabwe

Two bids were submitted from the Canadian Soccer Association and Zimbabwe Football Association in December 2010. Zimbabwe withdrew its bid on 1 March 2011. The country was seen as a long shot as its women's team was ranked 103rd in the world at the time of the bid and has never qualified for a Women's World Cup. There was also ongoing political and economic instability in the country. Canada were subsequently awarded the hosting rights for the 2015 FIFA Women's World Cup as the sole bidder.

2015 Results
Nation	Vote
Nation	Round 1
Canada	N/A
~~Zimbabwe~~	Withdrew
Total votes	N/A

== 2019 FIFA Women's World Cup ==
Bids:

- France
- South Korea

Initially, five countries indicated interest in hosting the events: France, England, South Korea, New Zealand and South Africa. Both England and New Zealand registered expressions of interest by the April 2014 deadline, but in June 2014 it was announced that each would no longer proceed. South Africa registered an expression of interest by the April 2014 deadline; but later decided to withdraw prior to the final October deadline. Both Japan and Sweden had also expressed interest in bidding for the 2019 tournament, but Japan chose to focus on the 2019 Rugby World Cup and the 2020 Summer Olympics, whilst Sweden decided to focus on European U-17 competitions instead. France and South Korea made official bids for hosting the tournament by submitting their documents by 31 October 2014.

On 19 March 2015, France officially won the bid to host the Women's World Cup along with the U-20 Women's World Cup. The decision came after a vote by the FIFA Executive Committee. Upon the selection, France became the third European nation to host the Women's World Cup (following Sweden and Germany), and the fourth country to host both the men's and women's World Cup, having hosted the men's tournament in 1938 and 1998.

2019 results
Nation	Vote
Nation	Round 1
France	17
South Korea	5
Total votes	21

== 2023 FIFA Women's World Cup ==
Bids:

- Australia & New Zealand
- Brazil
- Colombia
- Japan

Nine countries initially indicated interest in hosting the events: Argentina, Australia, Bolivia, Brazil, Colombia, Japan, South Korea (with interest in a joint bid with North Korea), New Zealand and South Africa. Belgium expressed interest in hosting the tournament following the new deadline but later dropped out, as did Bolivia, in September 2019. Australia and New Zealand later announced they would merge their bids in a joint submission. Brazil, Colombia, and Japan joined them in submitting their bid books to FIFA by 13 December. However, both Brazil and Japan later withdrew their bids in June 2020 before the final voting.

On 25 June 2020, Australia and New Zealand won the bid to host the Women's World Cup. The decision came after a vote by the FIFA Council, with the winning bid earning 22 votes, while Colombia earned 13. Neither country had previously hosted a senior FIFA tournament.

2023 Results
Nation	Vote
Nation	Round 1
Australia, and New Zealand	22
Colombia	13
~~Brazil~~	Withdrew
~~Japan~~	Withdrew
Recused	2
Total votes	35

== 2027 FIFA Women's World Cup ==
Bids:

- Brazil
- Belgium & Germany & Netherlands
- Mexico & United States

The bidding process for the 2027 FIFA Women's World Cup began on 23 March 2023, with the host selected during the FIFA Congress on 27 May 2024. This marks the first time in Women's World Cup history that the appointment of host will be decided by the FIFA Congress. Four bids were submitted by the second deadline on 19 May 2023. Three bids from Chile, Italy and a joint bid between the Nordic nations (Denmark, Finland, Iceland, Norway, and Sweden) expressed interest but later withdrew before the deadline.

The football associations of Belgium, Germany, and the Netherlands announced their intention to jointly bid for the 2027 FIFA Women's World Cup. Belgium and the Netherlands jointly hosted the UEFA European Championship in 2000, with Belgium having previously hosted in 1972. Germany hosted the FIFA Women's World Cup in 2011 and the UEFA European Women's Championship in 2001. Germany also hosted the FIFA Men's World Cup in 1974 and 2006, the men's Euro in 1988, and will do so again in 2024. Germany and the Netherlands co-hosted several matches in the multi-national UEFA Euro 2020. The Netherlands hosted the Women's Euro in 2017.

The South African Football Association previously submitted a bid for the 2023 FIFA Women's World Cup, but withdrew its bid in December 2019. SAFA CEO Hay Mokoena stated that South Africa would consider bidding for 2027 after the women's league and national team become more competitive. South Africa has hosted the 2009 FIFA Confederations Cup and the 2010 FIFA World Cup and could use the infrastructure that was built for the tournament. In September 2022, South Africa announced its bid to host the 2027 women's edition. They later withdrew in November 2023 and decided to focus on bidding for 2031 tournament instead.

The Brazilian Football Confederation expressed interest in participating in the election for the 2027 World Cup. The country was one of the finalists for the 2023 edition, but had to withdraw due to the lack of support from the federal government, in addition to COVID-19 recession. On 2 March 2023, CBF President Ednaldo Rodrigues sent a letter to FIFA, confirming the country's intention to compete in the 2027 World Cup. On 7 March the Brazilian Minister of Sports, Ana Moser, confirmed the country's bid to host the tournament.

Former U.S. Soccer president Carlos Cordeiro expressed an interest in the U.S. hosting the tournament, stating "I believe we can and should host the FIFA Women's World Cup in 2027." The United States has previously hosted the 1994 FIFA World Cup and this tournament twice in a row in 1999 and 2003. It was reported on 6 August 2021 that U.S. Soccer was considering a bid for the 2031 Women's World Cup as an alternative before reinstating its plan for 2027 on 17 June 2022. On 21 June 2022, the president of the Mexican Football Federation, Yon de Luisa, announced interests in hosting the 2027 edition and would seek to make a bid for it. A joint bid between the United States and Mexico was announced on 19 April 2023 prior to a friendly match between the men's teams. On 29 April 2024, the U.S. and Mexico announced that they would withdraw their bid for the 2027 edition, instead focusing on bidding to host in 2031. For the first time in the tournament's history, voting took place during the FIFA Congress. The voting took place on May 17, 2024, during the 74th FIFA Congress in Bangkok, and it was opened to 207 out of the 211 members. Brazil won the vote with 119 votes in their favor compared to the 78 votes for Belgium–Germany–Netherlands.

2027 Results
Nation	Vote
Nation	Round 1
Brazil	119
Belgium, Germany and Netherlands	78
~~Mexico and United States~~	Withdrew
Total votes	207

== 2031 and 2035 FIFA Women's World Cups ==
2031 Bids:

- Costa Rica & Jamaica & Mexico & United States

2035 Bids:

- England & Scotland & Wales & Northern Ireland

The host nations for the 2031 and 2035 Women's World Cup are scheduled to be decided by the 10th extraordinary FIFA Congress in 2026, two years after the host selection for the 2027 edition. On 5 March 2025 the FIFA Council approved the bid regulations which restricted bids to CONCACAF and CAF members for 2031 and UEFA and CAF members for 2035. This effectively rendered proposed bids from China, Japan, and Saudi Arabia ineligible. The bidding process began on 5 March 2025.

On April 29, 2024, the United States Soccer Federation and Mexican Football Federation jointly announced that they would withdraw their bid for the 2027 FIFA Women's World Cup and instead bid for the 2031 edition. The United States previously hosted the 1999 edition and 2003 edition, while Mexico has never hosted a Women's World Cup. Both countries are co-hosts of the 2026 FIFA World Cup alongside Canada; media outlets speculated that the close proximity of the two events along with the 2028 Summer Olympics in Los Angeles may have been a factor in the changed bid plan. Other FIFA and confederation events the two countries have hosted are the 1970 World Cup, 1983 World Youth Championship, 1986 World Cup, 1999 Confederations Cup, and 2011 U-17 World Cup for Mexico and the 1994 World Cup, Copa América Centenario, 2024 Copa América, and 2025 FIFA Club World Cup for the United States. In addition, both countries have hosted the CONCACAF Gold Cup. On January 15, 2025, USSF president Cindy Parlow Cone confirmed the two nations would bid as soon as FIFA announces the bidding process. On March 5, 2025, the USSF announced that it had started the bidding process and later stated that month that they intended to expand the bid to other members in Central America and the Caribbean. On April 3, 2025, FIFA declared the United States and Mexico bid to be the sole valid bid for 2031. Mexico later confirmed their involvement in the bid on May 27, 2025. Costa Rica and Jamaica later joined on October 20, 2025.

In May 2023, The Football Association announced their intention to bid following the success of their women's team at the UEFA Women's Euro 2022 and the large attendance at Wembley Stadium for the 2022 Women's FA Cup final. This would be England's first time hosting the women's tournament, though they have significant hosting experience including the 1963 UEFA U-18, 1966 FIFA World Cup, 1983 UEFA U-18, 1993 UEFA U-18, UEFA Euro 1996, 2001 UEFA U-16, 2018 UEFA U-17, and several matches of UEFA Euro 2020. A bid alongside Scotland, Wales, Ireland and Northern Ireland similar to their successful UEFA Euro 2028 bid was also proposed. England, Northern Ireland, Scotland, and Wales pushed their bid from 2031 to 2035 following the confirmation of hosting restrictions on 5 March 2025. On 3 April 2025, FIFA declared the England, Northern Ireland, Scotland and Wales bid to be the sole valid bid for 2035.

On 24 November 2023, the South Africa Football Association announced the withdrawal of its bid for the 2027 edition in favor of a 2031 bid. South Africa has previously hosted the 1996 AFCON, 2000 WAFCON, 2004 WAFCON, 2009 FIFA Confederations Cup, 2010 WAFCON, 2010 FIFA World Cup, 2011 U-20 AFCON, 2013 AFCON, and the 2014 CHAN. The bid was rendered ineligible on 3 April 2025.

In May 2023, former mayor of Barcelona Ada Colau proposed a bid for Barcelona to host the 2031 FIFA Women's World Cup. Following the victory in the 2023 FIFA Women's World Cup, Second Deputy Prime Minister and Minister of Labor Yolanda Díaz proposed a World Cup bid to Prime Minister Pedro Sánchez. Spain's previous FIFA Tournament hosting experience includes the 1982 FIFA World Cup, the 1964 Euro, the 1957, the 1972, 1994 UEFA U-18 Cups, the 1996 UEFA U-21 Cup, the 1988 UEFA U-16 Cup and the upcoming 2030 FIFA World Cup. Spain pushed their bid back to 2035 following the hosting restrictions and announced on March 28, 2025, that they intended to bid alongside Portugal and Morocco (the latter of which already had their own separate bid), similar to their 2030 FIFA World Cup bid. Besides the 2030 FIFA World Cup, Morocco also hosted the 1988 African Cup of Nations, the 2013, the 2014 and the 2022 editions of FIFA Club World Cup, 2018 African Nations Championship, the 2022 Women's Africa Cup of Nations, the 2023 U-23 Africa Cup of Nations, many tournaments under the UNAF banner, the 2024 Women's Africa Cup of Nations, the 2025 Africa Cup of Nations, and they will host the next five FIFA U-17 Women's World Cups from 2025 to 2029. Besides the 2030 FIFA World Cup, Portugal has hosted the 1961 U-19, the 1991 FIFA U-20 World Cup, the 2003 UEFA U-17, the UEFA Euro 2004, the 2006 UEFA U-21, and the 2019 UEFA Nations League Finals. The bid was rendered ineligible on 3 April 2025.

== 2039 FIFA Women's World Cup ==
Bids:

- Japan
- Morocco, Portugal, Spain

On 5 August 2024, the newly elected president of the Japan Football Association Tsuneyasu Miyamoto expressed the country's interest of hosting the 2031 FIFA Women's World Cup. Japan previously co-hosted the 2002 FIFA World Cup, and other FIFA and AFC tournaments Japan has hosted include the 1979 FIFA World Youth Championship, 1991 AFC Women's Championship, 1992 AFC Asian Cup, 1993 FIFA U-17 World Championship, 2001 FIFA Confederations Cup, 2004 AFC U-17 Championship, 2012 FIFA U-20 Women's World Cup, the men's and women's tournament at the 2020 Summer Olympics, and eight editions of the FIFA Club World Cup. After their 2031 and 2035 bids were rendered ineligible on 5 March 2025, Japan decided to push for a 2039 bid. Following the women's team's victory in the 2026 AFC Women's Asian Cup on 21 March 2026, the JFA reaffirmed their interest in hosting the 2039 FIFA Women's World Cup.

On 4 April 2025, Spain, Portugal, and Morocco announced they would launch a bid to host the 2039 FIFA Women's World Cup after missing out on bidding for the 2035 edition. Spain's previous FIFA Tournament hosting experience includes the 1982 FIFA World Cup, the 1964 Euro, the 1957, the 1972, 1994 UEFA U-18 Cups, the 1996 UEFA U-21 Cup, the 1988 UEFA U-16 Cup and the upcoming 2030 FIFA World Cup. Spain pushed their bid back to 2035 following the hosting restrictions and announced on March 28, 2025, that they intended to bid alongside Portugal and Morocco (the latter of which already had their own separate bid), similar to their 2030 FIFA World Cup bid. Besides the 2030 FIFA World Cup, Morocco also hosted the 1988 African Cup of Nations, the 2013, the 2014 and the 2022 editions of FIFA Club World Cup, 2018 African Nations Championship, the 2022 Women's Africa Cup of Nations, the 2023 U-23 Africa Cup of Nations, many tournaments under the UNAF banner, the 2024 Women's Africa Cup of Nations, the 2025 Africa Cup of Nations, and they will host the next five FIFA U-17 Women's World Cups from 2025 to 2029. Besides the 2030 FIFA World Cup, Portugal has hosted the 1961 U-19, the 1991 FIFA U-20 World Cup, the 2003 UEFA U-17, the UEFA Euro 2004, the 2006 UEFA U-21, and the 2019 UEFA Nations League Finals.

== Total bids by country ==
Women's World Cup-winning bids are bolded. Withdrawn bids that were officially considered by FIFA are italicized. Bids for tournaments that weren't organized are ~~strikedtrough~~. Rejected bids, as well as planned but not-yet-official bids for 2039 and beyond, are not included.

Country	Bids	Years	Times hosted
United States	4	**1999**, **2003**, (Note: China was originally set to host, but the tournament was relocated to the United States due to the SARS outbreak. China was awarded the 2007 tournament as compensation.) 2027, (Note: Joint bid by Mexico and the United States.) **2031** (Note: Joint bid by Costa Rica, Jamaica, Mexico, and the United States.)	3
Australia	3	2003, 2011, **2023** (Note: Joint bid by Australia and New Zealand.)	1
China	3	**1991**, **~~2003~~**, **2007**	2
Brazil	2	2023, **2027**	1
Canada	2	2011, **2015**	1
France	2	2011, **2019**	1
Germany	2	**2011**, 2027 (Note: Joint bid by Belgium, Germany, and the Netherlands.)	1
Mexico	2	2027, **2031**	1
Sweden	2	**1995**, (Note: Bulgaria was originally set to host, but the tournament was relocated to Sweden for practical reasons.) 2003	1
Belgium	1	2027	0
Bulgaria	1	**~~1995~~**	0
Colombia	1	2023	0
Costa Rica	1	**2031**	1
England	1	**2035** (Note: Joint bid by England, Northern Ireland, Scotland, and Wales)	1
Jamaica	1	**2031**	1
Japan	1	2023	0
New Zealand	1	**2023**	1
Netherlands	1	2027	0
Northern Ireland	1	**2035**	1
Peru	1	2011	0
Scotland	1	**2035**	1
South Korea	1	2019	0
Switzerland	1	2011	0
Wales	1	**2035**	1
Zimbabwe	1	2015	0

== Host country performances ==
Year	Team	Result	Pld	W	D	L	GF	GA	GD
1991	China	Quarter-finals	4	2	1	1	10	4	+6
1995	Sweden	Quarter-finals	4	2	1	1	6	4	+2
1999	United States	Champions	6	5	1	0	18	3	+15
2003	United States	Third place	6	5	0	1	15	5	+10
2007	China	Quarter-finals	4	2	0	2	5	7	-2
2011	Germany	Quarter-finals	4	3	0	1	7	4	+3
2015	Canada	Quarter-finals	5	2	2	1	4	3	+1
2019	France	Quarter-finals	5	4	0	1	10	4	+6
2023	Australia	Fourth place	7	4	0	3	10	8	+2
2023	New Zealand	Group stage	3	1	1	1	1	1	0
2027	Brazil	TBD	0	0	0	0	0	0	0
2031	Costa Rica	TBD	0	0	0	0	0	0	0
2031	Jamaica	TBD	0	0	0	0	0	0	0
2031	Mexico	TBD	0	0	0	0	0	0	0
2031	United States	TBD	0	0	0	0	0	0	0
2035	England	TBD	0	0	0	0	0	0	0
2035	Northern Ireland	TBD	0	0	0	0	0	0	0
2035	Scotland	TBD	0	0	0	0	0	0	0
2035	Wales	TBD	0	0	0	0	0	0	0

== See also ==
- List of FIFA World Cup hosts
- List of Olympic Games host cities
