= Morocco–Portugal–Spain 2030 FIFA World Cup bid =

Football World Cup host nation bid

2030 FIFA World Cup
Yalla Vamos 2030 يلا فاموس 2030 ⵢⴰⵍⵍⴰ ⴼⴰⵎⵓⵙ 2030
- Bid logo

Tournament details
- Host countries: Morocco; Portugal; Spain
- Dates: June–July 2030
- Teams: 48 (May be expanded to 64) (from 6 confederations)
- Venues: 20 stadiums in 17 cities

The Morocco–Portugal–Spain 2030 FIFA World Cup bid, officially known as Yalla Vamos 2030, was a successful bid to host the 2030 FIFA World Cup by Morocco, Portugal and Spain. The bid was first announced by the football federations of Portugal and Spain on 7 October 2020, with Morocco joining on 14 March 2023. On 4 October 2023, Morocco, Portugal and Spain were chosen as the host countries for the 2030 FIFA World Cup over the South American bid, with Uruguay, Argentina, and Paraguay being selected to host three inaugural matches on the occasion of the centenary of the 1930 World Cup. It was ratified by the FIFA Congress on 11 December 2024.

== Background ==
Spain previously hosted the FIFA World Cup finals in 1982, while Portugal and Morocco have never hosted the tournament. All three countries have hosted the finals of their continental tournaments at least once – Spain in 1964, Portugal in 2004 and Morocco in 1988 and 2025. Spain and Portugal had previously submitted an unsuccessful joint bid to host the FIFA World Cup in either 2018 or 2022. FIFA's rules for rotating the tournament between continents made UEFA members, including the Royal Spanish Football Federation (RFEF) and Portuguese Football Federation (FPF) ineligible to bid for the 2026 FIFA World Cup.

The regulations for the 2030 World Cup bidding process were announced in the second quarter of 2022, with applications being accepted from June that year and the host to be officially selected at the 74th FIFA Congress in 2024. With regulations remaining the same as those for the 2026 World Cup, football federations from Asia (AFC) and North America (CONCACAF) were ineligible to host following the successful Qatar 2022 and United 2026 bids respectively. The tournament will mark the centenary of the first FIFA World Cup which was hosted by Uruguay; several other national football federations across Europe, South America and Africa had expressed interest in bidding to host the tournament.

== Announcement ==
The FPF and RFEF jointly announced their intentions to bid for the tournament during a goalless friendly match between the two countries' national teams on 7 October 2020. Before another goalless friendly between the two teams on 4 June 2021 (which also marked the centenary of Portugal's first international fixture, against Spain) the agreement to jointly support a bid was formalised. The respective presidents of the RFEF and FPF, Luis Rubiales and Fernando Gomes, ratified the agreement on behalf of their respective federations. Also in attendance to support the bid were King of Spain Felipe VI, President of Portugal Marcelo Rebelo de Sousa, Prime Minister of Spain Pedro Sánchez, Prime Minister of Portugal António Costa, as well as multiple government ministers and officials from both countries.

=== Addition of Morocco as co-host ===
On 5 October 2022, the FPF and RFEF held a joint press conference on their 2030 World Cup bid at the UEFA headquarters in Nyon, Switzerland. RFEF president Rubiales and FPF president Gomes were joined by Ukrainian Association of Football (UAF) president Andriy Pavelko, announcing that Ukraine would join the bid, despite the Russian invasion of the country. On 29 November, The Guardian reported that the Ukrainian part of the bid was "likely dead" after Pavelko was arrested on suspiscion of embezzelment.

Independently of the Spain–Portugal bid, the Royal Moroccan Football Federation announced in mid-2018 that it would seek to host the tournament. It was Morocco's sixth bid to host the FIFA World Cup, after unsuccessful attempts in 1994, 1998, 2006, 2010 and 2026. On 14 March 2023, King Mohammed VI of Morocco announced that the country would instead join the Spain–Portugal bid as a co-host. Although the Royal Spanish Football Federation did not immediately confirm the addition, the prime ministers of Spain and Portugal both welcomed Morocco's decision to join the bid. On 1 April 2023, the Kyiv Post reported that Spain and Portugal ultimately decided against going with Ukraine for the bid, "presumably" to avoid bringing attention to "Ukrainian corruption".

On 27 September 2023, Morocco was selected as the host of the 2025 Africa Cup of Nations. On 4 October 2023, the FIFA Council unanimously approved Spain, Portugal and Morocco as the sole bids for the tournament.

== Major sports events hosting experiences ==
Spain, Portugal and Morocco have all hosted various major sporting events, including:

- Spain:
  - Mediterranean Games (multiple editions)
  - Intercontinental Cup (multiple editions)
  - UEFA Euro (1964 and 2020 editions)
  - 1982 FIFA World Cup
  - 1992 Summer Olympics
  - 1992 Summer Paralympics
  - UEFA Futsal Championship (1996 and 1999 editions)
  - 1996 FIFA Futsal World Championship
  - 1999 Summer Universiade
  - 2001 European Youth Summer Olympic Festival
  - 2007 European Youth Olympic Winter Festival
- Portugal:
  - Intercontinental Cup (1961 and 1962 editions)
  - 1961 UEFA European Championship (U-18)
  - 1991 FIFA World Youth Championship (U-20)
  - 2003 UEFA European Championship (U-17)
  - UEFA Euro 2004
  - 2006 UEFA European Championship (U-21)
  - 2007 UEFA Futsal Championship
  - 2009 Lusofonia Games
  - 2015 FIFA Beach Soccer World Cup
  - 2019 UEFA Nations League Finals
- Morocco:
  - Pan Arab Games (1961 and 1985 editions)
  - 1983 Mediterranean Games
  - Futsal Africa Cup of Nations (2020, 2024 and 2026 editions)
  - Africa Cup of Nations (1988 and 2025 editions)
  - 1997 African Youth Championship (U-20)
  - U-17 Africa Cup of Nations (2013, 2025 and 2026 editions)
  - U-23 Africa Cup of Nations (2011 and 2023 editions)
  - FIFA Club World Cup (multiple editions)
  - 2018 African Nations Championship
  - 2019 African Games
  - 2025 Women's Futsal Africa Cup of Nations
  - Women's Africa Cup of Nations (2022 and 2024 editions)
  - FIFA U-17 Women's World Cup (2025, 2026, 2027, 2028 and 2029 editions)

== Key people ==
=== Presidents ===
- Fouzi Lekjaa, president of the Royal Moroccan Football Federation
- Fernando Gomes, president of the Portuguese Football Federation
- Fernando Sanz, president of the Royal Spanish Football Federation

=== Ambassadors ===
- Cristiano Ronaldo
- Andrés Iniesta
- Noureddine Naybet

== Proposed venues ==
Location of the cities proposed in the bid.
- Spain
- 1 Madrid
- 2 Barcelona
- 3 Seville
- 4 Zaragoza
- 5 Málaga
- 6 Bilbao
- 7 A Coruña
- 8 Las Palmas
- 9 S. Sebastián
- Portugal
- 10 Lisbon
- 11 Porto
- Morocco
- 12 Rabat
- 13 Casablanca
- 14 Marrakesh
- 15 Tangier
- 16 Fez
- 17 Agadir

On 14 July 2022, the Royal Spanish Football Federation unveiled a shortlist including 15 stadiums in Spain. It was decided 11 Spanish stadiums will be selected with three Portuguese ones for the Spain–Portugal 2030 FIFA World Cup bid but when Morocco joined the bid there is a possibility that Spain will select 6 or 7 stadiums.

On 22 June 2023, the president of the Royal Moroccan Football Federation Fouzi Lekjaa revealed the list of cities and stadiums that Morocco will present as part of the candidacy file to host the 2030 World Cup in a joint file with Spain and Portugal, as it was decided that 6 stadiums will be selected over 6 cities, of which 5 were previously built and will undergo a number of renovations.

On 19 July 2024, the Royal Spanish Football Federation unveiled the 11 selected Spanish venues, discarding Valencia, Vigo, Murcia and Gijón.

† denotes stadium used for previous men's World Cup tournament (Spain only)
⋆ planned stadiums to be built
+ stadiums that will undergo renovation

List of cities and stadiums proposed for the tournament
Country	City	Stadium	Capacity	Image
Spain	Madrid (Note: The cities of Barcelona, Lisbon and Madrid are each expected to choose one out of two shortlisted venues in their cities.)	Estadio Santiago Bernabéu †	78,297	
Spain	Madrid	Estadio Metropolitano	70,650	
Spain	Barcelona	Camp Nou † +	103,447 (after renovation)	
Spain	Barcelona	RCDE Stadium	53,633	
Spain	Seville	Estadio La Cartuja +	71,000 (after renovation)	
Spain	Zaragoza	Estadio Nueva Romareda *	43,144 (new)	
Spain	Málaga	Estadio La Rosaleda † +	45,000 (after renovation)	
Spain	Bilbao	Estadio San Mamés	53,633	
Spain	A Coruña	Estadio Riazor † +	48,015 (after renovation)	
Spain	Las Palmas	Estadio de Gran Canaria +	44,500 (after renovation)	
Spain	San Sebastián	Estadio Anoeta	42,300	
Portugal	Lisbon	Estádio da Luz	65,209	
Portugal	Lisbon	Estádio José Alvalade	50,103	
Portugal	Porto	Estádio do Dragão	51,075	
Morocco	Rabat	Prince Moulay Abdellah Stadium *	68,700 (new)	
Morocco	Casablanca	Hassan II Stadium *	115,000 (new)	
Morocco	Marrakesh	Marrakesh Stadium +	45,860 (after renovation)	
Morocco	Tangier	Tangier Grand Stadium +	75,600 (after renovation)	
Morocco	Fez	Fez Stadium +	55,800 (after renovation)	
Morocco	Agadir	Adrar Stadium +	46,000 (after renovation)	

== Marketing ==
The bid slogan, "Yalla Vamos 2030", and visual identity was unveiled on 19 March 2024 at a press conference in Lisbon. This dynamic phrase featured prominently in the official logo of the 2030 World Cup bid, along with a vibrant depiction of the number 30 surrounding the football with the sun and the sea. Symbolizing the year of the tournament, the number was artfully incorporated with colors inspired by the flags of the three host countries. The bid is under the slogan: "Yalla Vamos 2030" meaning "Let's Go" in Arabic (Yalla), Portuguese and Spanish (Vamos), captures the essence of unity and excitement for the upcoming event.
