= Marcel Vela =

Romanian politician (born 1963)

Vice President of the Senate of Romania
- Incumbent
- Assumed office 26 June 2023
- President: Nicolae Ciucă
- Preceded by: Alina Gorghiu

Senator of Romania
- Incumbent
- Assumed office 21 December 2016
- Constituency: Caraș-Severin

Minister of Internal Affairs
- In office 4 November 2019 – 23 December 2020
- Prime Minister: Ludovic Orban
- Preceded by: Nicolae Moga
- Succeeded by: Lucian Bode

Personal details
- Born: 2 June 1963 (age 62) Armeniș, Romania
- Party: PNL
- Domestic partner: Gabriela Nicoleta Pleșa

Ion-Marcel Vela (born 2 June 1963) is a Romanian politician who has served as Vice President of the Senate of Romania since 2023. A member of the National Liberal Party, he has been the Senator for Caraș-Severin since 2016. He previously served as Minister of Internal Affairs from 2019 to 2020, where he played a prominent role in the response to the COVID-19 pandemic in Romania.

== Education and career ==
Vela was born on 2 June 1963 in Armeniș in Caraș-Severin. He graduated from the Traian Doda High School and had higher education studies in polytechnics and legal sciences.

Vela was a founding member of the Caraș-Severin branch of the PNL in January 1990 and was a founding member of the Caraș-Severin Civil Alliance branch in 1990. He was chair of the Caransebeș PNL organisation from 1994 to 2004 and was vice-chair of the Caraș-Severin branch of the PNL from 1998 to 2008. In 2002, he became a member of the PNL National Representatives' Delegation and became Executive Secretary of the PNL in 2009. In 2010, he was elected member of the National Political Bureau and became executive deputy chairman in 2013.

Vela was Vice-Mayor of Caransebeș from 1992 to 1996 and municipal councillor from 1996 to 2000. From 2004 to 2016, Vela served as Mayor of Caransebeș.

== Senate and ministerial career (2016-present) ==
On 21 December 2016, Vela was elected as the senator for Caraș-Severin and was reelected in 2020.

=== Internal Affairs Minister (2019-2020) ===
On 9 March 2020, Vela announced the suspension of flights to and from Italy until 23 March. That same month, Vela sent a note to the President, Klaus Iohannis, to decree a state of emergency within the country. He stated that there would be a freeze on electricity, heat, gas, water and fuel prices during the state of emergency. On 21 March, Vela announced that there would be a curfew in order to slow the spread of the virus, as the country had recorded 367 infections up until that date. He also announced that Suceava, and eight surrounding villages would be placed under quarantine. The state of emergency in the country ended on 14 May, having been extended from the original end date.

Vela was not appointed to the Cîțu cabinet and was replaced by Lucian Bode, who thanked him for his handling of the ministry during the pandemic.

=== Vice President of the Senate (2023-) ===
Vela was elected as Vice President of the Senate following the appointment of Alina Gorghiu as Minister for Justice on 26 June 2023.

== Personal life ==
Vela has a daughter from his first marriage, Andra Vela, whose godfather is Daniel Chiţoiu. Vela's partner is Gabriela Nicoleta Pleșa.

== Honours ==
- In 2000, he was awarded the National Order of Faithful Service in the rank of Officer by President Emil Constantinescu.
- In 2004, he was bestowed the "Victory of the Romanian Revolution of December 1989" Order by President Ion Iliescu.
- In 2010, he was awarded the Order of Stephanus Magnus by Patriarch Daniel of Romania.
- In 2015, he was bestowed the "Fighter with a decisive role in the December 1989 Revolution" title by President Klaus Iohannis.
