= Uruguay–Argentina–Chile–Paraguay 2030 FIFA World Cup bid =

Football World Cup host nation bid

2030 FIFA World Cup
Bid by Uruguay–Argentina–Chile–Paraguay 2030 Candidatura de Uruguay–Argentina–Chile–Paraguay 2030
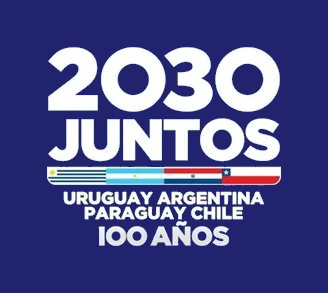

Tournament details
- Host countries: Uruguay; Argentina; Paraguay; Chile
- Teams: 48 (from 6 confederations)
- Venues: 16 (from 53 options)

The Uruguay–Argentina–Chile–Paraguay 2030 FIFA World Cup bid, also known as the South American Bid or simply the South Bid, was an unsuccessful joint bid to host the 2030 FIFA World Cup by Uruguay, Argentina, Paraguay and Chile. The tournament's name would be Centenary World Cup.

The intended bid had initially been shared between only Uruguay and Argentina. The intended bid followed an earlier web movement claiming that FIFA should give Uruguay hosting rights for the 100th anniversary of the first World Cup, which was held in and won by Uruguay. Argentina played in the deciding match of the 1930 FIFA World Cup.

The Uruguay–Argentina intention to bid was officially confirmed on 29 July 2017 before Paraguay was confirmed as the third host on 4 October 2017. Chile confirmed their bid to host with the group on 14 February 2019 as a joint communique from the confirmed nations. Bolivia also made a request to join, and Peru was rumoured to be interested in hosting. The joint bid was officially launched on 7 February 2023.

On 4 October 2023, the Morocco–Portugal–Spain bid was selected over the South American bid, with Uruguay, Argentina, and Paraguay being selected to host three inaugural matches on the occasion of the centenary of the 1930 World Cup.

== History ==
=== Background ===
On 4 October 2005, during his visit to Uruguay to commemorate the 75th anniversary of the inaugural FIFA World Cup, FIFA President Sepp Blatter had a meeting with the Uruguayan President Tabaré Vázquez. In that meeting Vázquez formally suggested that Uruguay could co-host the 2030 FIFA World Cup with another Mercosur nation to commemorate the centenary of Uruguay 1930.

After the meeting, Blatter stated, "During our meeting, the President told me of his dream of seeing this tournament hosted in the region. I told him that today's dream could be tomorrow's vision, which in turn could become a proper initiative and finally a project. At present, the South American Football Confederation is scheduled to host the 2014 FIFA World Cup, and all (national) associations will be able to present their candidature when we begin the selection process at the end of 2006. Dr Nicholas Leoz tells me that with the system of rotation it will be the turn of South America in 2030. That is the situation as it currently stands.".

=== Announcement of the intention to bid ===
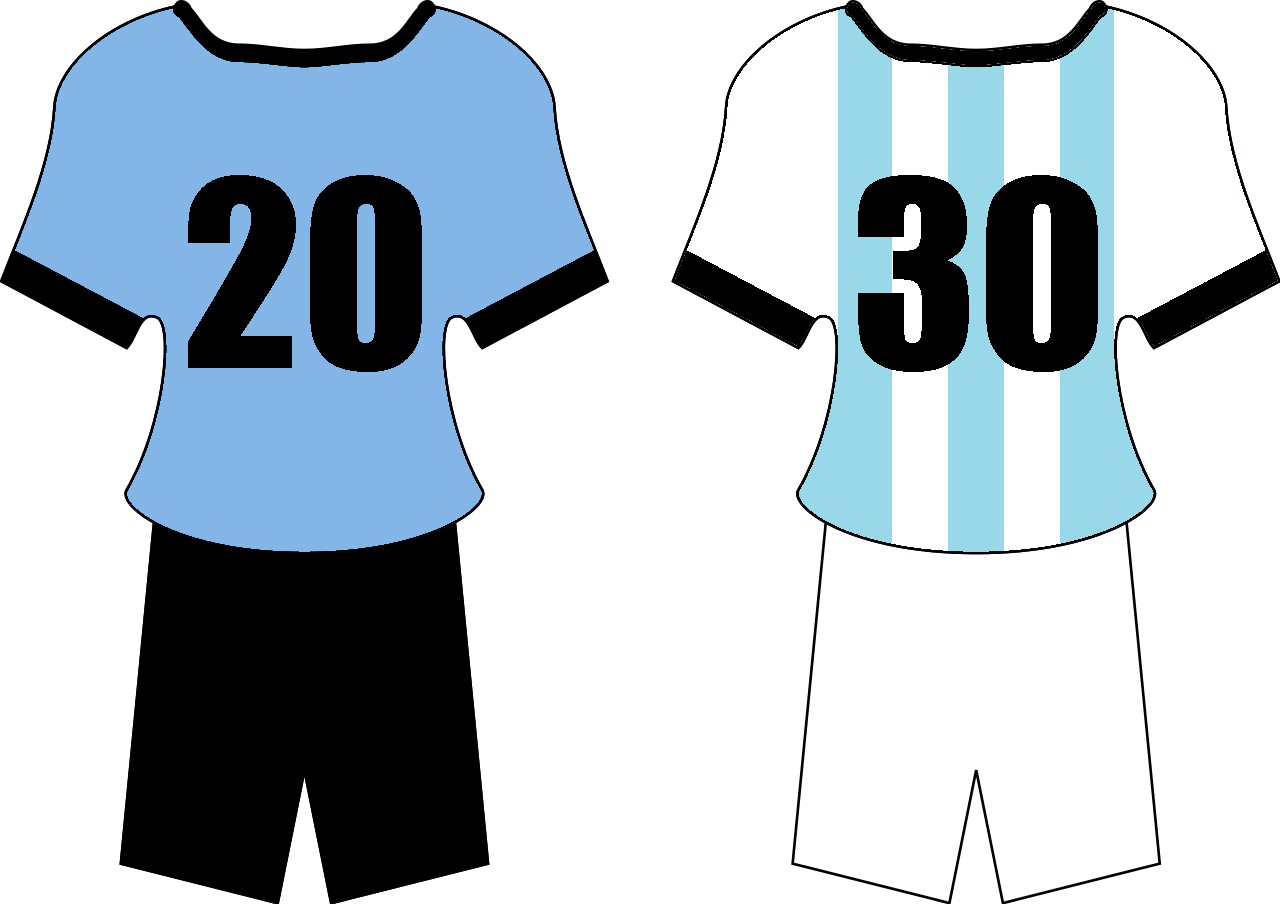
A graphical representation of the shirts worn by Luis Suárez and Lionel Messi to promote the bid

A joint bid intention was announced by the Argentine Football Association and the Uruguayan Football Association on 29 July 2017. Before Uruguay and Argentina played out a goalless draw in Montevideo, Uruguay player Luis Suárez and Argentine captain Lionel Messi – who happened to be teammates at FC Barcelona – promoted the bid with commemorative shirts.

On 31 August 2017, it was suggested Paraguay would join as a third host. CONMEBOL, the South American confederation, confirmed the joint three-way bid in September 2017. The inclusion of Paraguay as a host had previously been opposed by key Uruguayan Football Association official Wilmar Valdéz and President Tabaré Vázquez.

On 14 February 2019, Chilean president Sebastián Piñera announced on his Twitter account that Chile will join the CONMEBOL bid and plans to co-host the 2030 FIFA World Cup.

Finally, on 7 February 2023, the 4 federations officially launched the joint bid to host the 2030 FIFA World Cup.

=== Promotion of the candidacy ===
While the Iniciativa 2030 commission continues to work on the project, in June 2018 the Uruguayan Post Office launched some stamps about this bid, promoting the candidacy for the 2030 World Cup.

Also, during the 2018 World Cup, a provisional Conmebol headquarters was installed in Russia to promote the joint candidacy. They did different activities to publicize the candidacy, and in that way they presented a photographic and film exhibition of the 1930 World Cup, played in Uruguay.

During the celebration of the Copa América 2019, held in Brazil, the spot and the official posters of the candidacy were released, with a presentation made by Conmebol, which exhibited them at all times.

During the 76th FIFA Congress in March 2023, CONMEBOL President Alejandro Dominguez promoted the bid, claiming that “[w]e have to have the Centenary World Cup here, to honour history.”

=== Pause due to the pandemic ===
In March 2020, due to the arrival in the region of the coronavirus disease pandemic, talks between the countries were stopped.

To encourage the candidacy, in 2021 CONMEBOL determined that Uruguay will be the venue for the men's and women's Copa Libertadores finals, designating the Centenario and Gran Parque Central stadiums, respectively, as the venues for the two events. The idea of the confederation was for Uruguay to acquire international notoriety by hosting the tournaments, which, for example, Argentina and Chile have achieved with the holding of Copa Américas or Paraguay by also hosting a continental event. CONMEBOL also invested two million dollars in various reforms in the Centenario stadium, to take advantage of the occasion and promote the re-launch of the South American candidacy.

The Uruguayan Secretary of National Sports, Sebastián Bauzá, said in October 2021 that, despite the break, the spirit of winning the venue remains "unaltered". In charge of the Chilean commission, the journalist Michael Boys, declared: "There is not so much trouble. First comes the official application in 2022. After a few months, FIFA will deliver the technical requirements. And then comes the whole political and diplomatic part: get the votes so that the seat is elected". FIFA extended the deadline for official applications until the end of 2022.

== Major sporting events hosting experiences ==
Argentina, Chile, Paraguay and Uruguay have all hosted various major sporting events. The following is an incomplete list:

- Argentina
  - Copa America (multiple editions)
  - Pan American Games (1951 and 1995 editions)
  - Intercontinental Cup (multiple editions)
  - 1978 FIFA World Cup
  - South American Games (1982, 2006 and 2026 editions)
  - 1990 Winter Pan American Games
  - South American Women's Football Championship (1998 and 2006 editions)
  - FIFA U-20 World Cup (2001 and 2023 editions)
  - 2003 Parapan American Games
  - Copa América de Futsal (2011 and 2017 editions)
  - Copa América Femenina de Futsal (2023 edition)
  - 2013 Youth Parapan American Games
  - 2018 Summer Youth Olympics
  - 2022 South American Youth Games
- Uruguay
  - Copa America (multiple editions)
  - 1930 FIFA World Cup
  - Intercontinental Cup (multiple editions)
  - 2008 Copa América de Futsal
  - 2018 FIFA U-17 Women's World Cup
- Paraguay
  - Copa America (multiple editions)
  - 1979 Intercontinental Cup (co-host)
  - Copa América de Futsal (2003 and 2022 editions)
  - 2019 FIFA Beach Soccer World Cup
  - 2022 South American Games
- Chile
  - Copa America (multiple editions)
  - 1952 Panamerican Championship
  - 1962 FIFA World Cup
  - South American Games (1986 and 2014 editions)
  - 1987 FIFA World Youth Championship (U-20)
  - 2008 FIFA U-20 Women's World Cup
  - 2015 FIFA U-17 World Cup
  - 2016 Bolivarian Beach Games
  - 2017 South American Youth Games
  - 2018 Copa América Femenina
  - 2023 Pan American Games

== Bid committee ==
- Claudio Tapia – president of the Argentine Football Association
- Robert Harrison – president of the Paraguayan Football Association
- Wilmar Valdez – president of the Uruguayan Football Association
- Pablo Milad – president of the Asociacion Nacional de Futbol Profesional

On 20 March 2019, Argentina President Mauricio Macri, Chile President Sebastián Piñera, Paraguay President Mario Abdo and Uruguay President Tabare Vazquez accepted to create a bid committee with a representative from each country to coordinate with CONMEBOL. The first meeting was in Buenos Aires, Argentina on 8 April 2019.

== Venues by country ==
For the 2026 FIFA World Cup, it has been confirmed that stadiums must have a capacity of at least 40,000 for group round, second round, and quarter final matches, 60,000 for the semi-finals, and at least 80,000 for the Opening Match and Final. As of yet the rules for 2030 have not been announced.

There are no specific details of the venues that will be proposed by the Uruguay-Argentina, Uruguay-Argentina-Paraguay or Uruguay-Argentina-Paraguay-Chile bid, but according to the statements, some information can be deduced. According to information that made public after Paraguay aspire to be included in the event, it was unofficially known that Argentina would have eight venues, that Uruguay would have three stadiums and that Paraguay would add two scenarios to the proposal.

† denotes stadium used for previous men's World Cup tournaments (Argentina, Chile and Uruguay only).

=== Argentina ===
In 2012, after a meeting between executives from Uruguay and Argentina, it was confirmed that the Estadio Ciudad de La Plata and the Estadio Centenario would be two of the main venues of the project.

Also a new stadium in Santiago del Estero, the Estadio Único Madre de Ciudades was built for the candidature.

In October 2017, an official councilor from Mar del Plata proposed to start a process so that the city could be declared as an Argentine sub-venue for the event. Also San Juan was also proposed as a venue of the World Cup, planning to reform the Estadio San Juan del Bicentenario. Argentina has the only stadium in the Southern Cone with a capacity of at least 80,000.

=== Chile ===
Chile has currently only two stadiums of over 40,000 seats, both located in its capital Santiago (Nacional and Monumental). Other stadiums could require major investments as many other stadiums in other co-bid nations.

In March 2019, President Piñera announced that Chile would propose five cities for hosting the tournament: Santiago, Concepción, Antofagasta and Valparaíso, with a fifth city between Coquimbo and Temuco yet to be decided. Every stadium would need to be renewed in order to comply with the required eligibility criteria.

=== Paraguay ===
The fact of planning a joint bid between Uruguay and Argentina for the 2030 World Cup, corresponds to the fear of the Uruguayans of not being able to host a world tournament due to its scarce sports infrastructure. For this reason, the Paraguayan intention is to provide two venues and argue their inclusion in order to ensure the success of the candidacy.

In this case, about possible Paraguayan stadiums, both scenarios will correspond to the Asunción sub-sector, and it is speculated that they will be the Defensores del Chaco Stadium and the recently reopened General Pablo Rojas Stadium, popularly known as La Nueva Olla. Like the Uruguayan case with Montevideo, Paraguay must receive the authorization of FIFA for that the sub-office in Asunción can provide two stadiums for the candidature.

In turn, the second Paraguayan headquarters would be in Ciudad del Este or Encarnación. The Antonio Aranda Stadium (Ciudad del Este) is could be the second Paraguayan headquarters, following a project by the club 3 de Febrero to modernize the stadium and have a capacity of 50.000 spectators, being the biggest stadium in Paraguay.

In 2019, Paraguayan digital newspaper D10 reported that Club Cerro Porteño's Estadio General Pablo Rojas was chosen as Asunción's venue, whilst the other chosen venue was the Villa Alegre Stadium in the city of Encarnación.

=== Uruguay ===
The Estadio Centenario would be one of the Uruguayan stadiums, and a candidate to host the final match. According to the former president of the Uruguayan Football Association (AUF), Wilmar Valdez, Uruguay will have only two cities hosting matches, which will be Montevideo and Maldonado.

A likely candidate for a host stadium would be the Estadio Centenario, where the final of the first world championship was played in 1930 and which is Uruguay's largest stadium. With respect to the Maldonado sub-station, it would be the only stadium in that department, Domingo Burgueño Miguel Stadium. However, the organization plans a third stadium in Uruguay, which would be another one in the Montevideo sub-center.

Only two other stadiums in Montevideo could be taken into account: the Estadio Gran Parque Central (also host the first World Cup), or the recently inaugurated Estadio Campeón del Siglo. Also since the end of 2012, Nacional has been promoting the inclusion of Gran Parque Central as the second stadium of the Montevideo venue in 2030, which it ratified again in 2017. The argument that will be presented for Nacional's request of a second stadium in Montevideo will be the history of the stadium as one of the first two World Cup stadiums, together with the former Pocitos Stadium. According to the president of the AUF, Wilmar Valdez, the stadium of Peñarol (Estadio Campeón del Siglo) will not be taken into account due to its accessibility problems.

In April 2018 it was confirmed that Uruguay would present two venues (Montevideo and one in the interior of the country) and that the Uruguayan organization would have four stadiums: Centenario, Gran Parque Central and Campeón del Siglo in Montevideo, and also a new stadium outside of the capital. 300 million dollars will be invested to modernize the Estadio Centenario and another stadium will be built in the interior (probably in Punta del Este or Colonia) with an investment of also 300 million dollars.

== Potential venues ==
During the 76th CONMEBOL Ordinary Congress on 31 March 2023, a video was shown introducing the possible venues that the bid would have, shown below. Considering that forty-eight teams will compete, it has been noted that "at least twelve stadiums" will be required, but the number of possible stadiums could be higher.

(Argentina) Buenos Aires	Santiago de Chile	Santiago de Chile	(Chile) Concepción	(Paraguay) Luque
Antonio Vespucio Liberti	Nacional Julio Martínez	Estadio Monumental David Arellano	Ester Roa Rebolledo	Estadio Conmebol (planned)
Capacity: 83,000	Capacity: 48,000	Capacity: 43,000	Capacity: 33,000	Capacity: 60,000
(Argentina) La Plata	Uruguay–Argentina–Chile–Paraguay 2030 FIFA World Cup bid (South America) Uruguay–Argentina–Chile–Paraguay 2030 FIFA World Cup bid(South America)			(Paraguay) Asunción
Ciudad de La Plata	Uruguay–Argentina–Chile–Paraguay 2030 FIFA World Cup bid (South America) Uruguay–Argentina–Chile–Paraguay 2030 FIFA World Cup bid(South America)			General Pablo Rojas
Capacity: 53,000	Uruguay–Argentina–Chile–Paraguay 2030 FIFA World Cup bid (South America) Uruguay–Argentina–Chile–Paraguay 2030 FIFA World Cup bid(South America)			Capacity: 45,000
borde	Uruguay–Argentina–Chile–Paraguay 2030 FIFA World Cup bid (South America) Uruguay–Argentina–Chile–Paraguay 2030 FIFA World Cup bid(South America)			borde
(Argentina) Córdoba	Uruguay–Argentina–Chile–Paraguay 2030 FIFA World Cup bid (South America) Uruguay–Argentina–Chile–Paraguay 2030 FIFA World Cup bid(South America)			(Paraguay) Asunción
Mario Alberto Kempes	Uruguay–Argentina–Chile–Paraguay 2030 FIFA World Cup bid (South America) Uruguay–Argentina–Chile–Paraguay 2030 FIFA World Cup bid(South America)			Defensores del Chaco
Capacity: 57,000	Uruguay–Argentina–Chile–Paraguay 2030 FIFA World Cup bid (South America) Uruguay–Argentina–Chile–Paraguay 2030 FIFA World Cup bid(South America)			Capacity: 45,000
borde	Uruguay–Argentina–Chile–Paraguay 2030 FIFA World Cup bid (South America) Uruguay–Argentina–Chile–Paraguay 2030 FIFA World Cup bid(South America)			borde
(Argentina) Santiago del Estero	Uruguay–Argentina–Chile–Paraguay 2030 FIFA World Cup bid (South America) Uruguay–Argentina–Chile–Paraguay 2030 FIFA World Cup bid(South America)			(Paraguay) Ciudad del Este
Estadio Único Madre de Ciudades	Uruguay–Argentina–Chile–Paraguay 2030 FIFA World Cup bid (South America) Uruguay–Argentina–Chile–Paraguay 2030 FIFA World Cup bid(South America)			Antonio Aranda
Capacity: 30,000	Uruguay–Argentina–Chile–Paraguay 2030 FIFA World Cup bid (South America) Uruguay–Argentina–Chile–Paraguay 2030 FIFA World Cup bid(South America)			Capacity: 28,000
borde	Uruguay–Argentina–Chile–Paraguay 2030 FIFA World Cup bid (South America) Uruguay–Argentina–Chile–Paraguay 2030 FIFA World Cup bid(South America)			borde
(Argentina) Avellaneda	Uruguay–Argentina–Chile–Paraguay 2030 FIFA World Cup bid (South America) Uruguay–Argentina–Chile–Paraguay 2030 FIFA World Cup bid(South America)			(Paraguay) Encarnación
Estadio Libertadores de América	Uruguay–Argentina–Chile–Paraguay 2030 FIFA World Cup bid (South America) Uruguay–Argentina–Chile–Paraguay 2030 FIFA World Cup bid(South America)			Estadio Villa Alegre
Capacity: 48,000	Uruguay–Argentina–Chile–Paraguay 2030 FIFA World Cup bid (South America) Uruguay–Argentina–Chile–Paraguay 2030 FIFA World Cup bid(South America)			Capacity: 16,000; WC Capacity: 45,000
borde	Uruguay–Argentina–Chile–Paraguay 2030 FIFA World Cup bid (South America) Uruguay–Argentina–Chile–Paraguay 2030 FIFA World Cup bid(South America)			borde
(Argentina) Avellaneda	(Argentina) Mendoza	(Uruguay) Montevideo	(Uruguay) Montevideo	(Uruguay) Montevideo
Estadio Presidente Juan Domingo Perón	Malvinas Argentinas	Centenario	Gran Parque Central	Estadio Campeón del Siglo
Capacity: 51,000	Capacity: 42,000	Capacity: 60,000	Capacity: 34,000	Capacity: 40,000
borde	borde	borde	borde	borde

=== Other potential venues ===
- (Uruguay) Stadium 974 (Maldonado) - 44,089
- (Uruguay) Estadio Domingo Burgueño (Maldonado) - 22,000
- (Argentina) Estadio José Amalfitani (Buenos Aires) - 49,540
- (Argentina) Estadio Alberto J. Armando (Buenos Aires) - 49,000
- (Argentina) Estadio José María Minella (Mar del Plata) - 35,180
- (Argentina) Estadio Gigante de Arroyito (Rosario) - 41,465
- (Argentina) Estadio Marcelo Bielsa (Rosario) - 42,000
- (Argentina) Estadio Padre Ernesto Martearena (Salta) - 20,408
- (Argentina) Estadio San Juan del Bicentenario (San Juan) - 25,286
- (Argentina) New Boca Juniors Stadium (Buenos Aires) - 100,000
- New stadium (Santiago de Chile) - 60,000
- (Chile) Elías Figueroa Brander (Valparaíso) - 20,575
- (Chile) Francisco Sánchez Rumoroso (Coquimbo) - 18,750
- (Chile) La Portada (La Serena) - 18,250
- (Chile) Germán Becker (Temuco) - 18,000
- (Chile) Regional de Antofagasta (Antofagasta) - 35,000

== See also ==
- Spain–Portugal–Morocco 2030 FIFA World Cup bid
- Bulgaria–Greece–Romania–Serbia UEFA Euro 2028 and 2030 FIFA World Cup bid
