= Constantin-Bogdan Matei =

Romanian politician (born 1980)

Member of the Senate
- Incumbent
- Assumed office 21 December 2016
- Constituency: Vâlcea

Minister of Youth and Sports
- In office 20 November 2018 – 4 November 2019
- Prime Minister: Viorica Dăncilă
- Preceded by: Ioana Bran
- Succeeded by: Ionuț Stroe

Personal details
- Born: 26 October 1980 (age 45)
- Party: Social Democratic Party

Constantin-Bogdan Matei (born 26 October 1980) is a Romanian politician of the Social Democratic Party. Since 2016, he has been a member of the Senate. From 2018 to 2019, he served as minister of youth and sports.
